= West Sequoia League =

High school athletic league in California

The Northwest Sequoia League is a high school athletic league that is part of the CIF Central Section. There is a seasonal selection of All League players in the scope of sports administered by the league.

== Members ==
- Caruthers High School
- Minarets High School
- Orange Cove High School
- Fowler High School
- Parlier High School
- Orosi High School
- Riverdale High School
