= East Sequoia League =

High school athletic league in California

The East Sequoia League is a high school athletic league that is part of the CIF Central Section.

Original members of the East Sequoia League include Orosi, Exeter, Coalinga, Immanuel, Dinuba, Lindsay, Woodlake, and Corcoran high schools.

In 2006, Dinuba, Exeter, Immanuel, and Coalinga left the league and joined the new Central Sequoia League. Central Valley Christian and Parlier joined the ESL.

Central Valley Christian left the league in 2008 and was added to the Central Sequoia League

Orosi left the league in 2012 to join the East Sierra League. Granite Hills left the East Yosemite league and joined the ESL along with Sierra Pacific.

In 2018, Farmersville joined the league after the East Sierra League retired.

In 2022, Sierra Pacific High School left the league to join the Tri-County Athletic Conference. Orange Cove High School, Orosi High School, Summit Charter Collegiate Academy and Wonderful College Prep Academy joined the league.

There is a seasonal selection of All League players in the scope of sports administered by the league.

== Members ==
- Corcoran High School
- Farmersville High School (California)
- Granite Hills High School (Porterville, California)
- Lindsay High School (Lindsay, California)
- Orange Cove High School
- Orosi High School
- Parlier High School
- Riverdale High School (Riverdale, California)
- Strathmore High School
- Summit Charter Prep School
- Wonderful College Prep Academy (Delano, California)
- Woodlake High School
