= Farmersville High School =

Farmersville High School may refer to:

- Farmersville High School (California), in Farmersville, California
- Farmersville High School (Texas), in Farmersville, Texas
