= Stephen Vogt =

American baseball player and manager (born 1984)

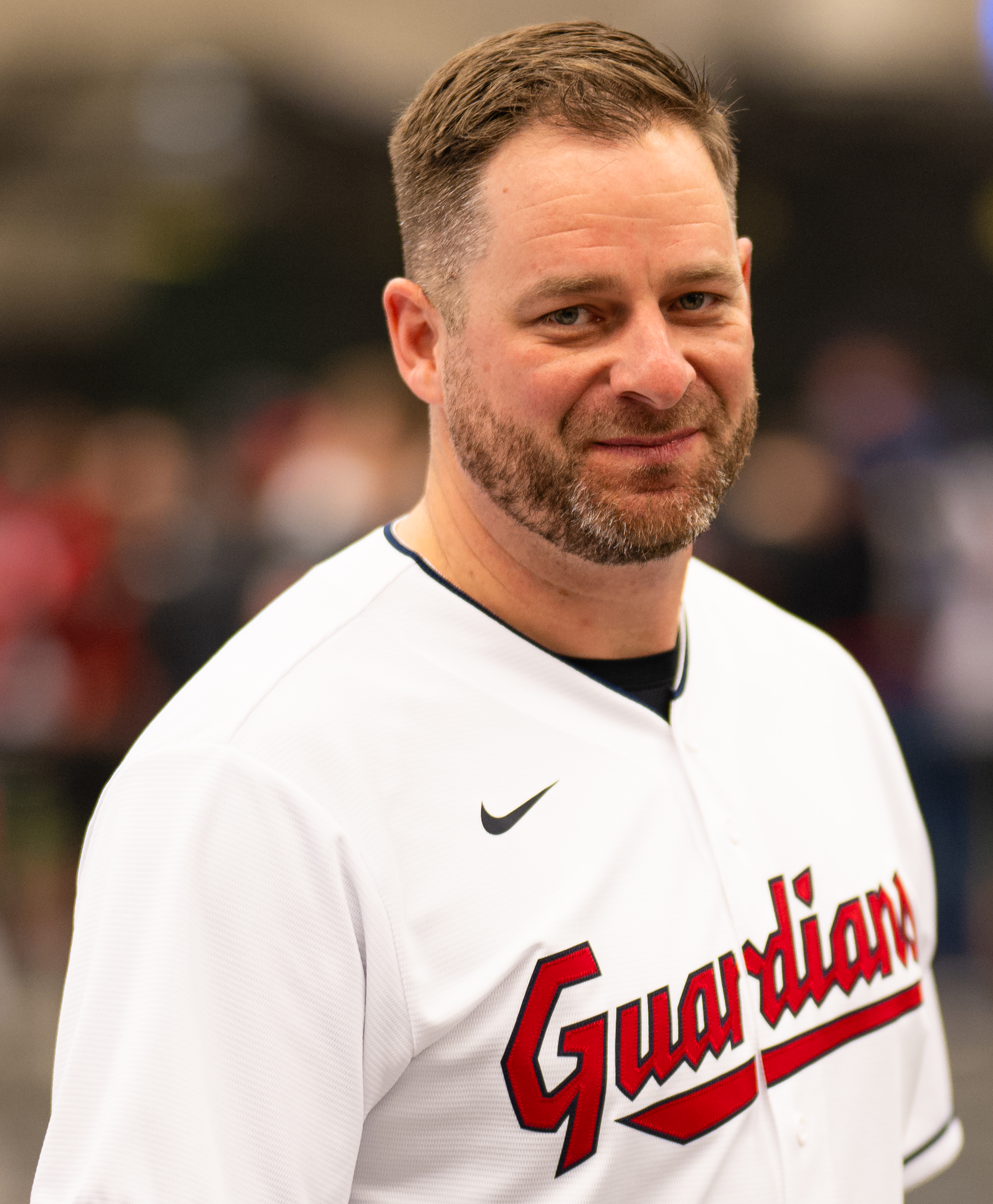
- Vogt with the Guardians in 2024

Cleveland Guardians – No. 12
- Catcher / Manager
- Born: November 1, 1984 (age 42); Visalia, California, U.S.
- Batted: Left Threw: Right

MLB debut
- April 6, 2012, for the Tampa Bay Rays

Last MLB appearance
- October 5, 2022, for the Oakland Athletics

MLB statistics (through 2026 season)
- Batting average: .239
- Home runs: 82
- Runs batted in: 313
- Managerial record: 265–220
- Winning %: .546
- Stats at Baseball Reference
- Managerial record at Baseball Reference

Teams
- As player: Tampa Bay Rays (2012); Oakland Athletics (2013–2017); Milwaukee Brewers (2017); San Francisco Giants (2019); Arizona Diamondbacks (2020–2021); Atlanta Braves (2021); Oakland Athletics (2022); As manager: Cleveland Guardians (2024–present); As coach: Seattle Mariners (2023)

Career highlights and awards
- 2× All-Star (2015, 2016); 2× AL Manager of the Year (2024, 2025)

Stephen Guy Vogt (/ˈvoʊt/ VOTE; born November 1, 1984) is an American professional baseball manager and former catcher and coach who currently serves as the manager for the Cleveland Guardians of Major League Baseball (MLB). Vogt played in MLB for the Tampa Bay Rays, Oakland Athletics, Milwaukee Brewers, San Francisco Giants, Arizona Diamondbacks, and Atlanta Braves, and served as both the bullpen and quality control coach of the Seattle Mariners in 2023. He was an MLB All-Star with the Athletics in 2015 and 2016. Vogt was selected by Tampa Bay in the 12th round of the 2007 MLB draft.

Vogt played college baseball at Azusa Pacific University, where he was a two-time All-American selection and set multiple school records. He spent six years in minor leagues in Tampa Bay and was named the franchise's Minor League Player of the Year in 2011, before debuting with the Rays in 2012 at age 27. He started his major league career with a streak of 32 consecutive at-bats without a hit, which set a Tampa Bay record and lasted into his debut with Oakland in 2013. That year, he started all three games of the 2013 American League Division Series, and hit a game-winning single in Game 2. Vogt led American League catchers in most offensive categories for the first half of his 2015 season, and his .277 batting average in 2016 was ranked in the top five among catchers heading into the All-Star break that year.

Vogt left Oakland in 2017 with a batting average of .255 with 49 home runs and 198 runs batted in over 458 games. Vogt joined the Brewers in 2017, playing one injury-shortened season with the team and finishing with a .254 batting average, his highest since 2015. After missing more than a year due to a 2018 shoulder injury, he joined the Giants, his childhood favorite team. He finished 2019 in San Francisco with some of the best offensive numbers of his career, including a .263 batting average, his highest since 2014. Vogt signed a one-year contract with the Arizona Diamondbacks in November 2019.

== Early life ==
Stephen Vogt was born on November 1, 1984, in Visalia, California. He was one of two boys born to Randy and Toni Vogt, along with his older brother Danny. Randy Vogt was an accountant, and Toni Vogt was the owner and president of the PRISM Weight Loss Program. Stephen Vogt was born into a baseball family: his father had been a pitcher at Fresno State, and two of his uncles played at University of California, Davis, including Mike Vogt, a member of the UC Davis Aggies' All-Time Century Team. Stephen began playing tee-ball at age four, and Randy coached both Stephen and Danny through Little League and Babe Ruth League. Randy said his son displayed an aptitude for athletics from an unusually early age: "I don't know if it was a developmental aspect with him, but Stephen's been playing sports since he can walk." Vogt first became a catcher at age nine, when his coach told the kids to run to whichever position they wanted to play; he originally ran for middle infield, but switched to the catcher position after seeing that none of his teammates had taken it.

Vogt's father made his sons participate in at least two sports and two non-athletic activities in school. Vogt played baseball and basketball, joined Associated Student Body, sung in choir, played trumpet and baritone horn through his sophomore year of high school, and participated in plays and musicals all throughout high school. He also performed in church musicals since his youth, and dreamed of performing on Broadway if he could not have a career in baseball. Vogt grew up a fan of the San Francisco Giants, the favorite team of his father and grandfather; Vogt's favorite players as a child were Will Clark and Barry Bonds, and he also admired Marvin Benard and his underdog story. His family would drive to San Francisco several times a year for Giants games, and they attended the final game at Candlestick Park in 1999, the franchise's first game at Pacific Bell Park in 2000, and every game of the 2002 World Series at Pac Bell Park.

Vogt attended Central Valley Christian Schools (CVC), where his father Randy was the coach of the school's baseball team, the Cavaliers. Randy had been coach of the team since 1998, when Vogt was in seventh grade and was the team's batboy. When Vogt reached high school, he played for the team himself, and during his four years there set CIF Central Section records for career walks (79) and consecutive steals (65), and second-best career marks for hits (160) and runs (147). In 2003 he was named the East Sierra League Most Valuable Player. Vogt graduated CVC in 2003, and as his senior year was concluding he received little interest from prospective college baseball teams, which he attributed in part to the small size of his school. He dreamed of playing baseball at Fresno State, where his father played, but the school did not recruit him. Vogt took part in showcases being put on by Baseball Factory, Inc., a specialist company in player development and college placement for baseball players, and during one of those showcases he was noticed by a recruiting coach from Azusa Pacific University, a small college in Azusa, California. The recruiting coach provided Azusa Pacific coach Paul Svagdis a tape of Vogt, and after watching Vogt take just three swings, Svagdis knew he wanted him on the team and contacted Vogt to recruit him.

== Collegiate career ==
Vogt played as catcher for the Azusa Pacific Cougars baseball team for four years. During his time there, his brother Danny was playing baseball for Westmont College, which meant the two occasionally played against each other. In Vogt's freshman season, Vogt had a .431 batting average with six home runs, 20 doubles, 41 runs, and 49 runs batted in (RBIs), and had a 30-game hitting streak, which fell just two games short of the school record. Vogt was selected for an National Association of Intercollegiate Athletics (NAIA) All-American Honorable Mention for the season. In his sophomore year, through April 1, 2005, he was leading the Golden State Athletic Conference with a .422 batting average, and had a team-best 11 doubles, one home run, and 20 RBIs. In May 2005, Vogt was named the Golden State Athletic Conference Player of the Year, the first Cougar to receive the honor. He batted .453 on the season with 67 hits, and finished in the top five in the conference RBIs, doubles, triples, and total bases. He also had 46 walks against 15 strikeouts and an on-base percentage of .582, with a 84-game streak of reaching base safely. Vogt ranked third on the team with a .975 fielding percentage for the season, and threw out 14 of 39 base-stealers.

In his junior year, Vogt had a .404 batting average by April 14, 2006, that ranked fourth in the Golden State Athletic Conference. In his senior year, Vogt had 14 home runs, 70 RBIs, 108 hits, 26 doubles, and a .476 batting average, which was one point short of the school record set by Jim Phillips in 1962. Vogt's senior year performance helped the Cougars achieve a No. 2 national ranking in baseball and the No. 1 seed in the NAIA World Series. Vogt hit higher than .400 each of his four seasons at Azusa Pacific. and had an average batting record of .448 across all four seasons. By the end of his collegiate baseball career, Vogt had been a two-time NAIA All-American selection, and set 10 school records, including single-season school records for hits (108) and doubles (26), as well as career school records for hits (294), doubles (74), total bases (471), RBIs (199), walks (163), and batting average (.448).

== Professional career ==
=== Draft and minor leagues ===
The Tampa Bay Devil Rays selected Vogt in the 12th round of the 2007 Major League Baseball draft, with the 365th overall selection. He spent the first few years of his minor league career in the Class A divisions of the Rays organization, starting with the Hudson Valley Renegades of the short-season New York–Penn League. He recorded his first professional hit during his 14th at-bat for the team, playing against the Brooklyn Cyclones. Vogt initially struggled in his transition to the pros, hitting .173 through 17 games as of July 13, 2007, with one home run and a team second-best nine RBIs. However, by the end of the season, Vogt had a batting average higher than .300. In 2008, Vogt played for the Columbus Catfish of the South Atlantic League, where he hit .383 in 42 games from June 27 to August 22, with 31 RBIs and a .427 on-base percentage. By the end of the season, he had a .291 batting average, with 22 doubles and four home runs.

Vogt joined the Charlotte Stone Crabs of the Florida State League (FSL) in 2009 as a catcher and designated hitter, but appeared in only 10 games before seriously injuring his shoulder. While running to home plate during a game, he slid headfirst and tore the labrum in his left shoulder, which required season-ending surgery in May 2009. Vogt never played in the catcher position during the season, and was unable to throw or hit for eight months after the injury, which many feared could be a career-ender. Vogt requested to stay on with the team for the rest of the season, providing encouragement and support without playing as Charlotte advanced to the FSL championship series in September. As Vogt worked to rehabilitate his shoulder at his home near Seattle during his offseason, Vogt repeatedly questioned whether he should continue pursuing a baseball career, particularly when his recovery suffered a setback in January 2010. He considered retiring as a player and asking the Tampa Bay scouting director for a job in coaching, but on multiple occasions, his wife Alyssa encouraged him not to quit.

Vogt made it onto Charlotte's opening day roster in 2010, but the team staff did not believe he was fully ready to return, so he was assigned to be a third-string catcher. Despite getting limited playing time due to his spot on the depth chart, Vogt was named Player of the Month for the entire Rays organization after a May that included a .404 batting average and 10 RBIs. Vogt still recorded a 17-game hitting streak, which was a franchise high, and made the Class A Florida State League All-Star team, despite having only 80 at-bats. Vogt played in 106 games as a catcher, first baseman, and outfielder for Charlotte in 2010. He finished the season with a career-high .345 batting average, the third-highest all-time by a Rays minor league player. Vogt led the league with a .511 slugging percentage and .910 on-base plus slugging percentage (OPS), ranked second for on-base percentage (.399), and ranked sixth in doubles (31), and won the Florida State League batting title. He also won the Rays' 2010 Erik Walker Community Champion Award, which honors a minor league player who exemplifies teamwork, sportsmanship, and community involvement.

During the off-season, Vogt played winter baseball to help return to hitting form after his limited at-bats with Charlotte. He could not find a spot in one of the premier winter leagues, however, so he played in the Colombian Professional Baseball League, an unusual move for an American player. Vogt enjoyed the experience, but the league ran out of money and Vogt concluded the season a month earlier than expected. Heading into the 2011 minor league season, Baseball America ranked Vogt #30 on its list of the Rays top 30 prospects, prior to a trade that brought Chris Archer, Hak-Ju Lee, Brandon Guyer and Robinson Chirinos to the Rays; after that trade, Vogt dropped off Baseball America's ranking altogether. Vogt was invited to take part in major league spring training for the Rays, marking his first major league invite to camp, at age 26. He was cut and sent down to the minor leagues in March, starting off with the Double-A Montgomery Biscuits of the Southern League, marking Vogt's first time playing above the Class A level. By May 19, Vogt was on an eight-game hitting streak and was batting .325, with seven homers and 33 RBIs, the third-best in the league. He also ranked second in the league in total bases, and third in slugging percentage. Vogt received midseason and postseason Southern League All-Star honors for his play in Montgomery.

On July 28, 2011, Vogt was called up to the Durham Bulls, a Triple-A team in the International League, after having recorded 85 RBIs in 97 games for Montgomery, the second-highest of any Southern League player. Vogt played in his first Triple-A game on July 29, batting 2 for 4 against the Gwinnett Braves, during which he was the only Durham player with more than one hit. On August 19, Vogt made his 15th RBI with Durham, which combined with his 85 from Montgomery to bring him to a 100-RBI season for the first time in his career. Vogt batted .301 at Montgomery in 2011, and .290 at Durham. In total between the two teams, Vogt finished the season with a .298 batting average, 35 doubles, 152 hits, seven triples, and 17 home runs, which was just one short of his total of 18 homers across Vogt's previous four seasons combined. He also had 105 RBIs, which led the Rays organization for the season, was the 11th highest total in the minor leagues, and ranked fourth all-time in Rays farm history. Vogt lacked a consistent position in 2011: in 128 total games, he was a catcher in 50, playing other games as a first baseman or outfielder. Vogt was named Tampa Bay's Minor League Player of the Year for 2011. Following the season, Vogt again played winter baseball, this time at the Venezuelan Professional Baseball League. During one game while playing left field, a large firecracker was thrown behind him and he was forced to flee. The resulting explosion blew a hole in the ground and singeing his neck, resulting in a suspended game as the police were called.

=== Tampa Bay Rays (2012) ===
During spring training for the Rays, Vogt was batting .323 through April 3, and was awarded the Al Lopez Award, given to the team's top rookie in spring training. Due to his lack of experience at the catcher position, Vogt was initially planned to be sent back to the minor leagues, but was a last-minute addition to Tampa Bay's opening day roster, in part due to injuries to Rays players B. J. Upton and Sam Fuld. Vogt was 27 when he was first called up to the major leagues. He was the third catcher on the roster behind José Molina and José Lobatón, and the team planned to use Vogt as a pinch hitter and utility player, primarily in left field but also occasionally at first base and catcher. Vogt made his major league debut on April 6, 2012, against the New York Yankees, and struck out in his first at-bat against Yankees pitcher David Robertson. Vogt failed to record a hit in his first 13 at-bats, a franchise record for a Rays player at the start of his career; the previous record was 12, held by pitcher Jeff Niemann. Vogt was sent back down to the Durham Bulls on April 20, in part because Upton had returned from his injury. Vogt was briefly recalled on May 14 due to a knee injury to Desmond Jennings, and Vogt's major league hitless streak stretched to 17 total at-bats, extending the franchise record. He was sent down to Durham again on May 29 to make room on the Rays roster for Hideki Matsui.

Vogt initially struggled in his return to Durham, hitting .214 with one home run and 8 RBIs in 19 games through May 13. But his numbers soon improved, including a season-high hitting streak of eight games May 31 to June 7. Vogt recorded a .364 batting average for the month of June, and was named Tampa Bay's top minor league player of the month. Vogt also had a 27-game on-base streak from May 31 to June 30, and then another on-base streak of 12 games from July 13 to 25. Vogt also had doubles in four straight games from August 15 to 18, and collected his 300th career minor league RBI with a single on August 24 against the Norfolk Tides. Vogt finished the 2012 Durham Bulls season with a .272 batting average, 43 RBIs, and nine home runs. Vogt played 37 Durham games in 2012 as a catcher and 35 as an outfielder, as well as games at other positions like first base. By the end of 2012, his minor league career batting average was .299, in nearly 1,900 at-bats.

Vogt was called back up to the Tampa Bay Rays on September 5 after Durham's season ended. He played in his first major league game at the catcher position on September 23 against the Toronto Blue Jays. Vogt recorded zero hits in 25 total at-bats for the Rays in 2012, making him the first American League position player, and one of four players overall, to go hitless for the season with at least 25 at-bats. Across three separate stints with the Tampa Bay Rays in 2012, Vogt played in 18 games, as an outfielder, catcher, and first baseman. Rays scouts and coaching staff believed Vogt needed some work defensively, so he lifted weights and began practicing yoga to improve in this area.

=== Oakland Athletics (2013–2017) ===
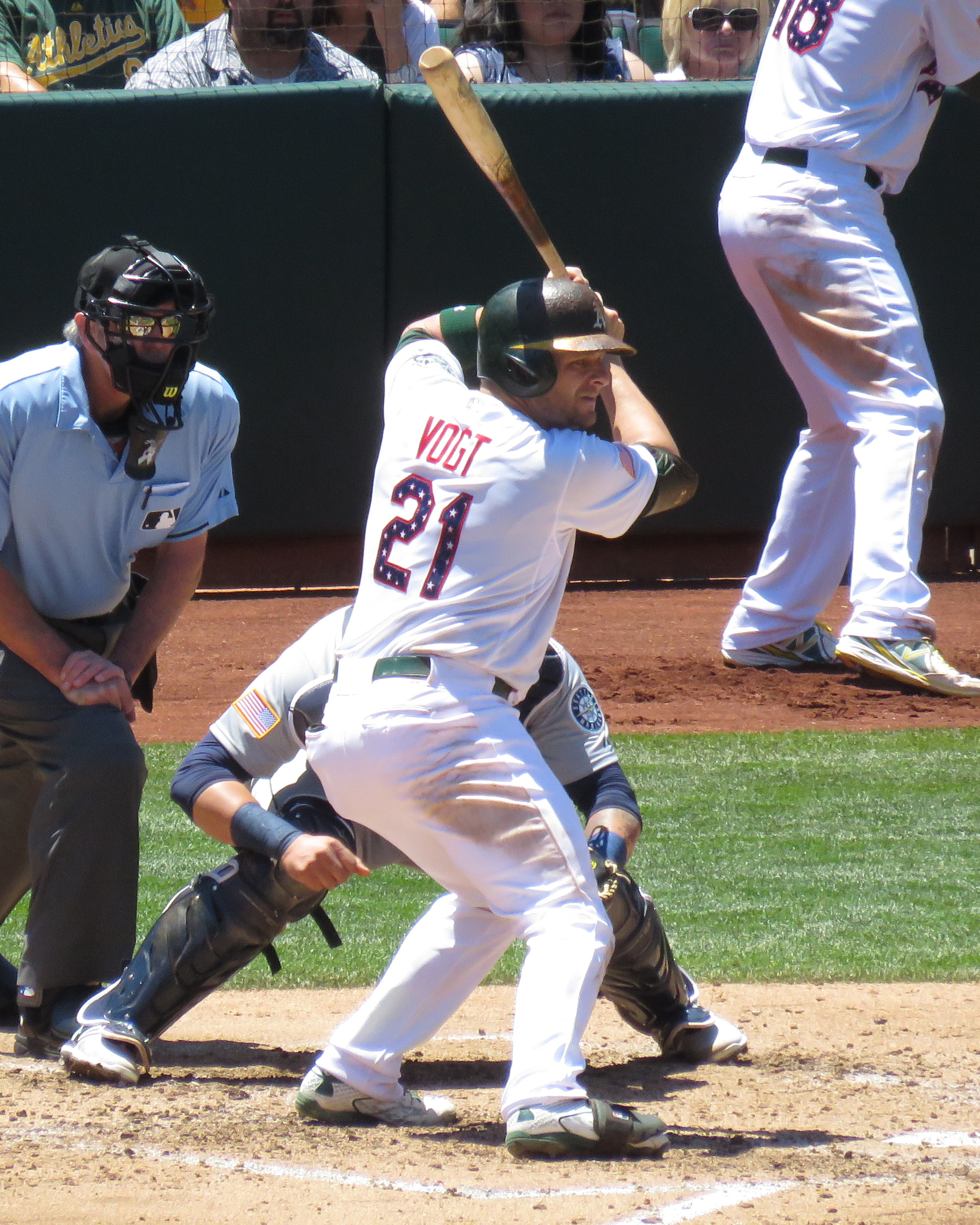
Vogt with the Athletics in 2015

==== 2013 ====
The Tampa Bay Rays designated Vogt for assignment on March 31, 2013; he and his family were driving to Durham in anticipation of Vogt playing for the Bulls when he was called with the news. On April 5, he was traded for cash to the Oakland Athletics, who bought his contract for $150,000. Oakland assigned Vogt to the Triple-A Sacramento River Cats of the Pacific Coast League, where Vogt debuted on April 7, going 3 for 4 in hits including a home run and two doubles. He embarked on a 13-game hit streak, which was a team-high, highlighted by an April 14 game against the Reno Aces in which Vogt hit 5 for 6 and recorded four runs, six RBIs, and two home runs, one of which was a grand slam. Through April 20, Vogt led the Pacific Coast League in hitting (.529), on-base percentage (.579) and slugging percentage (1.000), and he had multiple hits in 10 of his first 14 games with Sacramento. By April 28, Vogt had a league-leading batting average of .457, as well as five home runs and 18 RBIs. Unlike the previous season, Vogt was an everyday catcher for the River Cats, starting in the position six out of every seven games, and as of May 7, the team was 15–5 when Vogt played as catcher, and 2–9 when he did not.

Vogt was called up to the Oakland A's on June 25. The team was in need of backup because catcher John Jaso suffered an abrasion on his hand, and Derek Norris, also a catcher, was in a hitting slump. At the time of his recall, Vogt was hitting .324 in 58 games with the River Cats, with 13 home runs and 58 RBI, and having thrown out 19 of 47 (40.4%) base-stealers, the third-best ratio in the Pacific Coast League. Having spent six years almost entirely in the minor leagues, Vogt was a rookie at age 28 for the Athletics. In his debut game with Oakland on June 25, Vogt failed to get a hit but did record his first major league RBI, when a fly ball was caught for an out was deep enough to score Josh Donaldson from third base. Vogt started off 0 for 7 in hits for the A's, extending his hitless streak to his first 32 at-bats. though he only struck out twice over that span. It marked the longest hitless streak to start a career by a non-pitcher since Chris Carter went 0 for 33 with the A's in 2010. Vogt got his first hit in the major leagues in his third game with Oakland, on June 28, a home run off a pitch from Joe Kelly of the St. Louis Cardinals, breaking Vogt's 0 for 32 hitless streak. Vogt was returned to Sacramento after about a week at Oakland in the catcher position, during which time the Athletics won all four games, and Vogt recorded 2 hits in 13 at-bats.

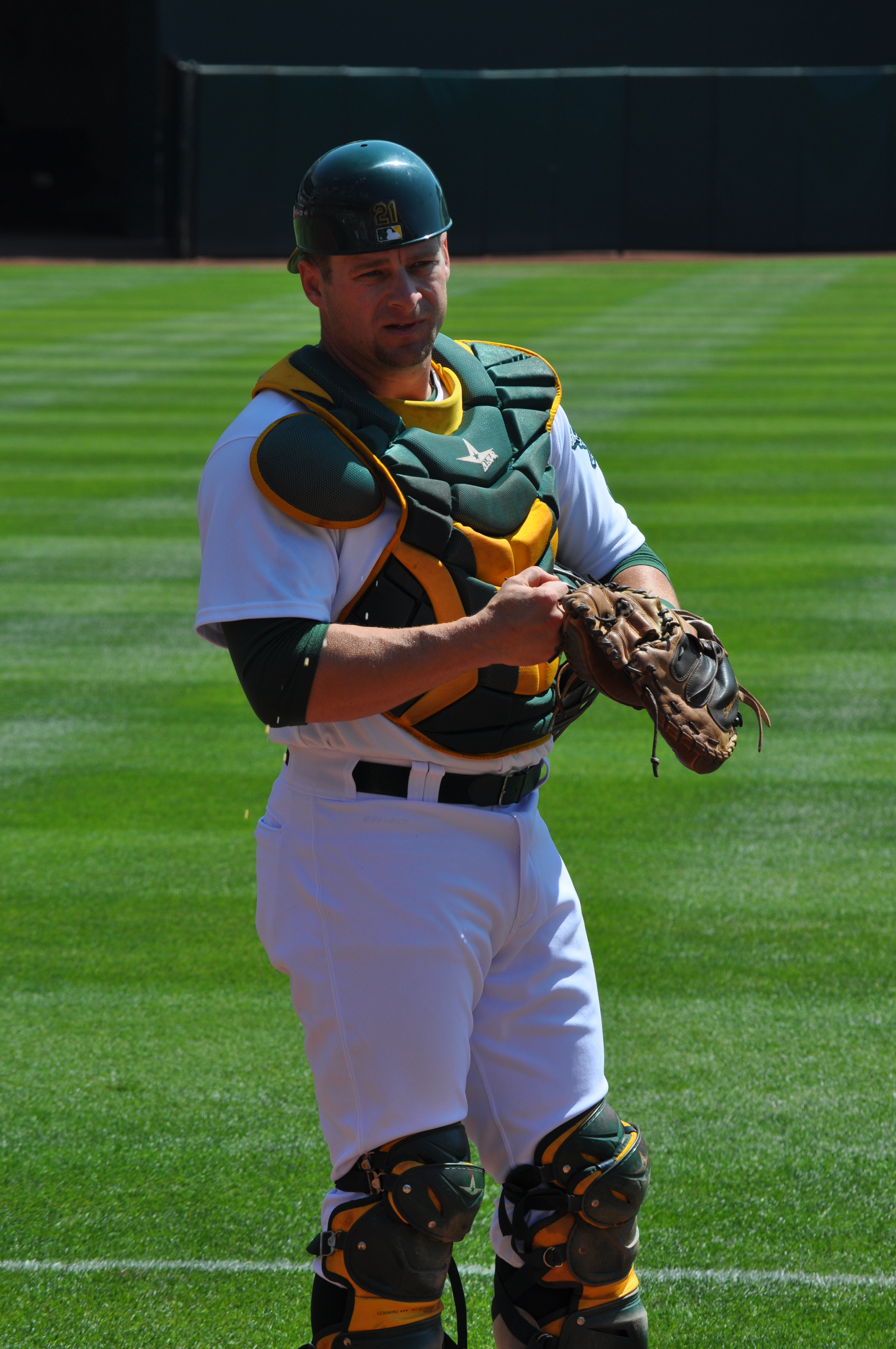
Vogt before a game for the Oakland Athletics on August 21, 2013, against the Seattle Mariners.

Through July 22, Vogt was batting .325 with 12 home runs and 57 RBI in Sacramento, having played a career-high 71 games as catcher. He was named the Pacific Coast League player of the week on July 23, which capped a week in which he had four home runs in six games. Vogt was called back up to Oakland again on July 25 after Jaso was placed on the disabled list due to a concussion. Jaso did not return for the season, leaving Vogt the sole left-handed-hitting catcher on the roster, sharing playing time with right-handed Derek Norris and Kurt Suzuki. The A's won the next four games with Vogt catching, making a total of eight consecutive wins in the first games with Vogt as catcher. Vogt hit his first career major league triple on August 31 in a 2–1 win over his former team, the Tampa Bay Rays. In the month of August, Vogt batted .328 over 56 at-bats. He finished September hitting 4 for 26 in his final 10 regular season games in September. In total, Vogt had a .252 batting average with four home runs in the 2013 regular season, as well as 16 RBIs, having appeared in 45 regular season games, and 135 at-bats. The Athletics were 27–13 in games that Vogt started.

Vogt started in all five games of the 2013 American League Division Series, catching all but two postseason innings for the A's in their series with the Detroit Tigers. Although Vogt finished the regular season with a hitting slump, Oakland manager Bob Melvin started him in the ALDS because Vogt played well against Detroit during their series in August, when he played three of the four games and batted 4 for 11, with at least one hit in each game. Vogt led the Athletics to a win in Game 2 of the ALDS with a bases-loaded walk-off single in the ninth inning, off pitcher Rick Porcello. It was Vogt's first career game-winning hit in the major leagues, and the first walk-off RBI in Major League Baseball postseason history by a rookie catcher. In Game 3 of the series, Vogt hit a triple off Aníbal Sánchez, and scored on Coco Crisp's sacrifice fly ball. Detroit ultimately won the series in five games.

==== 2014 ====
Vogt posted strong numbers during the 2014 spring training, with a .357 batting average through March 25, as well as three home runs and 12 RBIs, both of which were tied for the team lead. However, he did not make the opening day roster, as the presence of Jaso and Norris meant the team did not need another catcher. Melvin called the decision one of the hardest cuts he ever had to make. Vogt returned to the Sacramento River Cats, where he was considered a leader on the team. On April 8, Vogt suffered a strained oblique muscle and missed several weeks; he was re-activated on May 12, after missing 30 games. Vogt had a 10-game hitting streak through May 28, over which he had seven multi-hit games. Vogt was recalled to Oakland on June 1, after having hit .364 in Sacramento in 2014, with three home runs and 19 RBIs in 21 games.

Vogt hit his first home run of the season on June 11, a two-run homer against Jered Weaver of the Los Angeles Angels. On June 22, Vogt made his first career appearance at first base in the major leagues when he was moved to the position in the top of the ninth inning against the Boston Red Sox. Vogt started 13 games in right field in 2014, and fans in the stands near him during those games began a "I believe in Stephen Vogt!" chant, which was modeled after the United States men's national soccer team chant "I believe that we will win!". The chant became widespread, with the Athletics even selling T-shirts and merchandise with the catchphrase in team stores throughout O.co Coliseum. After suffering a bad bone bruise on his right foot, Vogt was unable to play in the catcher position in any games after July 7. As of that date, Vogt had appeared in 31 games for the Athletics, with a hit in 24 of them. He had a career-best 12-game hitting streak from June 30 to July 12, which included six multi-hit games.

As of July 31, Vogt was batting .351, and had played nearly every day in June and July, appearing in a variety of positions including catcher, outfield, and first base. Vogt entered into a hitting slump, recording 0 hits on 23 at-bats from July 29 to August 6, but he ended the drought with a home run on August 7, after which he had five hits in four games. After already having played with a right foot injury for about two months, Vogt sprained his left ankle during a September 3 game when he slid into second base, breaking up a double play. Vogt was out from September 3 to 17, and was limited to first base upon his return. Vogt ultimately only caught 15 games in 2014. By September 20, Vogt was leading the team in batting average with .298.

By the end of the season, Vogt played in a career-high 84 games, marking the first time Vogt had played more than 47 games in a major league season. He ended the year with a .279 batting average, 35 RBIs, nine home runs, and 75 hits Vogt was the 2014 recipient of Oakland's annual Catfish Hunter Award, presented to the team's most inspirational player in recognition of contributions on and off the field. The award is voted on by A's players. Vogt required foot surgery after the season concluded, to repair a ruptured plantar plate, which took about five months to heal.

==== 2015 ====
With Oakland trading John Jaso and Derek Norris during the offseason, Vogt became the starting catcher for the Athletics heading into 2015. The team traded for catcher Josh Phegley, and initially planned for Vogt and Phegley to be in a platoon together, but Vogt quickly earned the clear starting role, marking his first full-time opportunity at the catcher position. During the offseason, Vogt made an adjustment to his hitting approach at the direction of hitting coach Darren Bush, placing a greater emphasis on making low, hard contact; Vogt credited this with helping make him a better big-league player. Having recovered from offseason foot surgery, Vogt started on opening day with no restrictions. Vogt hit a three-run home run against the Texas Rangers during the Athletics' season opener on April 6. On April 17, Vogt hit two home runs against the Kansas City Royals, his first multi-homer game. In the first 20 games of the season through April 26, Vogt had started 15 games at catcher and was hitting .345 with a team-leading four home runs, 14 RBIs, and an on-base percentage of .426. Vogt was ranked in the top eight in the American League in batting average, RBIs, on-base percentage, and slugging percentage, and led all major league catchers in those categories as well as home runs.

Vogt hit the second multi-home run game of his career on May 3, with two home runs against the Rangers, as well as four RBIs. He hit his first career grand slam on May 4 against Minnesota Twins pitcher Phil Hughes, which also marked his third home run in three consecutive at-bats. Through May 13, Vogt was leading the American League in RBIs (30), was ranked second in OPS (1.098), and had nine home runs, which matched both his career-high and his season total from the previous year. He also had only 5 fewer RBIs than he had in 84 games in 2014. By May 16, he had the America League's ninth-highest batting average at .337, and his slugging percentage of .598 was the league's third-highest as of May 26. On May 31, Vogt reached a new career-high in RBIs, when he drove in all three runs in a 3–0 win against the New York Yankees, bringing his career total to 38. On June 15, Vogt hit his second career grand slam against San Diego Padres pitcher Cory Mazzoni.

Entering June 20, Vogt ranked among the American League leaders in several major categories, including RBIs (second) and on-base-plus-slugging percentage (seventh). Among A.L. catchers, Vogt ranked first in home runs (13), RBIs (50), walks (36) and OPS (.918). On July 7, Vogt finished third in American League All-Star voting results, behind Toronto's Russell Martin and Kansas City's Salvador Pérez. As of that date Vogt led American League catchers in most major offensive categories, including OPS (.882) and RBIs (53) and ranks second in WAR (2.6). On July 12, Vogt hit his 14th home run of the season, surpassing his major league career total in all previous seasons combined, and he finished the first half of the season with a 56 RBIs and a slash line of .287/.374/.498.

Vogt was selected for the 2015 Major League Baseball All-Star Game, marking his first All-Star appearance. He was the second former Azusa Pacific University student-athlete to earn All-Star accolades, after American football fullback Christian Okoye. Vogt and Oakland pitcher Sonny Gray were the only starting pitcher-catcher combination from one team to make the year's American-League All-Star squad. Vogt had one at-bat during the All-Star game, during which he struck out in the sixth inning. Vogt had his jersey from the game framed and gifted it to Azusa Pacific, where it was displayed in their locker room.

On July 18, Vogt hit a walk-off single against the Minnesota Twins, the second walk-off hit of his career, and his first in regular season play. Vogt recorded 0 hits on 28 at-bats between July 22 and August 3, the second-worst streak of his career, and the worst since his 0-for-32 skid when he debuted in the majors. In June and July combined, Vogt had a .216 batting average, with three home runs and 20 RBI, a drop in production compared to April and May. In July alone, he hit 13 for 80, for a batting average of .163. In August, Vogt was batting .284, with four home runs and nine RBIs, which continued a decline compared to the first half of the season, although he had a .344 on-base percentage for the month due to eight hits and a walk in his final 15 plate trips. On August 29, Vogt hit his 17th home run of the season against the Arizona Diamondbacks at Chase Field, with the ball landing in the swimming pool located in the park's right-center field, marking the 53rd homer to ever fall into the pool. He hit his final home run of the season and second consecutive three-hit game the next day, also against the Diamondbacks.

In a September 6 game against the Seattle Mariners, Vogt was injured after getting struck in the groin by a foul ball traveling 93 miles per hour, which was hit by Ketel Marte, resulting in Vogt missing 12 games before returning on September 20. For the second half of the season, Vogt has a slash line of .217/.280/.349. In total for 2015, Vogt played in 136 games, finishing with a .261 batting average, as well a career-high 18 home runs and 71 RBIs, which was more than twice the 35 RBIs he had the previous season. Vogt had the second-highest RBIs on the Oakland roster, behind outfielder Josh Reddick's 77. The Athletics finished with the season with the worst record in the American League at 68–94; Vogt said the team's struggles "got to me mentally" and that he had to improve his mental toughness. Vogt was honored with the organization's Dave Stewart Community Service Award, and for the second consecutive year received the Catfish Hunter Award. He also received the 2015 Athletics Good Guy Award from the local Bay Area chapter of the Baseball Writers' Association of America, was Oakland's nominee for the Roberto Clemente Award, and was nominated for the 2015 Hutch Award.

==== 2016 ====
Vogt earned a salary of $527,500 for 2016. He underwent arthroscopic surgery on his right elbow on January 29, to address lingering pain he had been experiencing since the winter. The surgery removed a bone chip and dead tissue from his elbow joint. He was gradually eased into action during spring training before starting the regular season on opening day. Vogt hit .273 in his first 10 games of the season through April 13. Vogt had 11 hits in 26-at bats through April 22, during which he had three hits in one game. Vogt had only 7 RBI on the season through May 21, but he had five RBI on May 22 and 23 alone, as well as a home run and a double in those two games. He also recorded at least one hit for 11 consecutive games from May 22 to June 5, with 17 total hits in that span, including three-hit games on May 31 and June 5. Vogt also reached base at least once in 12 games ranging from May 19 to 31, going 15 for 42 and batting .357 during that stretch, bringing his to get his batting average for the season up to .264. On July 9, Vogt hit the first opposite-field home run of his career, a two-run solo homer against the Houston Astros. He also finishing the day one triple shy of a hitting for the cycle, marking the third time in his career that had happened.

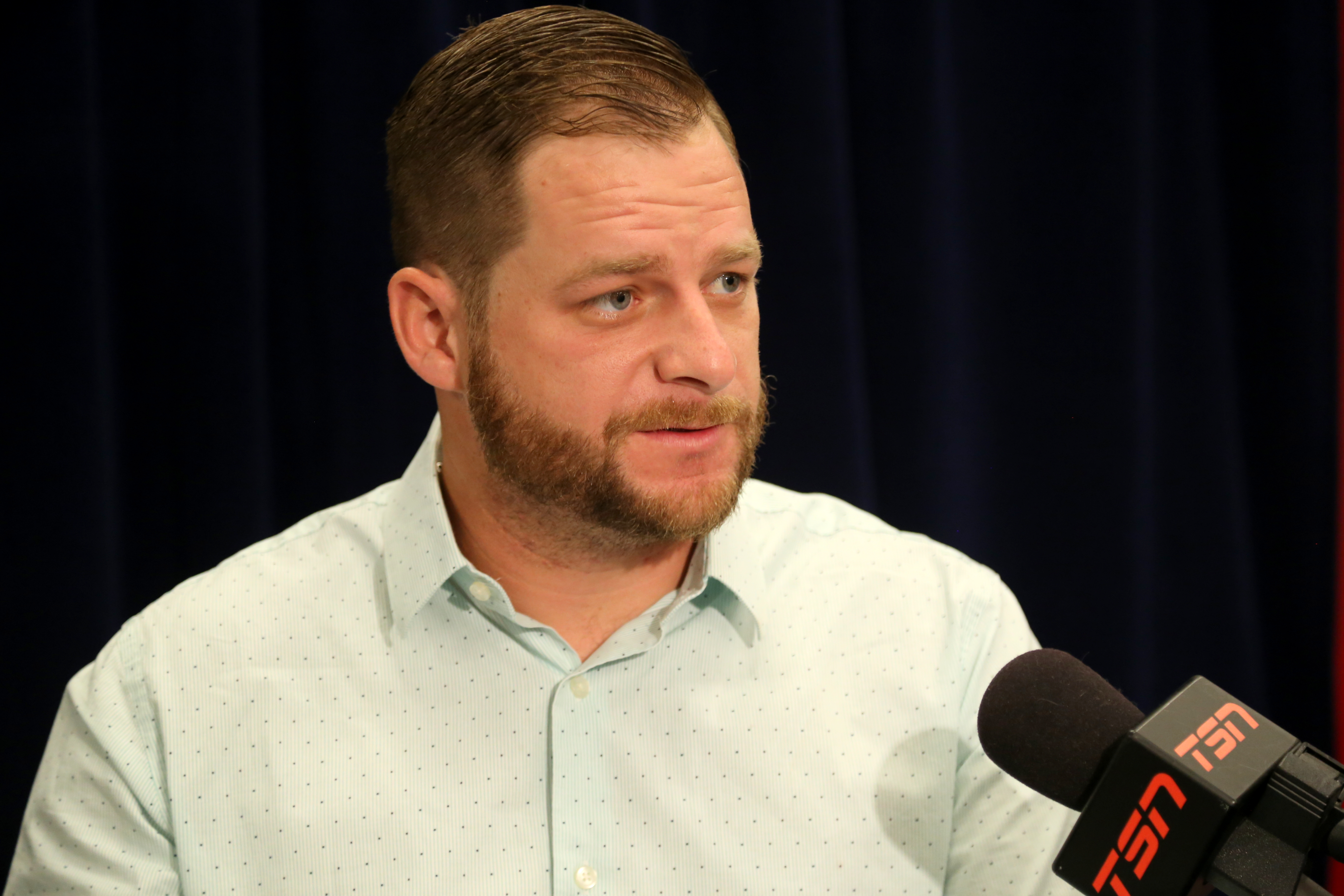
Vogt speaking to reporters on July 11, 2016, the day before the 2016 Major League Baseball All-Star Game.

Through the first half of the season, Vogt had a slash line was .277/.320/.442 in 72 games, with seven home runs, and 27 RBIs. Though his offensive numbers were lower than his first-half numbers in the 2015 season, catchers' numbers in general were down across the league, and Vogt's batting average ranked in the top five among catchers. He also led all catchers with 18 doubles. Vogt was selected for the 2016 Major League Baseball All-Star Game, marking his second consecutive appearance. He was Oakland's sole All-Star representative for 2016, and he was the first Athletics non-pitcher named to consecutive All-Star teams since Jason Giambi in 2000 and 2001. Vogt did not get to play in the All-Star game itself, as Salvador Pérez and Matt Wieters were the only American League catchers who played.

On September 15, Vogt batted in five runs against the Kansas City Royals, matching his career-high single-game RBI. He hit his 14h home run of the season during his final at-bat of 2016 in October 2 game against the Seattle Mariners. Vogt finished the season with a .251 batting average, 14 home runs, and 56 RBIs, playing in a career-high 137 games, which was one more than the previous season. He also won the Catfish Hunter Award for three consecutive year, and won the Dave Stewart Community Service Award for a second year in a row, making him the first two-time winner.

==== 2017 ====
Vogt signed a contract for $2,965,000 on January 13, 2017. With the addition of catcher Bruce Maxwell to the Oakland roster, Bob Melvin planned to reduce the number of games Vogt would play behind the plate, giving Vogt more time off and reducing the chance of injuries. Vogt hit a solo home run in the April 3 season opener against the Los Angeles Angels. On April 28, Vogt threw out Alex Bregman of the Houston Astros on a steal attempt, his first time successfully throwing out a runner in 14 consecutive opposing runs dating back to 2016. The game also marked the first two-error game of Vogt's career, with two interference calls against him.

In 54 games for Oakland in 2017, Vogt had a slash line of .217/.287/.357 batting line, in 157 at-bats. He also had four home runs, 20 RBIs, and a .644 on-base-plug-slugging percentage. His defensive performance had declined compared to previous years, throwing out only 15% of runners, which led to an increase in base-stealing while he was playing as catcher. On June 22, Oafkland designated Vogt for assignment. He was the second-longest-tenured Athletic at the time he was cut. During his five seasons with the Oakland A's, Vogt had a slash line of .255/.316/.416, with 49 home runs, and 198 RBIs, in 458 games. In his combined time with Oakland and the Tampa Bay Rays over six seasons, had a career .251/.312/.409 slash line. There was a great deal of disappointment on the Oakland roster after Vogt was cut; pitcher Sean Doolittle called him "the unquestioned captain of the team", and Josh Reddick said it was "hard to imagine a clubhouse without him".

=== Milwaukee Brewers (2017) ===
==== 2017 ====
On June 25, 2017, Vogt was claimed off waivers by the Milwaukee Brewers, where he was planned to play in a timeshare with catcher Manny Piña. Through his first 12 games for Milwaukee, he was hitting .250 with four home runs and nine RBIs, which combined with his 2017 games in Oakland brought his numbers to a .222 batting average, eight home runs, and 29 RBIs. On July 17, Vogt was injured when Pittsburgh Pirates pitcher Chad Kuhl collided with him while running for home. Vogt's left leg bent backwards during the collision, and he suffered a sprained medial collateral ligament in his knee, forcing him to miss about a month. Vogt had a rehabilitation assignment with Milwaukee's Triple-A affiliate Colorado Springs Sky Sox in August before rejoining the Brewers. He returned to the team on August 18, where he played wearing a protective brace on his knee and doubled in his only at-bat.

By September 4, Vogt was batting .317 with five home runs and 11 RBI over 23 games, including a .412 average in the last week of that span. On September 29, Vogt had a home run and three RBIs in a 5–3 victory over the St. Louis Cardinals that helped keep Milwaukee's playoff hopes alive. Vogt's game on September 30 would be his last in the major leagues for more than a year. He finished 2017 with a .254 batting average for the Brewers, his highest since his 2015 All-Star season. Vogt also had eight home runs, 20 RBIs, and a .508 slugging percentage, in 45 games for Milwaukee, over 129 at-bats. Including his time in both Oakland and Milwaukee, Vogt had a 2017 batting average of .233, with 12 home runs, 40 RBIs, and a .285 on-base percentage, his lowest since his major league debut season in 2012. Vogt threw out just three of 66 runners in stolen base attempts in total during his time in Oakland and Milwaukee in 2017, including just one of 28 during his time with the Brewers.

==== 2018 ====
The Brewers re-signed Vogt in 2018, again planning for him to split time with Piña. Vogt agreed to a one-year non-guaranteed contract of $3,065,000, which he signed to avoid salary arbitration and a possible non-tender. During the offseason, Vogt worked on improving his throwing motion, adjusting his arm slot, and further strengthening his arm to improve his defense behind the plate. However, Vogt ended up playing in only three spring training games for the Brewers for the entire year. He hurt his right shoulder during a spring training workout, and when the discomfort lingered, it was later discovered to be a strained capsule. After being sidelined for several months, Vogt began a rehabilitation assignment with Milwaukee's Double-A affiliate Biloxi Shuckers on May 2, hitting a solo home run in his first game. On May 5, when he was one day away from returning to the Brewers, Vogt reinjured the shoulder making a throw to third base, while trying to throw out Cade Gotta of the Jacksonville Jumbo Shrimp during a stolen base attempt. Vogt damaged his rotator cuff, labrum, and capsule, which required season-ending surgery. The surgery took place on May 17. and due in part to his age of 33 at the time of the surgery, doubts were raised as to whether he would ever play again. Though Vogt never played a major league game in 2018, he opted to travel with the Brewers, supporting the players and assisting the coaching staff, in what Vogt described his as a "weird hybrid of player-coach". On November 1, Vogt elected to enter free agency, and departed from the Brewers after clearing waivers.

=== San Francisco Giants (2019) ===
Vogt held a workout for interested teams on January 31, 2019, which was attended by five teams, including the San Francisco Giants. On February 10, Vogt agreed to a minor-league deal with the Giants, his favorite team during his childhood. Vogt said: "It's been a lifelong dream of mine to play for the Giants. It's going to come true this year." The Giants wanted Vogt to take pressure off catcher Buster Posey as he recovered from right hip surgery; the team also wanted Vogt to provide some competition for young Giants backup option Aramis Garcia. Vogt did not make the opening day roster, instead starting in the minor leagues to get more repetitions and help rebuild his arm strength. This marked Vogt's third tour with the Sacramento River Cats (which had been Oakland's Triple-A affiliate until 2015), and his first since 2014. In 72 at-bats for Sacramento in 2019, Vogt had a slash line of .241/.389/.500, with three doubles, four home runs, and seven RBI. as well as an .889 on-base plus slugging (OPS). Vogt was called up to San Francisco on May 1, making his return to the major leagues less than a year after his shoulder surgery. On May 3, Vogt appeared in his first major league game since the shoulder injury, in which he pinch hit against the Cincinnati Reds. He recorded three hits, two RBIs, and a game-tying home run, marking his first three-hit game since September 26, 2017, and his first major league home run since September 29, 2017.

Vogt batted .467 in his first six games with San Francisco from May 3 to 10. He hit two triples against the Brewers on June 15, his only triples of the season. He was the first Giants catcher to record two triples in one game since Steve Nicosia in 1984, and just the third catcher from any team to do so in the previous eight years; it also marked the first two-triple game from any Giants player in three years. By June 17, Vogt was hitting .264 with a .783 OPS, which was among the best offense numbers for catchers on the season. Those numbers improved even further following the All-Star break, when Vogt was hitting .357 with a 1.223 OPS in 14 games between July 13 and 27. In his first 53 games of the season through July 22, Vogt had a .262 batting average, his highest since 2014, as well as career-highs in OPS (.844) and slugging percentage (.508). On August 9, Vogt hit a two-run home run 423 feet out of Oracle Park into McCovey Cove, the 79th "splash hit" by a Giant in the history of the park; he was the first Giant to hit one since Brandon Belt on May 15, 2018. Vogt hit a three-run home run in the eighth inning in a game against the Oakland A's on August 24, his first game played at Oakland Coliseum since leaving the team.

By the end of August, Vogt was considered a front-runner for the Willie Mac Award, which is presented annually to the most inspirational player on the Giants. Late in the season, with Posey still struggling, Vogt was called to play more often than originally planned, with his backup position turning into more of a timeshare. On September 17, Vogt caught all 294 pitches thrown in a 5-hour 54-minute game that lasted 15 innings against the Boston Red Sox, during which a franchise-record 13 pitchers were used.

Vogt finished the season with some of his best offensive numbers of his career, posting a .263/.314/.490 slash line, with 10 home runs and 40 RBI, across 99 games and 255 at-bats. Vogt's batting average was his highest since 2014, and he posted new career highs in slugging percentage (.490) and OPS (.804). However, he threw out only six of 35 base-stealers (17%) for the year, and had the slowest poptime (2.14) among the year's major league catchers, meaning the amount of time between when a pitch hits a catcher's glove to when it reaches the glove of the middle infielder at second base. During the off-season, Vogt said he wanted to play for a team that could compete for the World Series, which was interpreted as a sign he would not remain with the Giants. Vogt entered into free agency in November.

=== Arizona Diamondbacks (2020–2021) ===
On November 26, 2019, Vogt signed a one-year contract with the Arizona Diamondbacks. In 2020 for Arizona, Vogt batted .167/.247/.278 with 1 home run and 7 RBI in 72 at-bats. Vogt played in 52 games for the Diamondbacks in 2021, slashing .212/.307/.386 with 5 home runs and 17 RBI.

=== Atlanta Braves (2021) ===
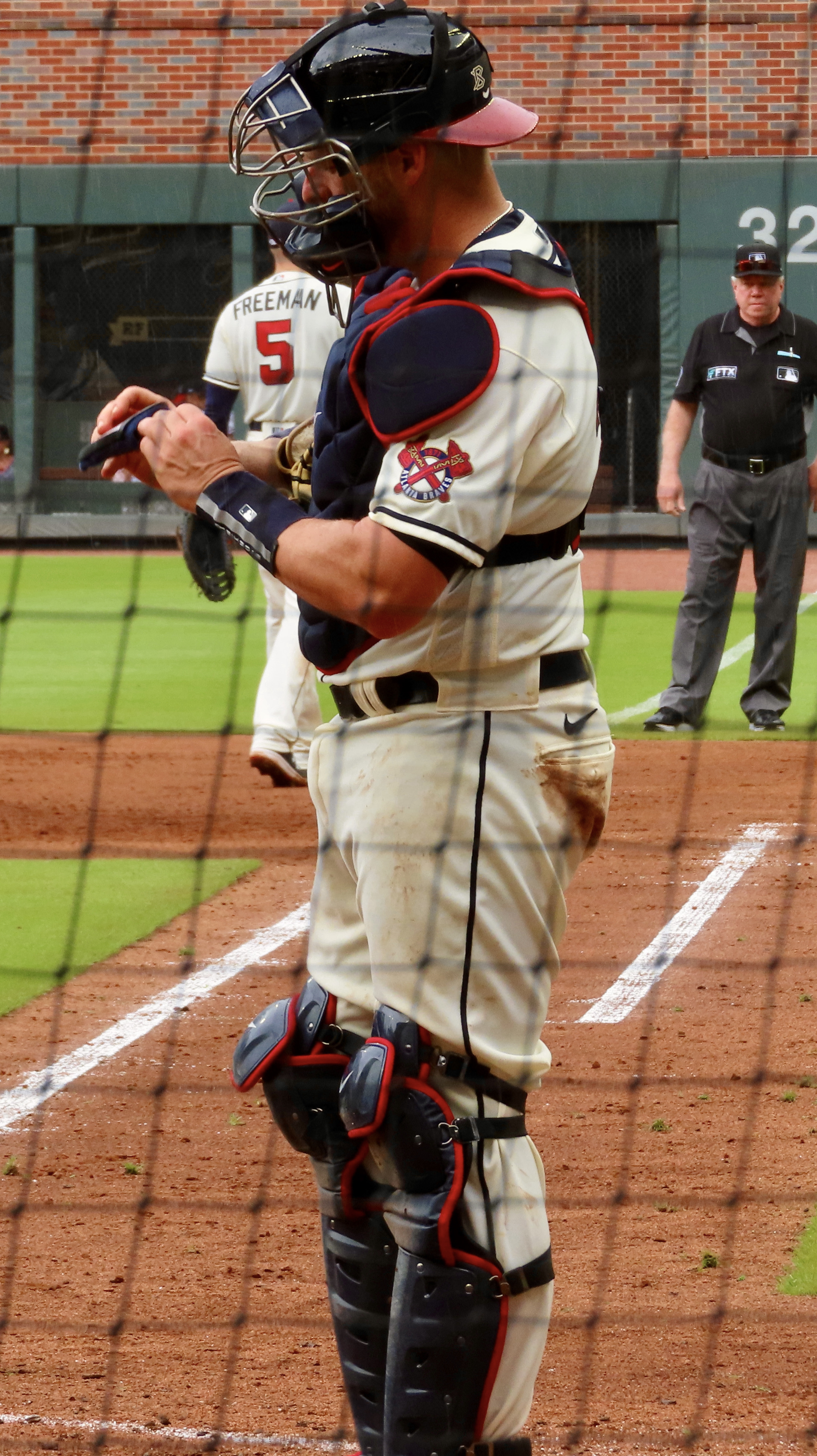
Vogt with the Atlanta Braves in 2021

On July 16, 2021, Vogt was traded to the Atlanta Braves in exchange for Mason Berne. On October 8, Vogt was designated for assignment by the Braves and outrighted to the Triple-A Gwinnett Stripers. Despite not being on the postseason roster, he received a World Series ring from the Braves.

=== Return to Oakland (2022) ===
On March 24, 2022, Vogt signed a one-year contract to return to the Oakland Athletics. He was placed on the injured list on April 21 after spraining his right knee. Vogt returned from the injured list on May 7. On September 22, 2022, Vogt announced he would retire at the end of the 2022 season. On October 5, Vogt hit a home run in his final major league at-bat in the final game of the season for the A's, a 3-2 victory over the Angels.

== Coaching and managerial career ==
=== Seattle Mariners ===
On January 10, 2023, Vogt was hired by the Seattle Mariners to serve as the team's bullpen and quality control coach.

=== Cleveland Guardians ===
On November 6, 2023, Vogt was named manager of the Cleveland Guardians, the 45th manager in club history.

On September 21, 2024, the Guardians won the American League Central Division title. This was their 12th division title in team history, and Vogt’s first as a professional manager. Vogt was named the 2024 AL Manager of the Year, beating out AL Central division rival managers Matt Quatraro (Kansas City Royals) and A. J. Hinch (Detroit Tigers), making him the third manager in Cleveland franchise history to win the award. Following the season, Vogt agreed to a multi-year contract extension with the Guardians.

On November 11, 2025, Vogt again was awarded AL Manager of the year, becoming the first AL Manager to win the award in back to back seasons since Kevin Cash of the Tampa Bay Rays in 2020 & 2021. Milwaukee Brewers manager Pat Murphy won NL manager of the year in 2024 and 2025, marking the first time both leagues had repeat winners of the award in the same season. Vogt and Murphy are also the first managers to win the award in their first two seasons managing a team.

== Managerial record ==
As of October 15, 2026

Team	Year	Regular season					Postseason			
Team	Year	Games	Won	Lost	Win %	Finish	Won	Lost	Win %	Result
CLE	2024	161	92	69	.571	1st in AL Central	4	6	.400	Lost ALCS (NYY)
CLE	2025	162	88	74	.543	1st in AL Central	1	2	.333	Lost ALWC (DET)
CLE	2026	162	85	77	.525	1st in AL Central	5	6	.454	Lost ALCS (TB)
Total		485	265	220	.546		10	14	.417	

== Personal life ==
Vogt is married to Alyssa Vogt (née Ferdaszewski). They met when both were attending Azusa Pacific University, where Alyssa was a standout on the college basketball team, playing in all five positions and scoring more than 1,000 points from 2004 to 2007. A 2003 graduate of Capital High School in Olympia, Washington, Alyssa has coached girls' basketball at Evergreen State College in Olympia, and the Tumwater High School in Tumwater, Washington. Stephen and Alyssa Vogt have three children: a daughter named Payton and two sons named Clark and Bennett. Payton was born in 2011, Clark in 2014, and Bennett in 2016. The family has previously lived in Olympia, Tumwater, and Oakland. Vogt's mother Toni died in July 2016.

Stephen and Alyssa Vogt support the School of Imagination in Dublin, California, which offers services and support systems to children, including those with special needs, disabilities, and developmental disorders like autism. The couple have made multiple visits to work with autistic and special needs children there. In November 2016, Vogt received a 2016 Threads of Hope Award from Diablo Magazine for his work with the School of Imagination; the magazine described Vogt and the other winners as "exceptional volunteers who give their time to charitable causes in the East Bay".

Vogt has been considered a favorite among fans, who saw him as an underdog and everyman. In 2014, Oakland fans coined for him the chant "I believe in Stephen Vogt!" Vogt won the Catfish Hunter Award for being the Athletics' most inspirational player for three consecutive years and the Dave Stewart Community Service Award for two straight years. He was also popular among teammates on each team with which he has played, and is well known for his sense of humor. He won the Tampa Bay Rays talent show in both 2009 and 2010, eventually becoming emcee of the shows, and in March 2019 he was voted one of the funniest teammates on the San Francisco Giants in a poll of players. He is well known for his impressions of various people, including baseball manager Joe Maddon, a basketball referee, and Matt Foley, the motivational speaker character portrayed by Chris Farley on the sketch comedy series Saturday Night Live. Farley was Vogt's favorite actor and the person who inspired him to start doing impressions, and Vogt delivered a speech to the Oakland players at the start of the 2015 season as Matt Foley. An interview Vogt delivered as Matt Foley in 2015 won him an Esurance MLB Award for Best Interview, and he also performed his basketball referee impression on the MLB Network talk show Intentional Talk, which generated a great deal of viral Internet attention, and led to the creation of a Vogt referee bobblehead with sound.

He has a superstitious habit of getting dressed in a specific sequence each day, including how he pulls on his socks and in what order.
