= Ochs =

Ochs or OCHS may refer to:

== People ==
- Ochs (surname)

== Geography ==
- Kleines Fiescherhorn, a mountain peak of the Bernese Alps near Grindelwald, Switzerland, also named Ochs

OCHS may refer to:

- Oaks Christian High School
- Oakland Charter High School, a member school of Amethod Public Schools
- Ocean City High School
- Oregon City High School
- Oxford Centre for Hindu Studies
- Oconee County High School
- Orange Cove High School
- Oak Creek High School
