= Rick Sofield =

American baseball player and coach (born 1956)

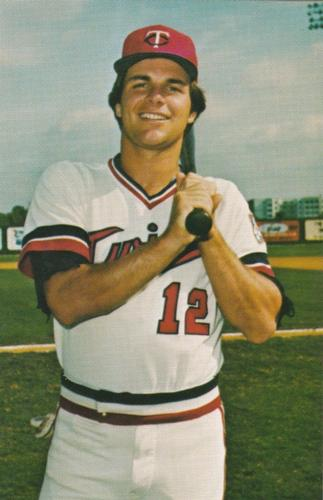
- Outfielder
- Born: December 16, 1956 (age 69); Cheyenne, Wyoming, U.S.
- Batted: Left Threw: Right

MLB debut
- April 6, 1979, for the Minnesota Twins

Last MLB appearance
- October 4, 1981, for the Minnesota Twins

MLB statistics
- Batting average: .243
- Hits: 149
- Home runs: 9
- Stats at Baseball Reference

Teams
- As player: Minnesota Twins (1979–1981); As coach: Pittsburgh Pirates (2013–2016)

Richard Michael Sofield (born December 16, 1956) is an American former Major League Baseball (MLB) outfielder. He was the Pittsburgh Pirates third base coach from 2013 to 2016 and was the manager of their Class-A South Atlantic League team the West Virginia Power during the 2012 season.

== Early life ==
Sofield was born in Cheyenne, Wyoming but moved to Morris Plains, New Jersey as a child. In New Jersey, he played multiple sports and was offered a scholarship to play college football at Michigan but turned it down in order to pursue a professional baseball career.

== Playing career ==
A first round draft pick (13th overall) of the 1975 Major League Baseball draft, Sofield played for the Minnesota Twins from 1979 to 1981, appearing in 207 games and recording 612 at bats for a career average of .243.

In 1979 he was arrested for scalping World Series tickets. He was convicted and paid a $35 fine, as well as $15 in court costs.

After retiring from baseball, Sofield attempted to resume playing football and enrolled at the University of South Carolina to play college football for the Gamecocks. However, after training with the team in the spring of 1983, he was deemed ineligible for the 1983 South Carolina Gamecocks football team on the ground that he had briefly enrolled at the University of Minnesota.

== Coaching career ==
After his playing career ended, he became the assistant baseball coach at the University of South Carolina and later the head coach at the University of Utah (1988–1994). After leaving Utah, he was a minor league manager for the Harrisburg Senators, Las Vegas 51s, and Colorado Springs Sky Sox.

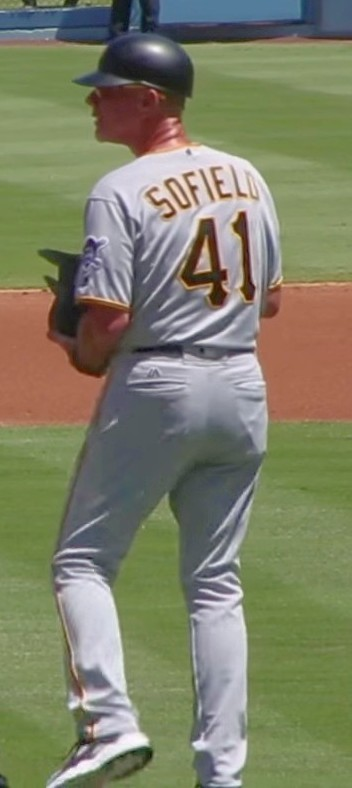
Sofield with the Pittsburgh Pirates

He served as the head baseball coach at USC Beaufort and worked extensively with Baseball Factory, a player development and scouting service. His final day with USCB was Monday, November 14, 2011. Sofield's record with the NAIA Sand Sharks over three seasons was 101–56. In 2011, USCB was ranked No. 18 in the NAIA Top 25, the highest spot in program history.

Sofield and Pirates manager Clint Hurdle first met in 1975 in the minor leagues and have stayed friends ever since. Sofield also previously worked with Pirates general manager Neal Huntington, assistant general manager Kyle Stark, Triple-A Indianapolis manager Dean Treanor, and pitching coordinator Jim Benedict. He served as a coach for the Pittsburgh Pirates under Hurdle from 2013 to 2016 In February 2018, Rick accepted the head varsity coaching position at Hilton Head Preparatory School, in Hilton Head Island, South Carolina.

Sporting positions
Preceded by Chris Cron	Colorado Springs Sky Sox Manager; 2003	Succeeded by Marv Foley
Preceded by Nick Leyva	Pittsburgh Pirates third base coach 2013-2016	Succeeded by Joey Cora
