= Ochs (surname) =

Ochs is a German language surname meaning "ox". Notable people with the surname include:

- Adolph Ochs, newspaper publisher and owner of The New York Times
- Arthur Ochs Sulzberger
- Craig Ochs, American football player
- Elinor Ochs American linguistic anthropologist
- Heinrich Ochs, German Knight's Cross holder
- Jacques Ochs (1883–1971), épée, saber, and foil fencer
- Josef Ochs, German Nazi Kripo officer
- Larry Ochs, jazz saxophonist and composer
- Larry Ochs (politician), American politician from Colorado
- Max Ochs (born 1940), American guitarist, musician
- Michael Ochs (1943–2025), American photographic archivist
- Patrick Ochs, German footballer
- Peter Ochs (1752–1821), Swiss politician and revolutionary
- Peter Ochs (born 1950), Jewish theologian
- Phil Ochs (1940–1976), American singer-songwriter and activist
- Philipp Ochs (born 1997), German footballer
- Robyn Ochs, American bisexual activist, writer, and speaker
- Siegfried Ochs, German composer
- Sonny Ochs, American music producer and radio host
- Timo Ochs, German footballer

== See also ==
- Ochs (disambiguation)
