= Hi-Lo League =

High school athletic league in California

The Hi-Lo League is a high school athletic conference that is affiliated with the CIF Central Section (CIF-CS). Members are small schools in the remote desert regions of eastern California. The league and its schools joined the CIF-CS in 2017; previously, they were part of the CIF Southern Section. The Hi-Lo League sponsors 8-man football. The two farthest schools, Lee Vining and Baker Valley, are 340 miles (550 km) apart—more than 6 hours one-way.

== Members ==
- Baker High School (Baker Valley Unified School District)
- Big Pine High School (Big Pine, California)
- Immanuel Christian School (Ridgecrest, California)
- Lee Vining High School (Lee Vining, California)
- Lone Pine High School
- Owens Valley High School (Independence, California)
- Mojave High School (Mojave, California)
- Trona High School
