= East Sierra League =

High school athletic league in California

The East Sierra League is a high school athletic league that is part of the CIF Central Section.

In 2022, Fresno Christian High School left the league to join the Northwest Sequoia League, and Summit Charter Collegiate Academy and Wonderful College Preparatory Academy left to join the East Sequoia League. Riverdale Christian School and Wonderful College Preparatory Academy (Lost Hills, California) joined the league.

In 2024, Legacy Christian Academy, (Bakersfield, California) joined the league.

There is a seasonal selection of All League players in the scope of sports administered by the league.

== Members ==
- Kings Christian High School
- Laton High School
- Wonderful College Preparatory Academy (Lost Hills, California)
- Alpaugh High School
- Riverdale Christian High School
- Legacy Christian Academy, (Bakersfield, California)
