= Nick Leyva =

American baseball coach and manager (born 1953)

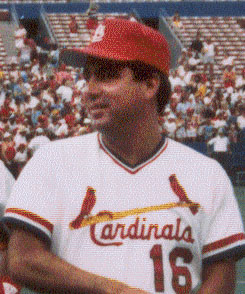
- Leyva coaching for the Cardinals in 1987
- Manager / Coach
- Born: August 16, 1953 (age 73); Ontario, California, U.S.
- Bats: Right Throws: Right

MLB statistics
- Games managed: 337
- Won–loss record: 148–189
- Winning %: .439
- Stats at Baseball Reference
- Managerial record at Baseball Reference

Teams
- As manager: Philadelphia Phillies (1989–1991); As coach: St. Louis Cardinals (1984–1988); Toronto Blue Jays (1993–1997); Milwaukee Brewers (2007); Toronto Blue Jays (2008–2010); Pittsburgh Pirates (2011–2016)

Career highlights and awards
- World Series champion (1993)

Nicholas Tomas Leyva (born August 16, 1953) is an American former professional baseball player, coach, and manager. After his retirement as a Minor League Baseball (MiLB) player, Leyva moved into coaching. His Major League Baseball (MLB) coaching stops included the St. Louis Cardinals, Toronto Blue Jays (on two occasions), Milwaukee Brewers, and Pittsburgh Pirates. Leyva was the manager of the Philadelphia Phillies from 1989 though early 1991.

== Playing career ==
Born in Ontario, California, Leyva, who is of Mexican-American descent, attended the University of LaVerne, and was selected by the St. Louis Cardinals in the 24th round (561st overall) of the 1975 Major League Baseball draft. He was an infielder who threw and batted right-handed, and stood 5 feet 11 inches (180 cm) tall and weighed 165 pounds (75 kg). In three seasons (1975–77) in the Cardinals' farm system, he appeared in 253 games played and batted .267 with 208 hits, eight home runs and 109 runs batted in.

== Managing career ==
Leyva began his managing career at age 24 with the rookie-level Johnson City Cardinals of the Appalachian League in 1978. By 1983, he was manager of the parent Cardinals' Double-A farm team, the Arkansas Travelers of the Texas League.

Leyva served on the big-league coaching staff of Whitey Herzog's Cardinals for five seasons, 1984–1988. He was the first base coach for the National League-champion Cardinals in 1985, and the third base coach for the NL-champion Cardinals in 1987.

In 1989, Leyva was hired as manager of the Phillies by his former farm director in St. Louis, Lee Thomas (who himself was serving as the Phillies' general manager). The Phillies won only 67 of 162 games during Leyva's inaugural season at the helm, and finished last in the National League East Division. In 1990, his team won ten more games and finished fourth, but still played eight games below the .500 mark. When the 1991 Phillies dropped nine of their first 13 games, Leyva was ousted on April 23. His career totals as a Major League manager were 148 victories and 189 losses (.439).

== Coach with Blue Jays, Brewers and Pirates ==
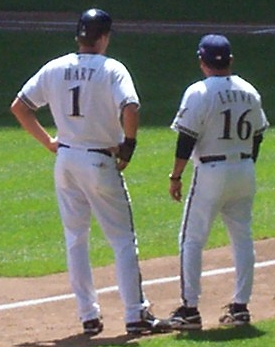
Leyva (right) advising Milwaukee's Corey Hart in 2007

After managing the Toronto Blue Jays' Triple-A farm team, the Syracuse Chiefs, Leyva spent 4 1/2 seasons (July 1993 – 1997) as the third-base coach of the Blue Jays, his first term in the job. As a major league manager and coach, Leyva has worn #16 with every team he has been with, except for his first year in Toronto in 1993, during which he wore #45 as #16 was already taken. He later worked at multiple levels of the Chicago White Sox farm system before spending one season as third-base coach of the Milwaukee Brewers in 2007.

Leyva was listed as the 2008 manager of the Kingsport Mets of the Appalachian League, a rookie-level affiliate of the New York Mets, before the Blue Jays rehired him as their third base coach on June 20, 2008, when Cito Gaston replaced John Gibbons as the club's manager. On October 30, 2009, Leyva was reassigned as the Blue Jays' bench coach, with Brian Butterfield taking over as third base coach for the team. On November 8, 2010, former Seattle Mariners manager Don Wakamatsu was named Toronto's bench coach, ending Leyva's tenure at that post.

On November 24, 2010, Leyva was named the Pittsburgh Pirates' third base coach, under new manager Clint Hurdle. On November 5, 2014, the Pirates announced that Leyva would be moved to first base coach and Rick Sofield would move from first base to third base. On October 22, 2016, the Pirates announced that Leyva was reassigned within the organization to an advisory position and would no longer coach.

== Coach in Venezuela ==
Leyva managed the Cardenales de Lara of the Venezuelan Professional Baseball League in 1995–1996 season, leading them to the finals where they lost against the Navegantes del Magallanes, four games to three. For the 2000–2001 season, he again managed the Cardenales, leading them to his fourth championship in Venezuela, defeating the team that defeated him four years before in six games. Seven years later, he returned to Venezuela to manage the Navegantes del Magallanes in the 2008–2009 season, but was dismissed because of the team's poor record.

Leyva's younger brother, Al, is the manager of the Willmar Stingers of the Northwoods League.

== See also ==
- List of St. Louis Cardinals coaches
