= Parlier, California =

City in California, United States

City of Parlier
- City
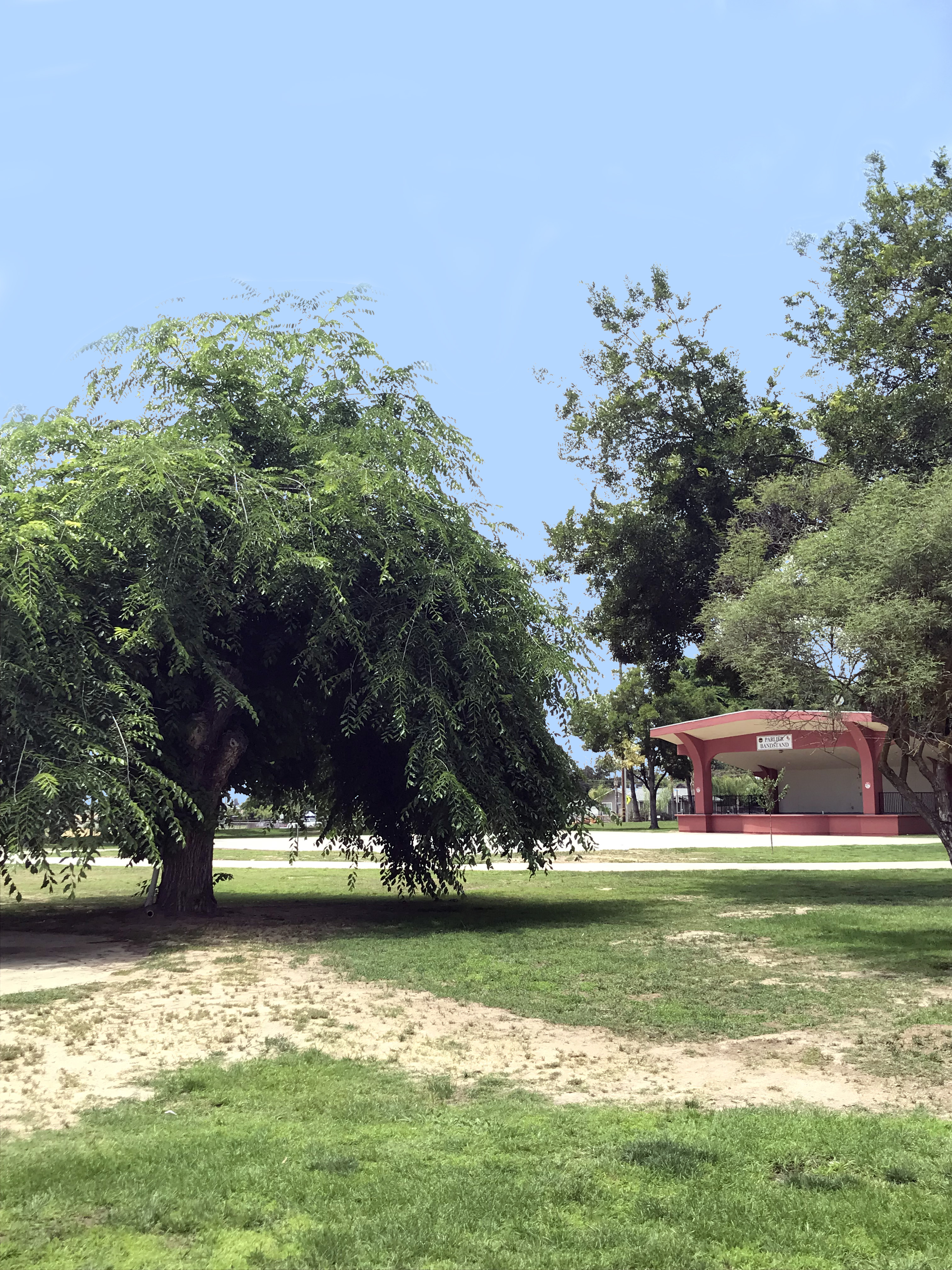
- Earl Ruth Park

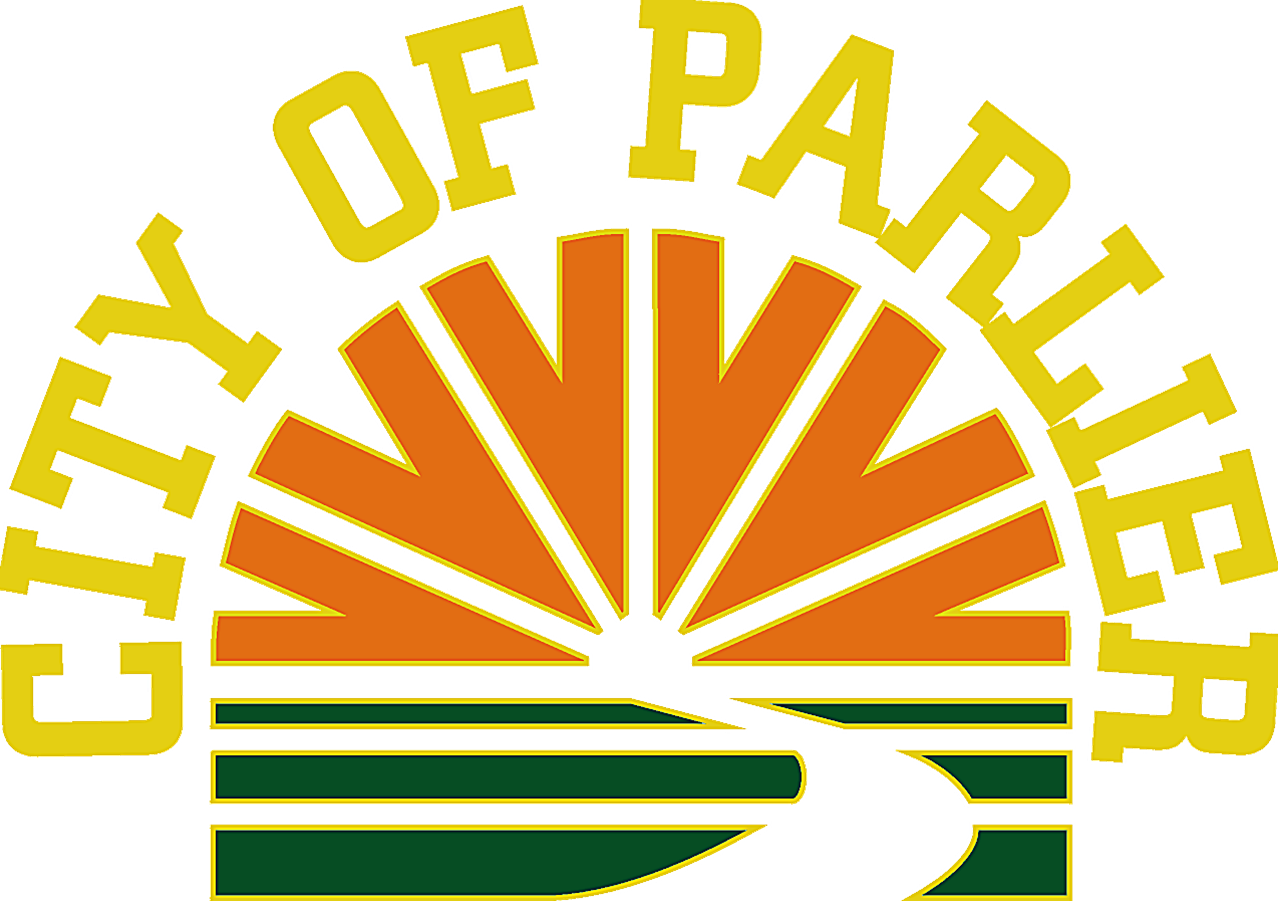
- Seal
- Interactive map of City of Parlier
- Location in the United States
- Coordinates: 36°36′42″N 119°31′37″W
- Country: United States
- State: California
- County: Fresno
- Incorporated: November 15, 1921

Government
  - State Senator: Anna Caballero (D)
  - Assemblymember: Joaquin Arambula (D)
  - U. S. Rep.: Jim Costa (D)

Area
  - Total: 2.41 sq mi (6.24 km^{2})
  - Land: 2.41 sq mi (6.24 km^{2})
  - Water: 0 sq mi (0.00 km^{2}) 0%
- Elevation: 344 ft (105 m)

Population (2020)
  - Total: 14,576
  - Density: 6,050/sq mi (2,340/km^{2})
- Time zone: UTC-8 (PST)
  - Summer (DST): UTC-7 (PDT)
- ZIP code: 93648
- Area code: 559
- FIPS code: 06-55856
- GNIS feature IDs: 1659348, 2411376
- Website: www.parlier.ca.us

Parlier is a city in Fresno County, California, United States. As of the 2020 census, the city had a total population of 14,576, up from 14,494 in 2010. The city has one of the state's highest percentage of Latinos, a large majority of whom are seasonal migrant laborers who arrive and temporarily work in the area's agricultural sector. Parlier is located 5.5 miles (9 km) east-northeast of Selma, at an elevation of 344 feet (105 m).

== Geography ==
According to the United States Census Bureau, the city has a total area of 2.4 square miles (6.2 km^{2}), all land.

== History and culture ==
In 1876, the I.N. Parlier family migrated from Springfield, Illinois to the present site of Parlier. The family's name, and city's namesake, was derived from DeParlier, their French ancestry. The Parlier family's general store, trading post and post office became the center of town. Small, family-run wheat farms were initially cultivated in the area. Wheat soon gave way to grapes, raisins and tree fruit, foods that Parlier continues to produce. Improved irrigation systems and arrival of the Atchison, Topeka and Santa Fe Railway helped Parlier establish itself as a hub among surrounding communities.

=== Public schools ===
Parlier has four elementary schools, one junior high school, and one high school. In addition, there is a preschool and Head Start program, as well as continuing education.

== Demographics ==
Historical population
Census	Pop.	Note	%±
1930	564		—
1940	776		37.6%
1950	1,419		82.9%
1960	1,366		−3.7%
1970	1,993		45.9%
1980	2,902		45.6%
1990	7,938		173.5%
2000	11,145		40.4%
2010	14,494		30.0%
2020	14,576		0.6%
U.S. Decennial Census

=== 2020 census ===
As of the 2020 census, Parlier had a population of 14,576 and a population density of 6,050.6 inhabitants per square mile (2,336.1/km^{2}). The census reported that the entire population lived in households.

The age distribution was 33.8% under the age of 18, 11.1% aged 18 to 24, 27.0% aged 25 to 44, 19.7% aged 45 to 64, and 8.5% aged 65 or older. The median age was 28.4 years. For every 100 females, there were 102.4 males, and for every 100 females age 18 and over there were 97.2 males age 18 and over.

There were 3,588 households, of which 60.2% had children under the age of 18 living in them. Of all households, 51.8% were married-couple households, 8.5% were cohabiting-couple households, 15.2% were households with a male householder and no spouse or partner present, and 24.5% were households with a female householder and no spouse or partner present. About 9.5% of all households were made up of individuals, and 3.8% had someone living alone who was 65 years of age or older. The average household size was 4.06. There were 3,096 families (86.3% of all households).

There were 3,853 housing units at an average density of 1,599.4 units per square mile (617.5 units/km^{2}). Of housing units, 6.9% were vacant. Among occupied units, 49.6% were owner-occupied and 50.4% were renter-occupied. The homeowner vacancy rate was 0.8% and the rental vacancy rate was 2.0%.

99.6% of residents lived in urban areas, while 0.4% lived in rural areas.

Racial composition as of the 2020 census
Race	Number	Percent
White	2,914	20.0%
Black or African American	41	0.3%
American Indian and Alaska Native	240	1.6%
Asian	66	0.5%
Native Hawaiian and Other Pacific Islander	4	0.0%
Some other race	7,894	54.2%
Two or more races	3,417	23.4%
Hispanic or Latino (of any race)	14,227	97.6%

=== 2023 ACS estimates ===
In 2023, the US Census Bureau estimated that 37.2% of the population were foreign-born. Of all people aged 5 or older, 19.3% spoke only English at home and 80.7% spoke Spanish. Of those aged 25 or older, 51.7% were high school graduates and 4.8% had a bachelor's degree.

The median household income in 2023 was $50,910, and the per capita income was $16,978. About 27.1% of families and 29.9% of the population were below the poverty line.

=== 2010 census ===
At the 2010 census Parlier had a population of 14,494. The population density was 6,606.9 inhabitants per square mile (2,550.9/km^{2}). The racial makeup of Parlier was 7,251 (50.0%) White, 85 (0.6%) African American, 180 (1.2%) Native American, 77 (0.5%) Asian, 9 (0.1%) Pacific Islander, 6,387 (44.1%) from other races, and 505 (3.5%) from two or more races. Hispanic or Latino of any race were 14,137 persons (97.5%).

The census reported that 14,492 people (100% of the population) lived in households, 2 (0%) lived in non-institutionalized group quarters, and no one was institutionalized.

There were 3,297 households, 2,276 (69.0%) had children under the age of 18 living in them, 1,950 (59.1%) were opposite-sex married couples living together, 662 (20.1%) had a female householder with no husband present, 339 (10.3%) had a male householder with no wife present. There were 288 (8.7%) unmarried opposite-sex partnerships, and 31 (0.9%) same-sex married couples or partnerships. 239 households (7.2%) were one person and 107 (3.2%) had someone living alone who was 65 or older. The average household size was 4.40. There were 2,951 families (89.5% of households); the average family size was 4.46.

The age distribution was 5,378 people (37.1%) under the age of 18, 1,841 people (12.7%) aged 18 to 24, 4,103 people (28.3%) aged 25 to 44, 2,375 people (16.4%) aged 45 to 64, and 797 people (5.5%) who were 65 or older. The median age was 25.1 years. For every 100 females, there were 104.9 males. For every 100 females age 18 and over, there were 106.3 males.

There were 3,494 housing units at an average density of 1,592.7 units per square mile (614.9 units/km^{2}), of which 3,297 were occupied, 1,524 (46.2%) by the owners and 1,773 (53.8%) by renters. The homeowner vacancy rate was 1.3%; the rental vacancy rate was 3.7%. 6,936 people (47.9% of the population) lived in owner-occupied housing units and 7,556 people (52.1%) lived in rental housing units.

== Education ==
Most of the city is served by the Parlier Unified School District; a section is within the Selma Unified School District.

== Notable people ==
- Charles Dwight “Red” Adams, baseball player, scout and pitching coach for the Los Angeles Dodgers
- Vern Mikkelsen, NBA Hall of Famer, was born in Parlier

== Sister cities ==
- Ensenada, Mexico
