= Tsuyako Kitashima =

Japanese-American activist

- Born: Tsukayo May Kataoka; 1918
- Died: December 29, 2005 (aged 86–87)

Tsuyako "Sox" Kitashima (1918 – December 29, 2005) was a Japanese-American activist noted for her role in seeking reparations for Japanese American internment by the United States government during World War II, particularly as investigated by the Commission on Wartime Relocation and Internment of Civilians in the 1980s.

Kitashima was born Tsuyako May Kataoka in 1918 in Hayward, California, to Masajiro Kataoka and Yumi Ishimaru, who had emigrated from Yamaguchi Prefecture, Japan and owned a strawberry farm in Eden Township, Alameda County, California. She was the fifth child of the family's six children. At school, her classmates were unable to pronounce her name, calling her "Socko" instead; this in time was further shortened to "Sox". Kitashima's family moved from Eden to Centerville, Alameda County, California (now a district of Fremont), where she graduated from Washington Union High School in 1936.

Following the Japanese attack on Pearl Harbor on December 7, 1941, and signing of Executive Order 9066, Kitashima and her family were among those 120,000 Japanese Americans interned into relocation camps. They were kept in horse stalls at Tanforan, California, and moved four months later to a single room at Topaz War Relocation Center in Utah. Within a year, the rest of the Kataokas family, except one of Kitashima's sister were moved to Tule Lake. On August 11 1945, Tsuyako married Tamotsu “Tom” Kitashima in the camp at Topaz.

She later became a spokesperson for the National Coalition for Redress and Reparations, and fought for the Civil Liberties Act of 1988, by which the American government formally apologized and granted reparations to the wartime internees. In 1998, The Freedom Forum awarded her a Free Spirit Award, which came with US$10,000. She has also been recognized by the National Women's History Project as a National Women's History Month/Week honoree.

Kitashima died of a heart attack in a care home in San Francisco, California on December 29, 2005, aged 87.
