= Farmersville High School (California) =

Coordinates: 36°18′N 119°12′W

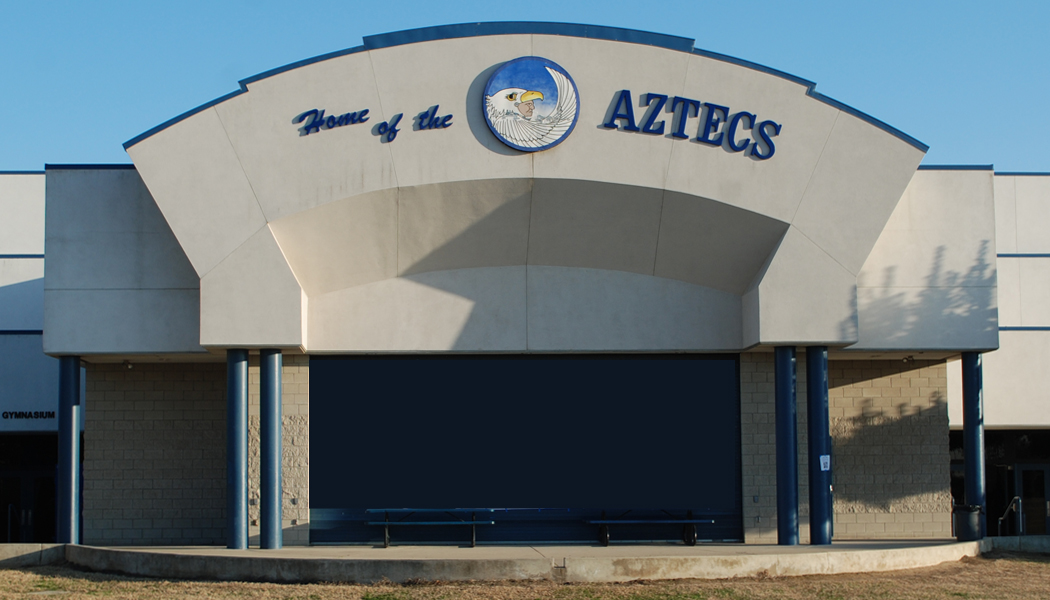
- 631 East Walnut Avenue; Farmersville, California; United States

Information
- Type: Public
- Motto: Commitment to Excellence
- School district: Farmersville Unified School District
- Principal: Emily Koop
- Teaching staff: 34.93 (FTE)
- Grades: 9–12
- Enrollment: 728 (2023-2024)
- Student to teacher ratio: 20.84
- Campus type: Rural
- Colors: Navy blue, silver, white
- Mascot: Aztecs
- Website: www.farmersville.k12.ca.us/Domain/9

Farmersville High School (abbr. FHS) is a public American senior high school set in Farmersville, California, United States. The school is part of the Farmersville Unified School District, which takes in the majority of students from its K-8 program.

== Academics ==
Following the class of 2015, all students enrolled at FHS must at least meet the following criteria before graduation:

- 4 years of English (40 credits)
- 3 years of Mathematics (30 credits)
- Freshmen Studies (10 credits)
- World History (10 credits)
- Us History (10 credits)
- Government Economics (10 credits)
- Life Science (10 credits)
- Physical Science (10 credits)
- Physical Education (20 credits)
- Fine Arts/Non-English Language/CTE (10 credits)
- Electives (90 credits)

In total, 250 credits are necessary for a student to graduate.

== Athletics ==
FHS sports teams are called the Aztecs and play their home games on campus. The Aztecs participate in the East Sequoia League CIF Central Section and have varsity, JV and freshman/sophomore teams. The sports that FHS participates in and their respective seasons are:

- Fall
  - Cross country
  - Girls' volleyball
  - American football
- Winter
  - Boys' basketball
  - Girls' basketball
  - Boys' soccer
  - Girls' soccer
  - Wrestling
- Spring
  - Baseball
  - Softball
  - Track and field

In 2019, the new Jim Wiley Aquatic Center opened.
