= Washington Union High School =

High school in California, United States

Coordinates: 36.64772°N 119.79206°W

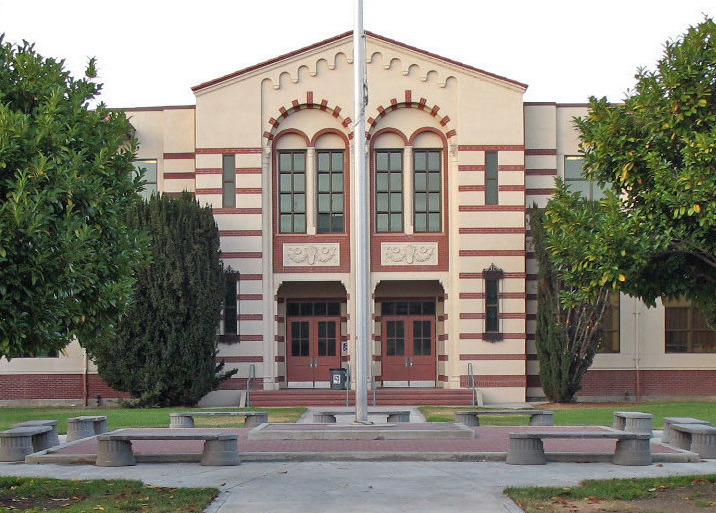

Information
- Established: 1892; 134 years ago
- School district: Washington Unified School District
- Enrollment: 1,115 (2023–2024)
- Colors: Purple, white, grey, and black
- Mascot: Panthers
- Website: www.wuhs.washingtonunified.org

Washington Union High School is a high school in the rural community of Easton in Fresno County, California. It is a part of the Washington Unified School District. Founded in 1892 (and first accredited in 1965), Washington Union is most likely the second oldest high school in Fresno County (Fresno High School being established three years earlier in 1889). The school district encompasses roughly 90 square miles in the heart of the central San Joaquin Valley. The mascot for Washington Union is the Panthers, with school colors being purple, white, grey, and black. The school has a large and diverse population of students from the Fresno metropolitan area.

== District ==
Washington Union was one of the few schools in Fresno County that operated as a single school district until becoming unified in 2011 with two feeder schools, American Union Elementary and West Fresno Elementary. American Union serves the areas to the west of Easton, while West Fresno serves the area between Fresno and Easton. In addition to West Fresno and American Union, it is fed by four other schools in the area that operate their own elementary and middle schools: Orange Center, Pacific Union, Washington Colony, and West Park. The new K-12 district serves over 2,560 students. The school boasts a variety of programs such as: Agriculture, Academic Decathlon, Health-Institute, Music, Construction, Architecture, Robotics , After School Program, Gifted and Talented Education (GATE), Link Crew, Migrant, Safe School Ambassadors and a newly created Criminal Justice Academy.

The district covers several areas for all grades PK-12, including sections of Fresno. The district covers some areas for grades 9-12 only. Those areas include other parts of Fresno, as well as all of Bowles and Easton, as well as most of West Park.

== Grade academies ==
Washington Union is split into three academies. The Freshman Academy is located at the south end of the school. The Sophomore Academy is located at the north end of the school, just east of the Panther Academy, which serves juniors and seniors. There is also a main administration building at the north end of the school, which houses the principal and is the main point of entry for visitors. That administration office was formerly the district office before the district became unified and moved the district office to temporary buildings at West Fresno Elementary.

== The Hatchet ==
The Hatchet is the student newspaper at Washington Union High School. Students write about anything ranging from music, entertainment, sports, school news, community news, and more. The students who write the Hatchet are very dedicated as well.

== Measure W ==
In November 2012, voters in the Washington Unified School district were asked to vote on "Measure W." The bond passed with almost 73 percent. A 55 percent supermajority was required. Measure W is a $22 million bond measure for school improvements. The first goal for the bond was the updating of the football stadium.

MEASURE W: "To better prepare Washington Union High School students for college and quality jobs, shall Washington Unified School District upgrade technology in classrooms, job-training labs, and student- support facilities; modernize science labs; rehabilitate deteriorated roofs, plumbing, electrical, lighting, ventilation; improve safety; and acquire/construct/repair instructional and athletic sites, facilities and equipment; by issuing $22,000,000 in bonds at legal interest rates, with independent citizen oversight, no administrators' salaries, and all funds dedicated locally to Washington Union High School?"

In-progress improvements include:

- New drop-off zone for students.
- Improved access through campus.
- Replace roofs.
- Upgrade technology.
- Renovations and reconstruction to athletic facilities.

== Football program ==
In 2011, the Washington Union Panthers won the CIF Division III state football championship, becoming the first team from the Central Section to win a championship in the six-year history of the Bowl State Championships. Under the coaching of Jeff Freitas, the Panthers beat Campolindo of Moraga by a score of 21–16. Freitas stepped away from the head coaching job after the season, becoming the school's athletic director. Washington Union went 119-50 (.704) with one losing season in Freitas's 14 years at the school, including additional section titles in 1999 and 2010. The football program currently competes in the Tri-County Athletic Conference

== Baseball program ==
The Washington Union baseball program has won a total of six Central Section divisional championships. The baseball program currently competes in the Tri-County Athletic Conference.

The most recent championship came in 2010, as the Panthers defeated Kerman 8–7; they also won the Division IV state championship, the school's first. The Panthers won the section title in 2009 by defeating Selma 2–1. The program became a powerhouse as they put up a record of 109-25 from 2007 to 2010 under Coach Mike Curran. Curran led the Panthers to the 2010 Division IV State Championship, two Section Championships, four Chowchilla Tournament Championships, and one Fowler Easter Classic Championships.

== Current administration ==
- Randy Morris, Superintendent
- Javier Gamboa, Principal

== Notable alumni ==
- Tsuyako Kitashima (1936), Japanese-American activist known for her work in getting reparations for Japanese American internment
- Maxie Parks (1969), track and field athlete, Olympic gold medalist
- Dennis Springer (1983), former MLB pitcher
- Shamell Stallworth (1999), basketball player who plays professionally in Brazil
- DeShawn Stevenson (2000), former NBA player
- Matt Garza (2001), former MLB pitcher
- Maurice Shaw (2004 - transferred), former basketball player
- Tory Horton (2020), wide receiver for the Seattle Seahawks
