= West Sierra League =

High school athletic league in California

The West Sierra League is a high school athletic league that is part of the CIF Central Section.

There is a seasonal selection of All League players in the scope of sports administered by the league.

== Members ==
- Avenal High School
- Firebaugh High School
- Coalinga High School
- Mendota High School
- Dos Palos High School
- Tranquillity High School
