= Baker Valley Unified School District =

School district in California, United States

Address
- 72100 School House Lane Baker, California, 92309; United States

District information
- Motto: Creating excellence, whatever it takes.
- Grades: K–12
- NCES District ID: 0603610

Students and staff
- Students: 127 (2020–2021)
- Teachers: 11.65 (FTE)
- Staff: 6.77 (FTE)
- Student–teacher ratio: 10.9:1
- District mascot: Braves

Other information
- Website: www.baker.k12.ca.us

Baker Valley Unified School District is a public school district based in San Bernardino County, California, United States.

The district covers the Baker census-designated place.
