= Parlier High School =

Location
- 601 Third St; Parlier, Fresno County, California 93648; United States; 36°36′34″N 119°32′10″W

Information
- Type: Public
- School district: Parlier Unified School District
- Principal: Sara Soria
- Teaching staff: 52.51 (FTE)
- Grades: 9-12
- Enrollment: 928 (2023-2024)
- Student to teacher ratio: 17.67
- Colors: Blue and gold
- Athletics conference: CIF Central Section Northwest Sequoia League
- Mascot: Panther
- Website: phs.parlierunified.org

Parlier High School (PHS) is a public high school in Parlier, California, United States.

Parlier High School serves grades 9-12 in the Parlier Unified School District. Based on its state test results, it has received a GreatSchools Rating of 4 out of 10.

== Demographics ==
During the 2006-2007 school year, 894 students were enrolled at Parlier High School, of which 8% were students with disabilities, 42.6% were English Learners, and 99% were socioeconomically disadvantaged. The student population is 97.9% Hispanic or Latino.

== Athletics ==
The school's mascot is the Mighty Panther. The school's colors are Blue & Gold. Parlier High School competes in sports in the CIF Central Section and play in the Northwest Sequoia League (NWSL). The sports at PHS include:

	Fall	Winter	Spring
Boys	Cross Country	Basketball	Baseball
	Football	Soccer	Track & Field
		Wrestling	
Girls	Cross Country	Basketball	Softball
	Volleyball	Soccer	Track & Field
		Wrestling	

== Academics ==
During the 2006-2007 school year, 894 students were enrolled at the school. - Parlier Academics include:

- California A-G requirements
- Advanced Placement

== School publications ==
The school publications are:

The Arrow (School Yearbook)

== Notable alumni ==
- Billy Evangelista, mixed martial artist
