= Baseball Factory =

American sports company

- Founded: 1994
- Founder: Steve Sclafani
- Number of locations: Columbia; Maryland
- Area served: USA
- Key people: Steve Sclafani (CEO)
- Services: Baseball player development
- Website: www.baseballfactory.com

Baseball Factory, Inc. is a United States company specializing in player development and college placement of high school baseball players. The company is headquartered in Columbia, Maryland, approximately 20 miles southwest of Baltimore. Over six hundred events, across all 50 states, are hosted by Baseball Factory throughout the year, ranging from national tryouts to camps, tournaments and showcases. As of 2017, Baseball Factory has helped over 100,000 baseball players compete at the college level, garnering more than $1 billion in scholarships.

Baseball Factory was founded in 1994 by CEO Steve Sclafani, to provide a service that would train and educate players on the college recruiting process. In 2004, Baseball Factory acquired Team One Baseball, a baseball company for top-flight showcases. Baseball Factory provides high school baseball players with professional instruction, showcase opportunities, tournaments, and ongoing guidance in the college recruiting process.

== History ==
Baseball Factory was founded in 1994 in Columbia, Maryland by current CEO Steve Sclafani, in order to train and educate high school players on the college recruiting process. Alongside Baseball Factory, Inc., an inner-city middle school baseball program called B.A.S.E.-H.I.T. Foundation (presently the Baseball Factory Team One Foundation) was also launched. As the B.A.S.E.-H.I.T. Foundation continued to evolve in downtown Baltimore, Baseball Factory took their program nationwide. By 1997, the program reached over 1,000 players from 46 different states and had placed 90% of their players in a college baseball program.

In 1999, the National High School Baseball Coaches Association recognized Baseball Factory as the number one recruiting service in the country. The company also reached the $20 million mark in scholarship money offered to Baseball Factory players. By 2002, Baseball Factory players had received over $65 million in college scholarships. In addition, former Major League manager for the Colorado Rockies, and the Pittsburgh Pirates, Clint Hurdle, joined the Baseball Factory team as a hitting advisor.

The summer of 2005 marked the first ever Baseball Express Cape Cod High School Classic, powered by the Baseball Factory. The game featured 36 of the best rising senior and junior high school baseball players in the nation, including 17 future selections in Major League Baseball’s amateur draft.

On January 1, 2007, Under Armour selected Baseball Factory as the amateur baseball company to launch their baseball products through a grassroots effort. This partnership has included the Under Armour All-America Game, powered by Baseball Factory and held at Wrigley Field in Chicago, Illinois, bringing together 40 of the top high school athletes in the country, selected by a committee of Baseball Factory scouts. Since the game's inception in 2008, 284 of the 323 draft eligible players from the Under Armour All-America Game were selected in the MLB Amateur Draft including 83 first round picks. In 2017, the game celebrates its 10th anniversary, and will again be broadcast on MLB Network.

In March, 2009, Baseball Factory announced a strategic partnership with Little League International in order to provide youth players worldwide with increased player development and college placement opportunities. Little League International named Baseball Factory as the Exclusive and Official Player Development Partner of Little League Baseball. The primary focus of the partnership is the Little League Youth Clinic and Skills Challenges, powered by Baseball Factory. Baseball Factory conducts these events for Little and Junior League division players. The events are held at Little League, minor league, college and high school facilities nationwide.

In July, 2009, Baseball Factory partnered with American Legion Baseball in order to provide amateur players with new opportunities to develop their skills. Together the organizations will provide American Legion players with instructional camps, showcases and baseball clinics to supplement their experience with their local American Legion team.

In 2010, Baseball Factory teamed up with Roberto's Kids, an international non-profit organization, and the Pittsburgh Pirates to host an equipment drive that sent donated baseball gear to underprivileged communities around the world.

In February 2011, after 16 years of success assisting baseball players, the organization announced the launch of Softball Factory, a new division of Baseball Factory. Softball Factory was created to provide authentic training and college recruiting programs for youth and high school softball players. Softball Factory is led by Lea Ann Jarvis, the Director of Softball Operations. Lea Ann was a two-time First Team NCAA All-American while a standout performer at Louisiana Tech University. She went on to coach Division I college softball for 17 years and also played professionally. She then won two World Championships as a player with the USA National Softball Team. In addition to Lea Ann's experience, the Softball Factory's coaching staff of former college coaches, former professional players and former college players provides expert softball training and guidance for players nationwide. In January 2017, Softball Factory welcomed USA Olympic Gold Medalist and former collegiate All-American at the University of Arizona, Jennie Finch to the All-America Pre-Season Tournament held at the Scrapyard Sports Complex in Conroe, Texas where she spoke to players and their families during the welcome meeting and worked on-field with both pitchers and catchers.

Looking to build upon the success of Baseball and Softball divisions, Volleyball Factory is launched in 2013, led by former National Player of the Year and All-American at UCLA, Kristee Porter and the company transforms into Factory Athletics. Volleyball Factory now hosts over 40 events across in the country as well as high-level Player Development events such as Select Training at the NCAA Championship in that year's host city, Advanced Training in Colorado Springs, CO and at the Lake Placid Training Center in Lake Placid, NY. The American Volleyball Coaches Association (AVCA) recognized Volleyball Factory as the Preferred Player ID Partner of AVCA Volleyball. This partnership allows Volleyball Factory to review all players attending an Under Armour Volleyball Factory National Tryout or College PREP event and recommend top players to the AVCA for Under Armour All-American Match and Phenom Program consideration.

Volleyball Factory teamed with DataVolley to provide players with an edge in the recruiting process. The top-rated DataVolley system is used at every Under Armour National Tryout and College PREP event and the video-capture software is used by nearly every collegiate program. Using DataVolley, the player videos record each player performing at their very best during live in-game action in a statistically relevant way.

In 2017, Baseball Factory continues to see a growing number of former alums reaching their dreams of playing collegiate baseball as 100% of NCAA Division I & II rosters and 96% of Division III rosters have at least one Factory alum on a roster. 41% of the players who played in the 2017 NCAA Division I College World Series were Factory alums.

== Team One acquisition ==
In 2004, Baseball Factory acquired Team One Baseball, a baseball company for top-flight showcases. Team One Baseball hosts showcases throughout the country for top players to perform in front of college coaches and professional scouts. Together, Baseball Factory and Team One Baseball have assisted players in obtaining over $500 million in college scholarships.

== Notable alumni ==
- Bryce Harper - Washington Nationals
- Kris Bryant - Chicago Cubs
- Anthony Rizzo - Chicago Cubs
- Francisco Lindor - Cleveland Indians
- George Springer - Houston Astros
- Alex Bregman - Houston Astros
- Josh Donaldson - Toronto Blue Jays
- Eric Hosmer - San Diego Padres
- Addison Russell - Chicago Cubs
- Rick Porcello - Boston Red Sox
- Nick Castellanos - Detroit Tigers
- Stephen Vogt - Milwaukee Brewers
- Byron Buxton - Minnesota Twins
- David Wright - New York Mets
- Mark Teixeira - New York Yankees
- CC Sabathia – New York Yankees
- Justin Verlander – Houston Astros
- Roy Halladay – Philadelphia Phillies
- Josh Hamilton – Los Angeles Angels
- Ryan Braun – Milwaukee Brewers
- Ian Kinsler – Los Angeles Angels
- Prince Fielder – Detroit Tigers
- Brian Roberts – Baltimore Orioles
- Brian McCann – Houston Astros
- Carlos Quentin – San Diego Padres
- Sean Rodriguez - Tampa Bay Rays
- Sam Fuld - Tampa Bay Rays
- Doug Waechter - Tampa Bay Rays
- James Shields - San Diego Padres
- Eric Chavez - New York Yankees
- Zack Greinke - Arizona Diamondbacks
- Delmon Young - Detroit Tigers
- BJ Upton - Atlanta Braves
- Justin Upton - Arizona Diamondbacks
- Kelly Shoppach - Boston Red Sox
- Chris Iannetta - Los Angeles Angels
- Jeff Francoeur - Kansas City Royals
- Jay Bruce - New York Mets
- Huston Street - San Diego Padres
- JP Howell - Tampa Bay Rays
- David Robertson - New York Yankees
- Jameson Taillon - Pittsburgh Pirates
- J.J. Hardy - Baltimore Orioles

== Services ==
National tryouts
The Factory provides instruction, tournament competition, and college planning and placement to high school baseball players nationwide. Together with Under Armour, Baseball Factory holds over 100 Under Armour Baseball Factory National Tryouts throughout the year. The tryouts are conducted as pro-style workouts and players are evaluated. Players who attend the national tryouts also become eligible for selection to Under Armour Baseball Factory National Tournaments, Training events and Showcases.
College Recruiting Programs
Baseball Factory offers college recruiting programs, including the Under Armour Baseball Factory National Tryout & College PREP (Premium, Recruiting, Evaluation Program) and the Exclusive College Recruiting Program. The Under Armour Baseball Factory National Tryout & College PREP offers players a professional video of their pro-style workout, as well as an evaluation from a professional scout. In addition, players receive a personal player web page and contact information for over 1,600 college coaches. College recruiting information and inclusion in the online database from which college coaches search daily is also included in the PREP. The Exclusive B.A.T.S. Program offers players the chance, in addition to the services provided in the PREP, to speak to personal recruiting directors throughout their college recruiting process. The program provides players with assistance in forming a realistic prospective college list, as well as guidance in contacting and communicating with college coaches. Each player receives personal assistance to further their academic and athletic career at the collegiate level. The Exclusive B.A.T.S. Program provides instruction on college recruiting, academic development, player development and life skills.
Player Development
Through mini-camps and specialty training camps held across the country, Baseball Factory offers players the opportunity to strengthen their game. Mini-camp events give players a chance to work on a more specific aspect of their game, such as hitting or pitching and catching. Baseball Factory also conducts week-long training camps for players to improve their game, including the Omaha National World Series, an event held in Omaha, Nebraska and at Iowa Western Community College, home of the Reivers baseball program, Baseball Factory National World Series and the Christmas Camp & Tournament at Pirate City, the Southern Home of Baseball Factory and the professional spring training facility of the Pittsburgh Pirates. Cape Cod Select Training & Competition, an event held at the home of the Wareham Gatemen in the Cape Cod Baseball League.
Training/Lessons
At their facility in Columbia, Maryland, Baseball Factory offers one-on-one and small group instruction to high school and youth players.
Showcase/Tournament
Baseball Factory and Team One Baseball hold numerous tournaments sponsored by Under Armour throughout the year. These regional events showcase 100-180 of the best upcoming high school players in the nation in front of college coaches and professional scouts.

== Partners and sponsors ==
Baseball Factory is partnered with a number of companies in the industry. In 2007, Baseball Factory entered a multi-year partnership with Under Armour, who became the title sponsor for various Baseball Factory and Team One Baseball events. These events include the Under Armour All-America Game, Under Armour Baseball Factory National Tryouts, Under Armour National Teams, Under Armour Baseball Factory National Training Camps and Under Armour Showcases, powered by Team One.

Baseball Factory is a Premier Scouting Partner for Baseball America, the leading source in the nation for in-depth articles on high school, college, minor league and major league baseball players. Baseball Factory's scouting staff provides Baseball America with detailed scouting reports on the thousands of players seen throughout the year.

Baseball Factory announced a strategic partnership with "Little League International" in March 2009 in order to provide youth players worldwide with increased player development and college placement opportunities. Little League International named Baseball Factory as the Exclusive and Official Player Development Partner of Little League Baseball.

In July, 2009, Baseball Factory and The American Legion formed a partnership to provide baseball players nationwide with increased player development and college placement opportunities.

Diamond Sports, a leading sports manufacturer specializing in baseball products, entered a strategic partnership with Baseball Factory on July 31, 2009. As the Official Baseball of Baseball Factory, Diamond Sports will have a presence at all events including the Under Armour All-America game, powered by Baseball Factory.

Baseball Factory announced a partnership with EyeBlack.com in November 2011. EyeBlack.com, the official EyeBlack of athletes and fans, will have a significant presence at Baseball Factory events.

2012 proved to be a banner year with the announcements of partnerships with major organizations to increase the overall experience for Baseball Factory athletes.

Baseball Factory announced the formation of a partnership with HeavySwing, the original handle-weighted training bat.

In November 2012, Baseball Factory announced a partnership with Easton, joining forces with a powerhouse in the industry to help create a unique player experience at Baseball Factory events, nationwide. At the time, 25,000 Baseball Factory players gained access to the EASTON HIT LAB™, a complete system that leverages bat analytics and cognitive training to provide players with feedback and information about their swings. In 2016, Easton and Factory Athletics announced an expanded partnership that incorporated the EASTON Hit Lab into signature events for Softball Factory as well.

In February 2013, Baseball Factory formed a strategic partnership with DICK'S Sporting Goods, the largest U.S. based full-line sporting goods retailer to become the Official Sporting Goods Supplier for the Factory and work with DICK'S to serve as the on-field instructional partner for the DICK’S Sporting Goods Baseball Training Experience.

In 2014, Baseball Factory teamed up with Bowman Baseball to become the official card of Baseball Factory. The partnership reaches thousands of serious ballplayers through numerous grassroots efforts. Bowman will also serve as the presenting partner for all draft coverage completed by Baseball Factory. This will include draft videos and articles promoted through the Baseball Factory web site.

In 2015, Baseball Factory announced the formation of a strategic partnership with Pocket Radar, provider of innovative speed measurement technology designed for coaching and training. Pocket Radar's Ball Coach model is the Official Radar Gun of Baseball Factory and is integrated into all Baseball and Softball Factory events across the nation. Baseball and Softball Factory uses the Ball Coach radar to capture player data for use in evaluation and training. This data is provided directly to players, parents and coaches to give them a framework for where they stand nationwide and how to continue their on-field success.

Baseball Factory announced the formation of a strategic partnership with Babe Ruth Baseball to become their Official Player Development Partner in early 2017. The partnership provides youth players with new opportunities to develop their baseball skills and fulfill their dream of playing in college. The organizations will work together to continue promoting mental and physical development for athletes within the Babe Ruth League.

In January 2017, Baseball Factory announced the formation of a strategic partnership with PONY Baseball & Softball as their Official Player Development Partner, providing amateur players across the country with new opportunities to develop their baseball and softball skills. The organizations will work together to provide PONY members with accelerated training events, showcases and baseball and softball clinics to supplement their experience with their local PONY Baseball and Softball teams.

For the second consecutive year, Baseball Factory was selected as a supporter and fully compliant organization of Major League Baseball's Pitch Smart and Play Ball Initiatives, providing safe pitching practices to help reduce the risk of arm injuries in amateur players.

Dedicated to continue education players on the importance of injury prevention and pinpointing areas for improvement, Motus Global, the leader in human performance and biomechanics, becomes the Official Sports Injury Prevention Partner of Baseball Factory in March 2017. Motus works to deliver technology to help maximize performance and reduce the risk of injury in athletics and the workplace. Baseball Factory will use the motusTHROW device to capture player data for use in injury prevention and training. This data will have a major impact on how players use and train their throwing arm, providing them with important analysis of the stress on their arm, arm angle/slot, arm speed and shoulder rotation.

== Executive team summary ==
The Baseball Factory executive team is led by partners Steve Sclafani, CEO/Founder, and Rob Naddelman, President. Steve, a former collegiate baseball player at the University of Pennsylvania, started Baseball Factory in 1994 in his hometown of Columbia, Maryland. He is joined on the executive team by:

- Rob Naddelman, President;
- Steve Bernhardt, Executive VP of Baseball Operations;
- Jason Budden, Senior VP of Marketing & Brand;
- Dan Forester, Senior VP of Player Development;
- Justin Roswell, VP, Tournament Division - Team One;
- Jim Gemler, Chief Program Officer;

== Factory Athletics Foundation ==
The Baseball Factory Team One Foundation (originally the B.A.S.E.-H.I.T. Foundation) was established alongside Baseball Factory in 1994, by current CEO Steve Sclafani.Factory Athletics Foundation promotes baseball & softball education and quality of life for children across America. It provides underprivileged children an opportunity to enhance their experiences through player development camps, national tournaments, showcases and college recruiting programs within Baseball & Softball Factory. In addition, the Foundation provides college scholarships to select candidates based on need.

Factory Foundation By The Numbers:

2,000+ Players awarded Baseball & Softball Factory scholarships or college scholarships

3,000+ Pounds of used equipment has been collected and donated to all corners of the world

$750,000+ of Support provided by Factory Foundation
