= Josef Ochs =

Josef Ochs (March 31, 1905, in Schmitten – November 12, 1987) was a German Police officer and SS-Obersturmführer. He was involved in the deportation of Sinti and Roma people. He was present in the Berlin Führerbunker during the last days of Hitler. Ochs left the bunker complex on May 1, 1945. During the postwar period he worked in the Federal Criminal Police Office (BKA) as head of the support group from 1951 to 1965. He was also the head of news-gathering.

== Early life ==
Josef Ochs was born in Schmitten on March 31, 1905. His parents (father named Taunus Schmitten) worked in lumber and wool farming. After completing High school in 1925, he studied Law and economics at the University of Frankfurt am Main, the Ludwig-Maximilians-Universität München, and the University of Erlangen. In 1933, he obtained his Ph.D. and began working in his father's factory until September 1936, in which he became a partner in a shoe trading company.

== Police career and the Nazi Party ==
In early October 1936 he began working in the police force, and passed his Commissioner exams in Frankfurt during July 1938 with "good" grades. He joined the Nazi Party in 1937 with membership number, 5927971. In February 1938, Ochs joined the Schutzstaffel (SS) with membership number, 290982. On July 2, 1938, he was promoted to SS-Obersturmführer. In September 1938, Ochs married the daughter of a pharmacist who was 13 years his junior. The couple had two children during the period of 1939 and 1943. At the end of 1938 he was transferred to Düsseldorf.

On January 15, 1939, he was appointed a detective with the Nazi Kriminalpolizei or Kripo. Later, from late 1939 to July 1941 he worked as an officer responsible for admissions to the Nazi concentration camps; including the Maideportation camp in Cologne. He was involved in the deportation of Sinti and Roma people. He was present in the Berlin Führerbunker during the last days of Hitler in April 1945. Ochs left the bunker complex on May 1, 1945.

== Post-war ==
After the surrender of Germany in May 1945, Ochs was sent to the detention center at Neuengamme, until the beginning of June 1945. During the postwar period he worked in the Federal Criminal Police Office (BKA) as head of the support group from 1951 to 1965. He was also the head of news-gathering.

== Sources ==
- Article on the German Wikipedia (German)
