= Farmersville, California =

City in California, United States

- City
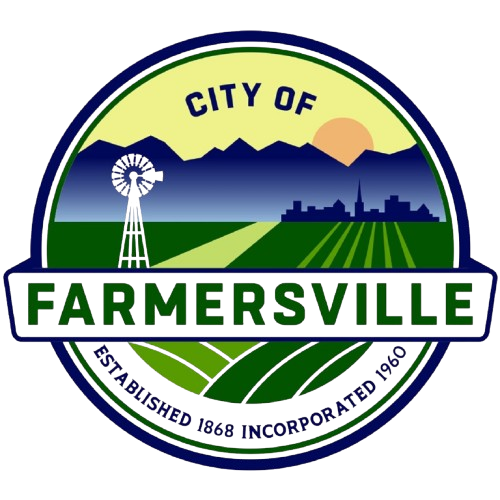
- Seal
- Motto: "Strong Roots...Growing Possibilities"
- Interactive map of Farmersville, California
- Location in California Location in the United States
- Coordinates: 36°18′4″N 119°12′27″W
- Country: United States
- State: California
- County: Tulare
- Incorporated: October 5, 1960

Government
  - Mayor: Paul Boyer

Area
  - City: 2.20 sq mi (5.70 km^{2})
  - Land: 2.20 sq mi (5.70 km^{2})
  - Water: 0 sq mi (0.00 km^{2}) 0%
- Elevation: 358 ft (109 m)

Population (2020)
  - City: 10,397
  - Estimate (2024): 10,501
  - Density: 4,720/sq mi (1,820/km^{2})
  - Metro: 473,117
- Time zone: UTC-8 (Pacific)
  - Summer (DST): UTC-7 (PDT)
- ZIP code: 93223
- Area code: 559
- FIPS code: 06-23616
- GNIS feature IDs: 1652709, 2410485
- Website: Official website

Farmersville is a city in Tulare County, California, United States. It is situated in the San Joaquin Valley near the foothills of the Sierra Nevada, just east of Visalia, California. The population was 10,397 at the 2020 census, down from 10,588 at the 2010 census.

The city hosts a number of annual events, including a Memorial Day Parade in May that draws around 4,000 visitors from the surrounding area, a Fall Festival held on the downtown boulevard each October, and a Christmas Tree Lighting event in December at the Old Methodist Church building. A little history on the Memorial Day Parade. It originated in 1954 after the completion of the Veteran's Memorial Building on E Front and N Magnolia. They wanted to celebrate the newly built building with a parade and a grand opening, no Grand Marshal or Queen is mentioned. The building was sold by its leadership in the 1970s.

== History ==
=== Early settlement ===
Founded in 1856, the community was originally called Deep Creek, located near the present-day Deep Creek Cemetery, where headstones date back to the 1850s. Farmersville's first school was built there to accommodate farm children in the area. In the Fly family history, preserved in a book written about their travels to California, there is mention of attending the Deep Creek School in the 1860s, which was located east of the cemetery.

Until 1863, residents living on the east side of the county traveled through Farmersville on the Visalia Road to collect their mail, purchase supplies, and sell their goods. Because the trip was long, many would stop at the Wiley Hinds farm, just south of present-day Farmersville, to sleep in his barn and continue home the next day. Wiley Hinds was a formerly enslaved man who came from Arkansas with his brother, Archibald, in 1858. He settled in Farmersville, purchased additional parcels for farming, and became very prosperous.

=== Early commercial development ===
In 1866 the Visalia Delta Newspaper reports of the new village being newly named "Farmersville". Having a respectable store, a doctor, drug store, blacksmith and bar. In this year entrepreneurs John Crowley and his brother-in-law Merrill Jasper opened the large general store in Farmersville to capture trade from residents on the east side of the county traveling to Visalia. The venture had limited success. In 1868, their nephew and store manager Thomas J. Brundage purchased the family business. During this period, the application for a post office and the town name were approved by the US government, and the store became much more successful as eastern residents began stopping to collect their mail.

Brundage also operated a lumber yard across the street from the general store, with oxen hauling lumber down from the Sierra hills. Just east of the Brundage General Store stood the Brown Hotel, constructed in 1870 for Edward Balaam and later purchased by Charles Brown. The two-story hotel served meals to passengers during horse changeovers for the Overland Stage; Brown also owned the adjacent livery stable. The site of the Brundage General Merchandise store and the Brown Hotel is near what is now Sam's Foods Supermarket (formerly Nickel's Payless), commemorated by a historic granite marker in the parking lot.

=== Destructive fire ===
A large fire in 1910 struck the corner of Visalia Road and Farmersville Boulevard, damaging the Brundage General Store, several other businesses, and scorching the Methodist Church. The old wooden store was later torn down and replaced with a Trading Post, which burned down in 1951 and was subsequently replaced by a Texaco station, later converted to a Beacon station. Today the site is an empty lot.

Also in 1910, Thomas J. Brundage's son Oscar G. Brundage, who had taken over the general store, completed construction of a brick store in December of that year. He continued operating it into the late 1920s. The brick building later became Dixon's Grocery Store, owned by Floyd Dixon, then Ryan's Grocery Store, and in the 1940s became a bar called the Frontier Club. It was destroyed by fire in the 1960s. It stood on the southeast corner of Visalia Road and Farmersville Boulevard, where Rainbow's Drive In stands today.

=== Move toward incorporation ===
In 1945, the town voted to fund its own police department, employing a single officer. Before 1960, the town was under county authority; residents and Chamber of Commerce officials worked with the county to address their needs. Discussion about incorporation began as early as 1945, when Don Freeman began the petition and application process.

On September 27, 1960, approximately 1,100 property owners voted on incorporating Farmersville. Of 448 votes cast, 70% were in favor. The vote also chose the five inaugural city councilors. The city was officially incorporated on October 5, 1960. The first city council comprised Mayor James Tornow, Truman Qualls, Don Freeman, Willis Freeman, and Jim Steven, with Carl Waddle serving as the first city clerk.

In its early years, the city struggled to provide adequate water delivery and wastewater treatment. In 1968, a loan of $480,000 was secured to build the first wastewater treatment plant and transmission infrastructure. That same year, some residents, led by store owner Tom Bray, seriously discussed disincorporation.

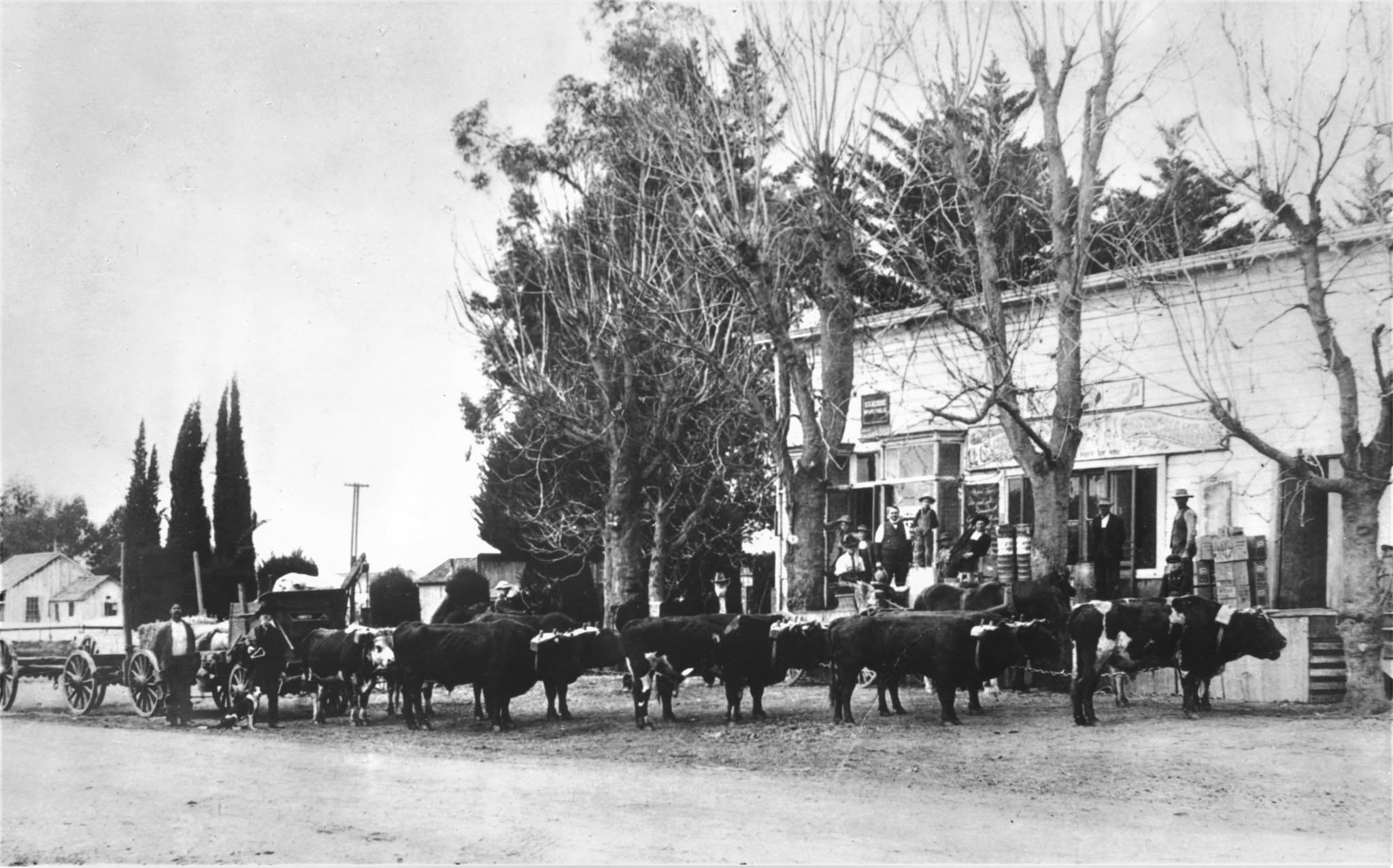

== Geography ==
Farmersville is located at 36°18′4″N 119°12′27″W (36.301169, −119.207603).

According to the United States Census Bureau, the city has a total area of 2.2 square miles (5.7 km^{2}), all land.

== Demographics ==
Historical population
Census	Pop.	Note	%±
1960	3,101		—
1970	3,456		11.4%
1980	5,544		60.4%
1990	6,235		12.5%
2000	8,737		40.1%
2010	10,588		21.2%
2020	10,397		−1.8%
2024 (est.)	10,501	▲	1.0%
U.S. Decennial Census

=== 2020 census ===
As of the 2020 census, Farmersville had a population of 10,397 and a population density of 4,723.8 inhabitants per square mile (1,823.9/km^{2}).

99.2% of residents lived in urban areas, while 0.8% lived in rural areas.

The entire population lived in households. There were 2,710 households, of which 56.7% had children under age 18. Of all households, 49.1% were married-couple households, 10.7% were cohabiting couple households, 14.7% were households with a male householder and no spouse or partner present, and 25.5% were households with a female householder and no spouse or partner present. About 10.4% of households were one person, and 5.3% were one person aged 65 or older. The average household size was 3.84. There were 2,308 families (85.2% of all households).

The age distribution was 32.6% under the age of 18, 11.1% aged 18 to 24, 26.6% aged 25 to 44, 20.5% aged 45 to 64, and 9.3% aged 65 or older. The median age was 29.4 years. For every 100 females, there were 98.1 males; for every 100 females aged 18 and over, there were 95.3 males.

There were 2,784 housing units at an average density of 1,264.9 units per square mile (488.4 units/km^{2}). Of the 2,710 occupied units (97.3%), 62.4% were owner-occupied and 37.6% were renter-occupied. 2.7% of housing units were vacant; the homeowner vacancy rate was 0.6% and the rental vacancy rate was 3.4%.

Racial composition as of the 2020 census
Race	Number	Percent
White	2,659	25.6%
Black or African American	44	0.4%
American Indian and Alaska Native	419	4.0%
Asian	58	0.6%
Native Hawaiian and Other Pacific Islander	0	0.0%
Some other race	5,445	52.4%
Two or more races	1,772	17.0%
Hispanic or Latino (of any race)	9,142	87.9%

=== 2023 estimates ===
In 2023, the US Census Bureau estimated that 24.3% of the population were foreign-born. Of all people aged 5 or older, 33.4% spoke only English at home, 66.4% spoke Spanish, 0.2% spoke other Indo-European languages, and 0.1% spoke Asian or Pacific Islander languages. Of those aged 25 or older, 58.4% were high school graduates and 4.6% had a bachelor's degree.

The median household income was $57,832, and the per capita income was $17,163. About 21.2% of families and 24.2% of the population were below the poverty line.

=== 2010 census ===
The 2010 United States Census reported that Farmersville had a population of 10,588. The population density was 4,688.2 inhabitants per square mile. The racial makeup of Farmersville was 5,295 (50.0%) White, 60 (0.6%) African American, 213 (2.0%) Native American, 72 (0.7%) Asian, 5 (0.0%) Pacific Islander, 4,494 (42.4%) from other races, and 449 (4.2%) from two or more races. Hispanic or Latino of any race were 8,876 persons (83.8%).

There were 2,595 households, of which 1,639 (63.2%) had children under the age of 18 living in them, 1,474 (56.8%) were married couples living together, 515 (19.8%) had a female householder with no husband present, and 274 (10.6%) had a male householder with no wife present. There were 257 (9.9%) unmarried partnerships and 10 (0.4%) same-sex couples. 258 households (9.9%) were made up of individuals, and 110 (4.2%) had someone living alone who was 65 years of age or older. The average household size was 4.08. There were 2,263 families (87.2% of all households).

The population was spread out, with 3,895 people (36.8%) under the age of 18, 1,234 people (11.7%) aged 18 to 24, 2,941 people (27.8%) aged 25 to 44, 1,822 people (17.2%) aged 45 to 64, and 696 people (6.6%) who were 65 years of age or older. The median age was 26.2 years.

There were 2,726 housing units at an average density of 1,207.0 per square mile, of which 1,590 (61.3%) were owner-occupied and 1,005 (38.7%) were occupied by renters. The homeowner vacancy rate was 2.5%; the rental vacancy rate was 4.2%. 6,537 people (61.7% of the population) lived in owner-occupied housing units and 4,051 people (38.3%) lived in rental housing units.

== Government ==
=== Local government ===
Mayor Paul Boyer is a retired development program director of Self Help Enterprises. Vice Mayor Danny Valdovinos is an owner of a local gym. Councilmember Tina Hernandez, who was the first female 2 term Mayor from 2022-2026. She is a Realtor with the California Department of Real Estate. Councilmember Araceli Ochoa, the previous Vice Mayor, is a Community Care Worker. Councilmember Gregorio Gomez is a systems administrator for the Tulare County Information and Communications Technology Department.

=== State and federal representation ===
In the Tulare County Board of Supervisors, Farmersville is in the 1st district, represented by Larry Micari.

In the California State Legislature, Farmersville is in the 16th senatorial district, represented by Democrat Melissa Hurtado, and in the 33rd Assembly district, represented by Republican Alexandra Macedo.

In the United States House of Representatives, Farmersville is in California's 21st congressional district, represented by Democrat Jim Costa.

== Education ==
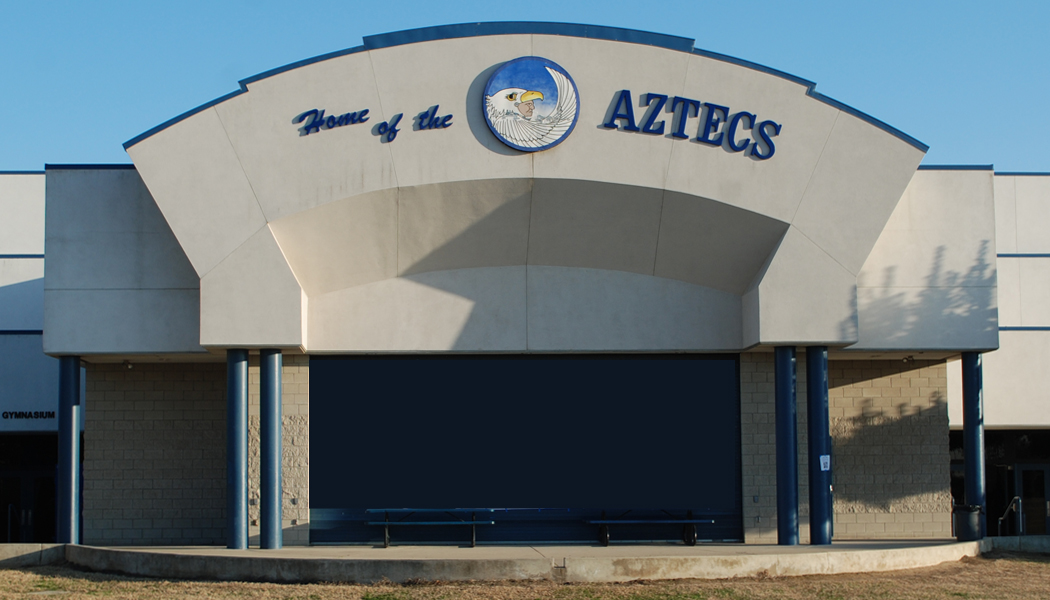
Farmersville High School

Farmersville has a single unified school district comprising Farmersville High School (the Aztecs), a middle school, and three elementary schools. J.E. Hester School serves kindergartners and first graders; George L. Snowden serves second and third graders; Freedom School serves fourth, fifth, and sixth graders. The junior high school serves seventh and eighth graders, and Farmersville High School covers ninth through twelfth grade.

The first school mentioned in historical records was located near the Deep Creek Cemetery, constructed of logs sometime in the 1860s. A second school was built around 1869–1904 by the Farmers Alliance Organization. It was a two-story building with classrooms on the second floor and a community room on the first floor for meetings and social events, located on the southwest corner of Visalia Road and Farmersville Boulevard. It was later replaced by a larger building, Farmersville Elementary School, which served from 1905 to 1952. Snowden Elementary replaced it in 1953. Hester School had opened earlier in 1950, and both schools were formally dedicated in 1953. Teacher and later school superintendent George L. Snowden played a major role in the decision-making process for the construction of Hester and Snowden schools. Current school board trustees are John Alvarez, Alice Lopez, Sabrina Gomez, Sijifredo Espinoza, and Merced Zamora.

== Church building history ==
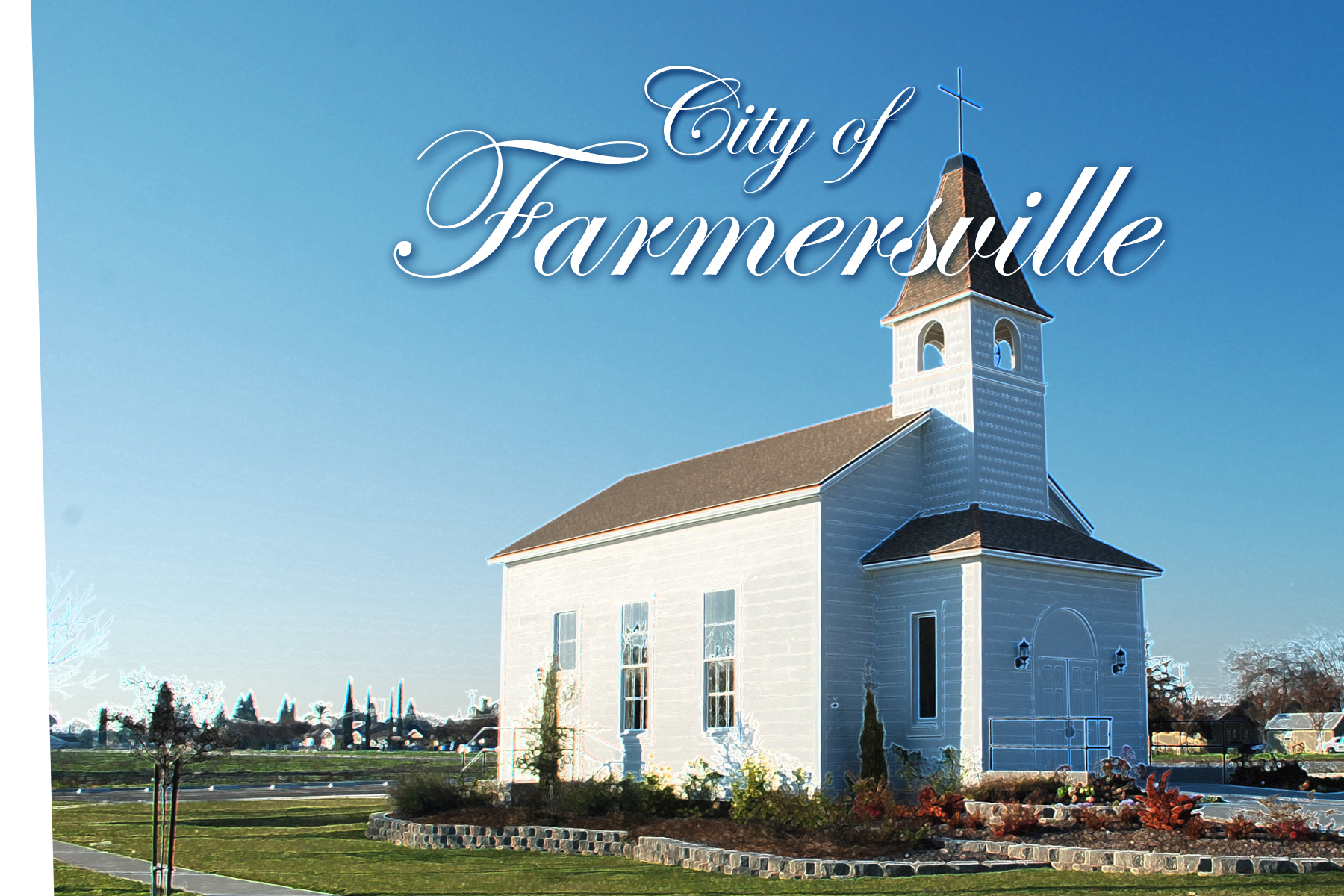
The church/museum is located at 881 N. Farmersville Boulevard

The building formerly serving as Farmersville Methodist Church was originally built in the 1870s in Goshen, California. After little usage there, the Visalia Methodist congregation purchased the church with the help of Farmersville church members in 1899–1900. The chapel was transported to Farmersville on logs pulled by horses. It was established on South Farmersville Boulevard just south of Visalia Road, also known as the "Four Corners." The founders of the early Farmersville Methodist Church were Thomas J. Brundage, a Mr. Sims, and Rev. G. E. Foster.

Around 1947, a need for more parking led to a search for a new location, resolved when Mrs. Avery donated a parcel of land at Avery Avenue and Ash Street. During the move, the steeple broke and was rebuilt using fishtail shingles. In later years it became the Farmersville United Methodist Church, continuing until March 2004. The Boys and Girls Club took over the building for a couple of years. In 2009 it was moved to its current location at N. Farmersville Boulevard and W. Front Street.

== Commerce ==
Farmersville serves occasionally as a commuter town, with many residents traveling to nearby communities for employment. Local commerce is composed primarily of small, family-owned businesses.

== Notable people ==
- Orval Overall, winning pitcher of the Chicago Cubs' final game of the 1908 World Series, was born in Farmersville.
- Russ Taff, southern gospel and pop singer, was born in Farmersville.
- Brian T. Carroll, teacher and presidential candidate with the American Solidarity Party.
