= Tri-County Athletic Conference =

High school athletic league

The TCAC is a high school athletic league that is part of the CIF Central Section.

The TCAC made its debut in 2022, members included are Central Valley Christian, Exeter, Hanford West, Immanuel Christian, Kerman, Kingsburg, Reedley, Selma, Sierra Pacific and Washington Union

The TCAC is split into two leagues, each with 5 schools, Kings Canyon League and Sequoia League.

== Members ==
- Central Valley Christian High School
- Immanuel High School
- Kerman High School
- Kingsburg High School
- Exeter Union High School
- Reedley High School
- Selma High School
- Sierra Pacific High School
- Hanford West High School
- Washington Union High School
