= Orosi High School =

Location
- 41815 Rd. 128; Orosi, California 93647; United States; 36.54831°N 119.28733°W

Information
- Type: Public
- Motto: Dream big, Work hard, Give back
- Established: 1909
- Principal: Oscar Villaseñor
- Teaching staff: 53.74 (FTE)
- Grades: 9 - 12
- Enrollment: 1,084 (2023-2024)
- Student to teacher ratio: 20.17
- Color
- Mascot: Cardinal
- California Distinguished School: 1990
- Website: https://ohs.cojusd.org/

Orosi High School is a public high school in Orosi, California, in the Cutler-Orosi Joint Unified School District.

The district (of which this is the sole comprehensive high school) includes Orosi, Cutler, East Orosi, Hartland, and Yettem.

== History ==
The Orosi High School District was organized in 1909 by Frances E. Snell. Grammar and high school classes were held in the same building, with high school occupying the upstairs portion and one downstairs room. The first class was made up of twenty-nine freshmen, two sophomores, and one junior. Frances Snell taught mathematics, history, and English while Louise Duncan was in charge of the commercial department and Latin. By 1911, the high school was distinct from the grammar school, but remained in the same building.

In 1912, Orosi High School's first class graduated. Two students made up the graduating class. That same year, a new site for the school was purchased on Road 128 (formerly Palm Avenue). Temporary buildings were put up to accommodate the students.

The main structure was of the old California style with boards running up and down. The front of the building was an assembly room with an office adjoining and four classrooms toward the back. Small utility buildings were in the back. One of these had a loft which was a great attraction for the boys.

In the 1914–1915 academic year, the school welcomed 15 new students and graduated 7 seniors.

In 1917 a combination brick and stucco schoolhouse was built with seven classrooms, assembly hall, administrative office and faculty room. A brick gymnasium of brick and a frame shop building were added in 1922. The homemaking department had a wing to itself. A south wing was added in 1937, and remains after other old buildings burned or were demolished to be replaced by new ones in 1956. The school suffered a destructive fire in 1942. Bonds and state support provided funds for new classrooms and a new gymnasium, which was ready in 1951. The other new buildings were occupied in 1954. In 1955 the administration of both the elementary and high schools was placed under one superintendent, each retaining its own principal.

In 1962, a new building was built, which housed a library, science laboratory, and additional classrooms.

In 1965, the district unified and the high school students from Badger were included in the district.

A football stadium was built for the school in 1972.

In 1990, Orosi High School was awarded the California Distinguished School recognition.

In 2007, Cutler-Orosi was one of the communities to receive the U.S. Department of Justice "weed and seed" grants and in 2010, it underwent a remodeling, which included adding new classrooms and an amphitheater and redesigning the student quad area.

The class of 2012 was the school's 100th graduating class. The class saw their highest number of students going into higher education and the UC system, with eight valedictorians.

In 2015, was named a Gold Ribbon School by the California Department of Education.

In 2017, a new science building was added to the school featuring 8 new classrooms and new restrooms.

In October 2018, Orosi High School received a new stadium. The stadium is able to accommodate 3,200 people. A nine-synthetic track was added around the football field. A new bathroom and concession stand were added the visitor's side.

In 2025, A new performing arts building was added. It features a new band and choir room, individual practice rooms, storage areas, dressing rooms, and teacher offices.

An aquatics complex was opened in 2025 as well. The complex features a community pool, a 25 by 38 meter competition pool with bleachers on both ends, changing rooms, lockers, and coach offices.

== Education and community ==
Orosi High School has faced struggles as a small school in an unincorporated community. Its student population is largely low-income, many of whom deal with poverty and do not expect to pursue higher education. With youth-focused efforts from the school and community, Orosi has sought to decrease gang violence and juvenile crime through providing a stronger foundation for the betterment of education and social services. Without an incorporated city department, the school district takes a leadership role in a lot of initiatives in the community, using OHS as a central location. In 2007, Cutler-Orosi was one of the communities to receive the U.S. Department of Justice "weed and seed" grants which enabled funds to be put towards anti-gang programs, graffiti abatement, the opening of "safe haven" after-school sites by the Cutler-Orosi Joint Unified School District.

After the 2010 remodeling, spare trailers formerly used as classrooms were available to be used as a StepUp program location after receiving a service learning grant in 2011. It has since been able to provide many more alternative activities for students after-school.

With the addition of an AVID program, and grassroots support from parents and community, OHS has turned its focus on college preparation and developing working skills in its students. OHS has consistently been a National Demonstration School for AVID.

The Academy of Engineering and Green Technology was added in 2013 and the Academy of Health Sciences in 2014. Future projects hope for the addition of a third academy: the Academy of Sustainable Agriculture.

Orosi High School's campus is also a site for College of Sequoias course programs.
