= Orange Cove High School =

Location
- 1700 South Anchor Avenue; Orange Cove, California 93646; United States; 36.6168°N 119.32209°W

Information
- School type: Public
- Established: 2004
- School district: Kings Canyon Unified School District
- Principal: Amanda Lopez Doerksen
- Faculty: 30.75 (on FTE basis)
- Grades: 9-12
- Enrollment: 631 (2023-2024)
- Student to teacher ratio: 20.52
- Colors: Green and White
- Athletics conference: CIF-CS
- Mascot: Titan
- Website: Orange Cove High School

Orange Cove HIgh School is a public high school serving students grades 9–12 located in Orange Cove, California, in the Central Valley of California in the United States. It is one of the three high schools operated by the Kings Canyon Unified School District. It is zoned to the city and surrounding communities of Orange Cove, including unincorporated communities within immediately surrounding Fresno County as of 2010. Students participate in the CIF Central Section. In 2023, the school received a mixed ratings from the California Department of Education.

== History ==
In 1988, the city had endorsed the proposal to secede from the KCUSD create a new school district and proper high school for Orange Grove and surrounding communities.

In 1997, a proposal to pass a bond to build a high school for Orange Grove and perform other general improvements for the district narrowly failed to pass.

In 2001, a bond proposal was made that would build a high school for Orange Grove, a school in Dunlap, and other improvements. The Fresno Bee notes that this would be the 11th attempt to pass a bond of its type since the 1960s. By this point, Reedley High School was addressing overcrowding issues with portable buildings. The cost to construct the school was $32 million when a March 2002 bond to build the new school passed after prior proposals had failed.

Construction for the high school began in March 2004.

Orange Cove High School first opened in 2004 was the first high located in Orange Cove. Before its construction, students had to travel to Reedley High School located in Reedley, nearly eight miles from Orange Cove.

== Athletics ==
The Orange Cove Titans participate in the following sports:

- Baseball
- Basketball
- Cross country
- Football
- Soccer
- Softball
- Tennis
- Track
- Volleyball
- Wrestling

=== Championships ===
The school's football team won the 2007 East Sierra League football championship.
