= CIF Central Section =

Association of central California high school athletic conferences

- Abbreviation: CIF-CS
- Type: NPO
- Legal status: Association
- Purpose: Athletic/educational
- Headquarters: Fresno, California
- Region served: San Joaquin Valley; Eastern Sierra; San Luis Obispo County, northern Santa Barbara County
- Affiliations: California Interscholastic Federation

The California Interscholastic Federation—Central Section (CIF-CS) is the governing body of high school athletics in the central and southern portions of the San Joaquin Valley, the Eastern Sierra region, and as of the 2018/9 season, San Luis Obispo County and northern Santa Barbara County on the Central Coast. It is one of ten sections that are comprised by the California Interscholastic Federation (CIF). As of the 2020–21 academic year, the Central Section consists of 18 athletic leagues.

== Leagues and schools ==
- Central Coast Athletic Association
- County Metro Athletic Conference
- East Sequoia League
- East Sierra League
- East Yosemite League
- Hi-Lo League
- High Desert League
- West Sequoia League
- North Yosemite League
- South Sequoia League
- South Yosemite Horizon League
- South Yosemite Mountain League
- South Yosemite River League
- South Yosemite Valley League
- Tri-County Athletic Conference
- Tri-River Athletic Conference
- West Sierra League
- West Yosemite League
