= Ivo Boscarol =

Slovenian light aircraft designer

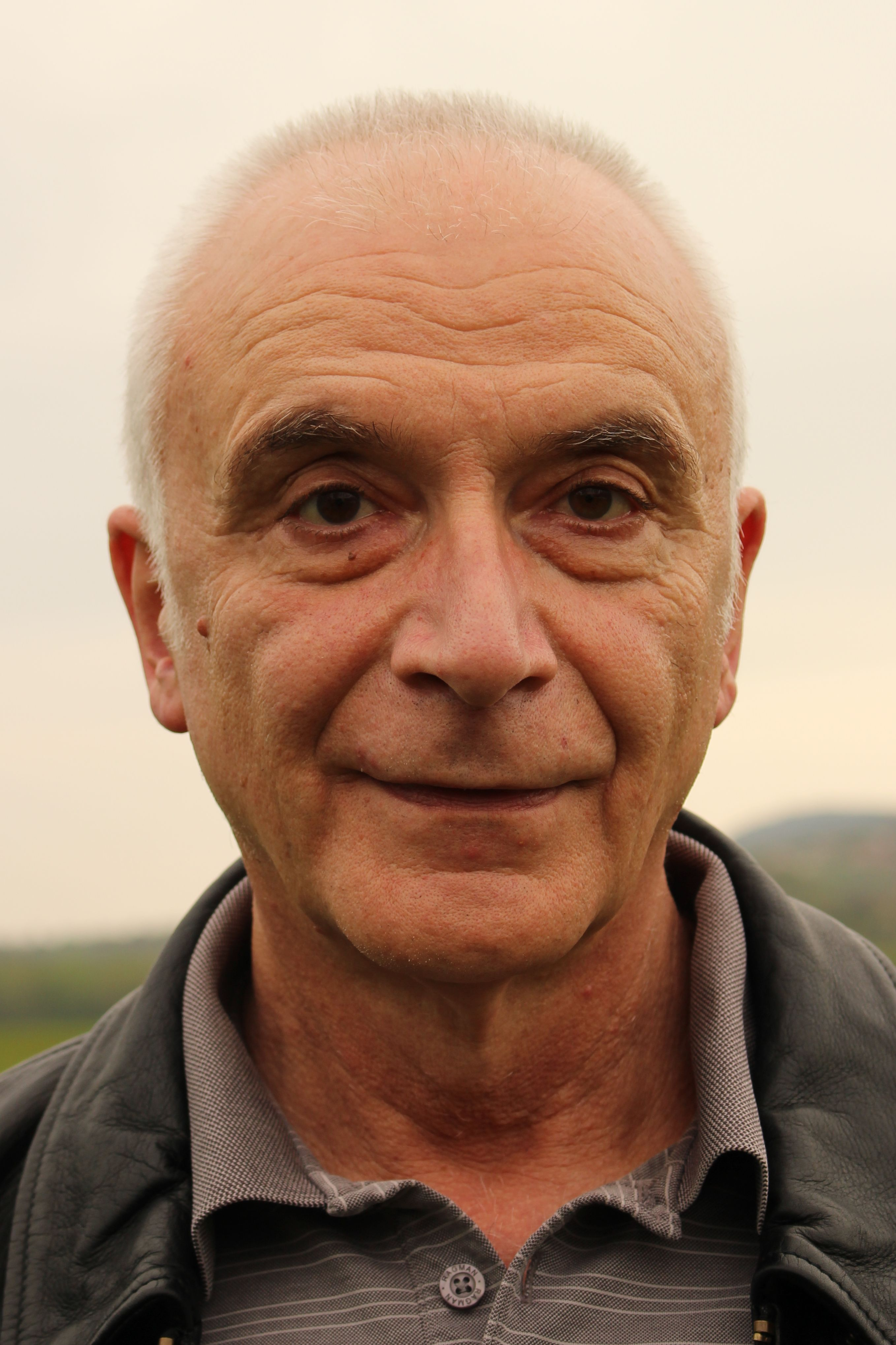
- Born: 15 April 1956 (age 70); Postojna, Slovenia
- Occupation: CEO of Pipistrel
- Years active: 1976–present
- Children: Taja Boscarol

Ivo Boscarol (Slovene: [ˈiːʋɔ]; Italian: [boskaˈrɔl]), born 15 April 1956, is the founder of Pipistrel, a producer of ultralight and light aircraft, based in Ajdovščina, Slovenia. Boscarol is most known as an aircraft designer and entrepreneur.

== Early career ==
Boscarol was born in 1956 in Postojna, Slovenia, at the time also part of Yugoslavia. His father Augusto Boscarol, a machine engineer, spent several young years as a test pilot at the Aermacchi, an Italian aircraft manufacturer. Family lived in Ajdovščina, a town in western Slovenia near which a small military airfield was located. After elementary and high school in Ajdovščina Boscarol studied economy at the University of Ljubljana. From 1976 to 1986 he was involved in publishing, owned a studio, in photography (official photographer at the Šentjakobsko gledališče theatre in Ljubljana 1976–1980), was an advertising manager of the student radio station in Ljubljana (1976–1978), a manager of several musicians and rock bands. Boscarol also organized several art photo exhibitions, including nudes.

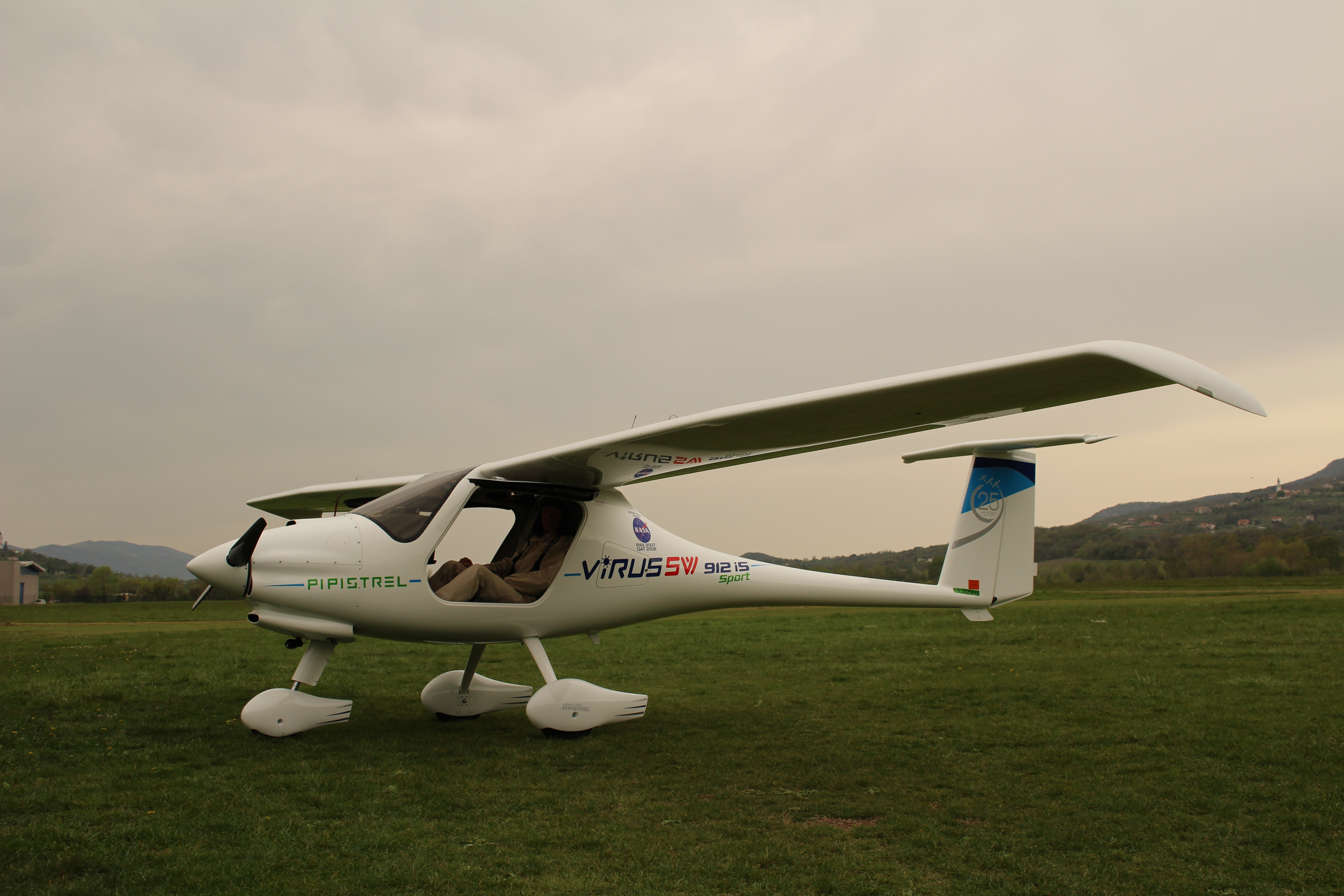
Pipistrel Virus SW 912 IS ultra-light airplane

== Pipistrel ==
In the eighties of the past century the era of hang gliding and powered hang gliding arrived and Boscarol, though flying private aircraft of any kind was not legal, started an own private business, Boscarol studio, a small-scale production of motorized hang gliders, mainly for customers in the neighboring Italy. He had to test his prototypes, first hang gliders, later ultra-lightairplanes, and to avoid too much attention he flew between dusk and darkness. The flying times and shape of the wings earned the aircraft the nickname "pipistrel", a word locals use in dialect for bat. It is derived from Italian pipistrello.

Boscarol used the word to name his new company, Pipistrel. After a struggling first decade the markets began to open up following the exhibition of Pipistrel Sinus ultra-light aircraft at the 1995 AERO Friedrichshafen European general aviation trade show. Commitment to light designs and fuel efficiency, possible especially in the category of motor gliders paved the way to wide recognition of the company and his ideas.

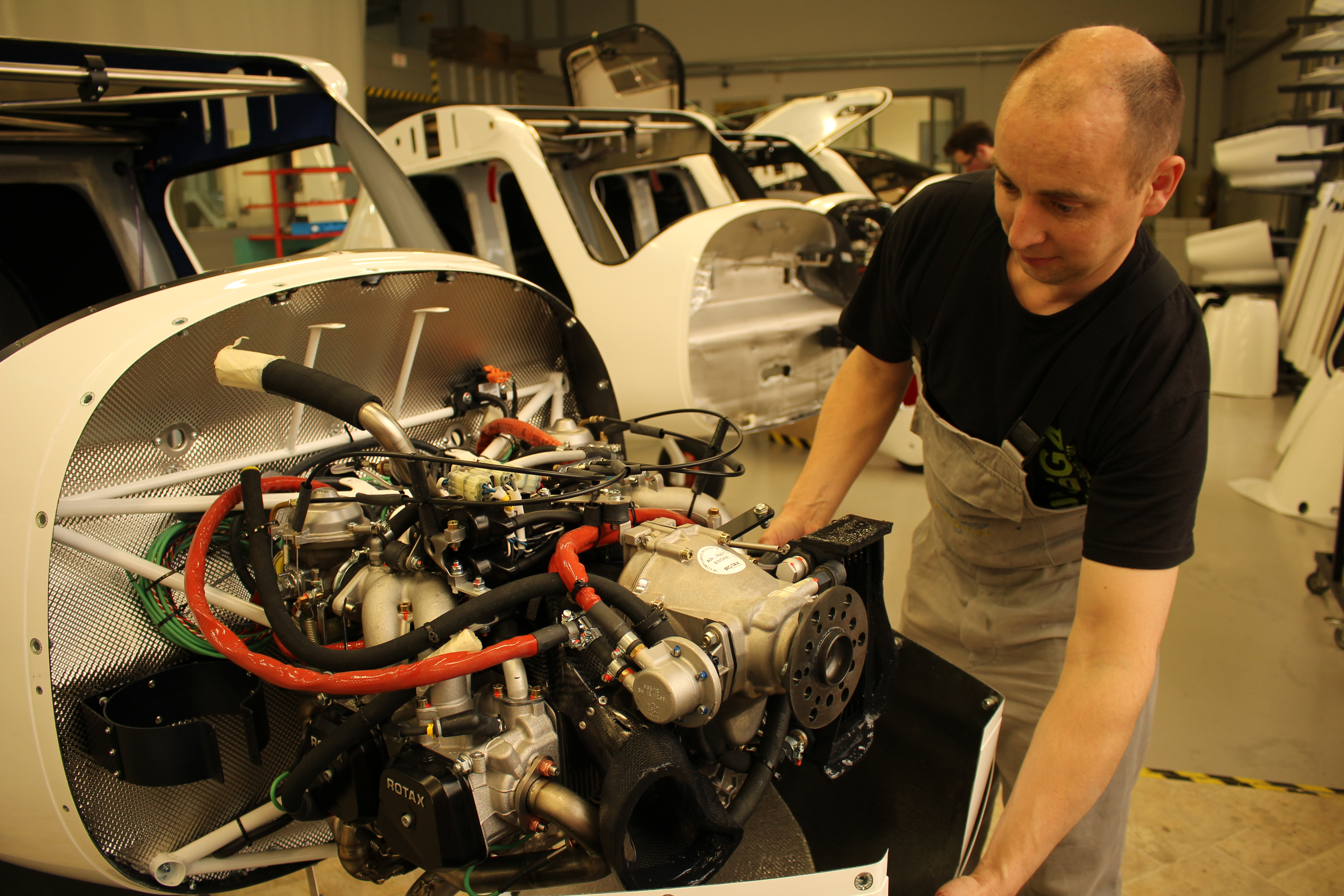
Assembled engine on a light-sport aircraft in the Pipistrel Ajdovščina factory

Most visible was the successful participation at several NASA Centennial Challenges, prize contests aimed at engaging the public at large to help advance the aeronautic and space technologies. It began with the 2007 NASA Personal Air Vehicle (PAV) Challenge competition (Pipistrel Virus) and was followed in 2008, when the event was renamed to NASA General Aviation Technology Challenge (GAT).

The most important of all was the participation at the Google-sponsored 2011 NASA Green Flight Challenge (GFC) competition with a $1,350.000 main prize, the largest in aviation history. Competition rules asked for an aviation breakthrough. The competing aircraft were required to fly 200 miles (320 km) in less than two hours; reach an average speed of at least 100 mph (160 km/h); take off at a distance of less than 2,000 feet (610 m) to clear a 50-foot (15 m) obstacle; deliver a decibel rating of less than 78 dBA at full-power takeoff while using less than one US gallon (3.8 L) of gasoline per occupant.

10 planes entered the competition, 3 of them actually flew and only 2 met the above requirements. The contest-winning Taurus G4 electric plane was of an unconventional design, with two fuselages and a large (200 horsepower or 150 kW) motor in between. Such a design was required to accommodate the over 75 kilowatt-hours (270 MJ) of lithium-ion polymer batteries, nearly half the weight of a 2,350-pound (1,070 kg) plane. The development of this aircraft, led by Tine Tomazic, 5 months from concept to production was achieved using high performance computing (HPC) technologies including computational fluid dynamics. It won the 2014 HPC Innovation Excellence Award.

== Awards ==
Boscarol has received several awards for his work. In 2003, he received the Entrepreneur of the Year award by the Podjetnik (Entrepreneur) journal, and the Fifth of May Award by the Municipality of Ajdovščina. In 2004, he received the Paul Tissandier Diploma by the FIA for his exceptional contribution to the development of aviation. In 2005 he received the award for exceptional business and entrepreneurship achievements by the Chamber of Commerce and Industry of Slovenia. In 2011, he was proclaimed the Person of the Year by the Delo newspaper and the then President of Slovenia Danilo Türk awarded him the Golden Order for Merits. In 2023, he was bestowed the lifetime achievement award by the Manager Association, the professional association of Slovenian managers.
