= Pipistrel WATTsUP =

Electric trainer aircraft built by Pipistrel

WATTsUP

General information
- Type: Ultralight civil utility aircraft
- National origin: Slovenia
- Manufacturer: Pipistrel
- Number built: 1

History
- First flight: 12 August 2014
- Developed from: Pipistrel Sinus and Pipistrel Virus
- Developed into: Pipistrel Alpha Electro

The Pipistrel WATTsUP is an electric aircraft proof-of-concept trainer design that was built in Slovenia by Pipistrel.

The aircraft is based upon the Pipistrel Alpha Trainer, which was itself related to the Pipistrel Sinus and Virus designs. The WATTsUP was first publicly shown at the Salon de Blois airshow, in France on 30 August 2014.

The proof of concept resulted in the Pipistrel Alpha Electro production aircraft.

== Design and development ==
The WATTsUP is a high-wing, cantilever monoplane of pod-and-boom configuration with a T-tail. The cabin has two seats in side-by-side configuration. The WATTsUP is powered by an 85 kW (114.0 hp) electric motor developed by Siemens AG, that weighs just 14 kg (31 lb). The initial climb rate is over 5.1 m/s (1,000 ft/min).

The manufacturer claims the electric motor produces more power than a Rotax 912 and can be fully charged in about one hour. The airplane is expected to be capable of flying for about one hour with a 30-minute reserve and it is most efficient in the traffic pattern where as much as 13 percent of the energy is recuperated during each approach.

The initial base price is intended to be less than 100,000 Euros.

== Specifications (WATTsUP) ==
Data from AVweb and Manufacturer

General characteristics

- Crew: one
- Capacity: one passenger
- Length: 6.5 m (21 ft 4 in)
- Wingspan: 10.5 m (34 ft 5 in)
- Wing area: 9.51 m^{2} (102.4 sq ft)
- Aspect ratio: 11.3:1
- Empty weight: 314 kg (692 lb) with batteries
- Gross weight: 550 kg (1,213 lb)
- Powerplant: 1 × Siemens AG electric motor, 50 kW (67 hp)
- Propellers: 2-bladed fixed pitch wooden propeller, 1.80 m (5 ft 11 in) diameter

Performance

- Maximum speed: 194 km/h (121 mph, 105 kn)
- Cruise speed: 157 km/h (98 mph, 85 kn)
- Stall speed: 69 km/h (43 mph, 37 kn) flaps down
- Never exceed speed: 250 km/h (155 mph, 135 kn)
- Range: 150 km (93 mi, 81 nmi)
- Endurance: 1.5 hrs
- Service ceiling: 4,900 m (16,000 ft)
- g limits: +4/-2
- Maximum glide ratio: 15:1
- Rate of climb: 6.1 m/s (1,200 ft/min)

== See also ==
- Aero Electric Sun Flyer
- Liaoning Ruixiang RX1E
