= Pipistrel Twister =

Slovenian ultralight trike

Twister

General information
- Type: Ultralight trike
- National origin: Slovenia
- Manufacturer: Pipistrel
- Status: Production completed (2018)

History
- Developed from: Flight Team Spider

The Pipistrel Twister is a Slovenian ultralight trike, designed and produced by Pipistrel of Ajdovščina. It was distributed in Europe by Flight Team UG & Company AG of Ippesheim and sometimes called the Flight Team Twister. The aircraft is supplied as a complete ready-to-fly-aircraft.

By October 2018 it was listed as a "legacy" product and production had ended.

== Design and development ==
The Twister is a development of the Pipistrel Spider. It incorporates a bent main pylon, which allows more seating room for the rear seat occupant, more streamlined main landing gear legs and a Rotax 912 engine. The Twister was designed for competition use, but has been successful in the recreational market as well.

The Twister was designed to comply with the Fédération Aéronautique Internationale microlight category, including the category's maximum gross weight of 450 kg (992 lb). It features a cable-braced hang glider-style high-wing, weight-shift controls, a two-seats-in-tandem open cockpit with a cockpit fairing, tricycle landing gear with wheel pants and a single engine in pusher configuration.

The aircraft is made from welded steel tubing, with its double surface wing covered in Dacron sailcloth. Its 10 m (32.8 ft) span wing is supported by a single tube-type kingpost and uses an "A" frame weight-shift control bar. The powerplant is a four-cylinder, air and liquid-cooled, four-stroke, dual-ignition 80 hp (60 kW) Rotax 912UL engine.

The aircraft has an empty weight of 198 kg (437 lb) and a gross weight of 450 kg (992 lb), giving a useful load of 252 kg (556 lb). With full fuel of 42 litres (9.2 imp gal; 11 US gal) the payload is 222 kg (489 lb).

== Specifications (Twister 912) ==
Data from Bayerl

General characteristics

- Crew: one
- Capacity: one passenger
- Wingspan: 10 m (32 ft 10 in)
- Wing area: 15 m^{2} (160 sq ft)
- Empty weight: 198 kg (437 lb)
- Gross weight: 450 kg (992 lb)
- Fuel capacity: 42 litres (9.2 imp gal; 11 US gal)
- Powerplant: 1 × Rotax 912UL four cylinder, liquid and air-cooled, four stroke aircraft engine, 60 kW (80 hp)
- Propellers: 3-bladed composite

Performance

- Maximum speed: 130 km/h (81 mph, 70 kn)
- Cruise speed: 110 km/h (68 mph, 59 kn)
- Stall speed: 60 km/h (37 mph, 32 kn)
- Rate of climb: 9 m/s (1,800 ft/min)
- Wing loading: 30.0 kg/m^{2} (6.1 lb/sq ft)

== See also ==
- Silence Twister, a different aircraft with the same model name
