= Pipistrel Panthera =

Slovenian light aircraft

Panthera
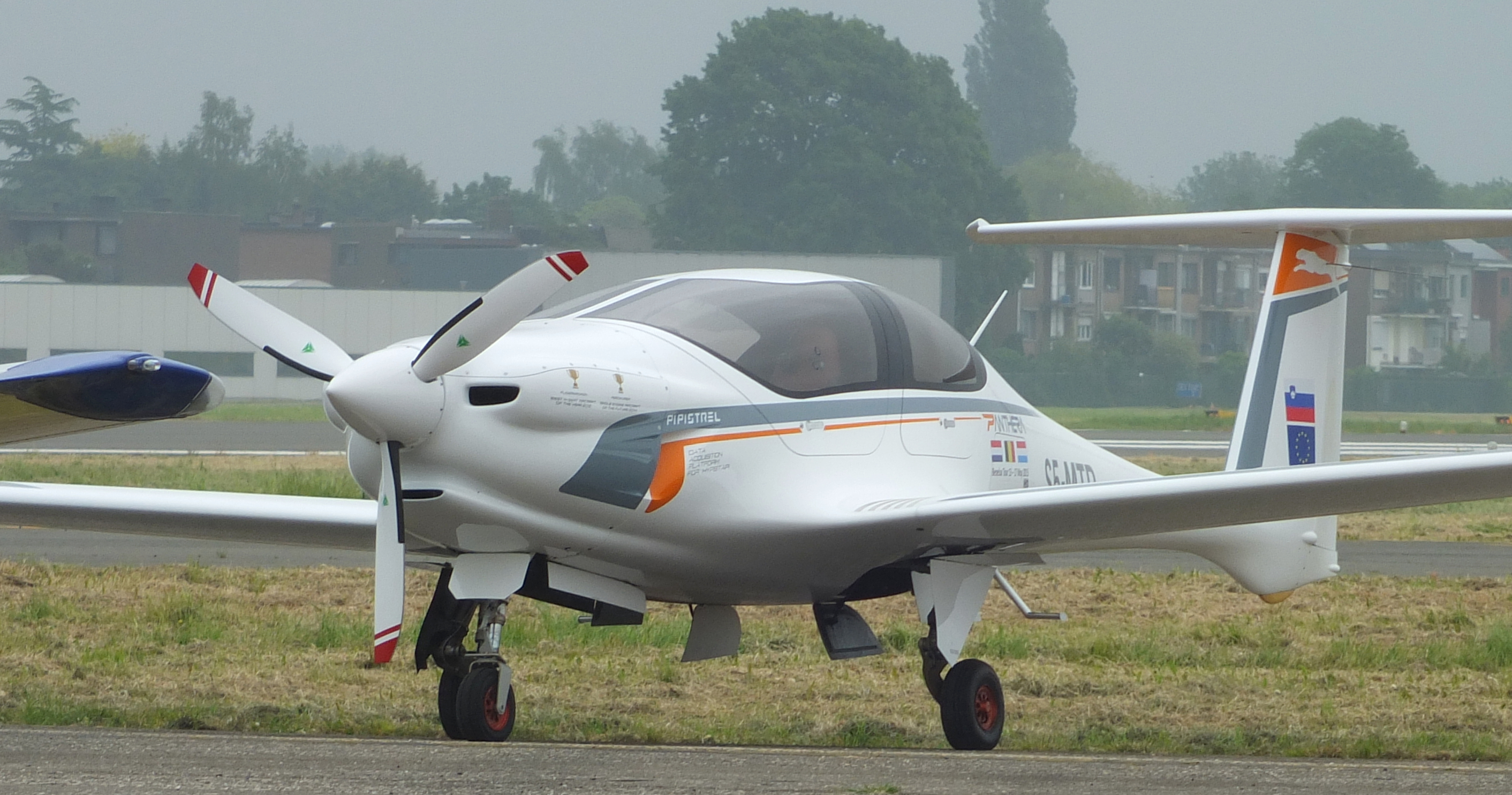

General information
- Type: Light aircraft
- National origin: Slovenia
- Manufacturer: Pipistrel
- Status: In production

History
- Introduction date: 2013 Part 23 certification anticipated for in 2022
- First flight: April 4, 2013

The Pipistrel Panthera is a lightweight, all-composite, highly efficient four-seat aircraft under development by Pipistrel of Slovenia.

The petrol-powered version of the Panthera is intended to cruise at 198 KTAS (366.7 km/h) at 8,000 feet for up to 1,500 nmi (2'750 km) using a Lycoming IO-540 engine burning AvGas. There are two other versions planned, one with a 145 kW hybrid-electric power system, and the other with a 145 kW pure electric system. These two latter variants will only seat two people to accommodate the electric systems.

The company is offering the Panthera as an experimental aircraft, either factory-built or as a kit for amateur construction, with the type certified variant expected in 2022.

== Development ==
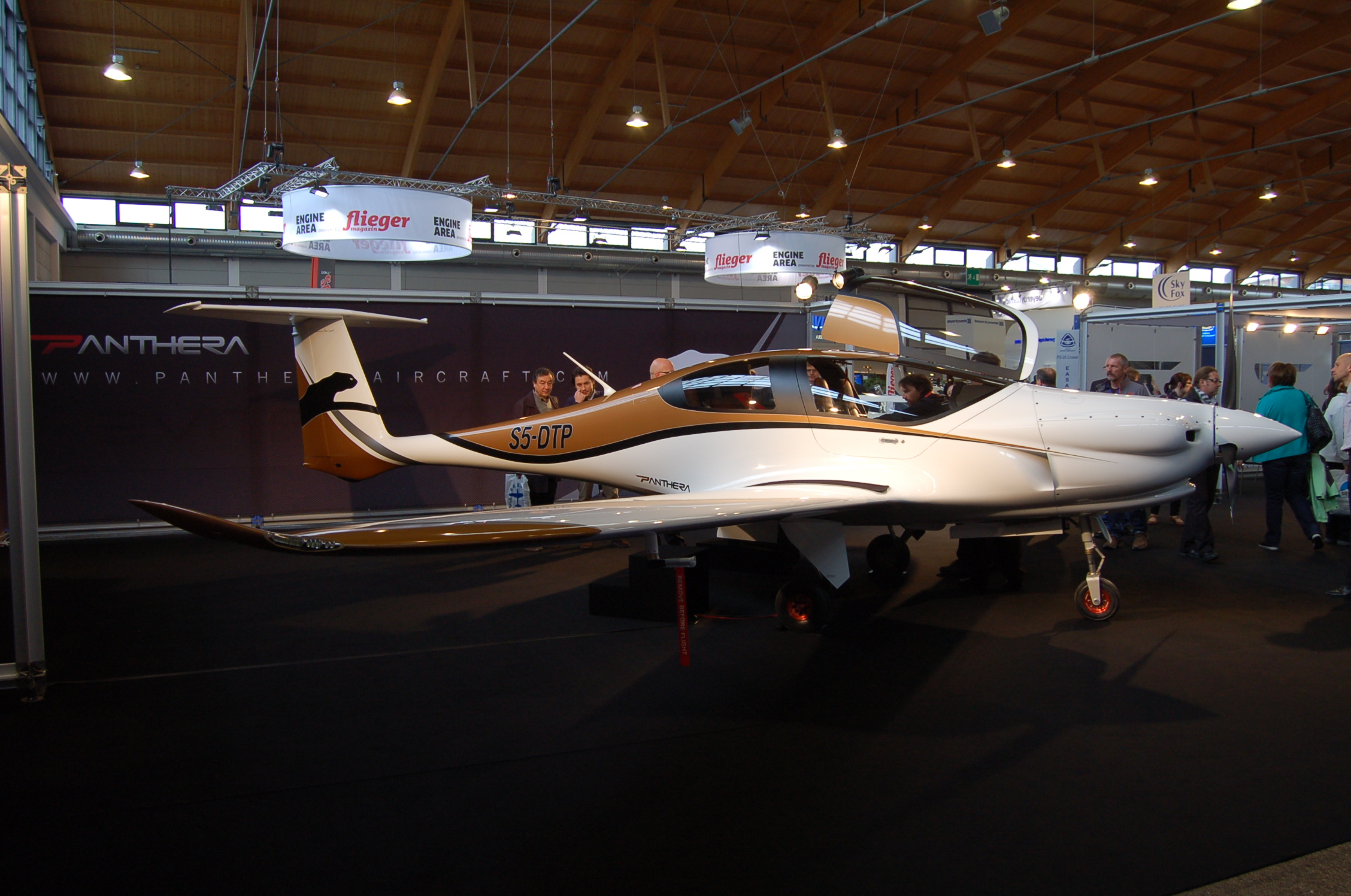
Pipistrel Panthera public presentation at AERO Friedrichshafen 2012

In May 2011, Pipistrel was working on constructing the prototype, powered by the Lycoming engine, with all of the aircraft molds already completed. The first flight was planned for autumn of the same year, with the aircraft being tested the following summer with the electric technologies derived from the Green Flight Challenge electric Taurus project. It should be initially offered in kit form, and Pipistrel indicated that construction will take place in Italy.

A test aircraft was presented at AERO Friedrichshafen 2012 in April 2012. On March 29, 2013, the Panthera had its first successful engine start, using a 210 hp (157 kW) Lycoming engine, and subsequently began taxi tests in preparation for the "complete flight test programme". The Pipistrel Panthera made its 54-minute maiden flight less than one week later on April 4, starting the evaluations of performance, handling and systems in flight. Less than one month later, the Panthera flew over the Alps to the Aero fair at the Friedrichshafen Airport.

In March 2014 it was announced that the intended four-cylinder Lycoming IO-390 powerplant will be replaced by a six-cylinder Lycoming IO-540. The change was made due to Lycoming Engines not planning to certify the IO-390 for automotive fuel as an option. The IO-540 will provide the same cruise performance and fuel economy, but it weighs 41 kg (90 lb) more. However, it will allow the Panthera's gross weight to be increased by 95.25 kg (210 lb) to make up for the extra weight. The aircraft will use the existing cowling, which was originally designed to accommodate a six-cylinder engine anyway.

The EU-funded the Hypstair program over three years till 2016: a Panthera mockup received a serial hybrid-electric powertrain, ground testing a 200-kW motor driven by batteries only, by a 100-kW generator-only and by both combined. It is followed by Mahepa project from 2017, EU-funded over four years. The Panthera drivetrain will be divided in modules: electric motor thrust generator and internal combustion power generator in the nose, human-machine interface and computing, fuel and batteries in the wing. Ground testing is planned for 2019 before flight tests in 2020. In October 2021, Pipistrel and the Mahepa consortium announced the hybrid-electric version of the Panthera has completed the first phase of its flight test program.

== Design ==
Features of the aircraft will include an airframe ballistic parachute designed for use at high speeds and low altitudes and a glass cockpit. The Pipistrel Panthera has an all-composite airframe, made from carbon fiber, glass fiber, and kevlar, and it sports trailing-link electrically retractible landing gear made of titanium and aluminum alloys, which will be of benefit for operations from grass runways. The composite materials used for the exterior of the aircraft were selected in part based on their ability to withstand lightning strikes, which merit increased consideration when employing composite materials instead of a traditional aluminum airframe.

== Variants ==
Panthera (IO-390)
Initial experimental variant powered by a Lycoming IO-390, 210 hp (160 kW) engine. 1 unit built.
Panthera (IO-540)
Experimental variant powered by a Lycoming IO-540, 260 hp (190 kW) engine.
Panthera Individual
Experimental homebuilt kit variant powered by a Lycoming IO-540 engine.
Panthera EASA TC
EASA CS-23 type-certified variant, powered by a Lycoming IO-540 engine. Launch expected in 2022.
Panthera Hybrid
Variant equipped with a hybrid-electric powertrain. In development.
Panthera Electro
Battery-powered fully electric variant. In development.

== Specifications ==
Data from manufacturer’s website

General characteristics

- Crew: one
- Capacity: three passengers
- Length: 8.07 m (26 ft 6 in)
- Wingspan: 10.86 m (35 ft 8 in)
- Height: 2.19 m (7 ft 2 in)
- Wing area: 11.2 m^{2} (121 sq ft)
- Empty weight: 815 kg (1,797 lb)
- Max takeoff weight: 1,315 kg (2,899 lb)
- Fuel capacity: 210 litres (46 imp gal; 55 US gal)
- Powerplant: 1 × Lycoming IO-540-V4A5 six cylinder piston aircraft engine, 190 kW (260 hp) Variants will include a hybrid system and a pure electric option, each 150 kW (201 hp) continuous power.
- Propellers: 3-bladed

Performance

- Cruise speed: 359 km/h (223 mph, 194 kn) at 75% power, FL080
- Stall speed: 102 km/h (63 mph, 55 kn) flaps extended
- Never exceed speed: 410 km/h (250 mph, 220 kn)
- Range: 2,800 km (1,700 mi, 1,500 nmi) at 190 KTAS, FL120, with 4 people aboard
- Service ceiling: 7,600 m (25,000 ft)
- Rate of climb: 6.6 m/s (1,300 ft/min) at MTOM and V_{Y}
- Fuel consumption:14.8 US gal (56 L) per hour

Avionics

- Garmin G3X GDU 460 dual 10-inch display PFD and MFD
- Garmin GMC 307 2-axis GPS-slaved digital autopilot
- Garmin GTN 750 Xi Com/Nav/IFR GPS
- Garmin GTX 345R Transponder

== See also ==
Aircraft of comparable role, configuration, and era

- Cessna 400
- Cirrus SR22
- Lancair IV
