= Flight Team =

German aircraft manufacturer

Flight Team UG & Co KG
- Company type: Privately held company
- Industry: Aerospace
- Products: Ultralight trikes
- Services: Distributor for Pipistrel aircraft and Galaxy Holdings sro ballistic parachutes
- Website: www.flight-team.de

Flight Team UG & Company KG (usually just Flight Team) is a German aircraft distributor based in Ippesheim, in the district of Neustadt (Aisch)-Bad Windsheim in Bavaria.

The company was the sole distributor for two trike carriages, the Spider and its competition development version, the Twister, which were designed and built by Pipistrel in Slovenia, although they were sometimes called the Flight Team Spider and Flight Team Twister. These were equipped with a range of wings, mostly provided by Air Creation of France, for which Flight Team was once the German distributor. The Spider was introduced in 1992, but both the Spider and Twister were out of production by 2013 and no longer listed on the company website.

The Spider and Twister carriages were noted for their TIG-welded steel construction with fibreglass mainwheel suspension.

The company is a distributor for Pipistrel aircraft and Galaxy Holdings sro ballistic parachutes.
