= DLR HY4 =

Hydrogen-powered aircraft type HY4

HY4
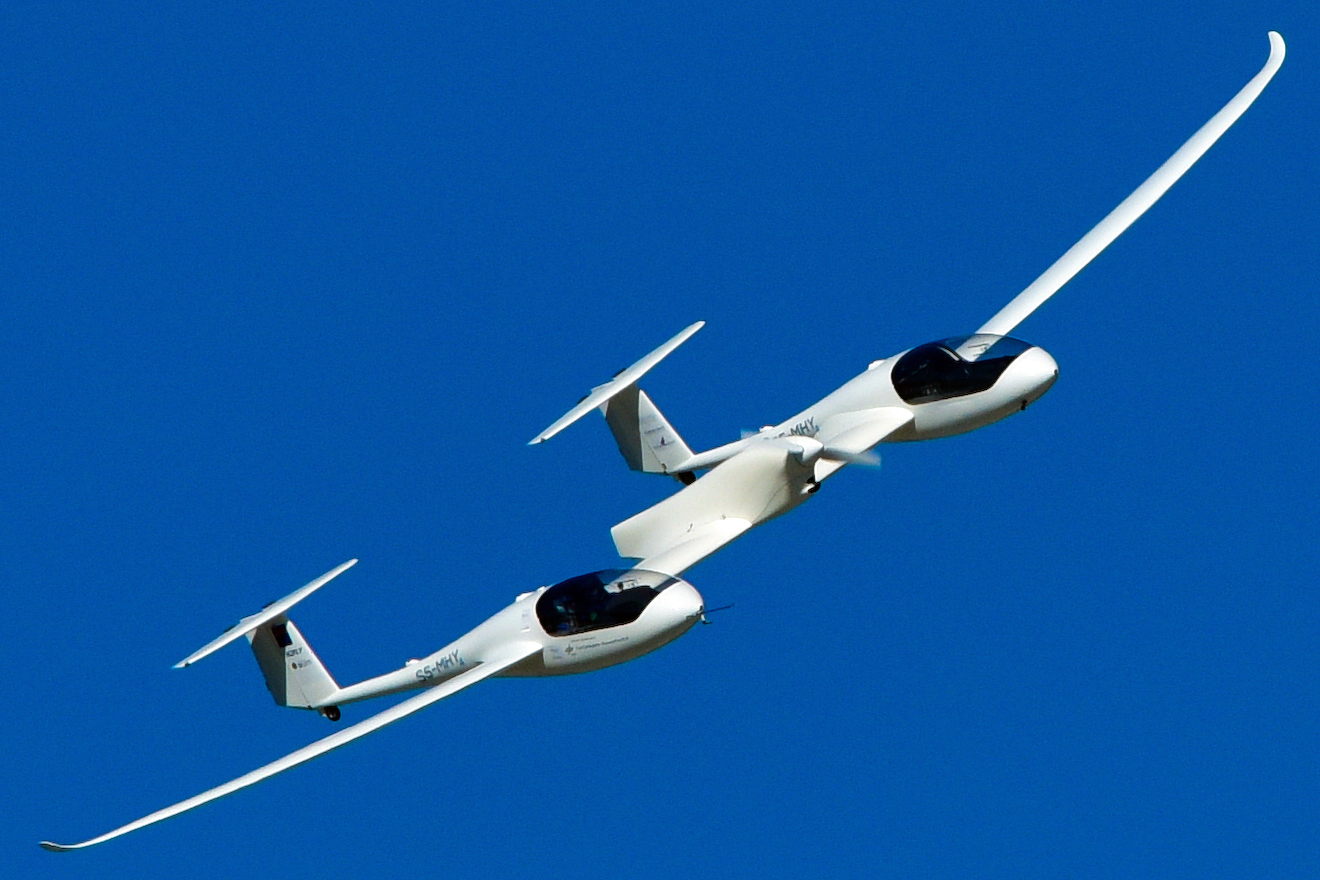

General information
- Type: Technology demonstrator
- National origin: Germany
- Manufacturer: DLR and Pipistrel
- Status: In development
- Number built: 1

History
- First flight: 2016
- Developed from: Pipistrel Taurus G4

HY4 is a four seat hydrogen fuel cell powered aircraft. It made its first flight on 29 September 2016 from Stuttgart Airport in Germany, powered by gaseous hydrogen. It was designed by DLR Institute of Engineering Thermodynamics of the German Aerospace Center, based on the Taurus G4, manufactured by Pipistrel.

The HY4, operated by DLR spinoff H2Fly, completed the world's first piloted electric flights powered by liquid hydrogen in September 2023, with one flight lasting over three hours.
