= V300 =

V300 or V-300 may refer to:

- Cadillac Gage (Textron) LAV-300, a six-wheeled armoured fighting vehicle
- The Pipistrel Nuuva V300 unmanned cargo aircraft (under development)
- The missiles fired by the Soviet SA-1 Guild surface-to-air missile system
