= Pipistrel =

Slovenian light aircraft manufacturer

Pipistrel d.o.o Ajdovščina
- Type: Subsidiary
- Industry: Aerospace
- Founded: 1989; 37 years ago
- Headquarters: Ajdovščina, Slovenia
- Key people: Ivo Boscarol (chairman)
- Products: Ultralight aircraft
- Owner: Textron Aviation
- Number of employees: 250 (June 2020)
- Parent: Textron
- Website: www.pipistrel-aircraft.com

Pipistrel d.o.o Ajdovščina is a Slovenian light aircraft manufacturer established in 1989 by Ivo Boscarol and based in Ajdovščina. Its facilities are located in Ajdovščina, Slovenia, and near Gorizia, Italy. By March 2019, Pipistrel had produced more than 2000 aircraft.

In April 2022, the company was purchased by Textron.

== History ==
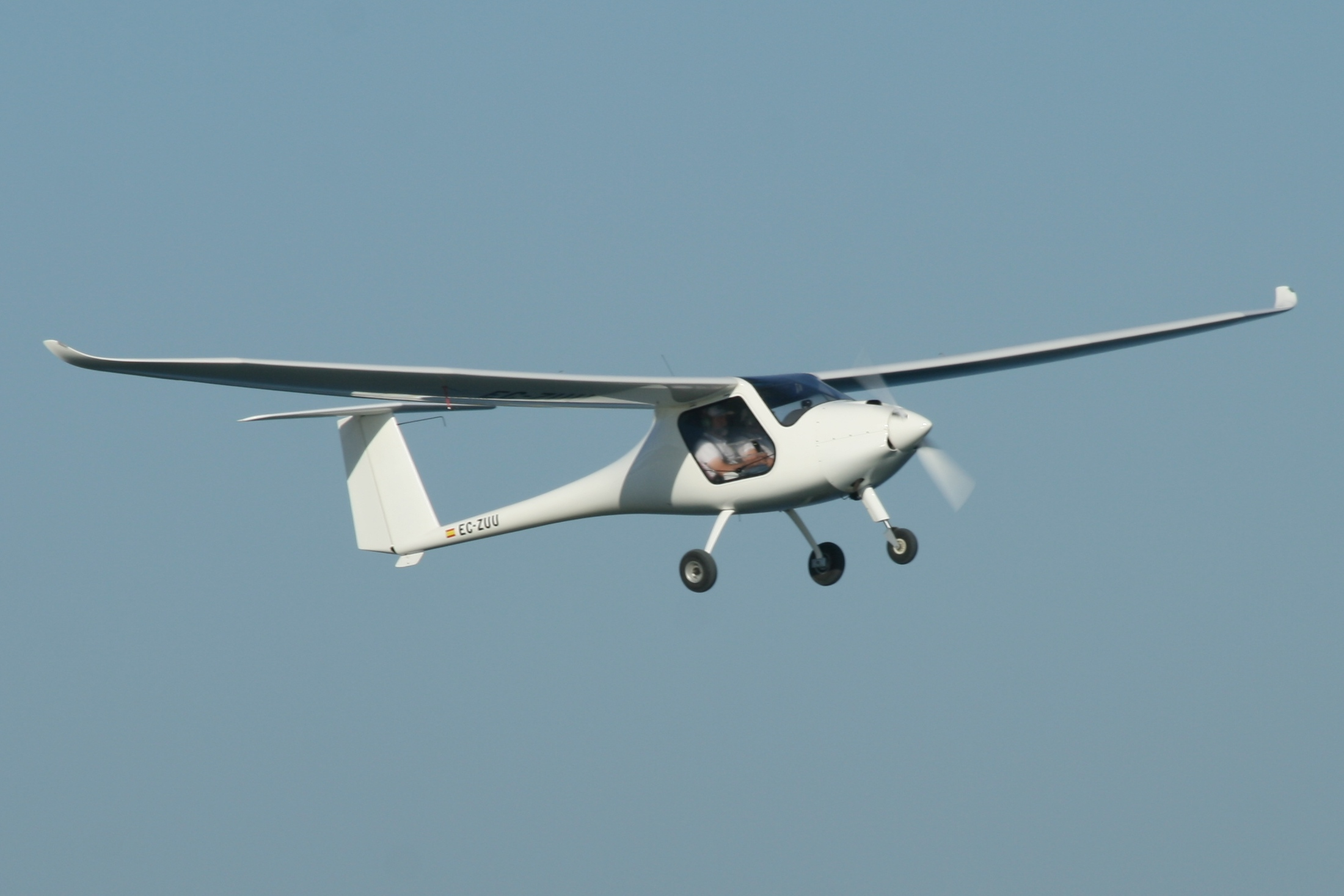
Pipistrel Sinus

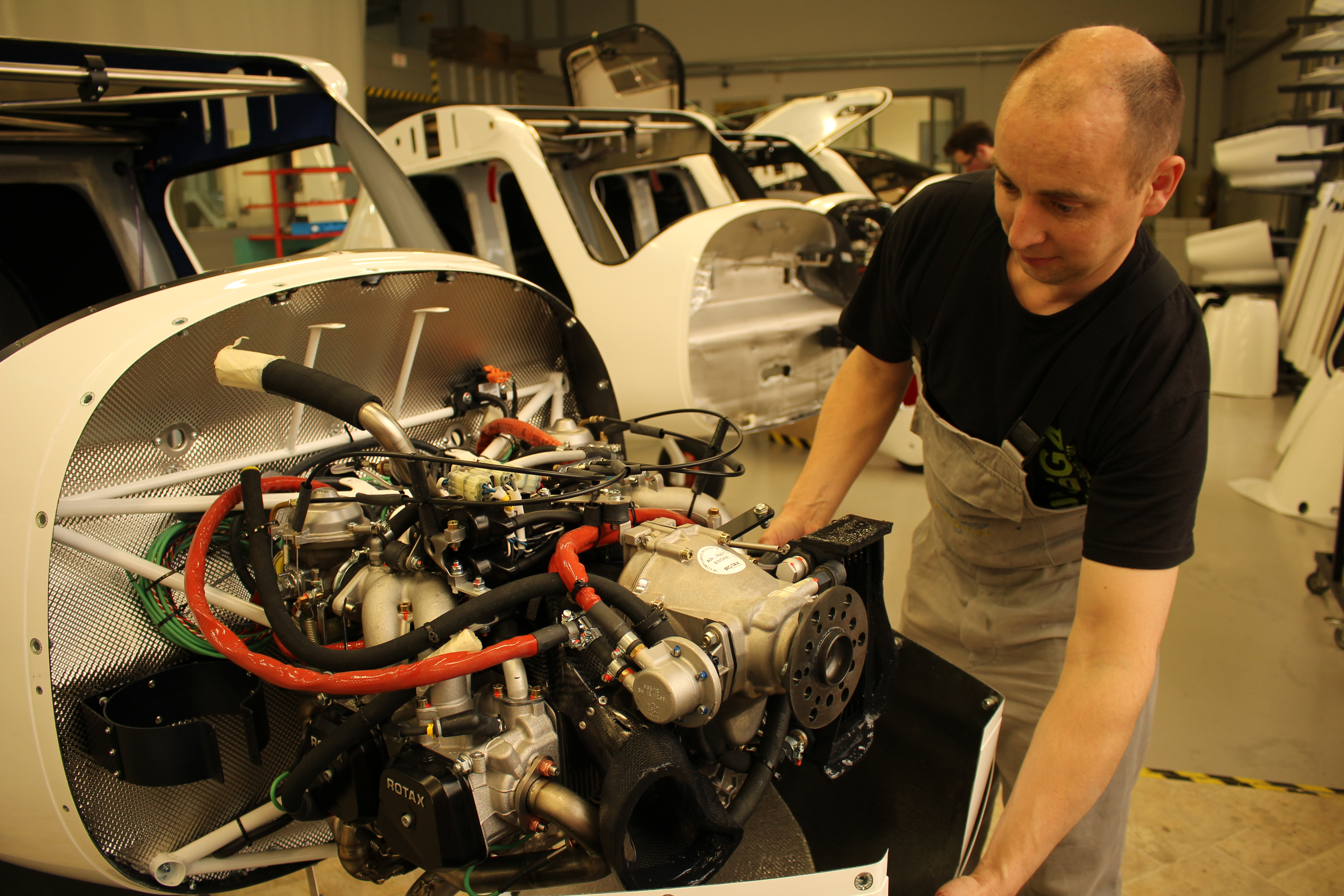
A light-sport aircraft being assembled at the Pipistrel Ajdovščina factory

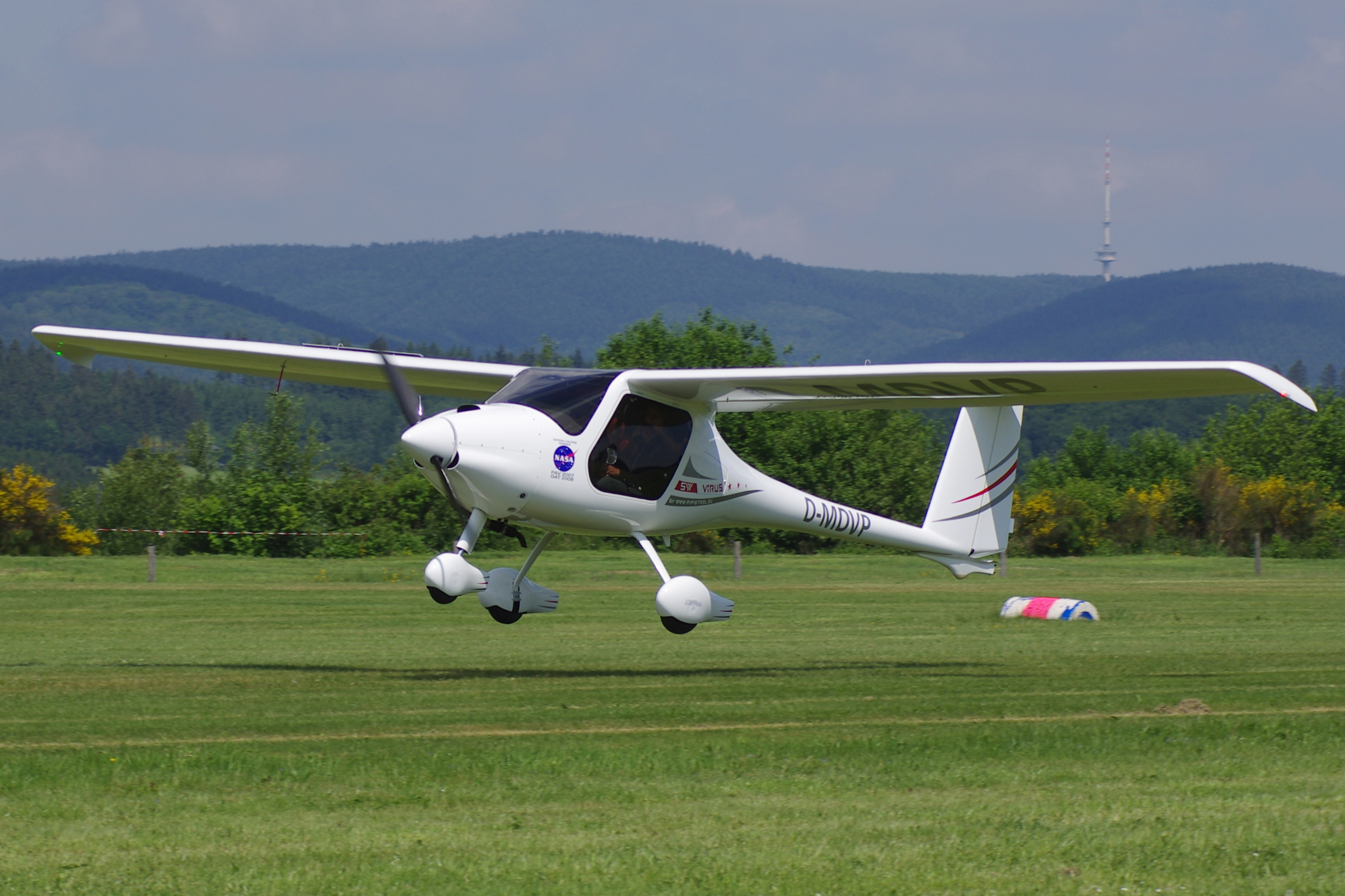
Pipistrel Virus SW

Due to legal restrictions imposed by the Yugoslavian government during the 1980s, Pipistrel's first aircraft was flown secretly in the evening between dusk and dark. The flying times and triangular shape of the hang-glider style wings earned the aircraft the nickname "bats," which was adopted by the company naming themselves after the Italian word for bat, pipistrello.

Initially, Pipistrel produced only powered hang gliders designed by Ivo Boscarol, who produced experimental ultralight trikes with a group of his friends as a private enterprise starting in the mid 1980s. The first serially-built ultralight trike, the Basic, was built in 1989, so the company counts this as the official beginning of Pipistrel, although the first mention of the brand name appeared in 1987. Thirty-two examples of the Basic were sold. The Plus was added to the line in 1990, the Spider in 1992, and Twister in 1998. The Spider was marketed in Europe in the early 2000s by Flight Team UG & Company AG of Ippesheim, Germany. During the company's first ten years in operation, the trike models were exported to more than 30 countries in Europe and Africa, with almost 600 units were produced. Trike production was discontinued in the early 2000s.

On 18 November 1992, the company was officially registered as Pipistrel d.o.o. with Vida Lorbek as the first manager.

In the mid 1990s, when composite materials became more widely used, Pipistrel moved from the production of powered hang-gliders to ultralight aircraft that resemble full-sized airplanes. One of the early models, the Sinus, was the first serially-built ultralight made out of composite materials.

In 2003, Pipistrel moved into a purpose-built facility next to the Ajdovščina Airport.

In 2004, Pipistrel released the world's first side-by-side 2-seat self-launching glider, the Pipistrel Taurus.

In 2007 and 2008, Pipistrel claimed two consecutive victories at NASA Centennial Challenges. In the 2007 Personal Air Vehicle challenge, the modified Pipistrel Virus, owned by Vance Turner and piloted by Pipistrel's general distributor for USA, won most of the categories. In 2008, similar results were achieved by the team at "General Aviation Technology" challenge.

In August 2012, Pipistrel was hit by a week-long import ban issued by the Federal Aviation Administration. Pipistrel had opened a factory in Italy to benefit from the country's bilateral agreements with the United States. During a routine check, the FAA was unable to locate Pipistrel's Italian factory on Google Earth and banned the import of some of Pipistrel's products.

On 12 October 2015, Pipistrel won an international tender issued by the Indian Ministry of Defence to supply 194 Pipistrel Virus SW 80 trainers to the Indian Air Force, Indian Navy and National Cadet Corps.

By June 2016, Pipistrel had produced 800 examples from the Sinus and Virus series. By May 2018 this number had increased to more than 900. The 1000th aircraft of the Virus and Sinus family was delivered by March 2019.

=== Electric aircraft development ===
In 2007, an electric version of the Taurus was released, the world's first 2-seat fully electric aircraft and the first electric motor-glider to achieve serial production. In 2008, Popular Science magazine listed Taurus Electro among Ten Best Innovations of the year in the Aviation&Space category.

The Taurus G4, developed in 2011, was the first all-electric four-seat aircraft. It used the most powerful electric motor in an all-electric airplane design at that time.

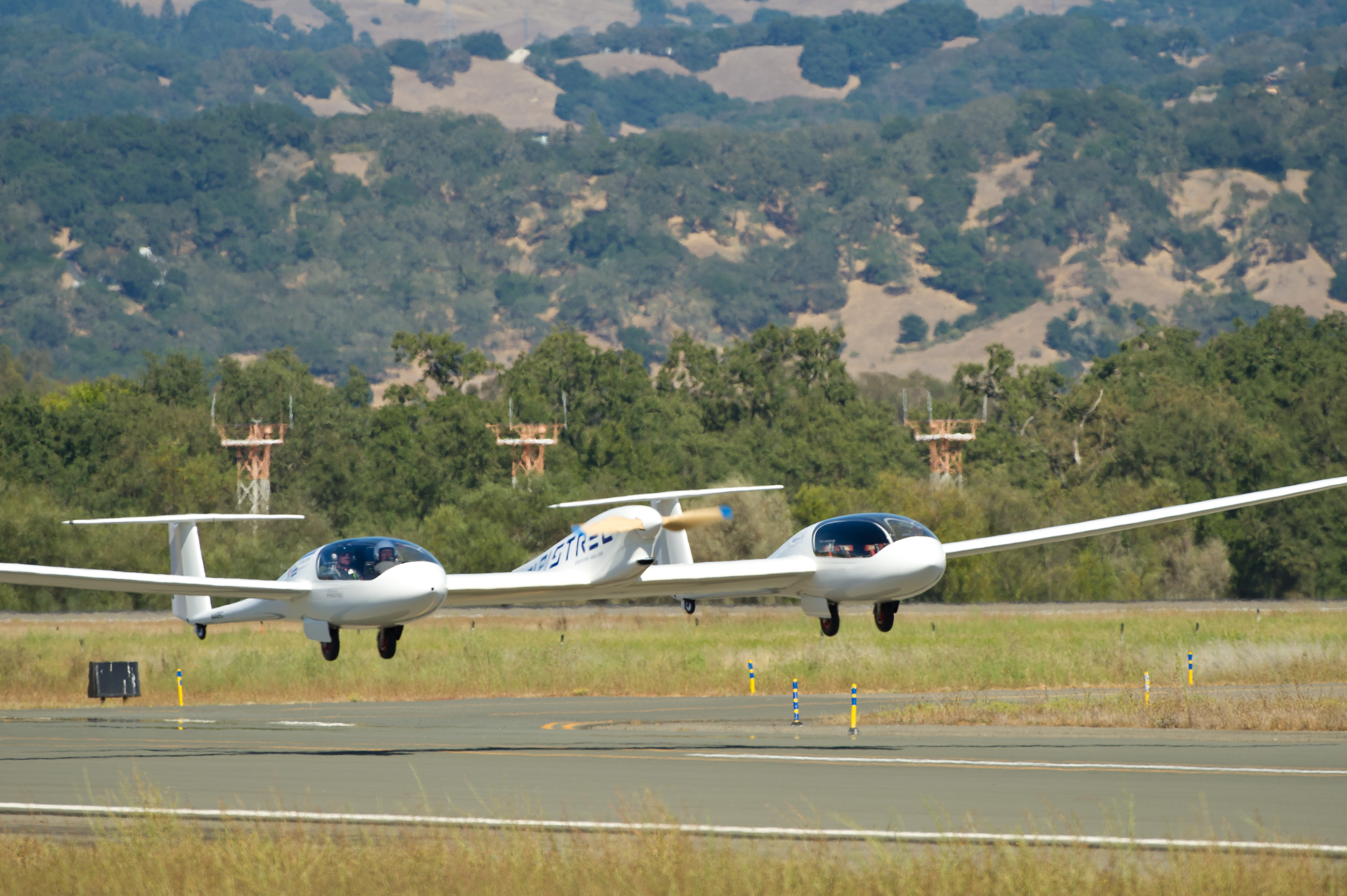
The electric Taurus G4 taking off from Sonoma County Airport in California

In July 2015, Siemens, provider of the Dynadyn 60-kilowatt (80 hp) motor used in the Alpha Electro trainer, warned Pipistrel that it should not use its motors for overwater flights, just as Pipistrel was about to launch a historic electric-powered flight across the English Channel and back. As it turns out, Airbus was preparing exactly the same Louis Blériot-like exploit, with a plane powered by a motor also provided by Siemens, and it was speculated that Siemens was pressured by Airbus.

In February 2016, Pipistrel ran the most powerful hybrid electric powertrain in aviation to date, as a part of the project HYPSTAIR. The EU funded the Hypstair program: a Pipistrel Panthera mockup received a serial hybrid-electric powertrain, ground testing a 200-kilowatt (270 hp) motor driven by batteries only, by a 100-kilowatt (130 hp) generator-only and by both combined. The Hypstair program is followed by Mahepa project from 2017, EU-funded over four years. Panthera ground testing is planned for 2019 before flight tests in 2020.

On 29 September 2016, the world's first four-seat passenger aircraft powered by a zero-emission hydrogen fuel cell propulsion system accomplished a successful first public flight. Pipistrel was one of the partners in the "HY4" project. The dual-fuselage, battery-powered Taurus G4 received a DLR hydrogen fuel cell powertrain to fly as the HY4, with hydrogen tanks and batteries in the fuselages, fuel cells and motor in the central nacelle. Partners are German motor and inverter developer Compact Dynamics, Ulm University, TU Delft, Politecnico di Milano and University of Maribor. Ground and flight tests should follow those of the hybrid Panthera a couple of months later. The HY4 flew in April 2022.

In June 2019, the company had formed a new R&D sister company, "Pipistrel Vertical Solutions," to develop the Pipistrel 801 electric VTOL aircraft.

On 10 June 2020, the Pipistrel Velis Electro, the fully-electric version of the Virus SW 121, received the World's first type certificate for an electric aircraft from EASA.

On 1 September 2020, the company introduced two cargo carrying electric drones, the Pipistrel Nuuva V300 and the smaller Pipistrel Nuuva V20.

Pipistrel is planning a liquid hydrogen fuel cell and battery-powered 19-seat hybrid “Miniliner” for a project launch in 2021, a first flight in 2028, and service entry in 2030 or 2031. A 8,500-9,000 kg (18,700-19,800 lb) maximum take-off weight, slightly above the hopefully relaxed 8,618 kg EASA CS-23 limit, would allow a 1,000 nmi (1,900 km) range. Batteries would be used for short takeoffs, down to 800 m (2,620 ft), with 2 MW (2,700 hp) of installed power. It would use technology from EU-funded MAHEPA and UNIFIER19 programmes, and three different configurations are evaluated while the composite wing and fuselage are fixed. Pipistrel targets a 1,500 aircraft market and 40% lower operating costs than current commuter aircraft.

=== Acquisition by Textron ===
In March 2022, Textron entered into an agreement to buy Pipistrel and form a new division for electric aircraft development, to be called Textron eAviation. Pipistrel will continue as a brand and retain its existing headquarters and operations in Slovenia and Italy. Textron will invest in the division to hasten future aircraft development and production. Pipistrel's founder and CEO, Ivo Boscarol, will stay on as a minority shareholder and also as the Chairman Emeritus. The purchase was completed in April 2022 at a price of US$235M.

== Aircraft ==
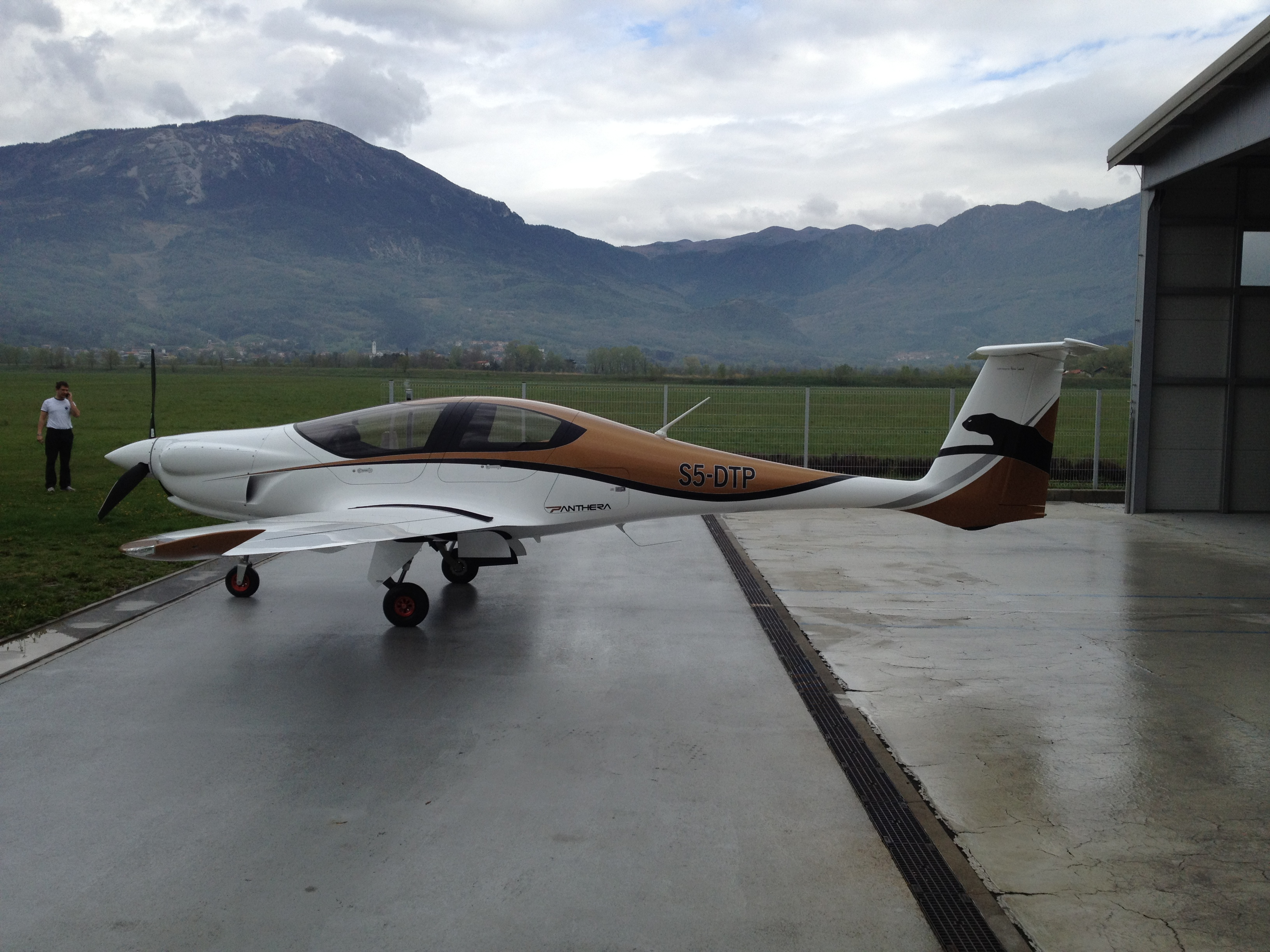
Pipistrel Panthera

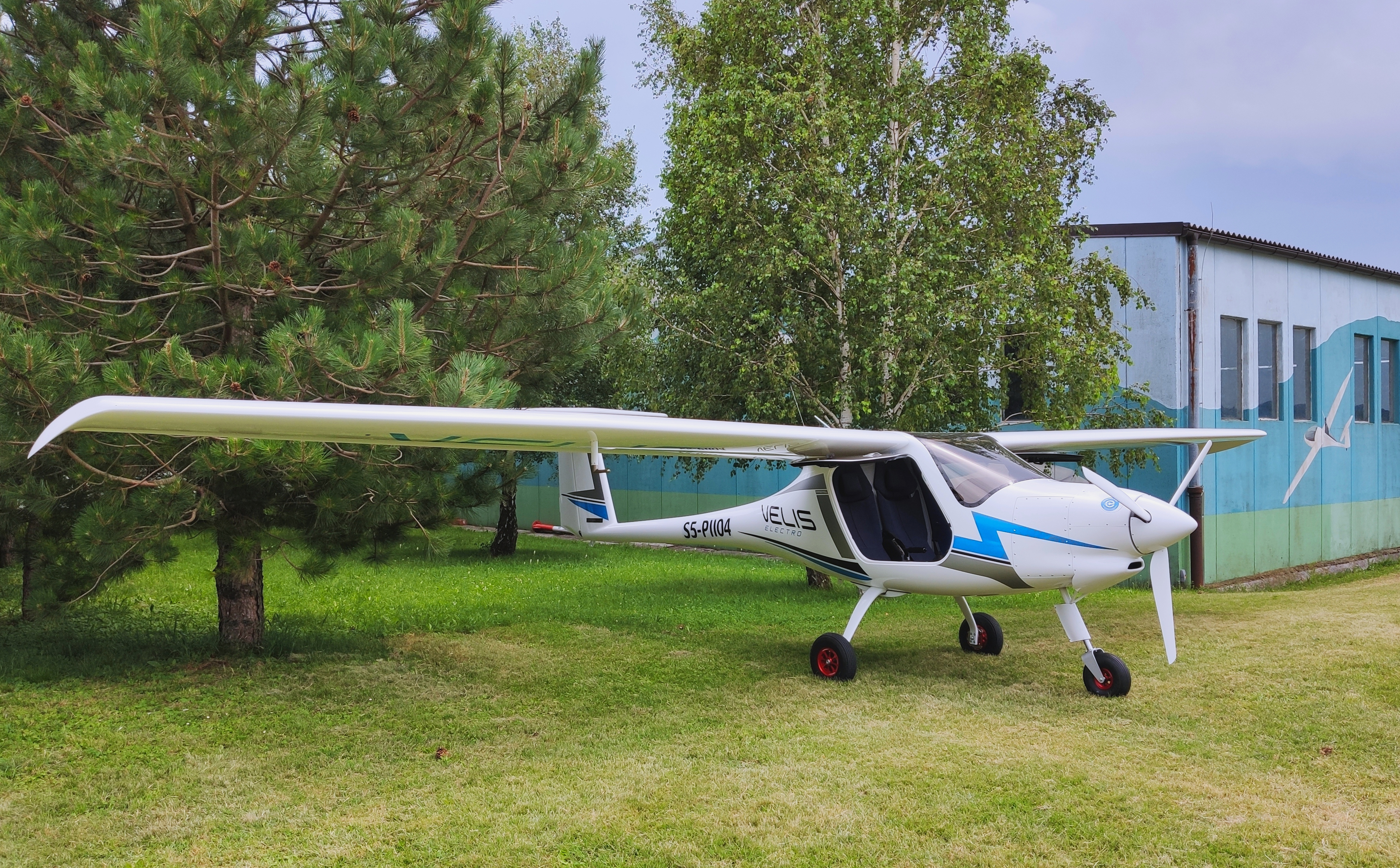
Pipistrel Velis Electro

=== Gliders and light aircraft ===
- Pipistrel Alpha Trainer – high-wing, single piston-engined, two-seat aircraft.
- Pipistrel Apis – ultralight single-seat glider.
- Pipistrel Apis-Bee – ultralight single-seat glider and motor glider.
- Pipistrel Panthera – low-wing, single piston-engined, four-seat aircraft.
- Pipistrel Sinus – high-wing, single piston-engined, two-seat ultralight motor glider.
- Pipistrel Taurus – ultralight, single piston-engined, two-seat motor glider.
- Pipistrel Virus – ultralight, single piston-engined, two-seat aircraft.
- Pipistrel Virus SW – ultralight, single piston-engined, two-seat aircraft.
- Pipistrel Velis Club – ultralight, single piston-engined, two-seat aircraft.
- Pipistrel Voyager – ultralight, single piston-engined, two-seat aircraft.

=== Electric aircraft ===
- Pipistrel Alpha Electro – high-wing, single electric-engined, two-seat aircraft.
- Pipistrel Apis Electro
- Pipistrel Taurus Electro – ultralight, single electric-engined, two-seat motor glider.
- Pipistrel Taurus G4 – experimental, single electric-engined, four-seat aircraft.
- Pipistrel WATTsUP – experimental, single electric-engined, two-seat aircraft. The predecessor of the Alpha Electro.
- Pipistrel Velis Electro – high-wing, single electric-engined, two-seat aircraft. First type-certified electric aeroplane in the world.

=== Ultralight trikes ===
- Pipistrel Basic
- Pipistrel Plus
- Pipistrel Spider – single piston-engined, two-seat trike.
- Pipistrel Twister – single piston-engined, two-seat trike.

=== VTOL ===
- Pipistrel 801 eVTOL – five-seat, single-pilot, eVTOL aircraft. In development as one of the proposals for Uber Elevate.
- Pipistrel Nuuva V300 – 300-kg payload class, tandem-wing, cargo eVTOL UAV. In development.
- Pipistrel Nuuva V20 – 20-kg payload class, tandem-wing, cargo eVTOL UAV. In development.

== Awards and records ==
- In 2004, the Sinus accomplished a record-breaking flight around the world, the first ever ultralight aircraft to do so, flown by a Slovenian pilot, Matevž Lenarčič.
- 2007 NASA Centennial Challenges Personal Air Vehicle Challenge in 2007
- 2008: General Aviation Technology Challenge
- In December 2007, the aircraft Taurus Electro took off as the world's first fully electric 2-seat aircraft. It was named as one of the most important innovations in 2008 by the American magazine Popular Science. In 2010, it won a gold medal at the Biennial of Industrial Design.
- 2011: CAFE/NASA/Google Green Flight Challenge for energy-efficient aircraft with its four-seater electric plane Taurus G4.
- 10 FAI world records.
- In 2019, the Sinus completed two record making flights when Aarohi Pandit became the first woman pilot to fly solo across the Atlantic Ocean and the Pacific Ocean in a light-sport aircraft.

== See also ==
- Personal Air Vehicle
- List of gliders
