= Pipistrel Spider =

Slovenian ultralight trike

Spider

General information
- Type: Ultralight trike
- National origin: Slovenia
- Manufacturer: Pipistrel
- Status: Production complete (2018)
- Number built: 250 (1998)

History
- Manufactured: 1980s - present
- Introduction date: 1980s

The Pipistrel Spider is a Slovenian ultralight trike, designed and produced by Pipistrel of Ajdovščina. The aircraft is supplied as a kit for amateur construction or as a complete ready-to-fly-aircraft.

The Spider was sold in Europe by Flight Team UG & Company AG of Ippesheim, Germany and was sometimes called the Flight Team Spider.

By October 2018 it was listed as a "legacy" product and production had ended.

== Design and development ==
The aircraft was designed to comply with the Fédération Aéronautique Internationale microlight category, including the category's maximum gross weight of 450 kg (992 lb). The aircraft has a maximum gross weight of 450 kg (992 lb). It features a cable-braced hang glider-style high-wing, weight-shift controls, a two-seats-in-tandem open cockpit with an optional cockpit fairing, tricycle landing gear with wheel pants and a single engine in pusher configuration.

The aircraft is made from composites and steel tubing, with its double surface wing covered in Dacron sailcloth. A number of different wings can be fitted to the basic carriage, but typically a 10.50 m (34.4 ft) span wing is supported by a single tube-type kingpost and uses an "A" frame weight-shift control bar. The powerplant is a twin cylinder, air-cooled, two-stroke, dual-ignition 50 hp (37 kW) Rotax 503 or the twin cylinder, liquid-cooled, two-stroke, dual-ignition 64 hp (48 kW) Rotax 582 engine. The aircraft has an empty weight of 130 kg (287 lb) and a gross weight of 450 kg (992 lb), giving a useful load of 320 kg (705 lb). With full fuel of 42 litres (9.2 imp gal; 11 US gal) the payload is 290 kg (639 lb).

The standard day, sea level, no wind, take off and landing roll with a 50 hp (37 kW) engine is 30 m (98 ft).

The manufacturer estimates the construction time from the supplied kit as 150 hours.

== Operational history ==
By 1998 the company reported that 250 kits had been sold were flying.

== Specifications (Spider) ==
Data from Purdy

General characteristics

- Crew: one
- Capacity: one passenger
- Wingspan: 10.50 m (34 ft 5 in)
- Empty weight: 129.75 kg (286 lb)
- Gross weight: 450 kg (992 lb)
- Fuel capacity: 42 litres (9.2 imp gal; 11 US gal)
- Powerplant: 1 × Rotax 503 twin cylinder, liquid-cooled, two stroke aircraft engine, 37 kW (50 hp)
- Propellers: 4-bladed ground adjustable composite

Performance

- Maximum speed: 179 km/h (111 mph, 96 kn)
- Cruise speed: 121 km/h (75 mph, 65 kn)
- Stall speed: 55 km/h (34 mph, 30 kn)
- Range: 500 km (310 mi, 270 nmi)
- Service ceiling: 6,700 m (22,000 ft)
- Rate of climb: 5.00 m/s (984 ft/min)
