= Pipistrel Nuuva V300 =

Unmanned hybrid-electric VTOL cargo aircraft

Nuuva V300

General information
- Type: eVTOL cargo aircraft
- National origin: Slovenia
- Manufacturer: Pipistrel
- Status: In development (2025)
- Number built: 2 prototypes

History
- Introduction date: 2023 (announced)
- First flight: 31 January 2025

The Pipistrel Nuuva V300 is an unmanned hybrid-electric VTOL cargo aircraft currently under development by Pipistrel. The aircraft has eight electric motors driving propellers providing lift as well as a single internal combustion engine driving a propeller providing thrust. The company claims that the aircraft will be able to operate with a typical cargo weight of 300 kg (661 lb) and a typical range of 300 nmi (556 km). In October 2020 the company announced that the aircraft would implement a Honeywell fly-by-wire system.

== Design and development ==
The aircraft is a tandem wing design, with the rear wing of a larger wingspan than the front one. Both wings are attached to a fuselage, which features a large front door on the nose to access the internal 3 m^{3} (110 cu ft) cargo hold and an internal combustion engine with a pusher propeller at the rear end.

A pair of booms, one at each side of the aircraft, connect both wings and serve primarily to support eight electric engines intended for vertical propulsion. Each electric engine turns a 2-blade propeller.

In October 2020 the company announced that the aircraft would implement a Honeywell fly-by-wire system with triple redundancy for the autonomous flight control of the vehicle. The flight itself would be autonomous but managed remotely by a ground-based operator. In January 2025, the company announced the ground control station was developed in collaboration with Textron Systems.

Pipistrel is planning for the Nuuva V300 to enter service in the second half of 2023. A smaller variant, the Nuuva V20, is expected to start operating as early as 2021 and would carry payloads of up to 20 kg (44 lb).

On 31 January 2025 Pipistrel announced the first hover flight of the Nuuva V300 in Gorizia, Italy.

== Specifications ==
Data from manufacturer. and eVTOL News

General characteristics

- Crew: none
- Capacity: up to 460 kg (1,010 lb) of cargo on 3 euro-pallets
- Length: 11.3 m (37 ft 1 in)
- Wingspan: 13.2 m (43 ft 4 in)
- Height: 3.1 m (10 ft 2 in)
- Wing area: 23 m^{2} (250 sq ft)
- Max takeoff weight: 1,700 kg (3,748 lb)
- Fuel capacity: 81 L (21 US gal) typical, 410 L (110 US gal) maximum, MOGAS, AVGAS or car gasoline
- Powerplant: 1 × internal combustion aircraft engine
- Powerplant: 8 × Pipistrel E-811 electric engine, powered by lithium batteries
- Propellers: 2-bladed vertical lift units

Performance

- Maximum speed: 220 km/h (137 mph, 119 kn)
- Cruise speed: 165 km/h (102 mph, 89 kn)
- Range: 300 km (190 mi, 160 nmi) with 300 kg of payload
- Service ceiling: 6,000 m (20,000 ft)
- Rate of climb: 3 m/s (590 ft/min)

Avionics

- Honeywell compact fly-by-wire system

== See also ==
- Pipistrel 801 eVTOL
