= Ajdovščina Airfield =

Aerodrome in Ajdovščina, Slovenia

Ajdovščina Airfield Letališče Ajdovščina
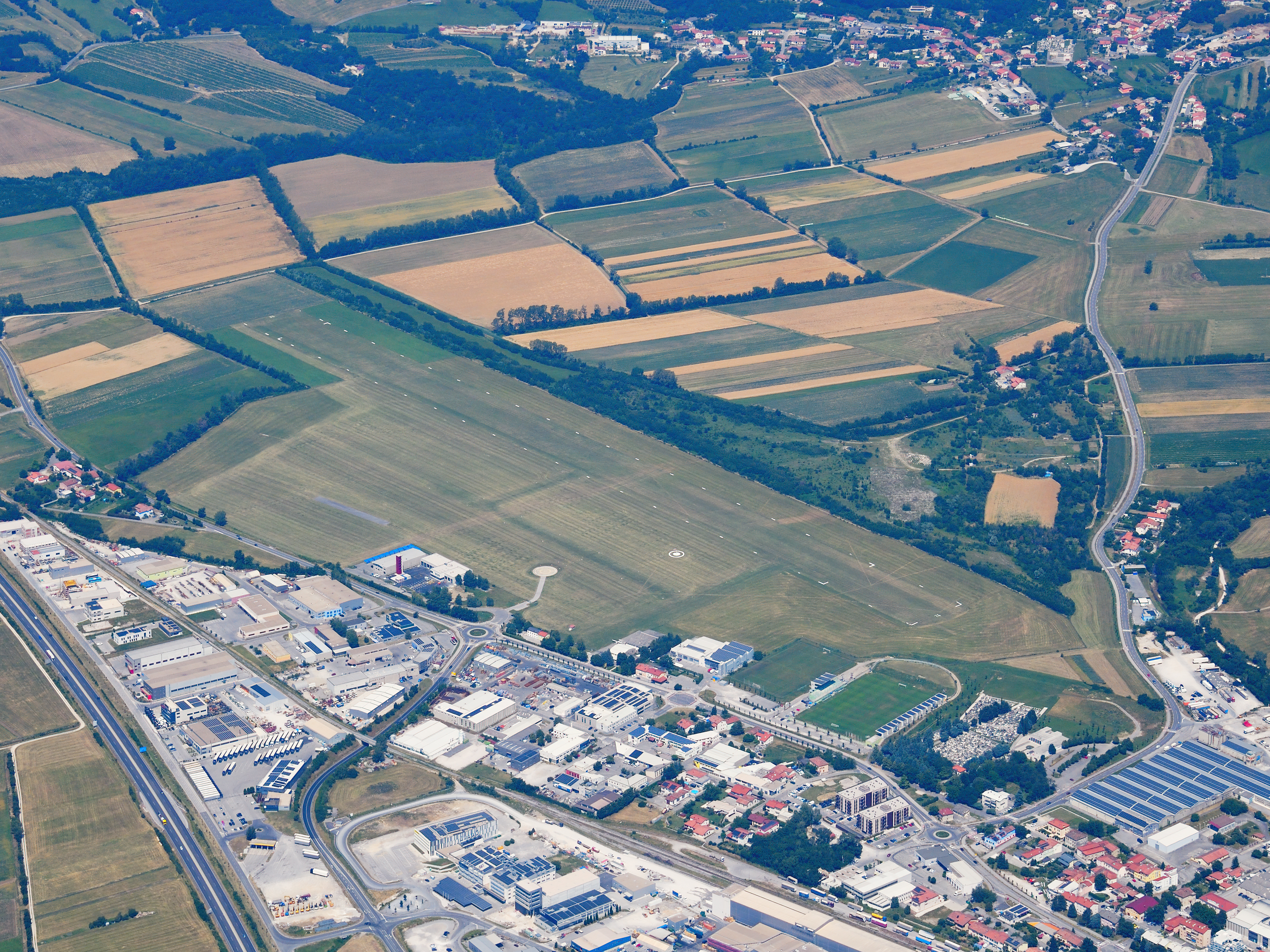
- IATA: none; ICAO: LJAJ

Summary
- Airport type: Public
- Operator: Aeroclub Josip Krizaj d.d
- Serves: Ajdovščina
- Location: Ajdovščina
- Elevation AMSL: 117 m / 384 ft
- Coordinates: 45°53′19.33″N 013°53′13.46″E
- Website: http://www.aeroklub-jk-ajdovscina.si
- Interactive map of Ajdovščina Airfield

Runways
Direction	Length		Surface
Direction	m	ft	Surface
08/26	1,000	3,280.83	Grass

Ajdovščina Airfield (ICAO: LJAJ) (Slovene: Letališče Ajdovščina) is a local airfield and tourist aerodrome in the Vipava Valley, Slovenia. The field was originally built for the Battles of the Isonzo and is today home to the Josip Križaj Ajdovščina Aeroclub and the ultralight aircraft manufacturer Pipistrel. The flying club is named after the Slovene war ace Josip Križaj (a.k.a. Giuseppe Krizai).
