= Pipistrel Velis Electro =

First type certified electric aircraft

Velis Electro
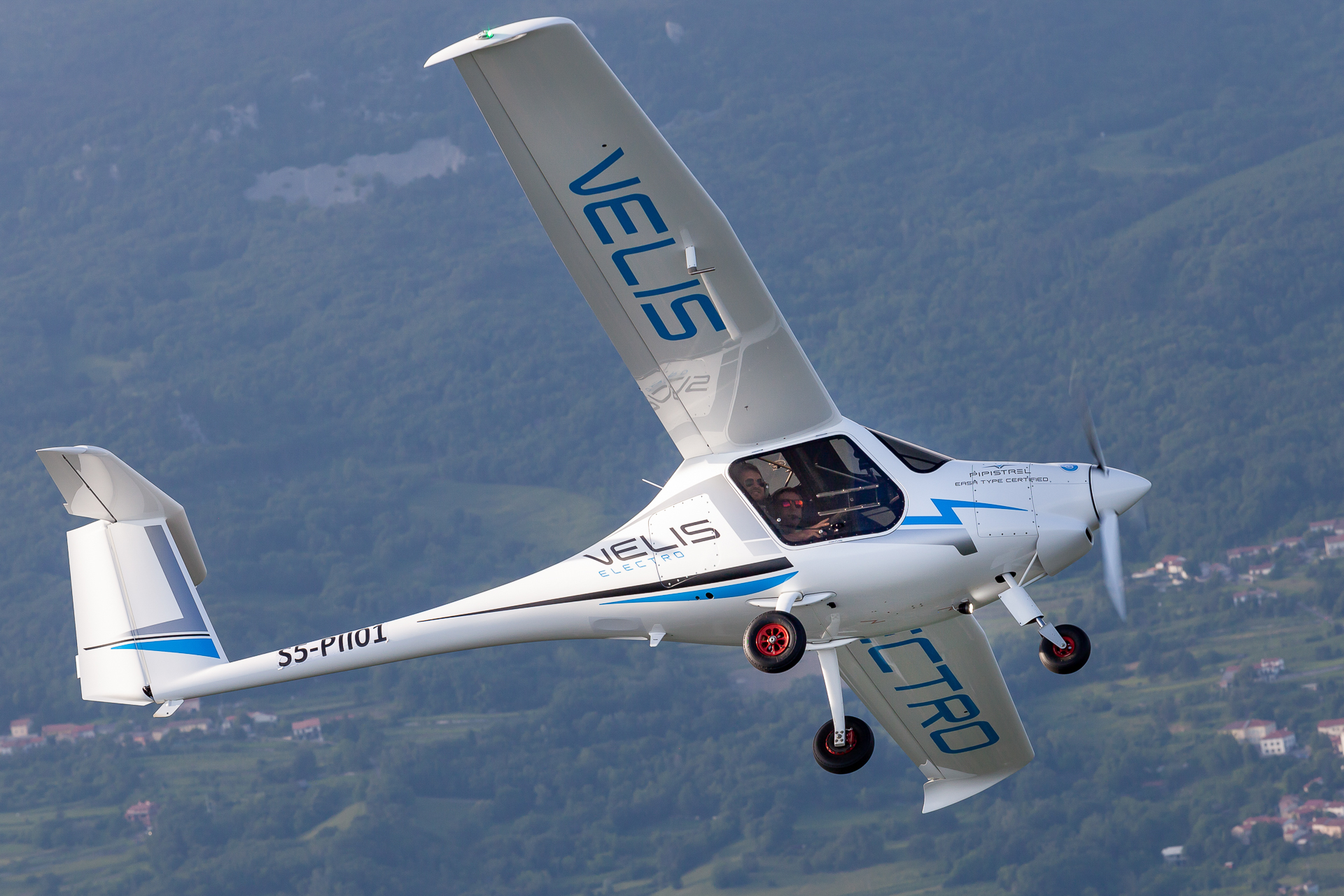

General information
- Type: Electric light aircraft
- National origin: Slovenia
- Manufacturer: Pipistrel
- Status: In production
- Primary user: Slovenian Air Force; Royal Danish Air Force

History
- Manufactured: 2020–present
- Introduction date: 2020
- Developed from: Pipistrel Virus

The Pipistrel Velis Electro is a Slovenian light aircraft, designed and produced by Pipistrel of Ajdovščina. The aircraft was EASA CS-LSA fully electric type certified in June 2020 and it is intended primarily for the training aircraft role, particularly multiple successive take-off and landings at the airfield. The design is the first type certified electric aircraft and is supplied complete and ready-to-fly.

== Design ==
The aircraft is based on the Pipistrel Virus airframe and features a cantilever high-wing, a two-seats-in-side-by-side configuration in an enclosed cabin accessed via doors. It has a stick shaker and fixed tricycle landing gear and a single electric motor in tractor configuration.

The airframe is predominantly made from composite materials. Its 10.71 m (35.1 ft) span wing, has an area of 9.5 m^{2} (102 sq ft), an aspect ratio of 12.03:1, an IMD 029-b airfoil and mounts three-position flaps, with settings of 0°, 8° and 19°.

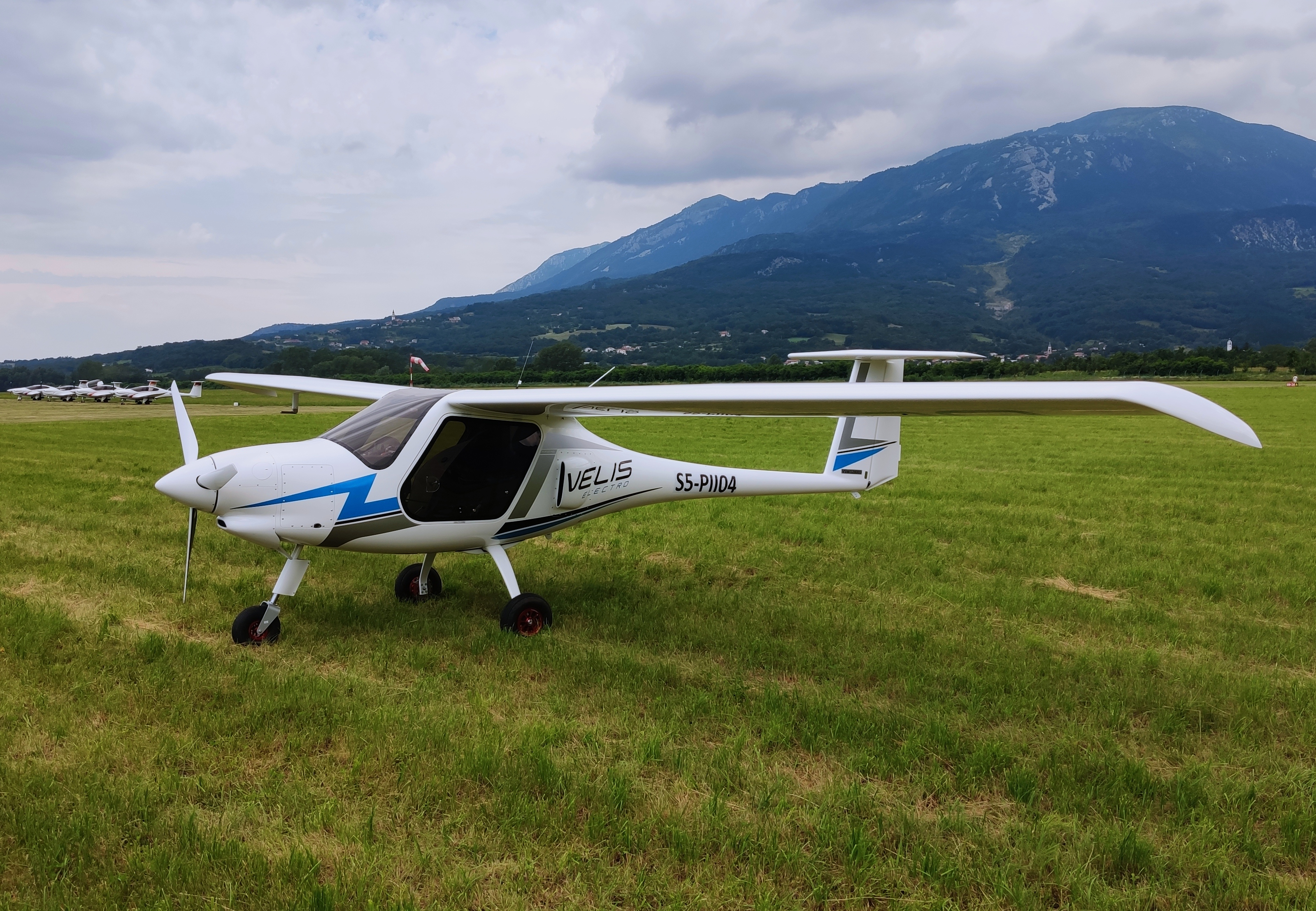
Pipistrel Velis Electro

The sole approved powerplant is the liquid-cooled Pipistrel E-811 electric motor, rated at 57.6 kW (77 hp) at 2500 rpm for 90 seconds for take-off and 49.2 kW (66 hp) at 2350 rpm for continuous operation. The motor was developed in conjunction with the Slovenian engineering companies Emrax and Emsiso. It is powered by a 345 VDC, 20 kWh battery pack, in two 70 kg (150 lb) liquid-cooled lithium batteries by Pipistrel, connected in parallel for fault tolerance. One battery is mounted in the nose and one behind the cabin for balance. They take 2 hours to recharge from 30% to 100% capacity, and allow an endurance of up to 50 minutes plus 10 minutes of VFR reserves when flying in proximity of the aerodrome. The motor radiator is mounted in the nose, which necessitates a different engine cowling from the Virus design. The battery radiator is mounted in the rear. Due to the liquid cooling and the weight of the battery unit, the batteries are not swappable, unlike the battery replacement system in the Alpha Electro. Take-off is not allowed when battery state of charge (SoC) is below 50%.

The aircraft has a built-in continuous Battery management system displaying the estimated 'age' of the battery, and the battery must be charged using proprietary equipment. The E-811 is the first certified electric aircraft motor and was certified by EASA on 18 May 2020.

The Velis Electro has a maximum noise level of 60 dBa.

The aircraft has an empty weight of 428 kg (944 lb) and a gross weight of 600 kg (1,300 lb), giving a useful load of 172 kg (379 lb).

== Development ==
The design received its European Union Aviation Safety Agency (EASA) type certificate for day, visual flight rules operations, on 10 June 2020, after a certification period of just under three years. The short time frame for the first certification of an electric aircraft was attributed by EASA to "close co-operation" between the manufacturer and the agency. The design was approved as a variant of the Virus on the same type certificate and is officially designated by EASA as the Virus SW 128 (Velis Electro).

The aircraft is in production and the manufacturer has indicated that they intend to deliver 31 examples during 2020. The first one was delivered on 16 July 2020 to a customer in Switzerland. In January 2021, Pipistrel announced an order for 50 Velis Electro from Green Aerolease from France. The aircraft will be leased to French flight schools in cooperation with the FFA. A similar deal was announced in October 2021 by the British company Green Airside, which will acquire 50 Velis Electros for rental to flight schools in the United Kingdom.

== Operational history ==
In August and September 2020, a group of Swiss electric mobility enthusiasts with support from the manufacturer flew a Velis Electro on a series of flights intended to be accepted as world records. Records were claimed for the lowest energy consumption (22.76 kWh/100 km), the highest average speed over a 100 km (136 km/h) and a 700 km (125 km/h) route, longest electrically flown route over 24 hours (327 km), 48 hours (608 km) and 56 hours (839 km). The plane was used in the education of flight students in 2024.

Worldwide shipments
Aircraft	2020	2021	2022	2023	2024	2025	Total
Pipistrel Velis Electro	13	48	16	16	16	1	110

=== Accolades ===
The Pipistrel Velis Electro has received several awards since its introduction. In November 2020, Plane & Pilot Magazine named it the "2020 Plane of the Year". In August 2021, the Velis Electro received the 2021 AIAA Aircraft Design Award. The Velis Electro is one of the winners of the 2021 Aviation Week Network's Laureate Awards in the category Business Aviation.

== Military operators ==
Slovenia

- Slovenian Air Force and Air Defence – five aircraft for evaluation from 2021

Former operators

Denmark

- Royal Danish Air Force – two aircraft leased for evaluation from 2021 to 2023.

== Specifications ==
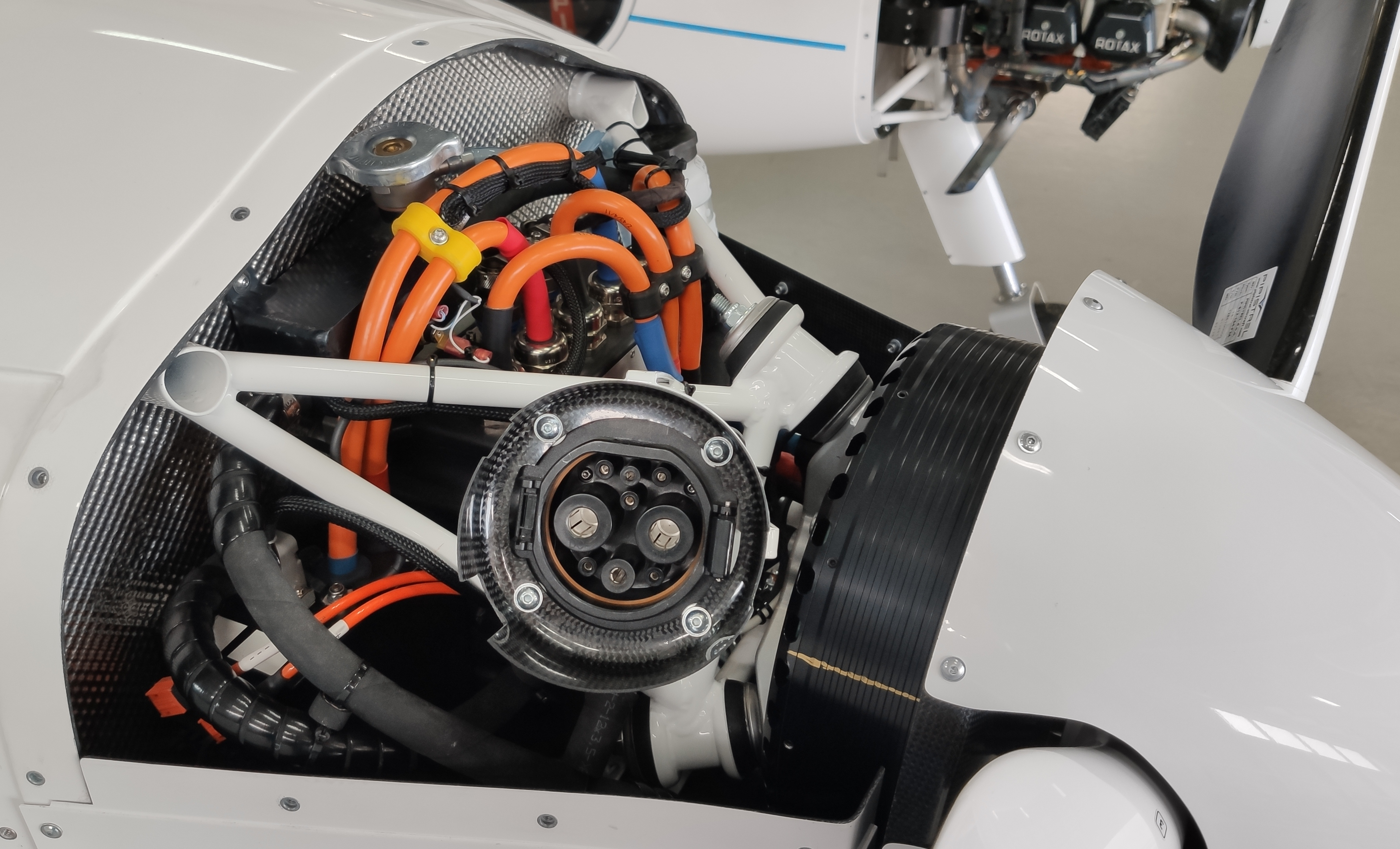
Pipistrel E-811 electric motor

Data from Pipistrel

General characteristics

- Crew: one
- Capacity: one passenger
- Length: 6.47 m (21 ft 3 in)
- Wingspan: 10.71 m (35 ft 2 in)
- Height: 1.9 m (6 ft 3 in)
- Wing area: 9.51 m^{2} (102.4 sq ft)
- Aspect ratio: 12.04
- Empty weight: 428 kg (944 lb)
- Max takeoff weight: 600 kg (1,323 lb)
- Fuel capacity: 24.8 kWh in two liquid-cooled Pipistrel batteries
- Payload: 172 kg (378 lb)
- Powerplant: 1 × Pipistrel E-811-268MVLC electric motor, 57.6 kW (77.2 hp)
- Propellers: 3-bladed Pipistrel P-812/164-F3A, fixed pitch, composite, 1.640 m (5 ft 5 in) diameter

Performance

- Maximum speed: 181 km/h (113 mph, 98 kn)
- Cruise speed: 170 km/h (100 mph, 90 kn)
- Stall speed: 83 km/h (52 mph, 45 kn) flaps down
- Never exceed speed: 200 km/h (124 mph, 108 kn)
- Endurance: 50 minutes, plus VFR reserves
- Service ceiling: 3,700 m (12,000 ft)
- g limits: +4/-2
- Maximum glide ratio: 15:1
- Rate of climb: 3.3 m/s (650 ft/min)
- Wing loading: 63.1 kg/m^{2} (12.9 lb/sq ft)
- takeoff run/over 50′ obstacle (asphalt): 241/409 m (791/1,342 ft)

Avionics

- Pipistrel EPSI 570C cockpit display monitoring the electric propulsion system

== See also ==
- List of current production certified light aircraft
- List of electric aircraft
- Light-sport aircraft
- EASA CS-VLA
- NEBOair
