= Pipistrel 801 eVTOL =

Electric unmanned aircraft

801 eVTOL
- Artist's concept

General information
- Type: Electric aircraft
- National origin: Slovenia
- Manufacturer: Pipistrel
- Status: Under development (2019)

The Pipistrel 801 eVTOL is a Slovenian autonomous vertical take-off electric aircraft for the air taxi role under development by Pipistrel Vertical Solutions of Ajdovščina. It was publicly announced at the Uber Elevate Summit in Washington, D.C., United States, in June 2019. The aircraft is intended to be supplied complete and ready-to-fly.

The aircraft's designation refers to eight lift fans, no tilt rotors and one tractor propeller. It is being designed as one electric VTOL proposal for Uber Elevate.

== Design and development ==
The design uses wings as it provides greater speed and range over wingless designs, plus the ability to take off and land on a runway, if required.

The aircraft features a cantilever high-wing, a five-seat, enclosed cabin under a bubble canopy, retractable tricycle landing gear, eight vertical electric lift motors powering shrouded fans mounted in two underwing pods and a single electric motor engine in a tail-mounted tractor configuration. It will be capable of flying on six of the eight lift fans.

The design incorporates fly-by-wire controls and will be capable of autonomous flight (flight without a pilot) from delivery. The design incorporates the ability to see-and-avoid other aircraft and emphasizes a low noise signature for acceptance in urban areas.

The design used in-house designed batteries, with four of varying designs to avoid design flaws. It also used energy-absorbing seats and seat belts. Also each of the eight lift fans operates at a different rpm and therefore frequency to reduce noise pitch peaking.

The aircraft will have a range of 60 mi (97 km) at a cruising speed of 175 mph (282 km/h) or more.

== Specifications (801) ==
Data from AvWeb

General characteristics

- Crew: none
- Capacity: five passengers
- Powerplant: 1 × tail-mounted electric motor
- Powerplant: 8 × vertical lift electric motor ducted fans
- Propellers: 5-bladed tractor configuration propeller

Performance

- Maximum speed: 282 km/h (175 mph, 152 kn)
- Range: 97 km (60 mi, 52 nmi)

== See also ==
- List of electric aircraft
