= Pipistrel Taurus =

Slovenian self-launched two-seat microlight glider

Taurus
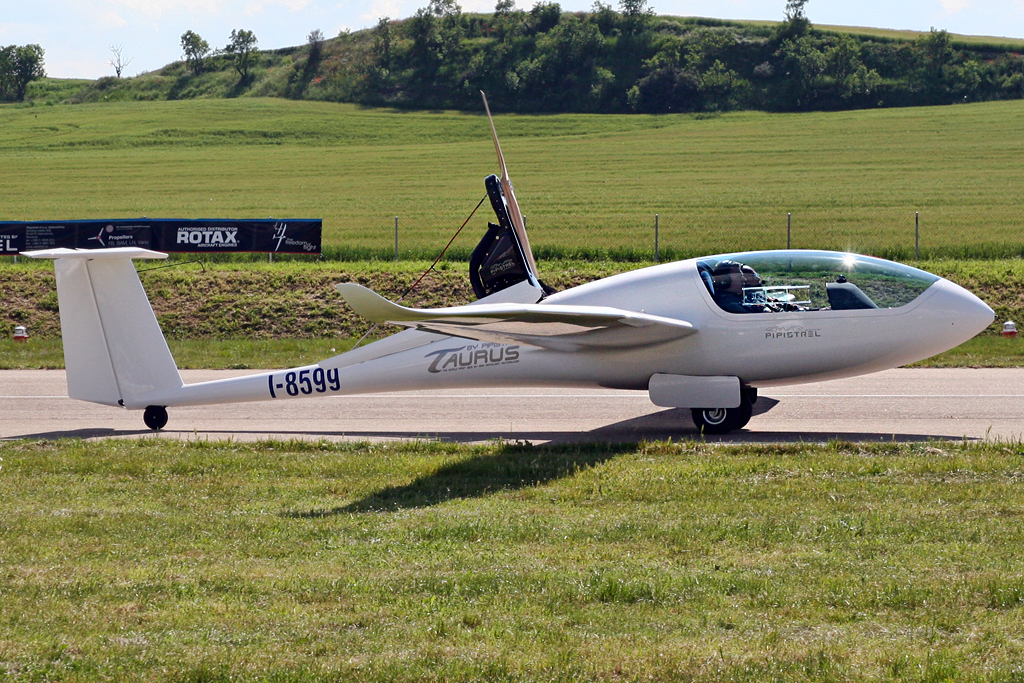

General information
- Type: Self-launching sailplane
- National origin: Slovenia
- Manufacturer: Pipistrel
- Status: In production

History
- Manufactured: 2002–present
- First flight: 2004
- Variant: DLR HY4

The Pipistrel Taurus is a Slovenian self-launched two-seat microlight glider designed and built by Pipistrel.

The Taurus Electro was announced in 2007, and entered into service in 2011, becoming the first electric 2-seat aircraft in serial production available on the market.

== Development ==
In June 2001, Pipistrel began the development of the Taurus as one of the first self-launched gliders in the microlight category. The design used the wings of the Pipistrel Sinus with a new two-seat side-by-side fuselage. To enable the Taurus to self-launch, a pop-out propeller is mounted on the rear fuselage driven by a Rotax 503 piston engine. In 2007 the company developed the Taurus Electro with the piston engine replaced by a permanent magnet synchronous three-phase brushless motor.

By 2011, Pipistrel had delivered 100 aircraft of the Taurus family.

== Operational history ==
In 2010, the Taurus Electro was awarded the gold medal at the Slovenian Biennale of Design (Bienale industrijskega oblikovanja) BIO 22 "due to its supreme beauty and advanced technologies (...) in a design where form truly follows function in the most aesthetically pleasing way".

In AERO Friedrichshafen 2011, the Taurus Electro received the Lindbergh Electric Aircraft Prize for "best electric aircraft". The prize recognized the Electro's “plug and play” electric power system, enhanced by solar panels on the aircraft trailer that allow the system to recharge using clean energy.

In September 2011, the Taurus G4 won the CAFE Foundation's Green Flight Challenge, covering 403.5 passenger miles per gallon gasoline equivalent with two people on board, and receiving the $1.35 million prize donated by NASA.

== Variants ==
Taurus M (Taurus 503)
Original variant powered by a Rotax 503 pop-up internal combustion engine. Since the discontinuation of the Rotax 503, the model has been marketed as Taurus M, but still equipped with the remaining original engines.
Taurus PureGlider
Unpowered variant without engine fitted. It flew for the first time in 2006.
Taurus Electro
Variant with a Sinedon 40 hp (30 kW) electric motor replacing the piston engine; first flown in December 2007. Pipistrel claims it was the first two-seat electric aircraft to have ever flown. Two units were produced.
Taurus Electro G2
Updated version of the Electro for series production, introduced in 2011. Powered by a 40 kW (54 hp) electric motor and lithium batteries. Powered endurance is 17 minutes, intending to allow for self-launching to an altitude of 2,000 m (6,600 ft), after which the engine is retracted and the aircraft then soars as a sailplane. It is the first two-seat electric aircraft to have achieved series production.

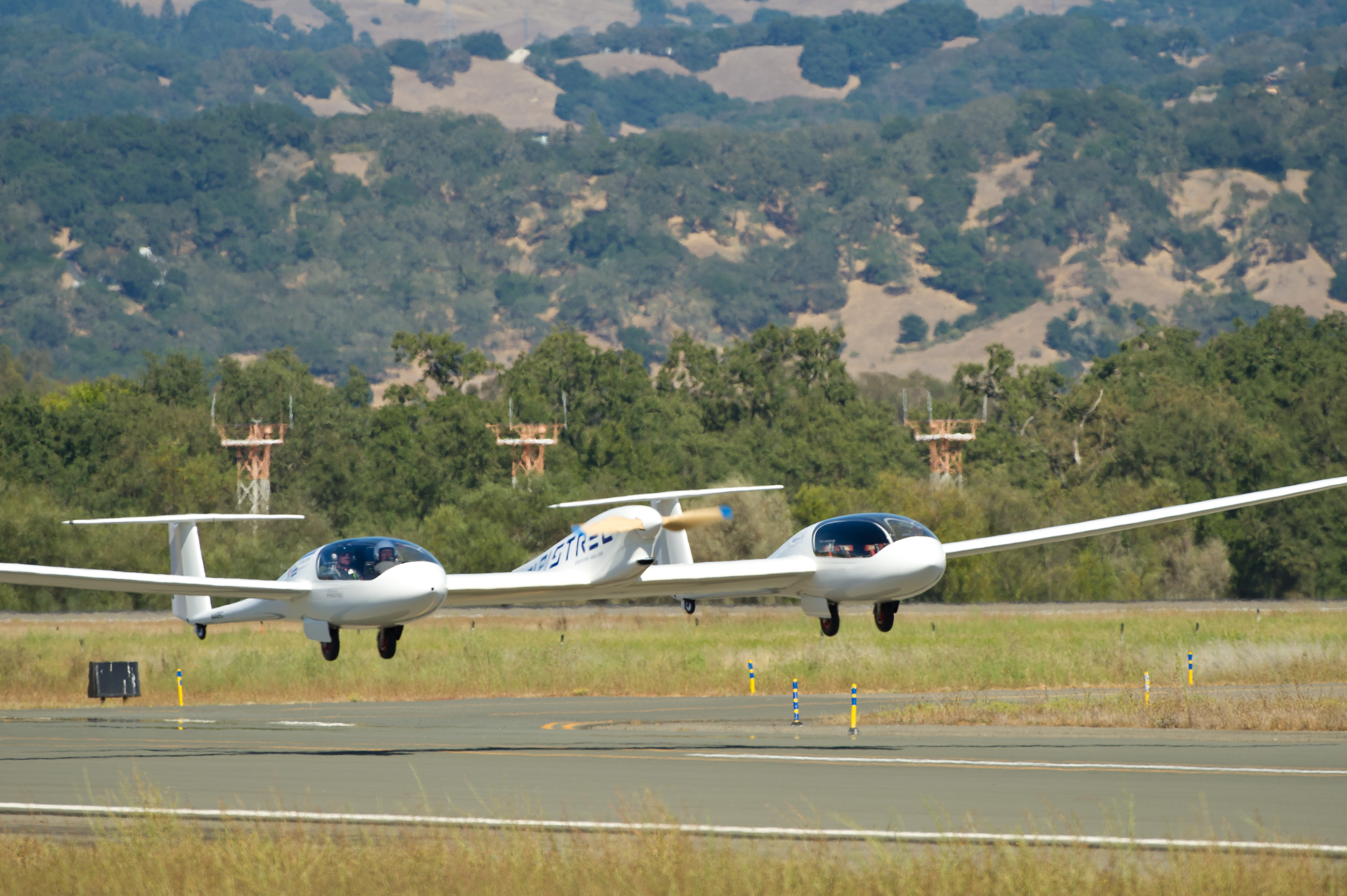
The Taurus G4 taking off from the Sonoma County Airport in California

Taurus G4
One-off twin fuselage, four seat version, based on the Taurus Electro and acting as an engine development test bed for their forthcoming Panthera four seat hybrid. It has a 150 kW (201 hp) motor mounted on the central wing section between the fuselages.
Taurus HY4
Within the EU-funded Hypstair program over three years till 2016 and followed by Mahepa project from 2017, EU-funded over four years, the dual-fuselage, four-seat, battery-powered G4 received a DLR hydrogen fuel cell powertrain to fly as the HY4 in September 2016, with hydrogen tanks and batteries in the fuselages, fuel cells and motor in the central nacelle. Partners are German motor and inverter developer Compact Dynamics, Ulm University, TU Delft, Politecnico di Milano and University of Maribor. In September 2023, the HY4, operated by DLR spinoff H2Fly, completed the world's first piloted flights of an electric plane powered by liquid hydrogen, with one flight lasting over three hours.

== Specifications (Taurus M) ==
Data from Manufacturer

General characteristics

- Crew: one
- Capacity: two (crew plus one passenger)
- Length: 7.30 m (23 ft 11 in)
- Wingspan: 14.97 m (49 ft 1 in)
- Height: 1.41 m (4 ft 8 in) (2.70 m, propeller extended)
- Wing area: 12.33 m^{2} (132.7 sq ft)
- Aspect ratio: 18.6
- Empty weight: 285 kg (628 lb)
- Max takeoff weight: 472.5 or 550 kg (1,042 or 1,213 lb)
- Fuel capacity: 30 litres (6.6 imp gal; 7.9 US gal)
- Powerplant: 1 × Rotax 503 two-stroke, two-cylinder piston engine, 40 kW (53 hp)
- Propellers: 2-bladed Pipistrel, 1.6 m (5 ft 3 in) diameter

Performance

- Maximum speed: 130 km/h (81 mph, 70 kn) with flaps extended
- Stall speed: 63 km/h (39 mph, 34 kn) with flaps
- Never exceed speed: 225 km/h (140 mph, 121 kn)
- Service ceiling: 3,900 m (12,800 ft)
- g limits: 5.33, -2.65
- Maximum glide ratio: 41:1
- Rate of climb: 2.9 m/s (570 ft/min)
- Rate of sink: 0.7 m/s (140 ft/min)

== See also ==
Related lists

- List of sailplanes
