= Pipistrel Sinus =

Type of aircraft

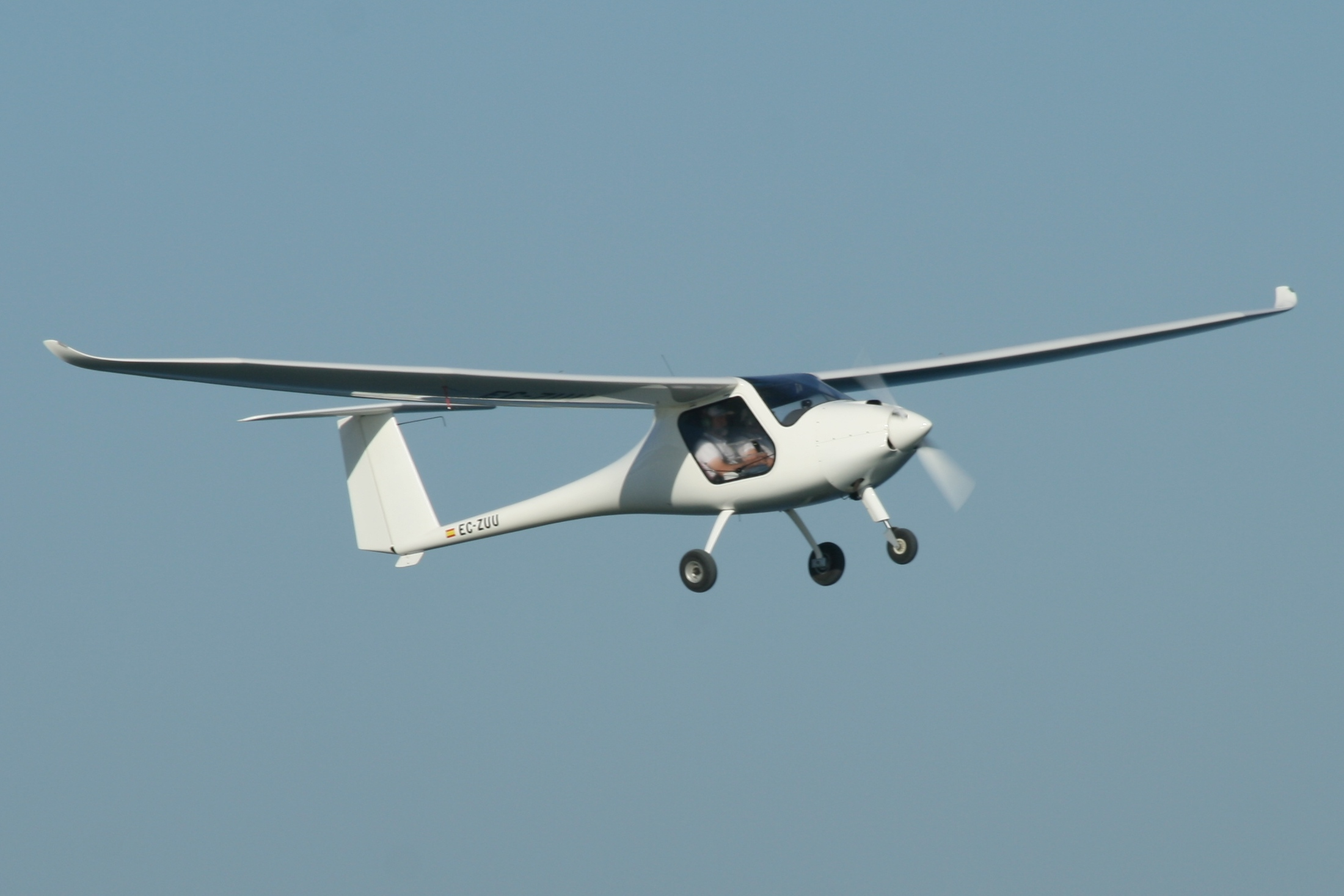

General information
- Type: Ultralight Aircraft
- National origin: Slovenia
- Manufacturer: Pipistrel
- Number built: 1000 (Sinus and Virus family total, March 2019)

History
- Manufactured: 1995–present
- First flight: October 16, 1996
- Developed into: Pipistrel Virus

The Pipistrel Sinus is a two-seat, single-engine ultralight motor glider, developed and manufactured by Pipistrel in Slovenia and Italy. Its design has served as the base for future Pipistrel developments such as the Virus and Alpha Trainer.

Introduced in 1995, the Sinus has been produced in a number of variants with different engines and undercarriage configurations. It has good STOL characteristics and it can be equipped with a full airframe emergency recovery parachute system.

== Development ==
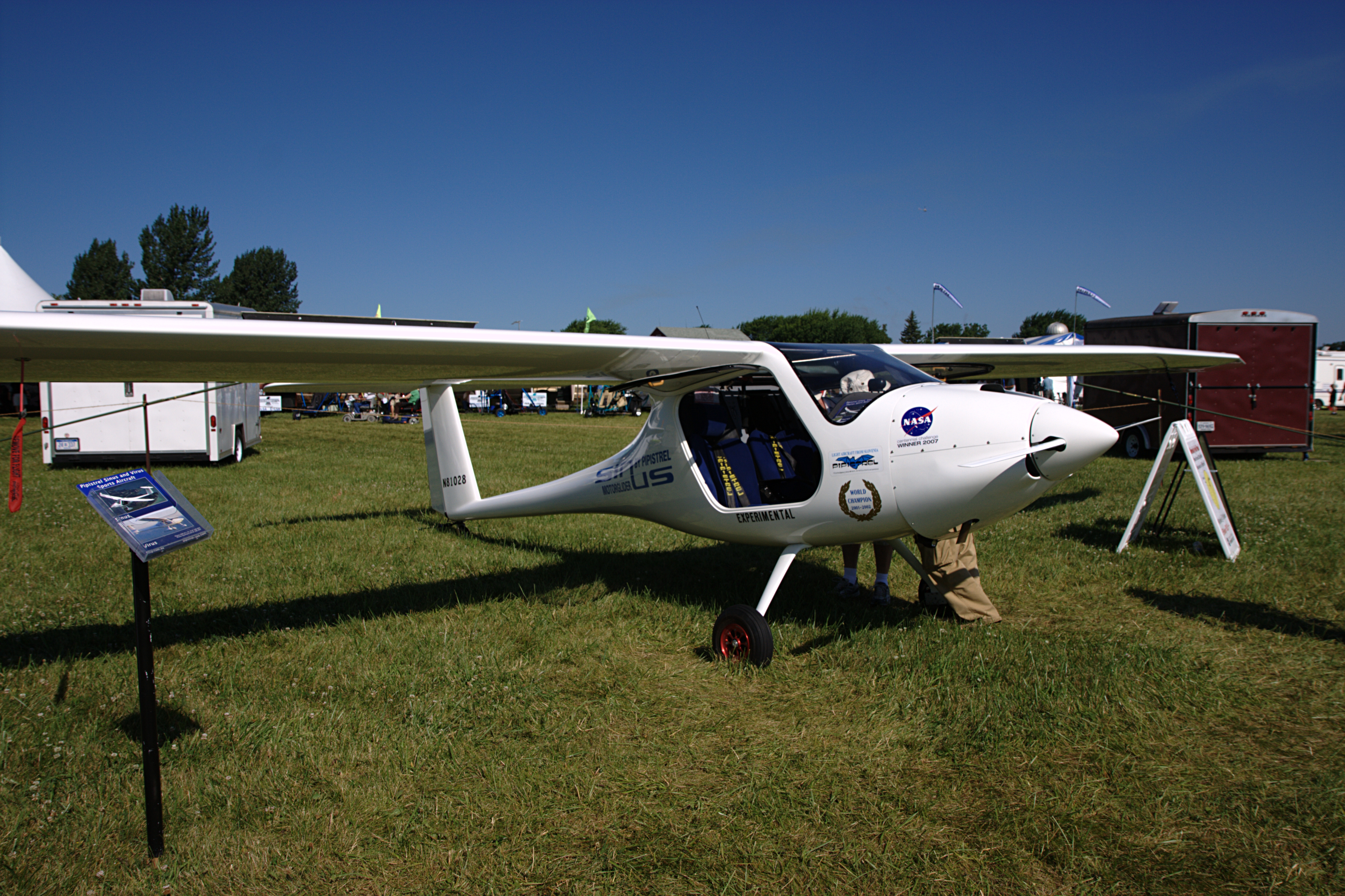
Taildragger configuration

The development of the Sinus began in November 1994 in close collaboration with the Slovenian firm Albastar Ltd. The wing and fuselage were designed by the Italian aerodynamicist Franco Orlando. In April 1995, the Sinus was unveiled at AERO Friedrichshafen, the main European general aviation trade show. The first flight of the prototype took place on October 16, 1996.

The Sinus has served as the base for the design of future Pipistrel models such as the Virus, which shares the same fuselage and tail, but sports a shorter wing. Both models are usually marketed together as a family of aircraft. The Pipistrel Taurus two-seat motorglider uses the same 15 m (49 ft) wing as the Sinus.

In 2013, Pipistrel started offering the Sinus Flex model, which is a standard Sinus with two interchangeable wingtip sets. The outer section of the wing can be replaced by a shorter part consisting of the winglet of the Virus model, converting the aircraft from motor glider to sport cruiser in minutes. The manufacturer states that the shorter wingtips turn the Sinus into the short-winged, faster-cruising, and easier-to-store Virus model, although there are some slight differences between the two models other than the wings. The Flex wings can be retrofitted to any other Sinus model.

By April 2003, Pipistrel had already produced 100 aircraft of the Sinus/Virus family. This number reached 1000 units by March 2019.

== Design ==
The Sinus is a two-seat, ultra-light, high-wing, cantilever monoplane. It is primarily built from composite materials and is capable of soaring. The variable-pitch propeller (Pipistrel VARIO) can be feathered in order to diminish the air resistance in non-powered flight.

The Pipistrel Sinus comes with either nose-wheel or taildragger landing gear. Engine models available are the Rotax 503, 582 and 912.

== Operational history ==
In 2001, Philippe Zen and Thomas Knowles flew a Sinus at the World Air Games in Spain and won first place in the two-seat category.

In 2004, Matevž Lenarčič flew a modified Sinus around the world in 79 days, setting several world records.

In May, 2019, Aarohi Pandit became the first woman to fly across the Atlantic Ocean in an ultralight aircraft, in a Sinus 912 named "Mahi." In August, 2019, she also became the first woman to fly across the Pacific Ocean in a light sport aircraft.

== Variants ==
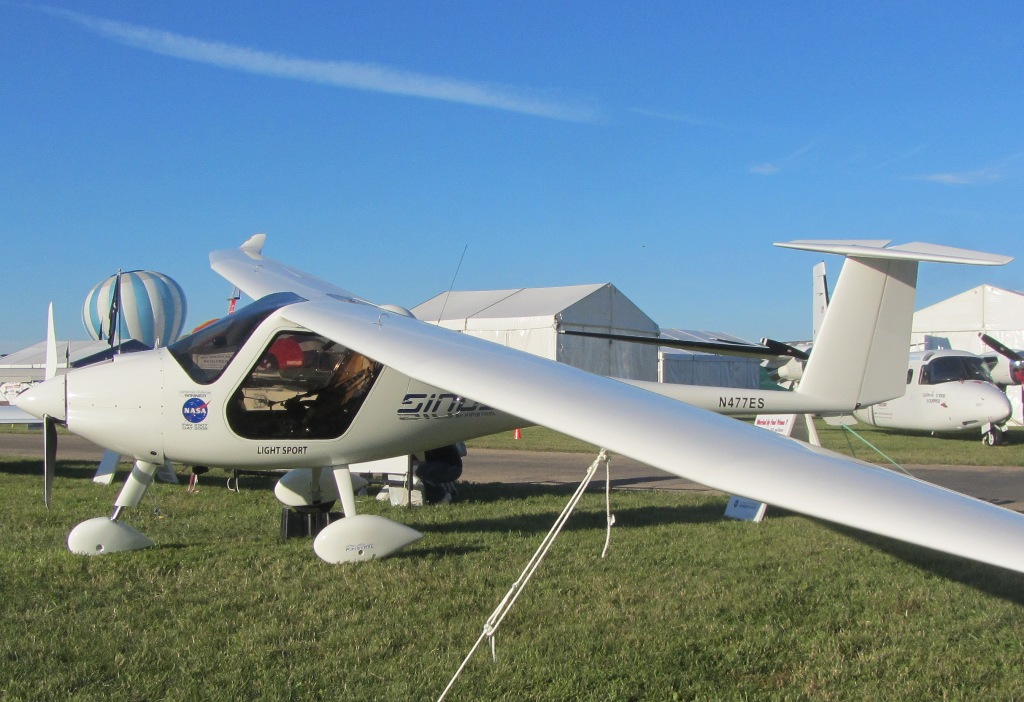
Pipistrel Sinus 912

Sinus 447
Rotax 447 powered variant for the Slovenian market.
Sinus 503
Rotax 503 powered variant with a variable-pitch folding propeller.
Sinus 582
As the 503 but fitted with a Rotax 582.
Sinus 912
Rotax 912 powered variant in either UL, LSA or experimental version.
Sinus FLEX
Sinus 912 variant with interchangeable shorter wingtips.
RQ-29 LEA
Long endurance reconnaissance unmanned aerial vehicle, developed by Technology Service Corporation for Long Endurance Aircraft Program of United States Special Operations Command. Based on Sinus 912 and has endurance of at least 24 hours with full payload.

== Specifications (Sinus 912) ==
Data from Manufacturer

General characteristics

- Crew: one
- Capacity: one passenger
- Length: 6.60 m (21 ft 8 in)
- Wingspan: 14.97 m (49 ft 1 in)
- Height: 1.70 m (5 ft 7 in)
- Wing area: 12.26 m^{2} (132.0 sq ft)
- Aspect ratio: 18.3
- Empty weight: 285 kg (628 lb)
- Max takeoff weight: 450 or 472.5 or 600 kg (992 or 1,042 or 1,323 lb)
- Fuel capacity: 60 litres (13 imp gal; 16 US gal) or 100 litres (22 imp gal; 26 US gal)
- Powerplant: 1 × Rotax 912 UL2 , 4-cylinder, 4-stroke liquid-cooled engine, 60 kW (80 hp)
- Propellers: 2-bladed , variable pitch, Pipistrel VARIO

Performance

- Maximum speed: 220 km/h (140 mph, 120 kn)
- Cruise speed: 200 km/h (120 mph, 110 kn) at 75% power
- Stall speed: 66 km/h (41 mph, 36 kn) without flaps
- Never exceed speed: 225 km/h (140 mph, 121 kn)
- Range: 1,200 km (750 mi, 650 nmi)
- Endurance: 5.8 hours
- Service ceiling: 8,800 m (28,900 ft)
- g limits: +4, -2
- Maximum glide ratio: 27:1
- Rate of climb: 6.5 m/s (1,280 ft/min)

== See also ==
Related development

- Pipistrel Virus
- Pipistrel Alpha Trainer

Aircraft of comparable role, configuration, and era

- Diamond HK36 Super Dimona
- Grob G 109
