= Pipistrel Virus =

1999 light aircraft

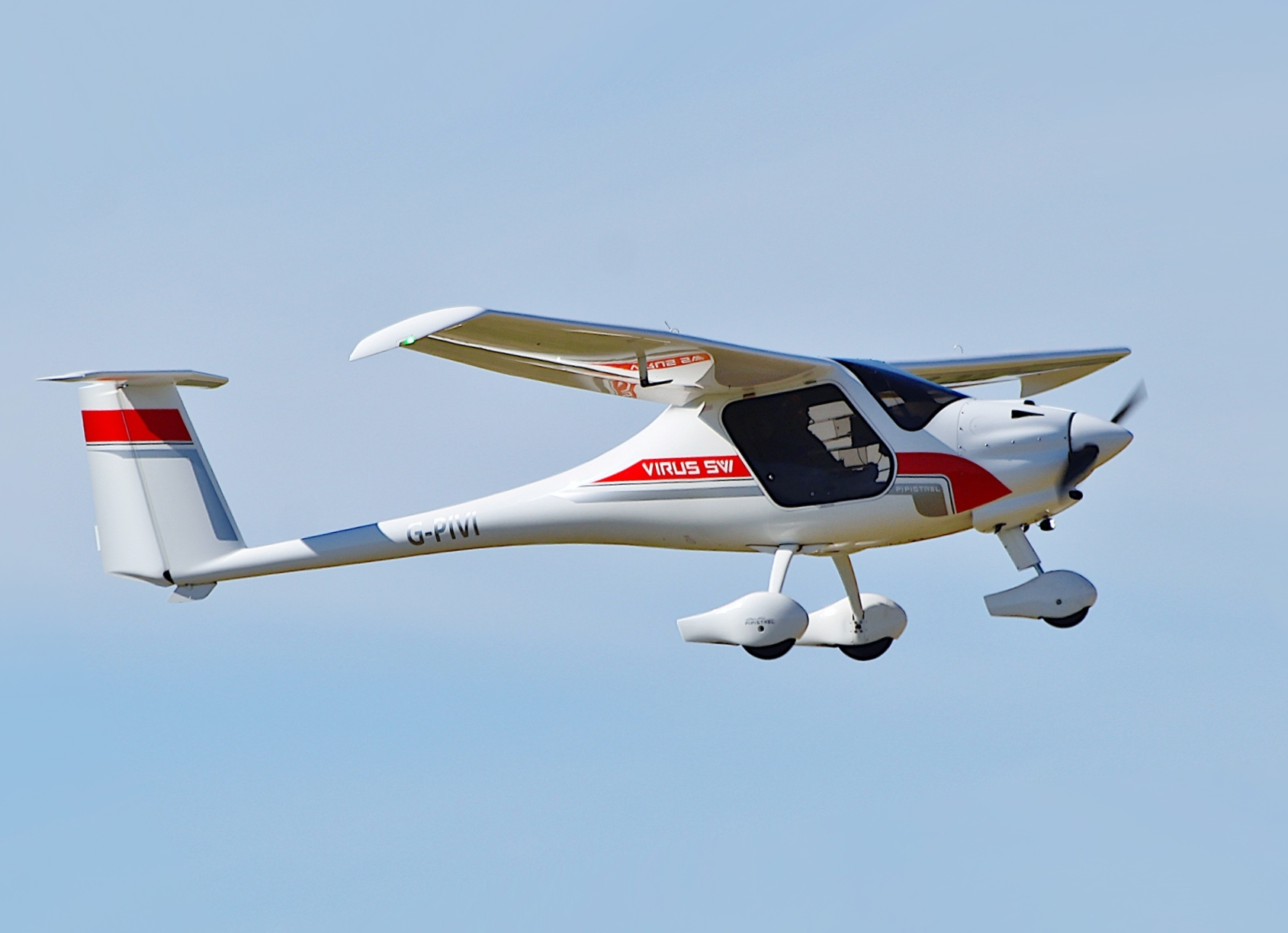

General information
- Type: General aviation aircraft
- National origin: Slovenia
- Manufacturer: Pipistrel
- Status: In production
- Number built: 1000 (Sinus and Virus family total, March 2019)

History
- Manufactured: 1999-present
- First flight: August 10, 1999
- Developed from: Pipistrel Sinus
- Variant: Pipistrel Velis Electro

The Pipistrel Virus is a two-seat, single engine light aircraft manufactured by Pipistrel in Slovenia and Italy and sold as an ultralight, homebuilt kit, glider, or light-sport aircraft.

Introduced in 1999 and based on the design of the Pipistrel Sinus, the Virus has been produced in a number of variants with different engines, wingspans, and undercarriage configurations. It can be equipped with a full airframe emergency recovery parachute system.

== Design and development ==
The Virus is a high-wing, cantilever monoplane of pod-and-boom configuration with a T-tail and air brakes. The cabin has two seats side-by-side. Its fixed undercarriage can be provided in either tricycle or tailwheel configuration. The aircraft is available in long wing version (12.5-metre wingspan), powered by an 80 hp (60 kW) Rotax 912 engine, or in short wing "SW" version (10.7-metre wingspan), equipped with several options of Rotax 912 and 914 engines.

The Virus SW 121 and Explorer (SW 121A) line of aircraft are rated for intentional spins.

Aviation journalist Paul Bertorelli has criticized the aircraft's design for lack of cabin occupant crashworthiness. However, the manufacturer points out that this kind of issue is typical of aircraft in the LSA category. The design has no history of head trauma during the accidents that have occurred.

By February 2014, Pipistrel had produced more than 600 Sinus/Virus aircraft. Production reached 1000 aircraft by March 2019.

In April 2016, the Virus SW 121 received an EASA Full Type Certificate. The SW 121 is powered by a Rotax 912 S3 and is designed to meet EASA requirements for a Light Sports Aeroplane. It is the first EASA type-certified (no restrictions, category "normal") aircraft in CS-LSA category for Night VFR operations, intentional spins and glider-towing. It features an autopilot, dual redundant ADAHRS units, and airbrakes.

In January 2022, Pipistrel announced a new variant of the SW 121, commercially referred to as Explorer. The new variant, also EASA CS-LSA type-certified, features new Garmin G3X Touch touch-screen avionics and a haptic stall warning system, among other equipment.

== Operational history ==
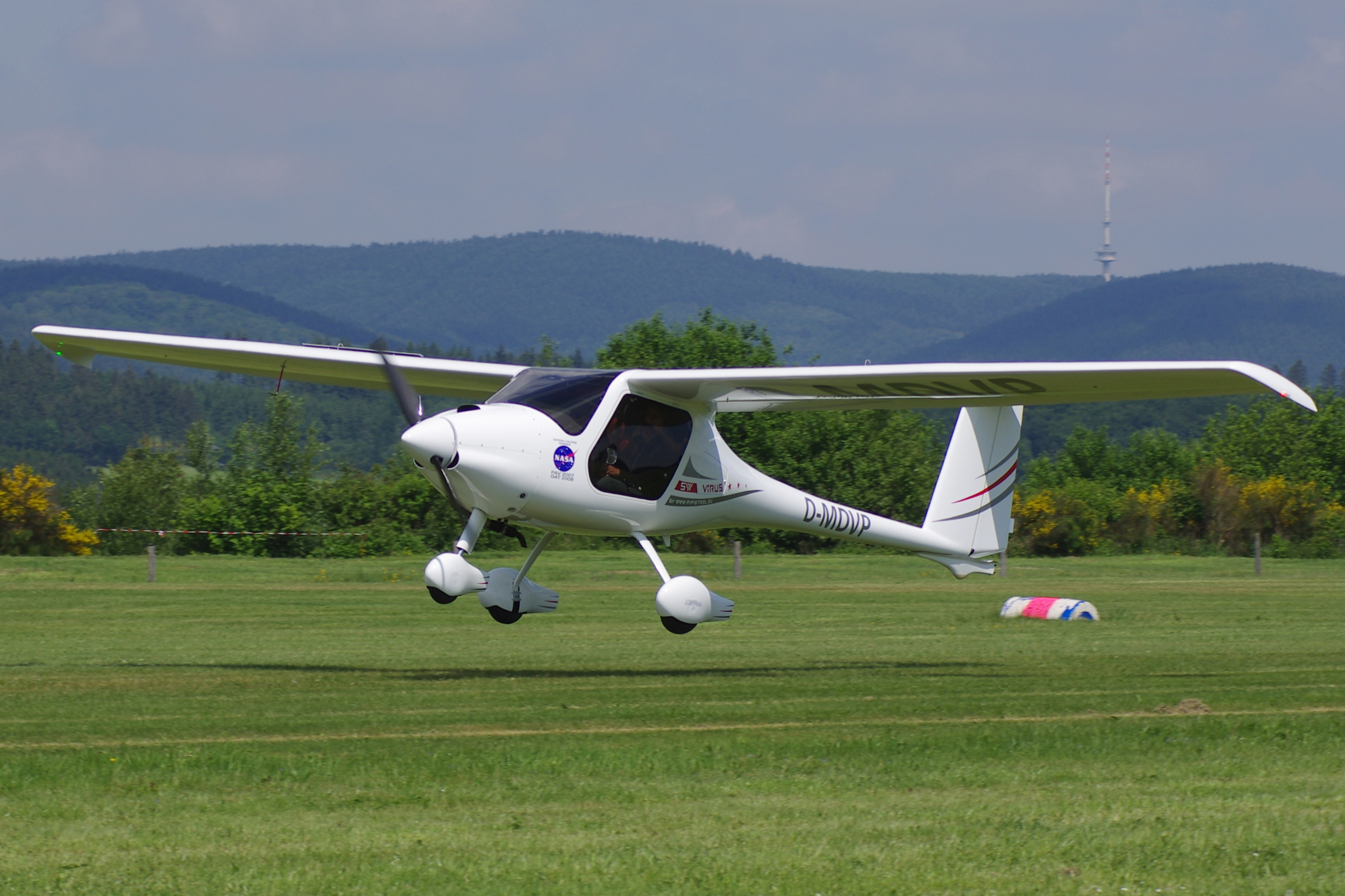
Pipistrel Virus SW

The Pipistrel Virus flew for the first time on August 10, 1999. Production began on January 20, 2000.

The development of the short wing version started in 2007. The Virus SW production started in 2008.

The Virus won the NASA 2007 Personal Air Vehicle (PAV) Challenge and the 2008 General Aviation Technology (GAT) Challenge.

On 8 January 2012, Slovenian pilot Matevž Lenarčič launched an around-the-world flight attempt from Slovenia in a turbocharged Virus SW914, sponsored as the GreenLight World Flight. As part of his flight, he flew past Mount Everest at an altitude of 8,944 m (29,344 ft), some 90 m (300 ft) above the peak's height; this portion of the journey was not authorized, as Nepal had cancelled his permit to make the flight right before he took off. He completed the flight on 19 April 2012, returning to Slovenia and claiming to be the first person to complete such a flight without a copilot. He flew 100,000 km (62,000 miles) during the journey.

On 12 October 2015, Pipistrel won an international tender issued by the Indian Ministry of Defence, to supply 194 light trainers to the National Cadet Corps (110 aircraft), Indian Air Force (72 aircraft), and Indian Navy (12 aircraft). The two-seat Pipistrel Virus SW 80 aircraft, known as the Garud after a bird in Hindu mythology, would be used for training of Flight Safety and Air Wing Cadets. By September 2019, all 194 aircraft had been delivered. On 21 January 2026, around 12:15 IST, one of the aircraft of the Indian Air Force undertook a forced controlled emergency parachute landing during a regular sortie from Air Force Station Bamruali. Both the pilots were safe and no injuries or property damage has been reported. Emergency teams had been dispatched and an investigation in underway. The aircrew experienced an engine failure while in-flight. The aircraft was being operated by Group Captain Praveen Agarwal, VM, Chief Operating Officer of Air Force Station Bamrauli, and Group Captain Sunil Kumar Pandey, Chief Administrative Officer of the airbase. The trainer aircraft was being used to monitor bird activities around airfields.

== Variants ==
Virus 912
Initial version with 12.5-metre (41 ft) wingspan and powered by an 80 hp (60 kW) Rotax 912 UL engine.
Virus SW 80
Short wing version with 10.7-metre (35 ft) wingspan.
Virus SW 80 Garud
Special variant of the SW 80 developed for the Indian Ministry of Defence in 2015. 194 units were manufactured and delivered by September 2019.
Virus SW 100
Short wing version equipped with a more powerful 100 hp (75 kW) Rotax 912 ULS engine. The SW 100 cruises at 273 km/h (170 mph), which is 24 km/h (15 mph) faster than the long wing 80 hp (60 kW) version.
Virus SW 100 iS
Short wing version equipped with a 100 hp (75 kW) Rotax 912 iS engine with direct fuel injection and an electronic engine management unit. Fuel consumption is reduced by 13% and range is increased by 18% with respect to the SW 100.
Virus SW 115 (SW 914 Turbo)
Short wing version equipped with a 115 hp (86 kW) Rotax 914 UL turbocharged engine.
Virus SW 121
EASA type-certified model in the CS-LSA category. Short wing version powered by a 100 hp (75 kW) Rotax 912 S3 engine.
Virus SW 600 D
Based on the SW 121 but featuring a 100 hp (75 kW) Rotax 912 ULS engine, it is the first aircraft to be certified under the new German LTF-UL2019 rules for the 600 kg microlight category.
Velis Electro (Virus SW 128)
First electric aircraft to secure certification, from the EASA on 10 June 2020. Powered by a 76 hp (57 kW) electric engine developed with Emrax, it offers a payload of 170 kg, a cruise speed of 90 kn (170 km/h), and a 50 min endurance. Pipistrel plans to deliver over 30 examples in 2020, to be operated as a trainer aircraft. It has two liquid-cooled, 11 kWh, 345 V lithium-ion batteries.
Velis Club (Virus SW 121C)
Variant of the EASA CS-LSA type-certified SW 121 with similar avionics to the Velis Electro, including a haptic stall warning system.
Explorer (Virus SW 121A)
Variant of the EASA CS-LSA type-certified SW 121 with Garmin G3X Touch touch-screen avionics and a haptic stall warning system.

== Operators ==
=== Civil ===
The different versions of the Virus are flown by private individuals and flight schools worldwide.

=== Military ===
India

- Indian Air Force – 72 × SW 80 Garud
- Indian Navy – 12 × SW 80 Garud
- National Cadet Corps – 110 × SW 80 Garud

Slovenia

- Slovenian Air Force and Air Defence – 5 × Velis Electro

Denmark

- Royal Danish Air Force - 2 x Velis Electro

== Specifications (Virus 912 SW 100) ==
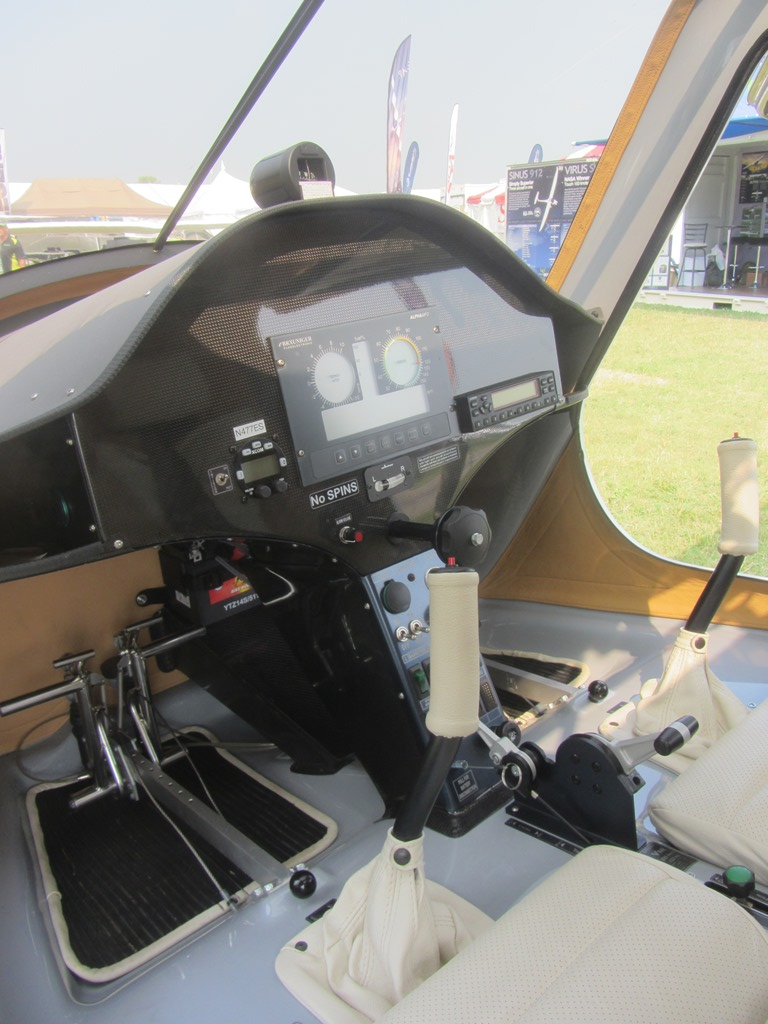
Pipistrel Virus cockpit

Data from Manufacturer

General characteristics

- Crew: one
- Capacity: one passenger
- Length: 6.5 m (21 ft 4 in)
- Wingspan: 10.71 m (35 ft 2 in)
- Height: 1.85 m (6 ft 1 in)
- Wing area: 9.51 m^{2} (102.4 sq ft)
- Aspect ratio: 11.3
- Empty weight: 289 kg (637 lb)
- Max takeoff weight: 600 kg (1,323 lb)
- Fuel capacity: 100 litres (22 imp gal; 26 US gal)
- Powerplant: 1 × Rotax 912 ULS , 75 kW (100 hp)

Performance

- Maximum speed: 283 km/h (176 mph, 153 kn)
- Cruise speed: 273 km/h (170 mph, 147 kn) at 75% power
- Stall speed: 79 km/h (49 mph, 43 kn) without flaps
- Never exceed speed: 302 km/h (188 mph, 163 kn)
- Range: 1,450 km (900 mi, 780 nmi)
- Endurance: 5.3 hours
- Service ceiling: 6,800 m (22,300 ft)
- g limits: +4/-2
- Maximum glide ratio: 17:1
- Rate of climb: 8.4 m/s (1,650 ft/min)

== See also ==
Related development

- Pipistrel Sinus
- Pipistrel Alpha Trainer

Aircraft of comparable role, configuration, and era

- Cessna 162 Skycatcher
- Tecnam P92
