= Ippesheim =

- Municipality
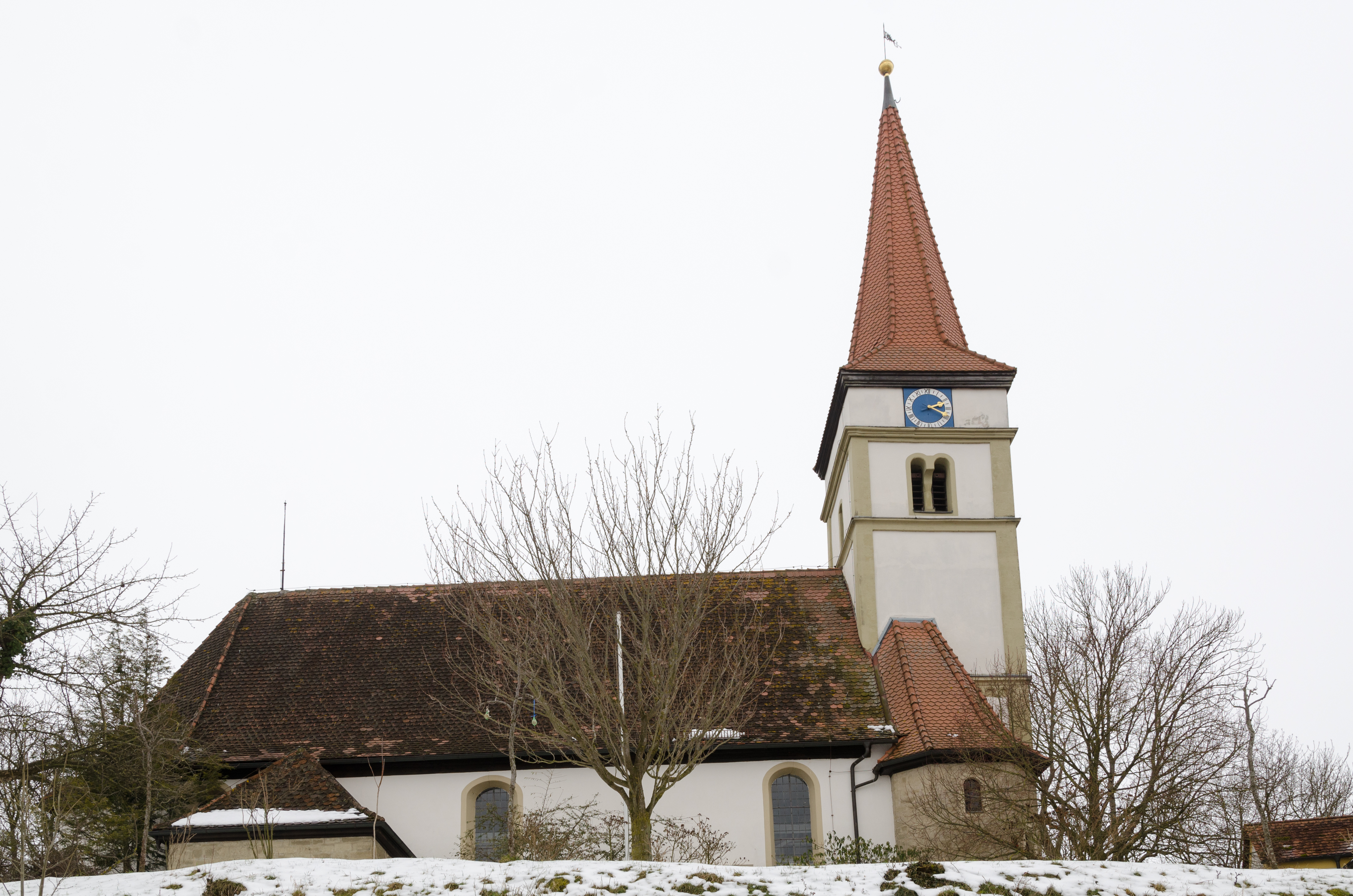
- Church in Ippesheim

- Coat of arms

- Location of Ippesheim within Neustadt a.d.Aisch-Bad Windsheim district
- Interactive map of Ippesheim
- Location within Germany Location within Bavaria
- Coordinates: 49°36′09″N 10°13′27″E
- Country: Germany
- State: Bavaria
- Admin. region: Mittelfranken
- District: Neustadt a.d.Aisch-Bad Windsheim
- Municipal assoc.: Uffenheim
- Subdivisions: 4 Ortsteile

Government
  - Mayor (2019–25): Karl Schmidt

Area
  - Total: 23.56 km^{2} (9.10 sq mi)
- Elevation: 291 m (955 ft)

Population (2025-12-31)
  - Total: 1,109
  - Density: 47.07/km^{2} (121.9/sq mi)
- Time zone: UTC+01:00 (CET)
  - Summer (DST): UTC+02:00 (CEST)
- Postal codes: 97258
- Dialling codes: 09339
- Vehicle registration: NEA
- Website: www.ippesheim.de

Ippesheim is a municipality in the district of Neustadt (Aisch)-Bad Windsheim in Bavaria in Germany.

== Personalities ==
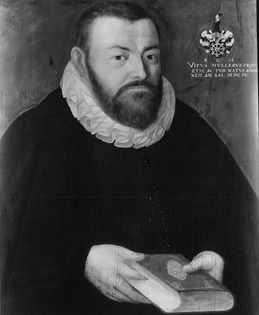
Vitus Müller (1604)

- Vitus Müller (1561–1626), Protestant theologian and philologist, professor at the University of Tübingen
