= Yokuts Valley, California =

Community in Fresno County, California

Yokuts Valley
- Unincorporated community Census-designated place
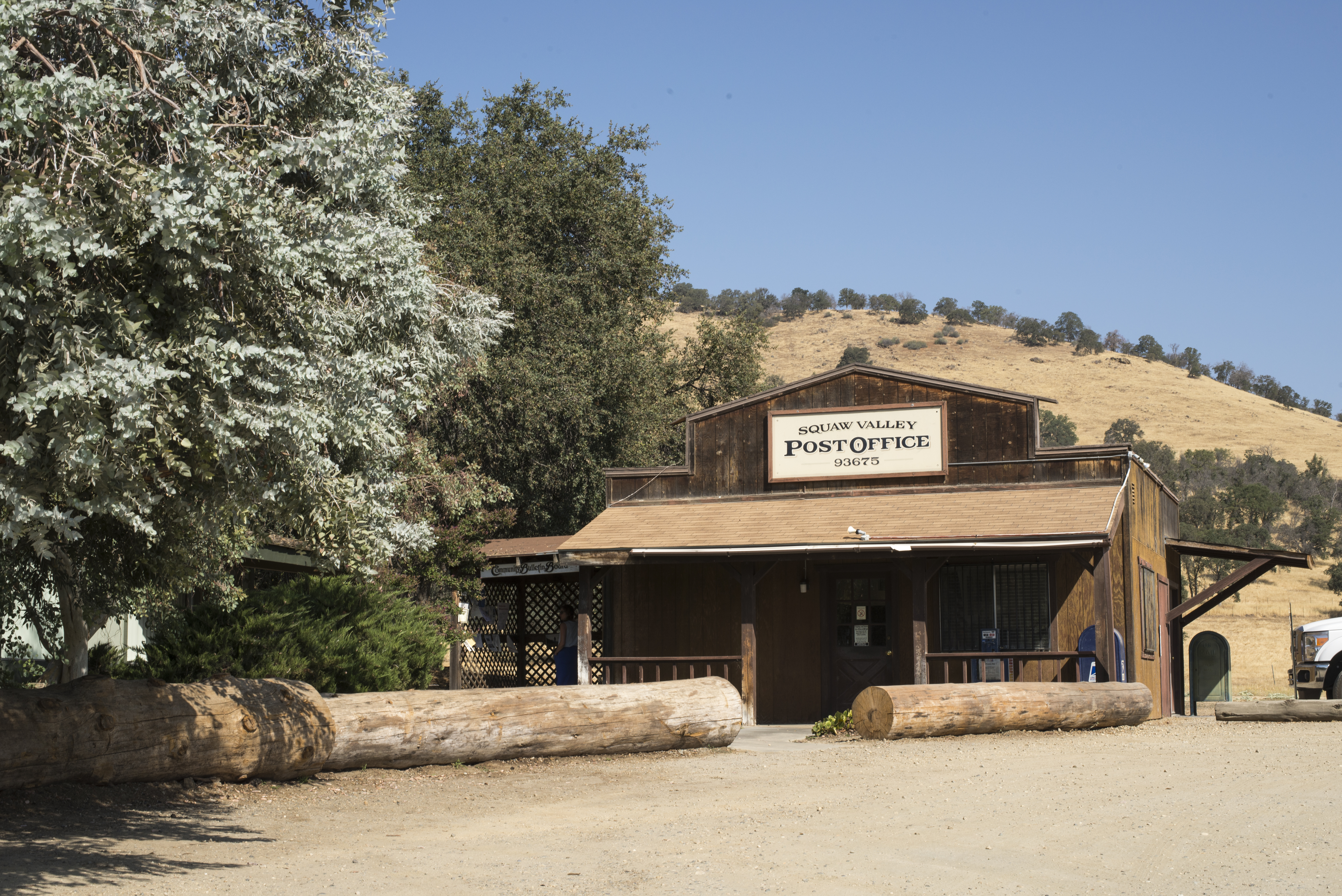
- The Post Office in Yokuts Valley in 2018, before the community's name change

- Location in Fresno County and the state of California

- Location in the United States
- Coordinates: 36°44′25″N 119°14′48″W
- Country: United States
- State: California
- County: Fresno
- Named for: The Yokuts, an Indigenous ethnic group comprising many tribes of Central California

Government
  - State Senator: Shannon Grove (R)
  - State Assembly: David Tangipa (R)
  - U. S. Congress: Vince Fong (R)

Area
  - Total: 63.669 sq mi (164.901 km^{2})
  - Land: 63.613 sq mi (164.758 km^{2})
  - Water: 0.055 sq mi (0.143 km^{2}) 0.09%
- Elevation: 1,631 ft (497 m)

Population (2020)
  - Total: 3,564
  - Density: 56.03/sq mi (21.63/km^{2})
- Time zone: UTC-8 (PST)
  - Summer (DST): UTC-7 (PDT)
- ZIP codes: 93646, 93675
- Area code: 559
- GNIS feature IDs: 1659853, 2408799

Yokuts Valley (formerly Squaw Valley) is an unincorporated community located in Fresno County, California, United States, at the foothills of the Sierra Nevada on State Route 180, just below Kings Canyon National Park.

As of the 2020 census, the CDP had a total population of 3,564, up from 3,162 at the 2010 census. For statistical purposes, the United States Census Bureau defined Squaw Valley as a census-designated place (CDP). Yokuts Valley is located 9 miles (14 km) north-northeast of Orange Cove and 30 miles (48 km) east of Fresno, at an elevation of 1,631 ft (497 m).

== Name ==
The Chukimena, the Yokuts tribe that occupied the valley before American colonization, named it Múshtihnau, after their main village in the valley. The nearby Éntimbits Yokuts tribe called the valley, Túcheu, a name that the Chukimena used for one of their other villages in the valley.

The label "Valley" originally referred to either the surrounding basin or a narrow valley that connects it to the San Joaquin Valley. Today it refers to both. The basin may have originally been named "Woman's Land", after a depression in a rock overlooking the valley that resembles a woman's moccasin print. By 1873, non-native hunters adapted the name in English to "Squaw Valley", because "squaw" was the term used by white settlers for Indigenous women; it is considered a slur by natives. The United States Board on Geographic Names (BGN) officially assigned the name "Squaw Valley" to the community in 1957 and to the basin in 1959.

On August 28, 1958, at the behest of Representative B. F. Sisk, the BGN decided that "Squaw Valley" would only refer to this community, not to a newer community in Placer County that was about to host the 1960 Winter Olympics. The latter would become known as Olympic Valley. Nevertheless, the name "Squaw Valley" continued to refer informally to both communities, creating considerable confusion.

From 2020 to 2023, a coalition that included members of local tribes petitioned the Fresno County Board of Supervisors to rename the community "Nuum Valley" and later "Yokuts Valley", citing the derogatory history of the town's previous name.

In September 2022, the Board on Geographic Names renamed the surrounding valley to Yokuts Basin as part of a program to remove "squaw" from geographical names across the country. A Fresno County Supervisor, Republican Nathan Magsig, solicited feedback from 1,400 households about the proposed renaming and says they prefer Bear Valley. He organized a town hall meeting with local activists that turned contentious. Arguments against the name change ranged from procedural to political. Some opposed it simply for the fact that the new name had not been chosen by residents, ironic to the native tribes who still live in the area. Others refused to accept that the word "squaw" is considered derogatory by others. Arguments in favor of the change came from Native activists and white residents of the town who wanted their home cleared of a name that degraded Indigenous women.

A few days later, Governor Gavin Newsom signed a law directing state and local authorities to remove "squaw" from geographic features and place names throughout the state, including "Squaw Valley", by 2025. In October, the Fresno County Board of Supervisors passed a resolution that acknowledged the state and federal renaming efforts while notifying the federal government that 87% of households that responded to Supervisor Magsig's survey opposed renaming the community.

In January 2023, the Board on Geographic Names completed additional review on renaming the unincorporated populated place to "Yokuts Valley." In February, a prominent welcome sign bearing the previous name was removed, prompting some local residents to call for its restoration.

== History ==
Present-day Yokuts Valley was originally the home of Yokuts and Mono people. In 1869, the Simpson Drake family became the first recorded non-Indigenous family to settle in the basin. An early reference to Yokuts Valley as "Squaw Valley" appears in the May 22, 1884 issue of the Lewiston Teller, a North Idaho newspaper.

The first post office opened in "Squaw Valley" in 1879. It was renamed Squawvalley in 1895 before closing in 1918. It reopened in 1923, renamed back to Squaw Valley in 1932, and closed again in 1945 in favor of the nearby Orange Cove post office. The "Squaw Valley" post office was established a third time in 1960.

In the 1960s, the community moved east to its current location. In 1994, the Fresno County Public Library's Bear Mountain Branch Library relocated to the community from Dunlap, where it had been since 1915.

== Geography ==
The community is located in the Yokuts Basin. According to the United States Census Bureau, the CDP has a total area of 63.7 square miles (165.0 km^{2}), of which over 99% is land. The Squaw Valley-Miramonte AVA grape-growing region is centered around the community.

== Demographics ==
Historical population
Census	Pop.	Note	%±
1990	2,161		—
2000	2,691		24.5%
2010	3,162		17.5%
2020	3,564		12.7%
U.S. Decennial Census; 1860–1870 1880-1890; 1900 1910 1920; 1930 1940 1950; 1960 1970 1980; 1990 2000 2010; 2020

Yokuts Valley first appeared as a census designated place under the name Squaw Valley in the 1980 United States census. It was renamed Yokuts Valley after the 2020 U.S. census.

=== 2020 ===
Yokuts Valley CDP, California – Racial and ethnic composition Note: the US Census treats Hispanic/Latino as an ethnic category. This table excludes Latinos from the racial categories and assigns them to a separate category. Hispanics/Latinos may be of any race.
Race / Ethnicity (NH = Non-Hispanic)	Pop 2000	Pop 2010	Pop 2020	% 2000	% 2010	% 2020
White alone (NH)	2,213	2,416	2,413	82.24%	76.41%	67.70%
Black or African American alone (NH)	36	29	21	1.34%	0.92%	0.59%
Native American or Alaska Native alone (NH)	52	50	53	1.93%	1.58%	1.49%
Asian alone (NH)	13	44	96	0.48%	1.39%	2.69%
Native Hawaiian or Pacific Islander alone (NH)	0	1	0	0.00%	0.03%	0.00%
Other race alone (NH)	5	0	21	0.19%	0.00%	0.59%
Mixed race or Multiracial (NH)	45	97	210	1.67%	3.07%	5.89%
Hispanic or Latino (any race)	327	525	750	12.15%	16.60%	21.04%
Total	2,691	3,162	3,564	100.00%	100.00%	100.00%

The 2020 United States census reported that Yokuts Valley had a population of 3,564. The population density was 56.0 inhabitants per square mile (21.6/km^{2}). The racial makeup of Yokuts Valley was 72.3% White, 0.7% African American, 2.3% Native American, 2.9% Asian, 0.0% Pacific Islander, 8.3% from other races, and 13.6% from two or more races. Hispanic or Latino of any race were 21.0% of the population.

The census reported that 99.7% of the population lived in households, 0.3% lived in non-institutionalized group quarters, and no one was institutionalized.

There were 1,398 households, out of which 22.8% included children under the age of 18, 52.3% were married-couple households, 5.7% were cohabiting couple households, 19.4% had a female householder with no partner present, and 22.7% had a male householder with no partner present. 26.5% of households were one person, and 13.6% were one person aged 65 or older. The average household size was 2.54. There were 948 families (67.8% of all households).

The age distribution was 19.0% under the age of 18, 6.2% aged 18 to 24, 20.1% aged 25 to 44, 30.4% aged 45 to 64, and 24.3% who were 65 years of age or older. The median age was 49.7 years. For every 100 females, there were 113.9 males.

There were 1,636 housing units at an average density of 25.7 units per square mile (9.9 units/km^{2}), of which 1,398 (85.5%) were occupied. Of these, 84.9% were owner-occupied, and 15.1% were occupied by renters.

In 2023, the US Census Bureau estimated that the median household income was $81,094, and the per capita income was $35,815. About 12.4% of families and 15.0% of the population were below the poverty line.

=== 2010 ===
At the 2010 census Yokuts Valley had a population of 3,162. The population density was 55.9 inhabitants per square mile (21.6/km^{2}). The racial makeup of Yokuts Valley was 2,700 (85.4%) White, 30 (0.9%) African American, 77 (2.4%) Native American, 47 (1.5%) Asian, 2 (0.1%) Pacific Islander, 159 (5.0%) from other races, and 147 (4.6%) from two or more races. Hispanic or Latino of any race were 525 people (16.6%).

The census reported that 3,160 people (99.9% of the population) lived in households, 2 (0.1%) lived in non-institutionalized group quarters, and no one was institutionalized.

There were 1,188 households, 343 (28.9%) had children under the age of 18 living in them, 715 (60.2%) were married couples living together, 101 (8.5%) had a female householder with no husband present, 66 (5.6%) had a male householder with no wife present. There were 75 (6.3%) unmarried opposite-sex partnerships, and 7 (0.6%) same-sex married couples or partnerships. 239 households (20.1%) were one person and 99 (8.3%) had someone living alone who was 65 or older. The average household size was 2.66. There were 882 families (74.2% of households); the average family size was 3.01.

The age distribution was 709 people (22.4%) under the age of 18, 200 people (6.3%) aged 18 to 24, 597 people (18.9%) aged 25 to 44, 1,111 people (35.1%) aged 45 to 64, and 545 people (17.2%) who were 65 or older. The median age was 46.3 years. For every 100 females, there were 103.2 males. For every 100 females age 18 and over, there were 99.9 males.

There were 1,419 housing units at an average density of 25.1 units per square mile (9.7 units/km^{2}), of which 1,188 were occupied, 1,009 (84.9%) by the owners and 179 (15.1%) by renters. The homeowner vacancy rate was 3.6%; the rental vacancy rate was 5.7%. 2,648 people (83.7% of the population) lived in owner-occupied housing units and 512 people (16.2%) lived in rental housing units.

== Government ==
As an unincorporated community, Yokuts Valley lacks a local government. Instead, Fresno County service areas and special districts serve the area. Along with much of eastern Fresno County, Yokuts Valley is located in Supervisorial District 5. The Kings Canyon Unified School District serves Fresno County's mountain areas including Yokuts Valley. The Fresno County Sheriff's Office maintains a substation in Yokuts Valley.

== Education ==
Most of the CDP is served by the Kings Canyon Joint Unified School District; portions are within the Cutler-Orosi Joint Unified School District.

== Notable people ==
- Stuart Erwin – actor
- Don Knight – actor
