= Reedley Municipal Airport =

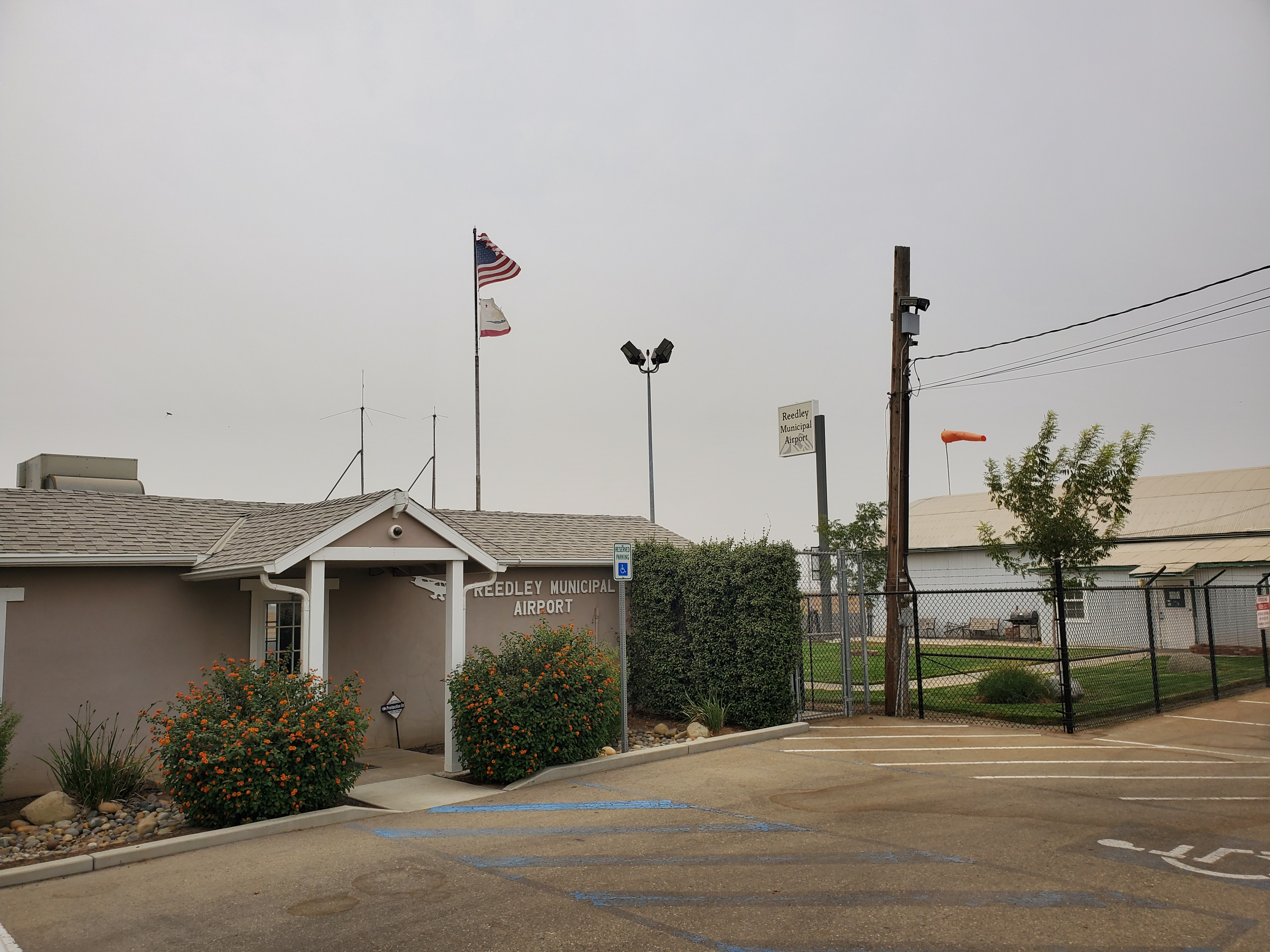
- IATA: none; ICAO: none; FAA LID: O32

Summary
- Airport type: Public
- Owner: City of Reedley
- Location: Reedley, California
- Elevation AMSL: 383 ft / 116.7 m
- Coordinates: 36°39′59″N 119°26′59″W
- Interactive map of Reedley Municipal Airport

Runways
Direction	Length		Surface
Direction	ft	m	Surface
15/33	3,300	1,006	Asphalt

Statistics (2020)
- Aircraft operations: 33,000
- Based aircraft: 21
- Source: Federal Aviation Administration

Reedley Municipal Airport (FAA LID: O32), sometimes referred to in shorthand but not officially as RMA, is a public airport located four miles (6.4 km) north of Reedley, serving southeast Fresno County and northeast Tulare County, California, USA.

== History of Operations ==
=== Great Western Airport ===
In 1946, the Reedley Flight Club created the Great Western Airport north of Reedley and southwest of Mount Campbell, as a private recreational facility. Since the early 1950's the Great Western Airport had been leased out for crop dusting operations under the name Great Western Aeronautics.

Great Western Elementary School, named after the airport, was built south of the facility, it is now a part of Kings Canyon Unified School District.

=== Reedley Municipal Airport ===
In April 1975, the City of Reedley proposed the establishment of Reedley Municipal Airport on the site of what had previously been the Great Western Airport. In their proposal, they noted that Great Western Airport was substandard for significant aviation use, and so after the City's acquisition of the landing strip, significant renovation would be needed. At the time, the area was unincorporated, and within the proposal, the City requested to incorporate the land the airport sits on into the city itself, creating a legal exclave north of the City.

In 2018, the Sustainable Aviation Project delivered four electric propulsion aircraft to Reedley Municipal Airport. Reedley City Manager Nicole Zieba gave a presentation to the Economic Development Corporation, proposing Reedley as an ideal place to expand sustainable aviation technology and careers, to take advantage of Reedley's location near Fresno, and to combat Reedley's growing 33% unemployment rate.

On August 7, 2020, Reedley Municipal Airport was the base of operations for the Giumarra Companies' test flight shipment of peaches to supply Gelson's Markets, a Southern California-based grocery retailer. The Cessna aircraft used for the test flew one hour from RMA to Whiteman Airport in Los Angeles. This delivery method was the first of its kind for Gelson's and the Giumarra Companies, when the peaches were sold at the retailer, they marketed them with information regarding the shipment, and the resulting freshness of the fruit. The test flight was considered a success, with Rob McDougall, CEO of Gelson's referring to it as "cutting edge."

== Facilities and aircraft ==
Reedley Municipal Airport covers an area of 138 acres (56 ha) which contains one asphalt paved runway (15/33) measuring 3,300 x 60 ft (1,006 x 18 m).

There are 21 single-engine aircraft based at Reedley Municipal Airport, and during the 12-month period ending on 30 January 2020, the airport logged 33,000 operations.
