= Sustainable Aviation Project =

- Available in: English
- Headquarters: Fresno, California, {{{location_country}}}
- Website: www.sustainableaviationproject.com
- Commercial: Yes

The Sustainable Aviation Project is a public-private collaboration to reduce the cost of flight training through the use of all-electric general aviation airplanes.

== History ==
The Sustainable Aviation Project was conceived by Joseph Oldham, Director of the San Joaquin Valley Clean Transportation Center, and developed with Richard Duncan, manager of Fresno Chandler Executive Airport. A private pilot for over forty years, Mr Oldham's professional work developing clean transportation collaborations between businesses and government combined with the introduction of the Alpha Electro all-electric airplane by Pipistrel lead to the realization that a similar collaboration could be used to reduce the relatively high cost of flight training and bring new opportunities to youth in the San Joaquin Valley. A grant through the Fresno Council of Governments New Technology Reserve Fund Grant program was won to fund the effort. The organizations involved with executing the Sustainable Aviation Project include the City of Reedley, City of Mendota, Reedley College, Mazzei Flying Service, the Fresno Business Council, and the CALSTART San Joaquin Valley Clean Transportation Center. Mr Oldham presented an update regarding the project to the Reedley Airport Commission on January 19, 2017 where the project was warmly received.

The four initial airport locations are:
Reedley Municipal Airport (O32)
William Robert Johnston Municipal Airport in Mendota (M90)
Fresno Chandler Executive Airport (KFCH)
Fresno Yosemite International Airport (KFAT)
