= Squaw Valley-Miramonte AVA =

Appellation that designates wine in Fresno County, California

Coordinates: 36.69277°N 119.103027°W

Squaw Valley-Miramonte
- Wine region
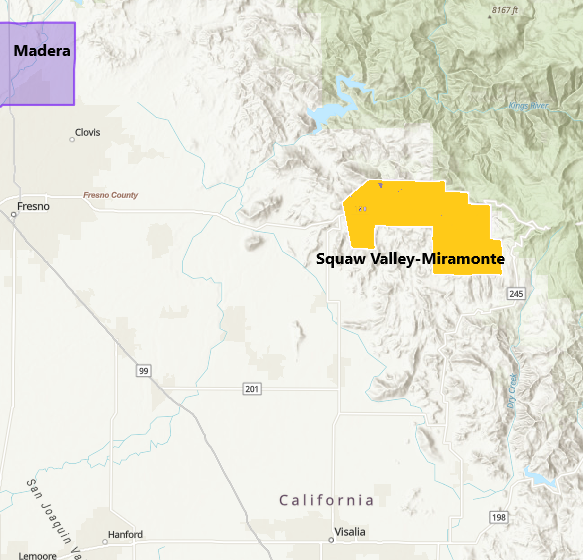
- Type: American Viticultural Area
- Year established: 2015
- Years of wine industry: 22
- Country: United States
- Part of: California, Fresno County
- Other regions in California, Fresno County: Madera AVA, Sierra Foothills AVA
- Climate region: Region IV-V
- Precipitation (annual average): 14 to 32 in (356–813 mm)
- Soil conditions: Vista, Sierra, and Auberry soil series
- Total area: 44,690 acres (70 sq mi)
- Size of planted vineyards: 7.5 acres (3.0 ha)
- No. of vineyards: 5
- Varietals produced: Aglianico, Barbera, Cabernet Franc, Cabernet Sauvignon, Carmenere, Mourvèdre, Petite Sirah, Sauvignon Blanc
- No. of wineries: 3

Squaw Valley-Miramonte is an American Viticultural Area (AVA) and a unique grape-growing region in Fresno County, California surrounding the towns of Yokuts Valley and Miramonte approximately 40 miles (64 km) east of the city of Fresno. It was established as the nation's 230^{th}, the state's 145^{th} and the county's second appellation on August 7, 2015 by the Alcohol and Tobacco Tax and Trade Bureau (TTB), Treasury after reviewing the petition submitted by Christine Flannigan, owner of the Sierra Peaks Winery and Purgatory Vineyards, on behalf of the Squaw Valley Grape Growers Group, proposing the viticulural area named "Squaw Valley-Miramonte."

It is largely a rural region located entirely within the foothills of the Sierra Nevada mountains and does not overlap any established AVAs. To the northwest, west, and south is the San Joaquin Valley while the Sequoia National Forest is adjacent to its northern and eastern boundaries. The scenic highway U.S. 180 bisects the region eastward from the Valley to the Big Trees in Kings Canyon and Sequoia National Parks. The AVA stretches over 44,690 acres (70 sq mi) with five commercially-producing vineyards cultivating about 7.5 acres (3.04 ha) and three bonded wineries.

== Terroir ==
=== Topography ===
The distinguishing features of Squaw Valley-Miramonte are its climate, topography, and soils. The topography consists of steep and rugged hillsides covered with boulders and oak woodlands. Elevations range from 1,600 to 3,500 feet (490–1,070 m), and slope angles in the vineyards range from 15 to 40 percent. As a result of the steep terrain, mechanized vineyard equipment is not practical, so almost all vineyard work is done manually. The vineyards are also much smaller than those in the neighboring San Joaquin Valley, where the terrain is lower and flatter.

=== Climate ===
Generally, the AVA's weather is above the fog and below the snow. With an average of 267 sunny days per year, Squaw Valley-Miramonte is part of the California interior chaparral and woodlands ecoregion, which exists on hills and mountains surrounding the San Joaquin Valley. Its winters are cool and wet while the summers are hot and dry. Daytime temperatures are cooler than in the neighboring Valley to the south, west, and northwest. However, nighttime temperatures are usually warmer because cool air drains off the slopes at night and settles in the Valley. The cool daytime temperatures and warm nighttime temperatures during the growing season produce higher levels of sugar and anthocyanins at harvest than occur in grapes grown in the warmer Valley.

Rainfall is 29–33 inches (737–838 mm) a year, typically more than that of the San Joaquin Valley and less than at elevations above 3,500 feet (1,067 m). The high rainfall amounts increase the risk of erosion, so vineyard owners plant ground cover between the vineyard rows to help hold the soil in place. Most of the precipitation in the AVA falls as rain; however, at higher elevations it sometimes falls in the form of some snow. Micro-climates, including cold air sinks and temperature inversions occur. The day/night temperature shift in Squaw Valley–Miramonte is less pronounced than in the valley, making the region's growing season from one to three weeks later. Vineyards are located on south and southwest-facing slopes, providing the heat, needed for vine growth. Winds flow downhill out of the mountains at night cooling the vines. The USDA plant hardiness zone range is 8b to 9b.

=== Soils ===
The majority of the soils within the AVA are derived from granitic material, mainly quartz diorite which differ from the Valley's predominately sandy loam soils. The three most common soil series are the Vista, Sierra, and Auberry series. All three soil series are described as having good drainage reducing the risk of root disease. The soils within the AVA are severely deficient in nitrogen, a nutrient necessary for vine growth, and therefore require supplementation. Additionally, soils in some of the vineyards have an excess of potassium, which interferes with the vines' ability to uptake magnesium. Much decomposing granite is just below the soil, making vines work hard to push down roots. As a result, magnesium must be added to the soil in these vineyards. To the north, the soils are primarily of the Coarsegold and Trabuco series, which are derived from weathered schist and igneous rock, respectively. The most common soil series east are the Holland series, derived from weathered granitic rock, and the Aiken series, derived from volcanic rocks. These soils are more acidic than the soils due to deep mats of decomposing needle litter from conifer trees. South and west, within the San Joaquin Valley, alluvial soils such as San Joaquin loam and San Joaquin sandy loam become common, as are soils of the Hanford and Greenfield series. These soils are all less acidic and have finer textures than the soils of Squaw Valley.

== Viticulture ==
The Viticulture and Enology Association of Squaw Valley-Miramonte (VEASVM) proposed the establishment of the Squaw Valley-Miramonte viticultural area in Fresno County, California. After achieving their initial goal, the VEASVM mission is to encourage and support grape growers and vintners within the AVA to grow high quality wine grapes and craft excellent wines. Sierra Peaks Winery and Vineyards, Delilah Ridge Winery, Riffelhoff Winery, Adrian Josephs' Vineyards, TRAhumada Vineyards, Inisfree Vineyards and Celestial Highlands are representatives of the local vintners.
