= Reedley, California =

City in California, United States

- City
- City of Reedley
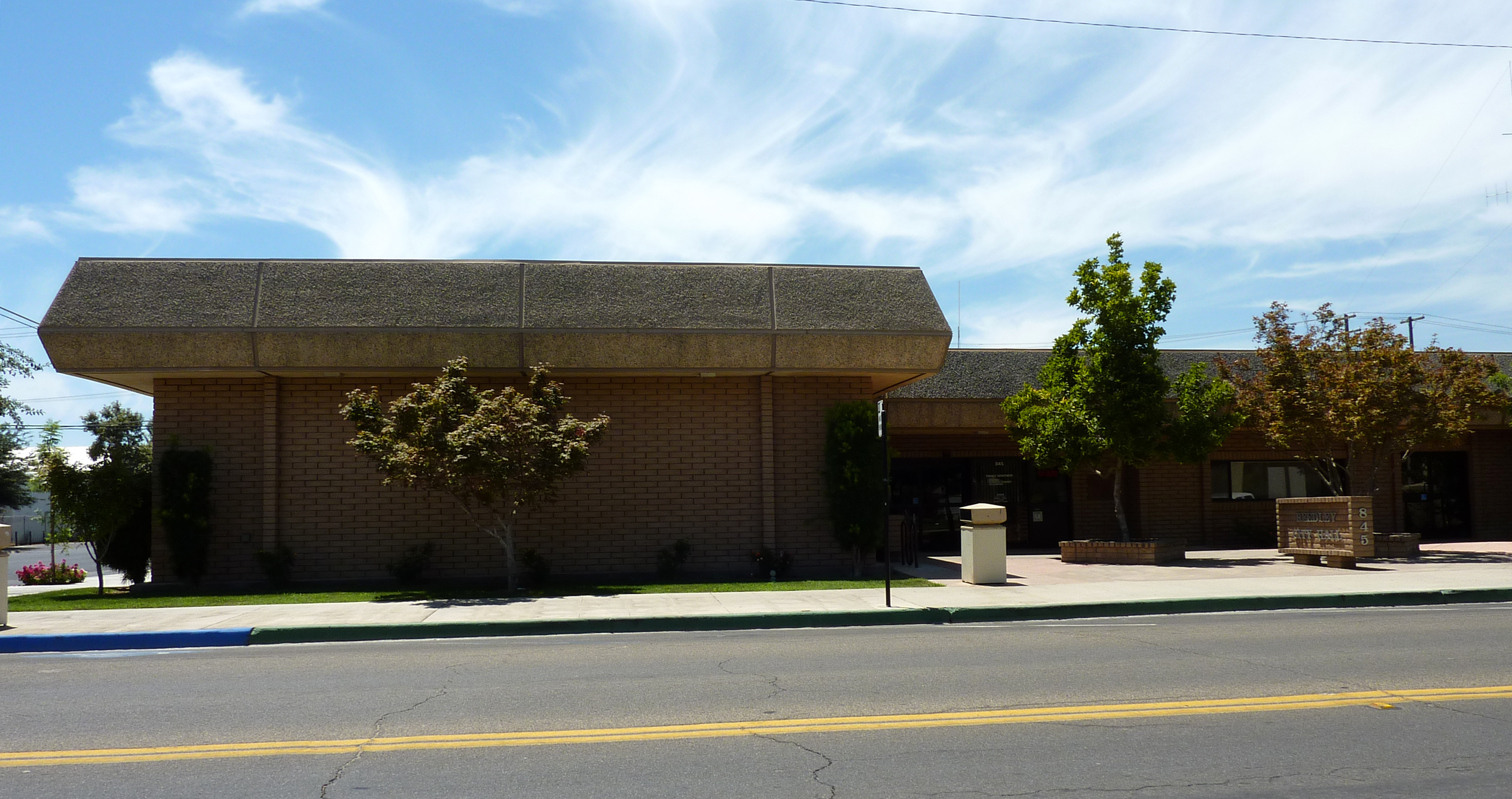
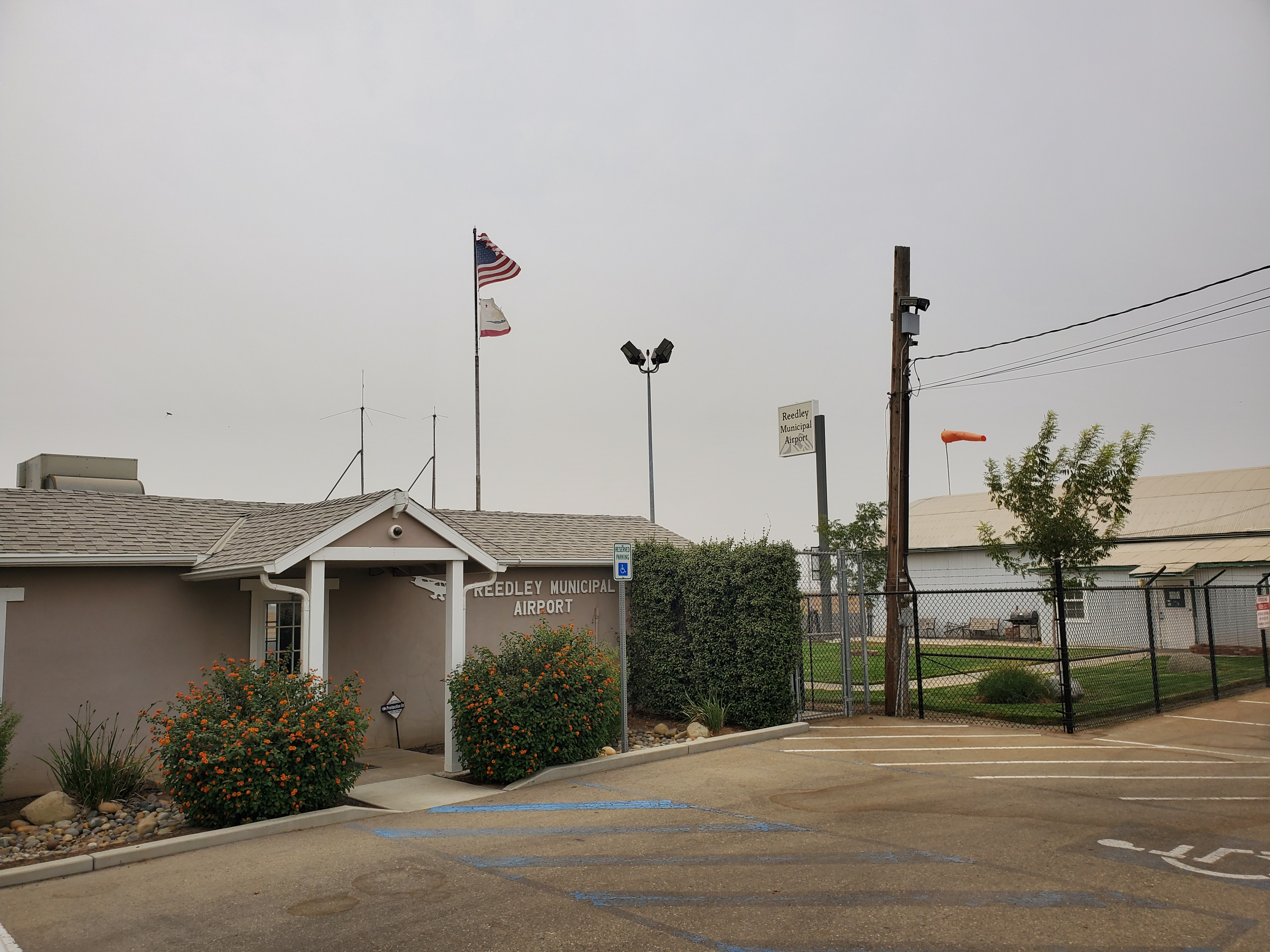
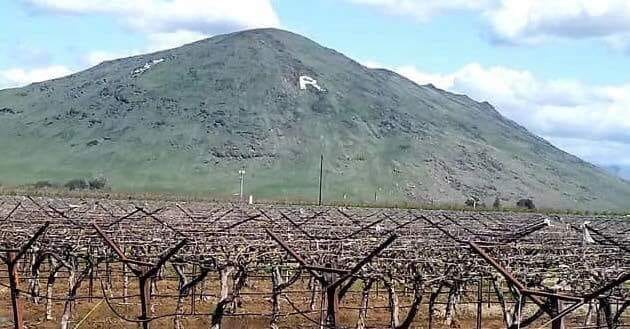
- Top: Reedley City Hall; Middle: Reedley Municipal Airport; Bottom: Campbell Mountain

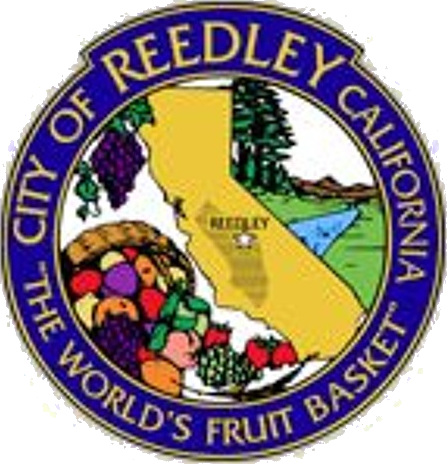
- Seal
- Nickname: "The World's Fruit Basket"
- Interactive map of Reedley, California
- Location within California Location within the United States
- Coordinates: 36°35′47″N 119°27′01″W
- Country: United States
- State: California
- County: Fresno
- Incorporated: February 18, 1913
- Named for: Thomas Law Reed

Government
  - Mayor: Matthew Tuttle
  - City Council: Christopher Arriaga; Michael Crutchfield; Mary Fast; Scott Friesen
  - State Senator: Anna Caballero (D)
  - State Assembly: Alexandra Macedo (R)
  - U. S. Congress: Jim Costa (D)

Area
  - Total: 5.58 sq mi (14.45 km^{2})
  - Land: 5.51 sq mi (14.27 km^{2})
  - Water: 0.073 sq mi (0.19 km^{2}) 1.29%
- Elevation: 348 ft (106 m)

Population (2020)
  - Total: 25,227
  - Density: 4,579/sq mi (1,768/km^{2})
- Demonym: Reedleyite
- Time zone: UTC-8 (PST)
  - Summer (DST): UTC-7 (PDT)
- ZIP code: 93654
- Area code: 559
- FIPS code: 06-60242
- GNIS feature IDs: 1659495, 2410920
- Website: reedley.ca.gov

Reedley is a city in Fresno County, California, United States. It is located in the San Joaquin Valley, 22 miles (35 km) east-southeast of Fresno, at an elevation of 348 feet (106 m). The population at the 2020 census was 25,227. Its chief economic source is agriculture, particularly fruit and vegetable cultivation and has thus dubbed itself "The World's Fruit Basket". Reedley is situated along the Kings River, downstream from Centerville.

Reedley hosts several cultural festivals, including but not limited to the Reedley Fiesta, and the Electrical Farm Equipment Parade.

Reedley is named for Thomas Law Reed, a Civil War veteran who gave half of his holdings to the township in 1888.

== History ==
In the mid-1800s, American Civil War Union veteran Thomas Law Reed settled in Reedley to grow wheat for Gold Rush miners. His donation of land for a railroad station site established the town as the center of the San Joaquin Valley's booming wheat industry. Southern Pacific Railroad officials commemorated his donation by naming the depot in his honor, which the city itself then adopted.

When gold mining fever began to fade, wheat demand slackened. Water from the Kings River was diverted for crop irrigation, and the region's agriculture diversified to include fruits, including grapes, figs, and peaches.

With the establishment of water and railroad services, farming families of European immigrants were recruited, and the settlement was incorporated in 1913, with Ordinance No. 1 adopting and prescribing the style of a Common Seal on February 25, 1913. That same year, the city's first cement sidewalks, sewer system, and fire department, as well as the first of two steel water towers were constructed. Because of proximity, the Reedley post office provided rural mail delivery to the surrounding region, including Route 2 which covered a section of nearby Tulare County (about 5 miles west of Dinuba).

A colony of Plautdietsch-speaking Mennonites, who travelled to California to escape the ecological disaster of the Dust Bowl played an important role in the town's early history, settling in Township 8, an area now known as Navelencia. Reedley contains a community of 25 different Christian churches, including Anglican, Catholic, Armenian, Baptist, and Mennonite congregations. The town is also home to a Buddhist temple. The city's cultural influences include Filipino, Finnish, Lebanese, Korean and Japanese immigrants. Since the 1940s, Reedley has seen a large increase in its Hispanic and Latino immigrant population, who have come to represent the majority of Reedley's ethnic makeup.

In 1988, Reedley celebrated the first 100 years since the construction of its Southern Pacific depot, and the 75th anniversary of incorporation. In 2013, the city celebrated its centennial.

In December 2022, local officials discovered an illegal biology lab at 850 I Street in Reedley. It contained blood, tissues, a biological safety cabinet, a centrifuge, an ultra-low-temperature freezer, transgenic mice, and a large number of other unlabeled items. The lab had been owned by Jiabei "Jesse" Zhu, also known under the false identity David He, via two different companies: "Universal Medtech Incorporated" and "Prestige Biotech Incorporated". (Zhu is a Chinese citizen who had graduated from Peking Union Medical College in 1991.)

In 2024, inspired by the lab incident, the Fresno County Board of Supervisors passed an ordinance that would require private labs to be inspected annually. In 2026, after a different lab possibly tied to this one was found near Las Vegas, the FBI searched the Reedley lab site again, finding no new hazards.

== Geography ==
According to the United States Census Bureau, the city has a total area of 5.6 square miles (15 km^{2}), of which 5.5 square miles (14 km^{2}) is land and 0.07 square miles (0.18 km^{2}) (1.29%) is water.

== City Buildings and Services ==
=== Reedley National Bank ===
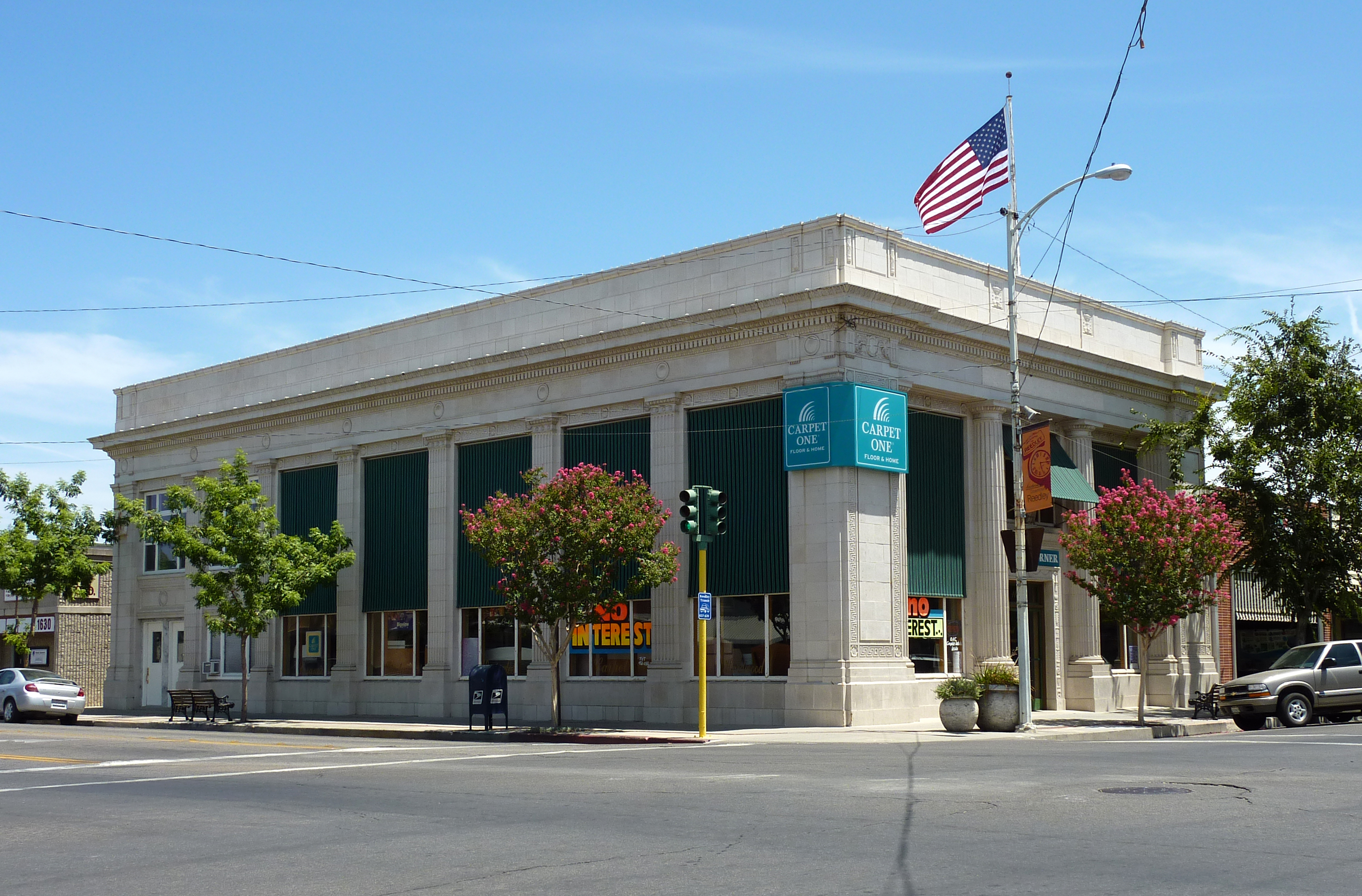
The Reedley National Bank building is listed on the National Register of Historic Places.

The Reedley National Bank building was built in 1907, when the city was first connected to electricity. The bank has since ceased operation. The building is situated on 1100 G Street.

=== Mid Valley Times ===
Reedley's downtown is the home of the local newspaper the Mid Valley Times, formerly known as the Reedley Exponent. The Exponent merged with the Sanger Herald and the Dinuba Sentinel in July 2019 in order to improve circulation.

=== Jansen Opera House ===
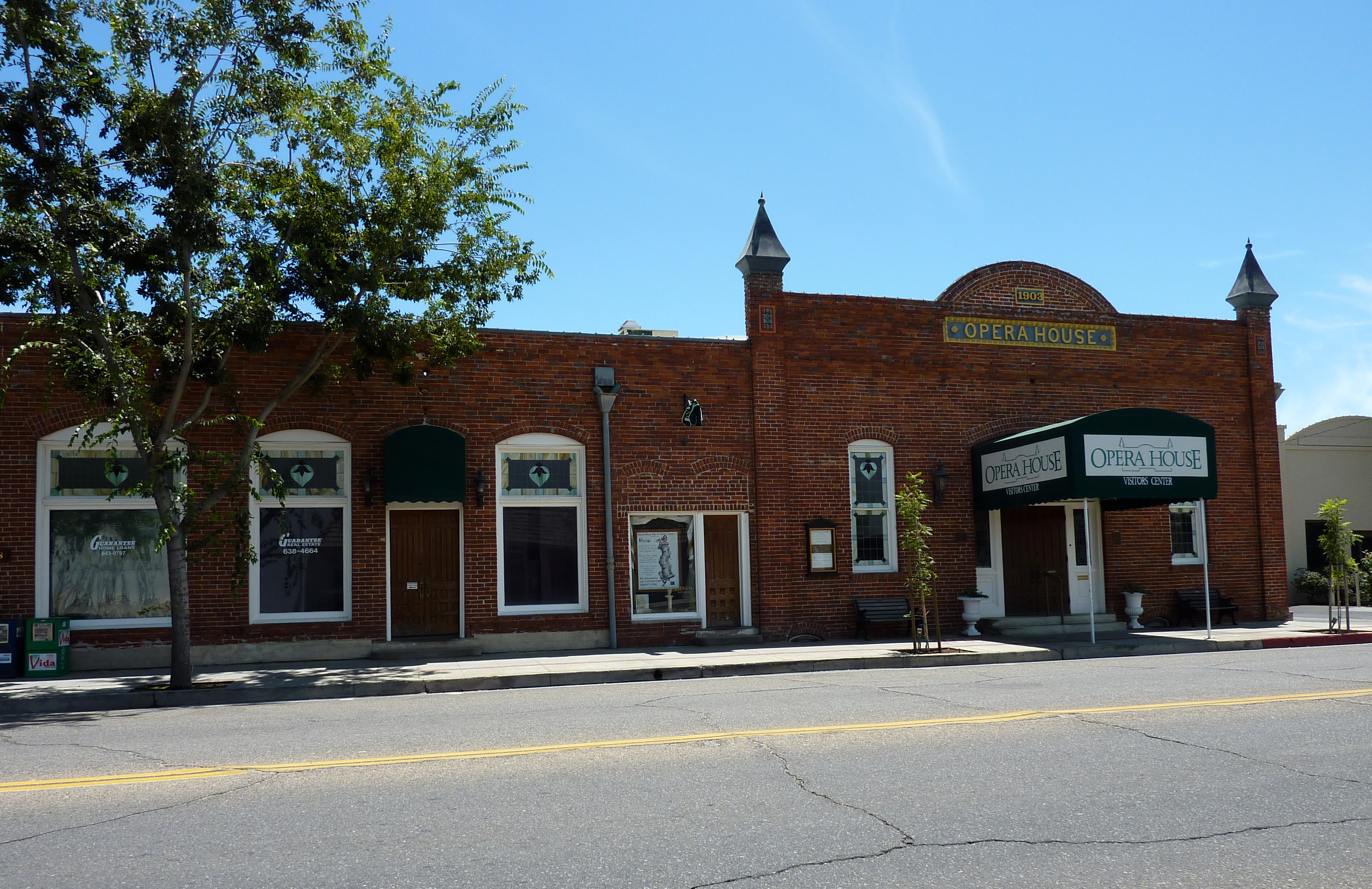
Reedley Opera House Complex, built by Jesse Jansen to serve as Reedley's cultural center.

The building that houses the Opera House was built in 1903, after a fire destroyed two blocks of downtown Reedley. Danish grain merchant, Jesse Jansen, rallied the downtown shopkeepers to rebuild Reedley's downtown out of brick. The Opera House itself was built at Jansen's personal expense to serve as a cultural and community center. In 1913, the population of Reedley met at the Opera House to vote for incorporation. After the early 1920s, movie houses replaced the popularity of theatre, and the building went into disuse until restoration in 1986. The City of Reedley acquired the building in 2002 by donation.

In 2003, the River City Theatre Company was founded by Mark Norwood, who served as artistic director until his retirement in 2016. The River City Theatre Company currently leases the Opera House and produces musicals and stage plays.

=== Reedley Municipal Airport ===
North of the city and southwest of Mount Campbell, Reedley Municipal Airport (FAA LID: O32) is a public airport, serving southeast Fresno County and northwest Tulare County. There are 21 single-engine aircraft based at Reedley Municipal Airport, and during the 12-month period ending on January 30, 2020, the airport logged 33,000 operations.

== City administration and policing ==
=== Government ===
Reedley has a Council-City Manager form of municipal government, located at 845 G Street.

=== Police ===
The Reedley Police Department is headquartered at 843 G Street, sharing a building with the city government.

The small communities and area surrounding Reedley are served by the Fresno County Sheriff's Office.

== Education ==
Kings Canyon Unified School District, which covers all of the city, is a public school system headquartered in Reedley, but also has schools located in the nearby city of Orange Cove, the towns of Dunlap, Miramonte, and the mountain communities. Reedley also offers private educational institutions such as St. La Salle School (Roman Catholic Private K-8) and Immanuel Schools (Mennonite Private K-12). The local community college, Reedley College, offers undergraduate higher education up to an associate degree as well as various certification courses.

Educational institutions in Reedley:

Elementary

- Alta Elementary School
- Jefferson Elementary School
- Great Western Elementary School
- Washington Elementary School
- Lincoln Elementary School
- Immanuel Elementary School

K-8 schools

- Thomas Law Reed K-8 School
- Riverview K-8 School
- Silas Bartsch K-8 School
- St. La Salle Catholic School

Middle schools

- General Grant Middle School
- Navelencia Middle School
- Immanuel Junior High School

High schools

- Reedley High School
- Immanuel High School
- Reedley Middle College High School

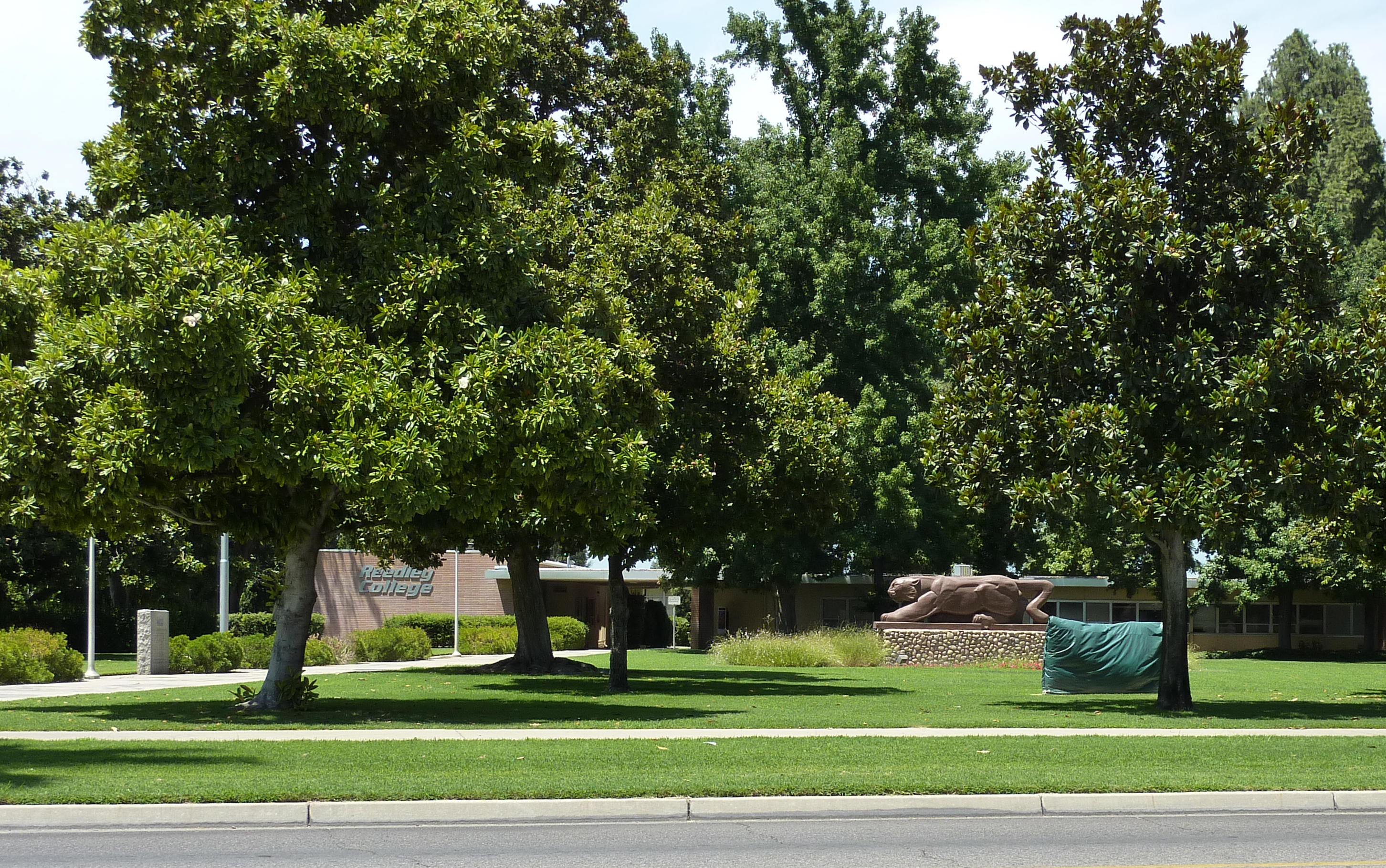
Reedley College in 2009

Alternative education

- Kings Canyon High School
- Mountain View Independent School

Community college

- Reedley College

== Demographics ==
Historical population
Census	Pop.	Note	%±
1920	2,447		—
1930	2,589		5.8%
1940	3,170		22.4%
1950	4,135		30.4%
1960	5,850		41.5%
1970	8,131		39.0%
1980	11,071		36.2%
1990	15,791		42.6%
2000	20,756		31.4%
2010	24,194		16.6%
2020	25,227		4.3%
2024 (est.)	26,138	▲	3.6%
U.S. Decennial Census

=== 2020 census ===
As of the 2020 census, Reedley had a population of 25,227 and a population density of 4,579.2 inhabitants per square mile (1,768.0/km^{2}). The median age was 32.4 years. 29.2% of residents were under the age of 18, 11.0% were aged 18 to 24, 25.2% were aged 25 to 44, 21.3% were aged 45 to 64, and 13.3% were 65 years of age or older. For every 100 females there were 97.1 males, and for every 100 females age 18 and over there were 95.1 males age 18 and over.

The census reported that 97.8% of the population lived in households, 1.4% lived in non-institutionalized group quarters, and 0.8% were institutionalized. There were 7,012 households, and the average household size was 3.52. Of all households, 50.2% had children under the age of 18 living in them, 54.6% were married-couple households, 6.6% were cohabiting-couple households, 14.0% were households with a male householder and no spouse or partner present, and 24.7% were households with a female householder and no spouse or partner present. About 14.6% of all households were made up of individuals and 8.1% had someone living alone who was 65 years of age or older. There were 5,714 families (81.5% of all households).

There were 7,247 housing units, of which 7,012 (96.8%) were occupied. Of occupied units, 57.0% were owner-occupied and 43.0% were renter-occupied. The homeowner vacancy rate was 0.7%, and the rental vacancy rate was 2.8%.

99.9% of residents lived in urban areas, while 0.1% lived in rural areas.

Racial composition as of the 2020 census
Race	Number	Percent
White	7,422	29.4%
Black or African American	121	0.5%
American Indian and Alaska Native	400	1.6%
Asian	747	3.0%
Native Hawaiian and Other Pacific Islander	6	0.0%
Some other race	11,015	43.7%
Two or more races	5,516	21.9%
Hispanic or Latino (of any race)	19,966	79.1%

=== 2023 American Community Survey ===
In 2023, the US Census Bureau estimated that 29.0% of the population were foreign-born. Of all people aged 5 or older, 39.7% spoke only English at home, 59.2% spoke Spanish, 0.6% spoke other Indo-European languages, 0.4% spoke Asian or Pacific Islander languages, and 0.1% spoke other languages. Of those aged 25 or older, 67.1% were high school graduates and 16.0% had a bachelor's degree.

The median household income in 2023 was $62,923, and the per capita income was $24,752. About 16.2% of families and 19.7% of the population were below the poverty line.

=== 2010 census ===
At the 2010 census Reedley had a population of 24,194. The population density was 4,693.2 people per square mile (1,800/km^{2}). The racial makeup of Reedley was 14,105 (58.3%) White, 169 (0.7%) African American, 267 (1.1%) Native American, 797 (3.3%) Asian, 8 (0.03%) Pacific Islander, 7,850 (32.4%) from other races, and 998 (4.1%) from two or more races. Hispanic or Latino of any race were 18,455 persons (76.3%).

The census reported that 23,945 people (99% of the population) lived in households, 119 (0.5%) lived in non-institutionalized group quarters, and 130 (0.5%) were institutionalized.

There were 6,569 households, out of which 3,544 (54%) had children under the age of 18 living in them, 3,988 (60.7%) were opposite-sex married couples living together, 946 (14.4%) had a female householder with no husband present, 521 (7.9%) had a male householder with no wife present. There were 440 (6.7%) unmarried opposite-sex partnerships, and 39 (0.6%) same-sex married couples or partnerships. 886 households (13.5%) were one person and 471 (7.2%) had someone living alone who was 65 or older. The average household size was 3.65. There were 5,455 families (83% of all households); the average family size was 3.94.

The age distribution was 7,869 people (32.5%) under the age of 18, 2,797 people (11.6%) aged 18 to 24, 6,594 people (27.3%) aged 25 to 44, 4,627 people (19.1%) aged 45 to 64, and 2,307 people (9.5%) who were 65 or older. The median age was 29.1 years. For every 100 females, there were 104.0 males. For every 100 females age 18 and over, there were 102.7 males.

There were 6,867 housing units at an average density of 1,332.1 per square mile (510/km^{2}), of which 6,569 were occupied, of which 3,881 (59.1%) were owner-occupied, and 2,688 (40.9%) were occupied by renters. The homeowner vacancy rate was 1.8%; the rental vacancy rate was 3.7%. 13,704 people (56.6% of the population) lived in owner-occupied housing units and 10,241 people (42.3%) lived in rental housing units.

== Notable people ==
- Charles B. Garrigus, Poet Laureate and state legislator; former professor at Reedley College and Reedley resident
- Kris Holmes, type designer and president of Bigelow & Holmes Inc.
- Lacy Barnes-Mileham, Atlanta 1996 Olympics athlete in discus; psychology professor at Reedley College
- Ed Kezirian, UCLA football coach, attended and coached at Reedley College
- Ernestine Gilbreth Carey, author of Cheaper By the Dozen, lived in Reedley
- Paul Hurst, actor, appeared in Gone With the Wind
- Vic Lombardi, Major League Baseball player who pitched for the Pirates and Dodgers; born in Reedley
- Rick Besoyan, singer, actor, playwright, composer, and director of musicals such as Little Mary Sunshine
- Silas Bartsch, former administrator and interim president of Fresno Pacific University; a K-8 public school in southeast Reedley is named in his honor.
- Katherine Esau, botanist
- Hideo Sasaki, landscape architect, born in Reedley
