= Silas Bartsch =

- Born: May 13, 1926; Mountain Lake, Minnesota, U.S.
- Died: October 18, 2001 (aged 75); Reedley, California, U.S.
- Occupation: professor
- Known for: Set up a distance education program that allowed his University to expand

Silas Bartsch (May 13, 1926 – October 18, 2001) was an American school administrator who acted as a superintendent in Reedley, California. He was first superintendent of the Kings Canyon Unified School District. Bartsch was superintendent for five years, then left to begin a career at then Fresno Pacific University.

== Early life ==
Bartsch was born on May 13, 1926, in Mountain Lake, Minnesota. When he was 14, his family moved to Reedley. He graduated from Reedley High School and enlisted in United States Army. Upon discharge, he returned to Reedley and graduated from Reedley College in 1949. He also graduated from Chapman College in Los Angeles, with a major in history and education. He completed a year of post graduate study at Berkeley Baptist Divinity School, as well.

== Career ==
In 1952, Bartsch began his teaching career as a fourth grade teacher at Washington School. Bartsch later taught at General Grant School before becoming principal in 1958. In 1961, he was appointed superintendent of Reedley Elementary School District, and in 1965, of the newly formed Kings Canyon Unified School District. Five years later, he began a new teaching career at Fresno Pacific College, but he remained active in his hometown until his death.

He was Professor of Education at Fresno Pacific. Fresno Pacific was initially a religious college, and the Education Department Bartsch lead brought in other students, and more funding.

Bartsch became the first Dean of the University's School of Professional Studies.

== Death and legacy ==
Bartsch died on October 18, 2001, in Reedley, California, at the age of 75.

In June 2008, a new K-8 school in Kings Canyon Unified School District was named Silas Bartsch School. The campus was opened on October 29, 2008. He and his wife, Nadine, also had the building that housed the Education Department at Fresno Pacific University campus named after them; Bartsch Hall.
