= O32 =

O32 may refer to:

- Douglas O-32, an observation aircraft of the United States Army Air Corps
- Otoyol 32, a motorway in Turkey
- Reedley Municipal Airport, in Tulare County, California, United States
- O32, a calling convention on MIPS architectures
