= Cessna 162 Skycatcher =

American side-by-side two-seat light sport airplane

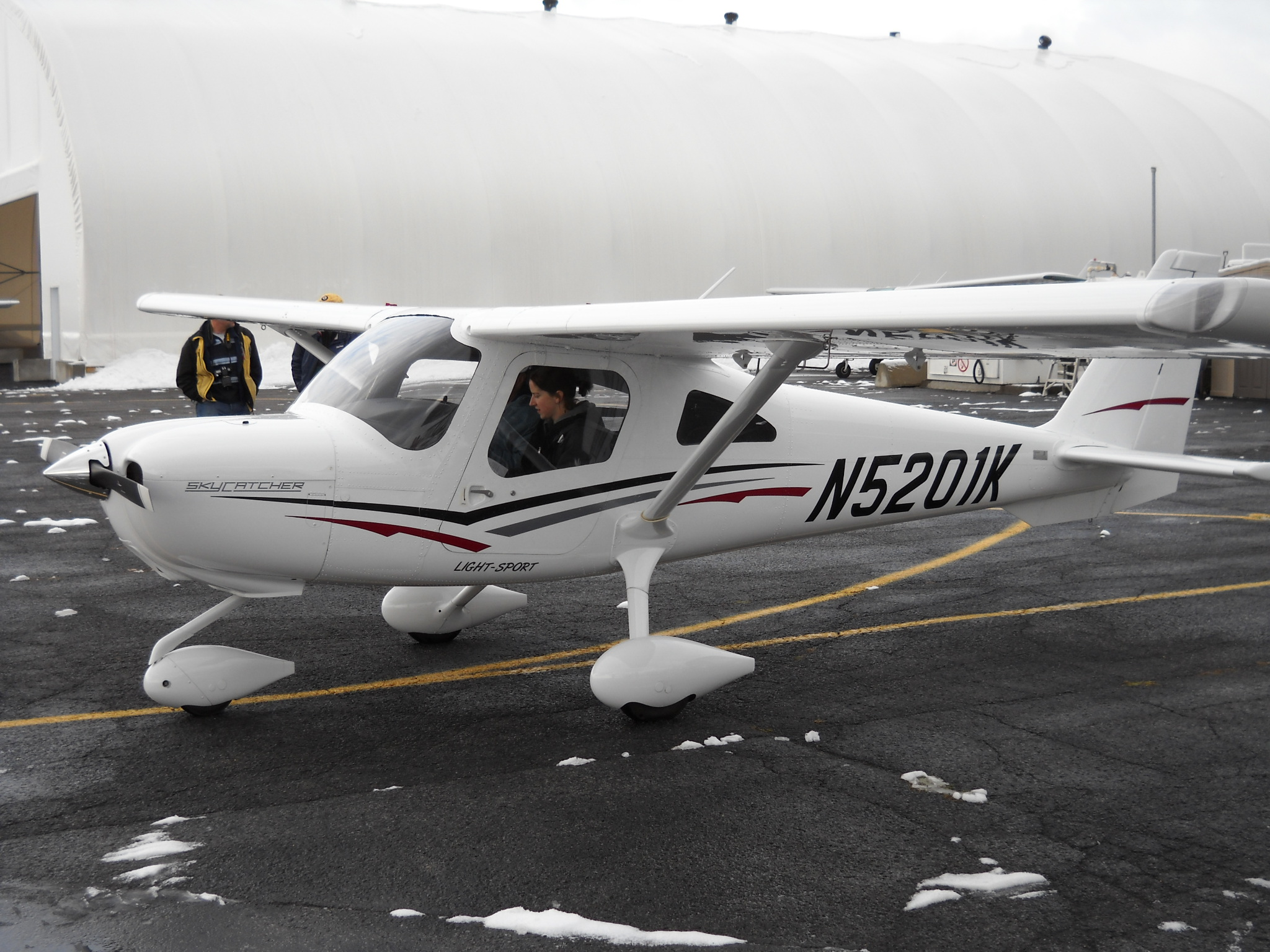
- Production Cessna 162

General information
- Type: Personal use and flight training aircraft
- Manufacturer: Cessna
- Status: Production completed (2013)
- Number built: 275+ (December 2013)

History
- Manufactured: December 2009 – December 2013
- First flight: October 13, 2006 (concept aircraft); March 8, 2008 (conforming prototype)

The Cessna 162 Skycatcher is an American side-by-side two-seat, high-wing, strut-braced, tricycle gear light-sport aircraft (LSA) that was designed and produced by Cessna between December 2009 and December 2013. Its intended market was flight training and personal use.

The Skycatcher received its ASTM LSA approval in July 2009.

At one time 1200 Skycatchers had been ordered, but the aircraft did not meet customer expectations and only 192 aircraft had been sold before production ended in 2013. The remaining 80 unsold aircraft were used for parts until December 2016 when the remaining aircraft were scrapped.

== Development ==
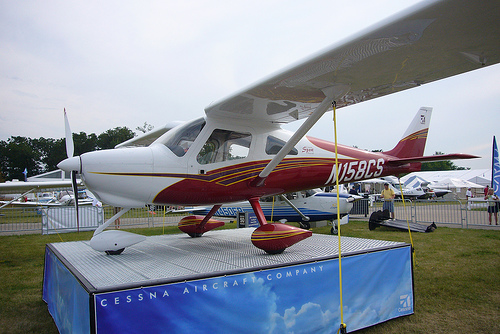
N158CS, the proof-of-concept, on display at the EAA AirVenture Oshkosh 2006

Cessna had announced its intentions to study the feasibility of developing and producing an LSA on 6 June 2006. The concept design was unveiled on 24 July 2006 at EAA AirVenture Oshkosh as the Cessna LSA (also referred to as the Cessna Sport), via a marketing study of the feasibility of producing an aircraft compliant with the U.S. Federal Aviation Administration's new Light-Sport Aircraft category.

On 13 October 2006, nine months after launching the program, the concept prototype aircraft, registered N158CS, first flew, departing McConnell Air Force Base for Wichita's Mid-Continent Airport and reaching a speed of 110 knots (200 km/h). Cessna formally launched the Skycatcher program 10 July 2007, following with a press event on 22 July 2007 at EAA AirVenture Oshkosh that unveiled a full-scale mockup and details about the planned production version. At that event, Cessna posted a price of $109,500, and reportedly secured 720 orders by the end of the event (claiming 1000 orders a year later).

The conforming prototype had its first flight on 8 March 2008, and the first initial production configuration aircraft flew on 5 May 2008.

Power was from the 100 hp Continental O-200D, a piston engine with a fixed-pitch propeller. The 162 was equipped and approved for day and night VFR. Avionics were the Garmin G300 suite.

The company carried out testing of the aircraft beyond the ASTM Light Sport Aircraft requirements, including ground vibration testing and a full airframe fatigue test program on a production aircraft. In July 2009, Cessna announced that the 162 had completed flight testing to ASTM standards. However, two prototypes were lost in unrecoverable spins during flight testing (pilots surviving).

On 9 August 2007, Cessna Aircraft announced that they had orders for 720 Skycatchers totaling US$75M. By 24 November 2007, Cessna had 850 firm orders and by the end of 2008 the company had confirmed over 1,000 orders. In July 2009, orders were still reported at "over 1,000." Cessna vice president of propeller aircraft sales John Doman said sales activity had been slow because customers did not want to wait approximately four years for a delivery slot. In December 2009, the company delivered the first production Skycatcher to its initial customer, Cessna CEO Jack Pelton's wife, Rose Pelton. The company intended that the 2010 production rate would be 300 to 400 a year, but only 30 aircraft were delivered in 2010. By late 2013 "droves" of position holders had canceled their orders due to price increases and failure of the design to meet expectations.

In October 2013, at the National Business Aviation Association convention, Cessna CEO Scott Ernest stated that the Cessna 162 had "no future". Cessna Vice President, Piston Aircraft, Jodi Noah, indicated that the aircraft had not met expectations.

In February 2014, sales were halted. In December 2016, the remaining 80 unsold 162s were scrapped. These had been used to provide parts to keep the flying fleet going.

In analyzing the imminent end of Skycatcher production, Paul Bertorelli of AVweb indicated that the reasons for ending production were high price, poor useful load and lackluster flight performance compared to its LSA market competitors.

In a February 2017 review of the aircraft's history, AVweb writer Geoff Rapoport blamed the aircraft's failure on an empty weight that was too high, fragile construction and lack of cockpit space for taller pilots. He stated, "the Skycatcher can’t keep up because it wasn’t really designed as an LSA. It’s a scaled-down Cessna 152, which is a scaled-down Cessna 172, which is a scaled-down 747. I hope I’m not bursting anyone’s bubble by pointing out that Cessna is not exactly a modern innovator in design of light aircraft." He concluded, "is this all the proof we need that LSAs make for bad airplanes? Well, maybe it’s just proof that the Skycatcher was a bad airplane."

=== Chinese production controversy ===
On 27 November 2007, Cessna announced that the Cessna 162 would be made in the People's Republic of China by Shenyang Aircraft Corporation, which is a subsidiary of Aviation Industry Corporation of China, a Chinese government-owned consortium of aircraft manufacturers. By manufacturing the aircraft in China, Cessna reported that it saved US$71,000 in production costs per aircraft produced. A second reason cited for moving production to Shenyang Aircraft Corporation was that Cessna at that time had no plant capacity available in the United States.

The decision to produce the aircraft in China was controversial, and Cessna received a high degree of negative feedback from Cessna 162 customers and potential customers.

The first production Cessna 162 had its initial flight at Shenyang Aircraft in China on 17 September 2009. Customer deliveries started in December 2009.

However, to ship the aircraft to Wichita from China, they had to be disassembled, then re-assembled in Wichita. Re-assembly was assigned to Yingling Aircraft, the leading Cessna FBO, which became the first FAA-certified repair station for the Skycatcher. The Skycatcher work was transferred to Cessna's Independence, Kansas factory in 2014.

=== Pricing ===
Cessna President and CEO Jack Pelton had originally indicated that Cessna was aiming for a price of under US$100,000 for the aircraft, which Pelton indicated would be a challenge to achieve. At that price point, Pelton predicted that Cessna would be able to sell 600 of the aircraft per year.

The 22 July 2007 announcement indicated that these price goals were not met. The first 1000 aircraft ordered were sold for US$109,500. The price was increased to US$111,500 in 2008 and US$112,250 in 2010.

In November 2011, the company indicated that the price was being increased to US$149,000. Part of the price increase was due to the incorporation of optional features as standard, including the multi-function display, intercom and sun visors. About US$20,000 of the increase was to improve company profits on the aircraft. Russ Niles writing for AVweb noted, "the new price puts the Skycatcher at the upper end of the market for LSAs". The 30% price increase attracted aviation media attention. Paul Bertorelli writing for AVweb concluded, "Only one thing mystifies me about this decision. Cessna is the only LSA manufacturer well established with manufacturing in China. If a company with Cessna's economy of scale and marketing acumen can't make an LSA more affordable by building it in China, the notion of low-cost aircraft may very well be the myth that many people think it is."

The price increase to US$149,000 left the design priced well above its competition and also contractually allowed buyers who had deposits on the Cessna 162 to cancel their orders and claim refunds, which, by the end of 2013, large numbers of position holders did.

=== European certification ===
In April 2012, the company was forced to refund deposits to a number of customers in Europe due to delays in gaining EASA certification. The 162 required both a type certificate and production certificate to be sold in Europe and at that point it had neither.

In July 2012, the company announced its solution, that the design would be removed from the US light-sport category and moved to the primary aircraft category. Primary category acceptance would have included type and production certificates and would have allowed the aircraft to be sold in Europe after the certification was validated. Primary Category certification was never completed.

== Design ==
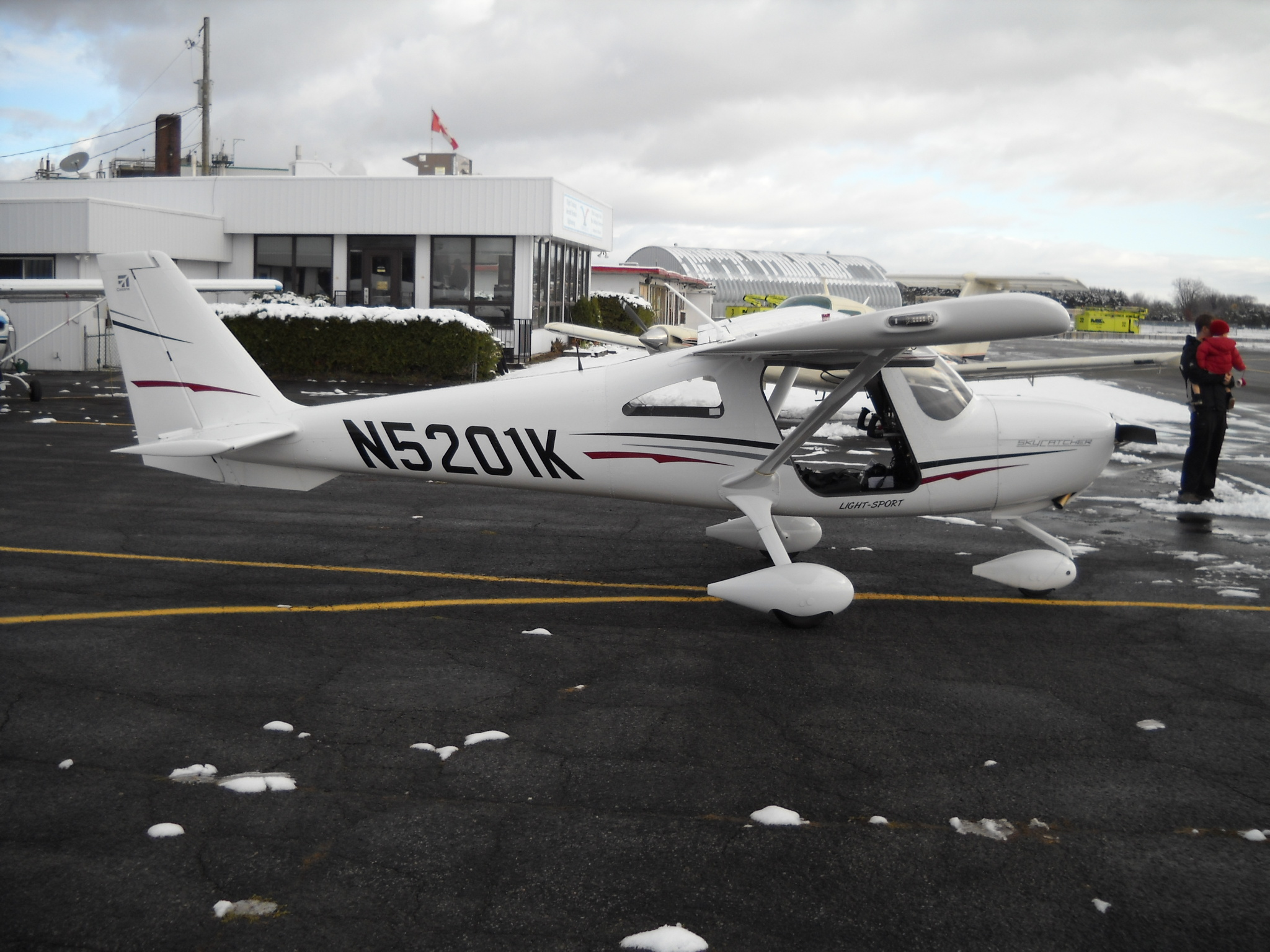
Production Skycatcher number ten, assembled for Cessna by Yingling Aviation from parts supplied by Shenyang Aircraft Corporation

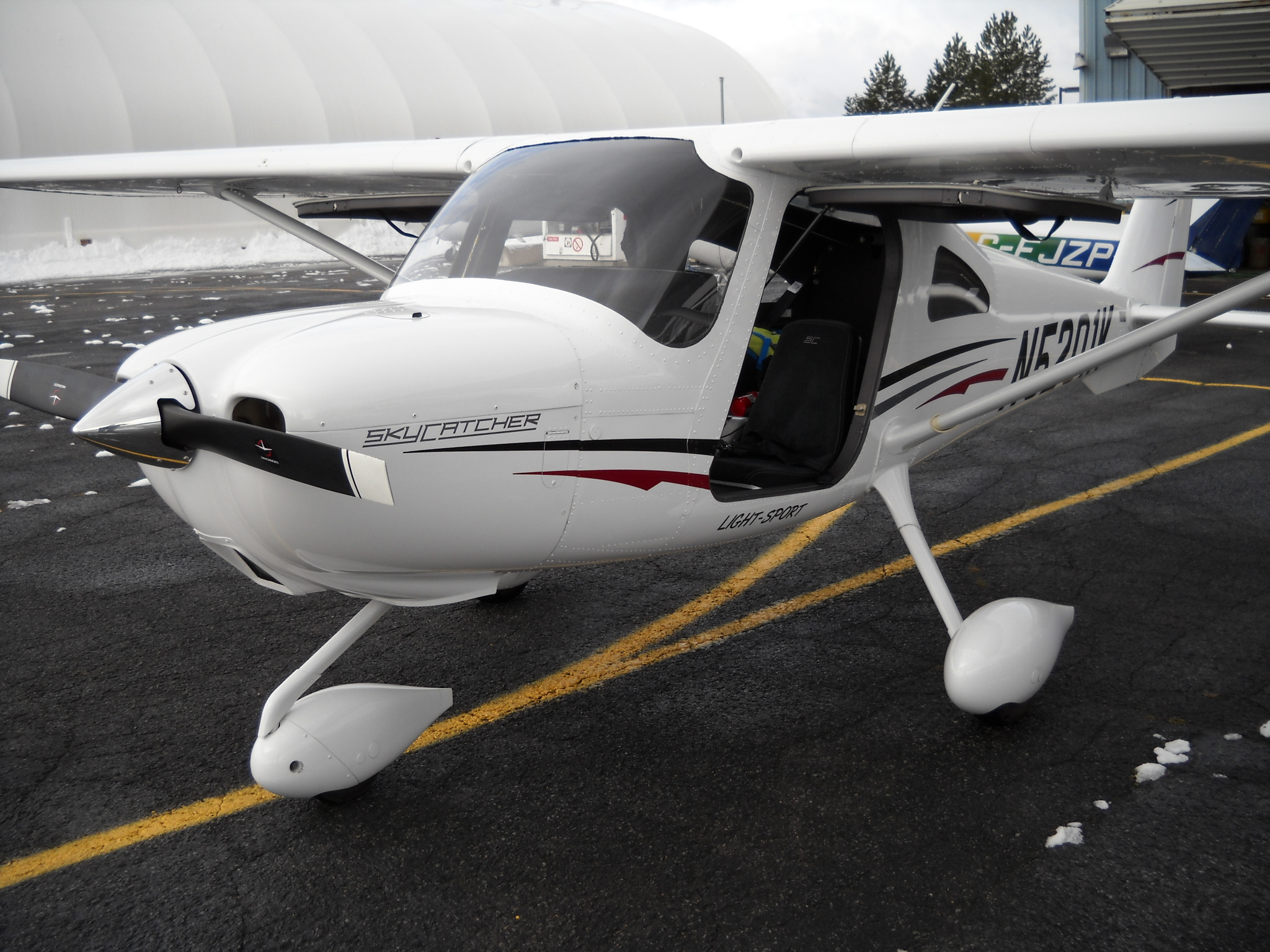
Cessna 162 Skycatcher number ten

The Cessna 162's design evolved considerably from the first prototype, including the wing position and tail configuration. The high-wing monoplane has fixed tricycle landing gear, with a castering nosewheel. The wingspan is 30 feet (9.14 m) and internal cabin width is 44 inches (1.12 m) at shoulder height. The doors are different from previous two-seat Cessna models in that they open by swinging upward. The controls are unusual for a Cessna in that they have single-hand panel-mounted yokes instead of the usual two-hand panel-mounted yokes.

The aircraft's structure is mostly aluminum with a fiberglass cowling. Cessna LSA Project head Neal Willford indicated in August 2006 that Cessna was investigating the use of "match hole drilling" to reduce costs and simplify construction of the design. This technique is widely used in the kit-plane industry and in construction of larger aircraft, but would be Cessna's first use in its single-engine line. On 9 October 2007 Cessna announced that a Ballistic Recovery Systems airframe ballistic parachute system would be a factory-installed option on the Cessna 162.

While the initial proof-of-concept aircraft flew with a 100 hp (75 kW) Rotax 912S engine, the production Cessna 162 is powered by a direct drive air-cooled, carbureted Continental O-200-D engine, producing 100 hp (75 kW) at 2,800 rpm and equipped with a two-blade, fixed pitch composite propeller. With the O-200D engine the Skycatcher is capable of cruise at speeds as high as 118 knots (136 mph; 219 km/h), with a maximum range of 470 nautical miles (870 km) at a gross weight of 1,320 pounds (600 kg).

The Cessna 162 is equipped for day and night VFR flying only. Production aircraft were delivered with a Garmin G300 EFIS installed, as well as a Garmin SL40 communications radio, a GTX327 transponder, and a 121.5 MHz ELT. Flight data is presented on the G300 in a single, split-screen combination primary flight display and multi-function display. Information can also be shown on two full-screen displays with installation of a second screen, which were purchase options. An autopilot and an audio panel were also available options.

The Cessna 162 has a maximum gross take-off weight of 1,320 lb (599 kg) and a standard empty weight of 834 lb (378 kg). With a full fuel load of 144 lb (65 kg) the payload remaining for crew and baggage is 342 lb (155 kg). The standard empty weight does not include the fire extinguisher, ELT, wheel pants, engine primer, unusable fuel and many other items normally included. One typical early production aircraft had an equipped weight of 865 lb (392 kg), giving a full fuel payload of 311 lb (141 kg).

=== Test flying crashes and redesigns ===
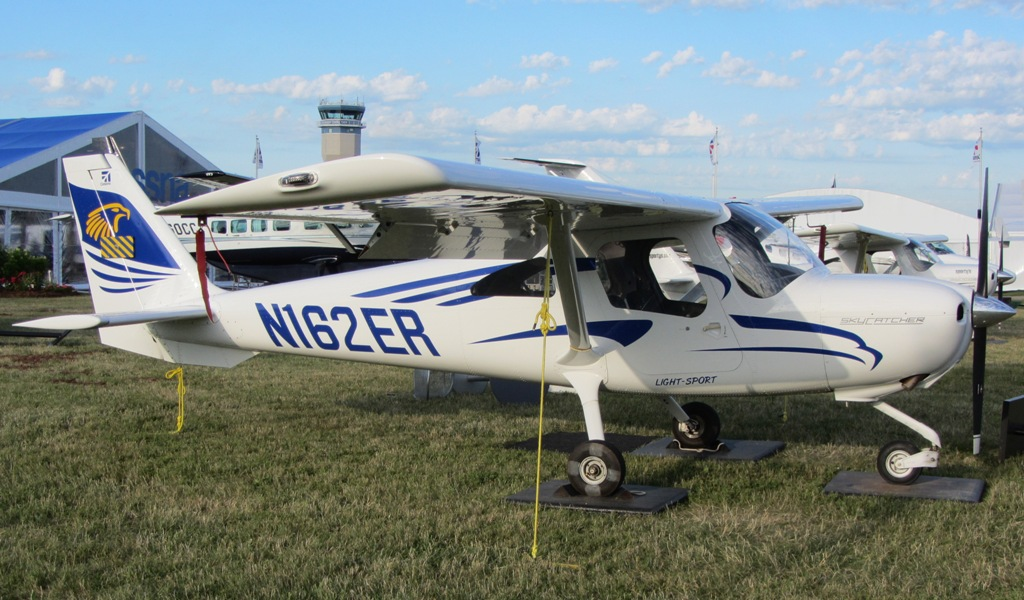
Cessna 162 in Embry Riddle Aeronautical University service

==== First prototype crash ====
A non-conforming prototype Cessna 162, registered N162XP, crashed on 18 September 2008, in a treeline near Douglass, Kansas, approximately 20 miles (32 km) southeast of Wichita, Kansas. The test pilot parachuted to safety and suffered only minor injuries. The prototype had flown about 150 hours prior to the accident.

The National Transportation Safety Board stated on 18 September 2008 that the Cessna 162 was registered in the experimental category and was conducting a test flight when the accident occurred. The test sequence involved a series of stalls starting at 10,000 feet (3,000 m). The aircraft entered an unintentional flat spin and was not under control at 5,000 feet (1,500 m), at which point the test pilot bailed out of the aircraft. Cessna confirmed that the 162 entered a spin from a cross-controlled, power-on stall, that the spin became flat and recovery was not possible. The company indicated that the testing was outside that required for LSA certification and that the accident will result in only small design changes. The aircraft was equipped with a Ballistic Recovery Systems parachute, but it failed to deploy when activated.

==== 2008 redesign ====
Despite earlier claims that the design would undergo only small changes as a result of the crash of the prototype, in late 2008 the 162 received a redesigned vertical stabilizer. The new fin is of greater area and less sweep than the original. Cessna stated wind-tunnel testing of the new configuration showed that it now had no unrecoverable spin characteristics. The redesigned tail was first flown on N162CE, the first production-conforming aircraft, on 15 December 2008.

Another focus of the design changes was weight savings, as a result the 162's seats were redesigned and the seat structure changed from composite to aluminum. With the new larger fin the dorsal fin was unneeded and was deleted from the design to save weight.

==== Second prototype crash ====
N162CE was involved in an accident during a test flight on 19 March 2009 near Wichita, Kansas. During aggressive spin testing, with power on and in a cross-controlled condition, the aircraft entered a "rapid and disorienting spin" and the test pilot was unable to recover control of the aircraft. The test pilot successfully deployed the aircraft's ballistic recovery parachute, which stopped the spin, but, despite being designed to be jettisonable, could not be released from the aircraft. Since the aircraft was too low for a bail-out, the pilot remained with the aircraft, which crash-landed, sustaining damage to the landing gear, but left the pilot uninjured. The pilot exited the aircraft and attempted to remove the parachute, which remained attached to the aircraft. Wind then dragged the aircraft 0.6 mi (1.0 km) into a fence, leaving it inverted and heavily damaged. The accident left Cessna with no flying Skycatcher aircraft in the testing program.

Following the crash of the second prototype, a company spokesman stated that all the details about the program's future were under review by the company. On 25 March 2009, Cessna CEO Jack Pelton confirmed that the 162 program would continue, saying: "The need for a modern, cost-effective two-seat trainer aircraft has never been greater, and we believe we are well positioned to meet that need. The Skycatcher program is an important part of our strategy."

The final production 162 incorporated a thicker wing and further changes to the tail, including a ventral fin, to make the aircraft more resistant to spins.

=== Production ===
In January 2010, the company announced that customer deliveries of production 162s would be delayed by six to ten months. The company indicated that most of the delay was due to modifications required to aircraft produced by Shenyang Aircraft as a result of further spin testing and the earlier crashes of the prototypes. The first production aircraft were delivered from China, assembled by Cessna contractor Yingling Aviation and then modified by adding the ventral fin and decreasing the elevator and aileron travel. In February 2012, the assembly of the plane was moved to Cessna's Independence, Kansas, factory, ending Yingling's participation. Cessna had planned to incorporate the airframe changes into the Chinese production line. Production had ceased by February 2014.

=== Wing modifications of aircraft in service ===
In November 2012, Cessna issued a Mandatory Service Bulletin (MSB) as a result of cracks found on its cyclic test aircraft. The MSB requires addition of new wing ribs and modifications to the wing attachment structure for the first 228 Cessna 162s built. The modification was extensive, required 32 man-hours to complete and was required to be done within the next 100 flight hours or at the next annual inspection, whichever came first. Cessna paid to modify all aircraft involved.

== Operational history ==
As of August 2022, there were 175 Skycatchers remaining on the US Federal Aviation Administration registry. As of October 2024, the largest operator of the Cessna 162 is Rainier Flight Service in Renton, Washington, operating 22 Skycatchers.

== Specifications ==
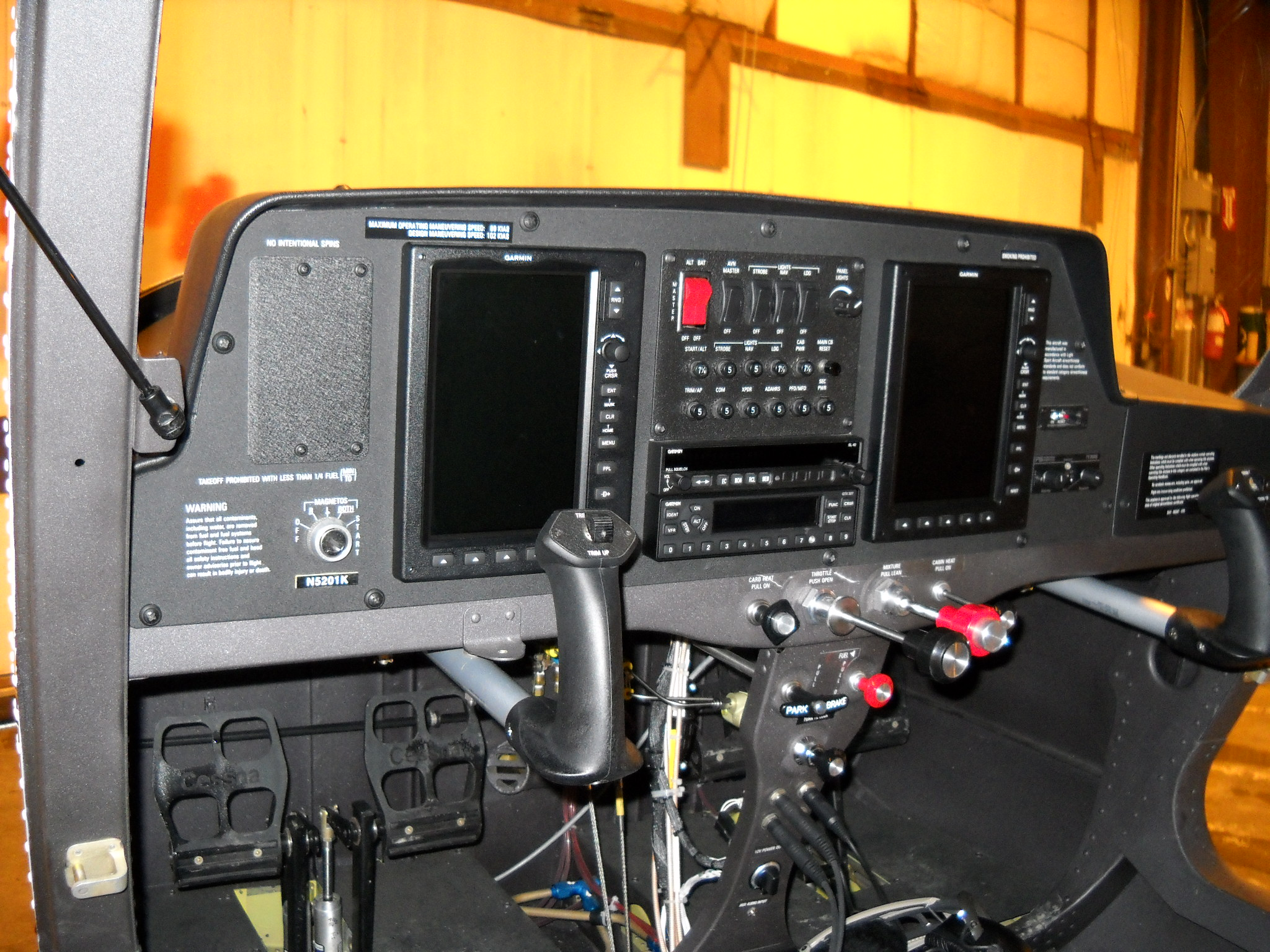
Cessna 162 Skycatcher instrument panel. This aircraft is a factory demonstrator and has the second optional EFIS display installed.

Data from Flying and Cessna.com

General characteristics

- Crew: one
- Capacity: one passenger
- Length: 22.8 ft (6.9 m)
- Wingspan: 30.0 ft (9.1 m)
- Height: 8.53 ft (2.60 m)
- Wing area: 120 sq ft (11 m^{2})
- Empty weight: 830 lb (376 kg)
- Gross weight: 1,320 lb (599 kg)
- Powerplant: 1 × Continental O-200D air-cooled flat-four, 100 hp (75 kW)

Performance

- Maximum speed: 118 kn (136 mph, 219 km/h)
- Cruise speed: 112 kn (129 mph, 207 km/h)
- Range: 470 nmi (540 mi, 870 km)
- Service ceiling: 15,500 ft (4,700 m)
- Rate of climb: 890 ft/min (4.5 m/s)

== See also ==
Related development

- Cessna NGP

Aircraft of comparable role, configuration, and era

- Arion Lightning
- Blackshape Prime
- 3Xtrim 3X55 Trener
- Fantasy Air Allegro
- Flight Design CT
- Pipistrel Alpha Trainer
- Rans S-7 Courier
- Remos GX
- Tecnam P92
- Van's Aircraft RV-12
