= Pipistrel Alpha Trainer =

Slovenian light-sport aircraft

Alpha Trainer
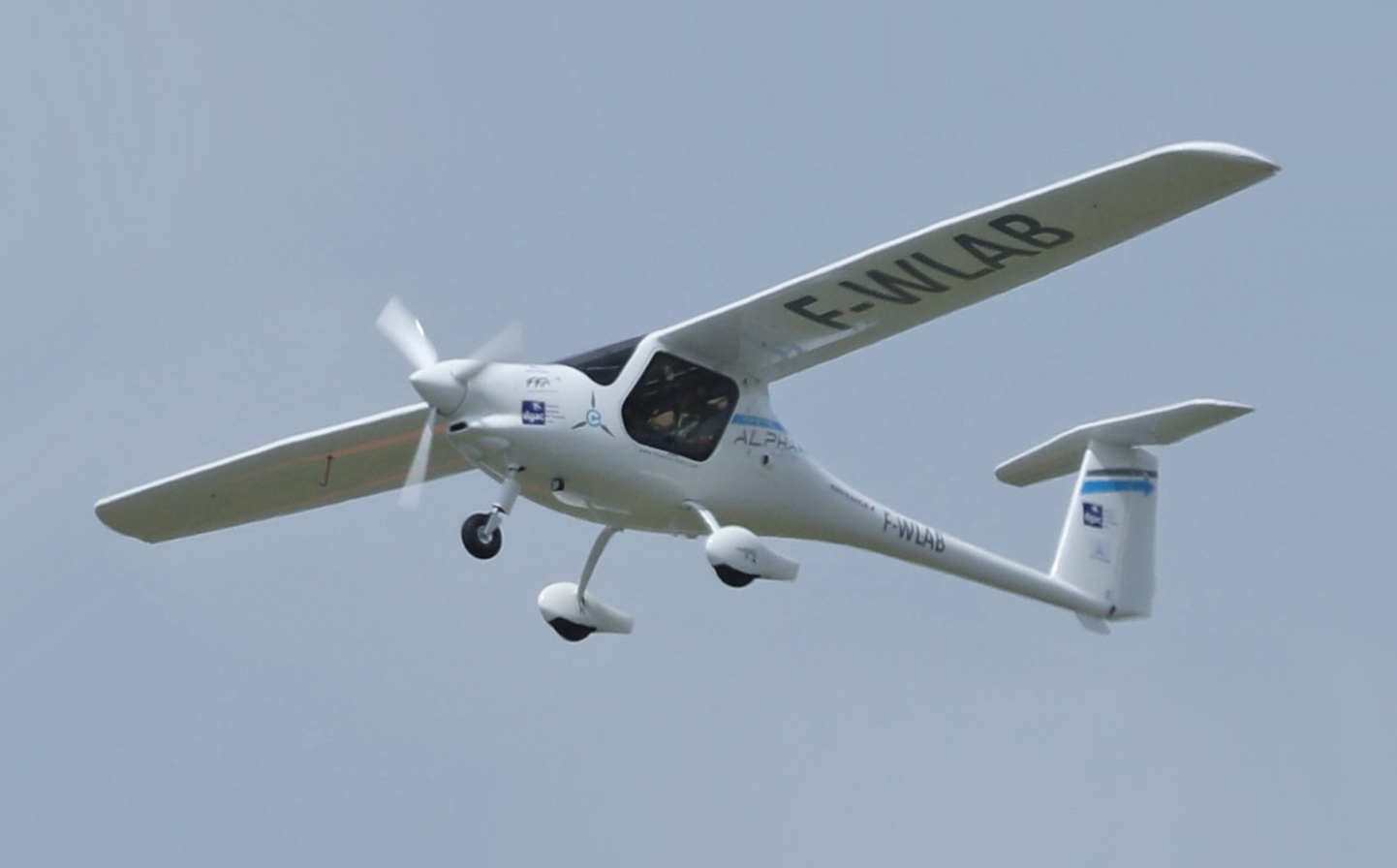
- Pipistrel Alpha in flight

General information
- Type: Light-sport aircraft
- National origin: Slovenia
- Manufacturer: Pipistrel
- Status: In production
- Number built: 500+

History
- Manufactured: May 2012 – present
- First flight: 2012
- Developed from: Pipistrel Virus

The Pipistrel Alpha Trainer is a Slovenian two-seat, single-engine light-sport aircraft intended specifically for flight training, designed and produced by Pipistrel in Gorizia, Italy.

The Alpha was announced at the end of 2011 and production started in 2012. Based on the design of the Pipistrel Virus, it is intended to be a low-cost solution for LSA flight training both in the acquisition and operating costs, while still including a full airframe emergency recovery parachute system as standard equipment.

The electric version of the Alpha Trainer was announced in 2015, and as of January 2020, it remained the only commercially available electric aeroplane in the world, with the exception of electric motorgliders.

== Design and development ==
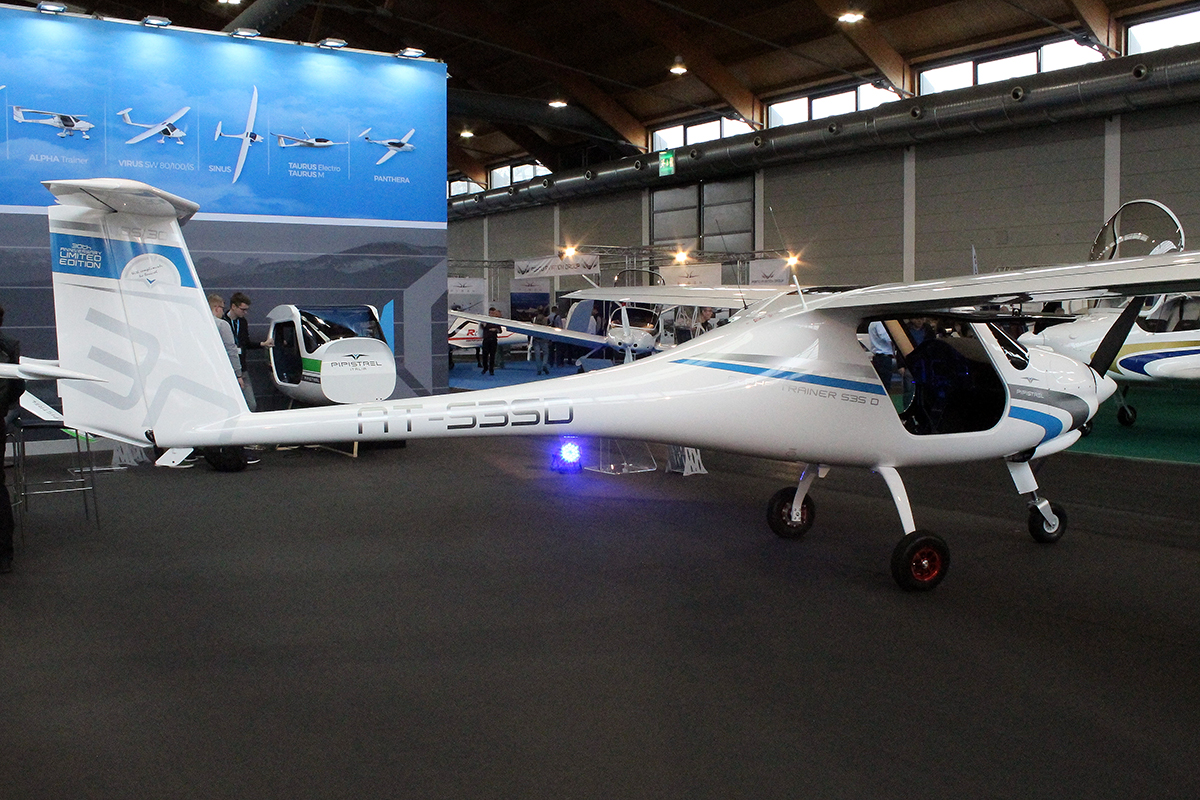
The Rotax-powered Alpha Trainer

The aircraft features a cantilever high wing, a two-seats in side-by-side configuration, tricycle landing gear, and a single 60 kW (80 hp) Rotax 912 UL engine in tractor configuration. It was designed to comply with the US light-sport aircraft rules.

The aerodynamic design is based on the Pipistrel Virus but structurally redesigned to simplify the manufacture and maintenance. The aircraft is made from single-skin laminate composite, instead of the honeycomb layup found in the Virus. The landing gear was reinforced for training use, and the main wheels' differential brakes replaced with a central brake lever between the seats. The cockpit is equipped with traditional and cheaper round-dial style flight instruments and a GPS, rather than a full glass cockpit. Air brakes are optional to offer simpler controls, and the flaperons were redesigned to have 25 degrees of flap travel for easy short-field landings.

A full airframe emergency ballistic parachute is included as standard equipment.

The fuel consumption is projected to be 9.5 L (2.5 US gal) per hour when used in the training role and conducting touch-and-go circuits. The 50 L (13 US gal) fuel tank allows an endurance of more than 4 hours.

Its initial price of US$85,000 was intended to address moves by Pipistrel's competition in raising prices on their aircraft. In particular, the Alpha's price was initially set well below the then-current US$149,000 price announced for the comparable Cessna 162. As of April 2020, the base price ranged between €65,000 (US$70,100) and €86,800 (US$93,600), depending on the country-specific regulatory requirements.

== Variants ==
=== Alpha Electro ===
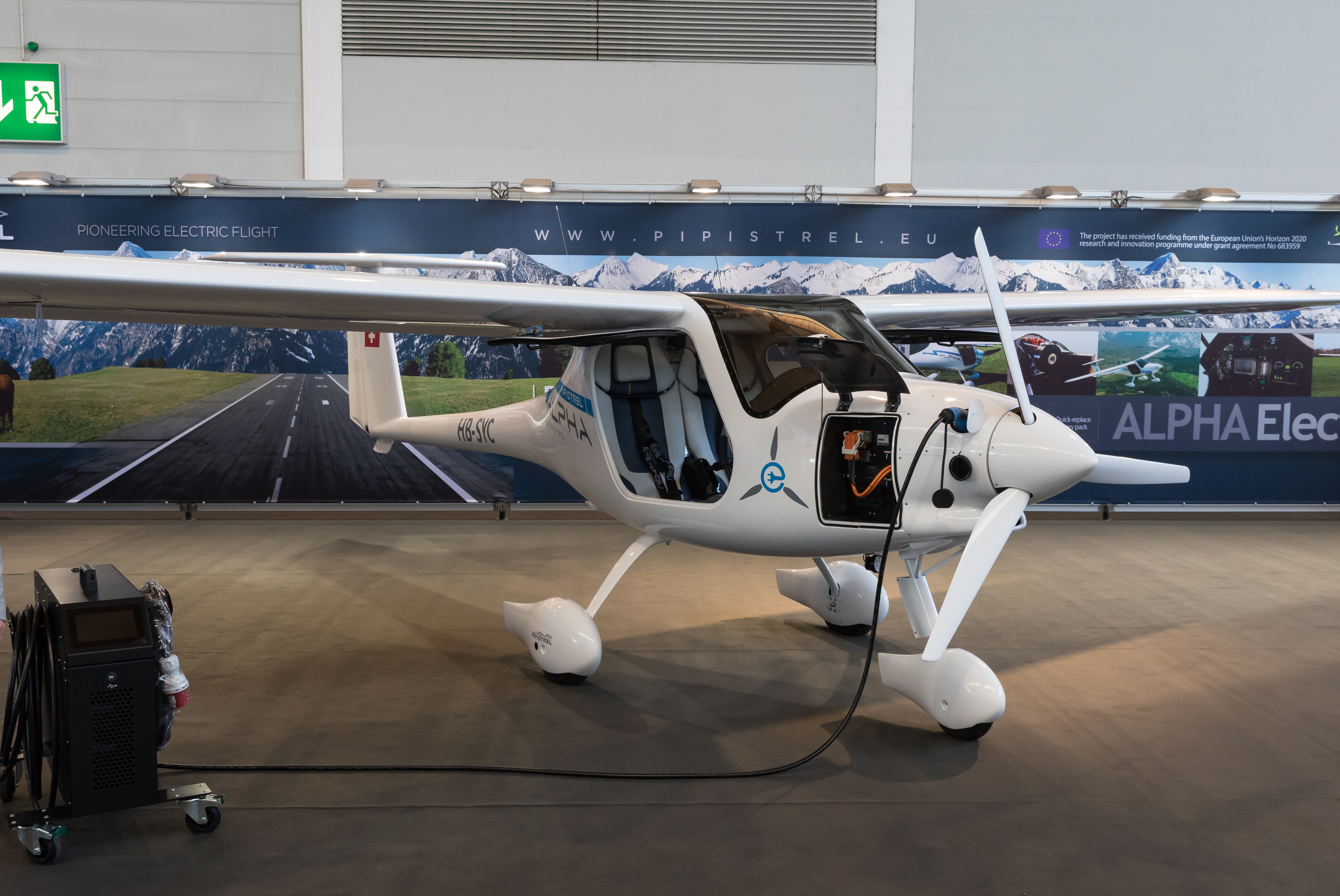
Alpha Electro

External videos
- Video: Pipistrel Alpha Electro Aero 2015
- Video: Flying Pipistrel's Electric Aeroplane

Pipistrel introduced an electric version called the Alpha Electro in 2015 at a price of 69,000 euros, with technology from the Pipistrel WATTsUP proof of concept design, for short training. It has energy for one flight hour plus reserves, and can recharge in 45 minutes or have its batteries replaced in 5 minutes. Instead of 35 kilograms (78 lb) of fuel, it has 126 kg (277 lb) of LiPo cells, however the water cooled electric motor weighs 11 kg; much less than the gasoline engine. It has a useful load of 170 kg (380 lb), whereas a Cessna 152 has between 160 and 220 kg (350–480 lb) useful load.

After 38 minutes of flying various manoeuvres, battery charge may be 25%. From the inside, the Electro is very similar to the gasoline-powered version, but from the outside, the Electro is much quieter. Electricity costs are about 1/10 of gasoline.

The Electro is now certified in the USA. In 2015 Pipistrel intended to fly the Electro from France to England two days before the Airbus E-Fan, but was prevented by Siemens. Four Electro aircraft will be used to provide flight training in Fresno, California starting in late 2017 as part of the Sustainable Aviation Project.

== Operators ==
- WorldWide Wings – 15 on order for use in the school's locations in California and Florida, United States.

== Specifications (Alpha Trainer) ==
Data from AVweb and Pipistrel

General characteristics

- Crew: 1
- Capacity: 1 passenger
- Length: 6.5 m (21 ft 4 in)
- Wingspan: 10.5 m (34 ft 5 in)
- Height: 2.05 m (6 ft 9 in)
- Wing area: 9.51 m^{2} (102.4 sq ft)
- Empty weight: 279 kg (615 lb)
- Gross weight: 550 kg (1,213 lb)
- Fuel capacity: 50 L (11 imp gal; 13 US gal)
- Powerplant: 1 × Rotax 912 UL four cylinder, horizontally opposed, four-stroke aircraft engine, 60 kW (80 hp)
- Propellers: 2-bladed Pipistrel custom wood and composite

Performance

- Maximum speed: 220 km/h (140 mph, 120 kn)
- Cruise speed: 200 km/h (124 mph, 108 kn)
- Stall speed: 80 km/h (49 mph, 43 kn) without flaps
- Never exceed speed: 250 km/h (155 mph, 135 kn)
- Range: 600 km (373 mi, 324 nmi)
- Service ceiling: 5,500 m (18,000 ft)
- g limits: +4, -2
- Rate of climb: 6.2 m/s (1,220 ft/min)

Avionics

- Garmin Aera 660 GPS

== See also ==
Related development

- Pipistrel Virus
- Pipistrel WATTsUP

Aircraft of comparable role, configuration, and era

- Cessna 162
