= Mount Campbell (California) =

Mountain summit in California

- Reedley Mountain, Watoke
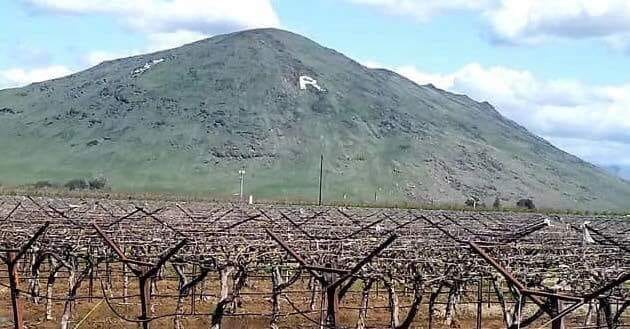
- Southwest face of Campbell Mountain, exhibiting its two hillside letters, representing Reedley and Sanger.

Highest point
- Elevation: 1,729 ft (527 m); NAVD88
- Coordinates: 36°41′50″N 119°25′09″W

Geography
- Location within California Location within the United States
- Location: Fresno County, California, U.S.
- Parent range: Sierra Nevada

Climbing
- Easiest route: Mountain Way, Jensen Avenue, South Alta Avenue

Mount Campbell is an isolated mountain summit in the Sierra Nevada foothills, located in Fresno County, California.

It is located in the center of a circle formed by the cities of Reedley (five miles to the south), Parlier (eight miles to the southwest), Sanger (seven miles to the west), Piedra (eight miles to the north), and Orange Cove (seven miles to the southeast). CA 180 runs across between Mount Campbell and the rest of the Sierra Nevada foothills. The highway runs up to Kings Canyon National Park, Mount Campbell is one of the first mountaintops that travellers meet on the journey up to the mountain range.

Mount Campbell features two hillside letters, the first of which is an "R", painted on the southern face that points towards Reedley, the second is an "S", painted on the western face towards Sanger.
