= Immanuel Schools =

Christian schools in Reedley, California

Coordinates: 36°35′49″N 119°26′55″W

- Reedley, California; United States

Information
- Type: Private
- Motto: Anchored in His Word
- Established: 1926
- Superintendent: Ryan Wood
- Mascot: Eagle
- Website: immanuelschools.com

Immanuel Schools are Mennonite schools located in Reedley, California and serving the surrounding area, including Dinuba and Kingsburg. The schools are officially dedicated to provide a religious private education on their campuses, which include a K-6 Immanuel Elementary school, a 7-8 Immanuel Junior High School, and a 9-12 Immanuel High School. Their mascot is the eagle and their school colors are white and blue.

== Overview ==
Immanuel High School was founded as a Bible School in 1926 by interested members of the Mennonite Brethren Church. the educational program was carried on in the old Sunday School building which was then located just south of the present Reedley Mennonite Brethren Church. It became the desire of the local MB Churches to educate their children in Biblical knowledge beyond the training the churches provided.

Immanuel Academy was established as a four-year high school in 1944 and moved to the present location. It became a fully accredited secondary school in 1969 by the regional accrediting agency of the Western Association of Schools and Colleges. In 1973 the Board changed the name to Immanuel High School. In 1991, Immanuel Junior High School opened with grades 7–8. The Junior High campus is located on the northeast end of the Immanuel campus. Then in 1994, it was adopted by the Immanuel High School Board to change the schools' names to Immanuel Schools, to include both junior and senior high school. In 1999 an additional classroom was moved on to the junior high campus to accommodate a self-contained 6th grade class. In the year 2000, a second classroom was added to the 6th grade.

Immanuel Elementary School Campus was completed in time for the 2017–18 school year. Prior to that, elementary classes were held at the historic Windsor Campus. Windsor District was formed as a public school serving the rural students early as 1892 and was then a wood-framed building. The Reedley Mennonite Brethren Church held services there for a time. A new brick building was built in 1923 and held their first 8th grade graduation in 1924. The Dinuba Mennonite Brethren Church used the building for a time and then built a church in Dinuba in 1936. In 1960 Windsor combined with Grandview School to become a District and eventually was annexed into Kings Canyon School District centered in Reedley. In 1994, Windsor Christian Academy began after being purchased from Kings Canyon in 1988 by a private party. In 2004, the sixth grade classes of Immanuel Junior High were moved to the Windsor Campus for the new school year of the Immanuel Elementary School at Windsor Campus. Due to structural concerns about the aging Windsor Campus, all Immanuel Elementary classes were moved to the main Reed Avenue campus in Reedley in 2011.

The three schools that comprise Immanuel are located on a 13.5-acre (55,000 m^{2}) campus overlooking the Kings River in the city of Reedley.

Immanuel Schools is a nonprofit corporation sponsored by the Mennonite Brethren Churches in the San Joaquin Valley. The sponsoring churches elect members to the Board. Approximately 35% or the Immanuel students attend these sponsoring churches. Approximately 65% of the Immanuel students attend over 100 different Christian churches representing many denominations in the area.

== Accreditation ==
Immanuel High School completed an accreditation in 2000 and received the highest accreditation possible from the Western Association of Schools and Colleges through 2023.

== Transportation ==
The transportation system runs buses as far north as Fresno, south to Visalia, west to Caruthers, and east to Orosi.
