= Kings Canyon Unified School District =

School district in California, United States

Address
- 1801 10th Street Reedley, California, 93654; United States

District information
- Established: 1965; 61 years ago
- Superintendent: John Campbell

Other information
- Website: www.kcusd.com

Kings Canyon Unified School District (KCUSD) is a school district serving schools in Reedley, Orange Cove, Dunlap, Miramonte, Squaw Valley, and Wonder Valley. It was established in 1965.

The current superintendent is John Campbell.

== Schools ==
=== Elementary ===
- Alta Elementary School
- A.L. Conner Elementary School
- Jefferson Elementary School
- Great Western Elementary School
- Washington Elementary School
- McCord Elementary School
- Lincoln Elementary School
- Sheridan Elementary School

=== K-8 schools ===
- Dunlap K-8 School
- Thomas Law Reed K-8 School
- Riverview K-8 School
- Silas Bartsch K-8 School

=== Middle schools ===
- General Grant Middle School
- Navelencia Middle School
- Citrus Middle School

=== High schools ===
- Reedley High School
- Orange Cove High School
- Dunlap Leadership Academy
- Reedley Middle College High School

=== Alternative education ===
- Kings Canyon High School
- Mountain View Independent School
