= Don Knight (actor) =

British actor (1933–1997)

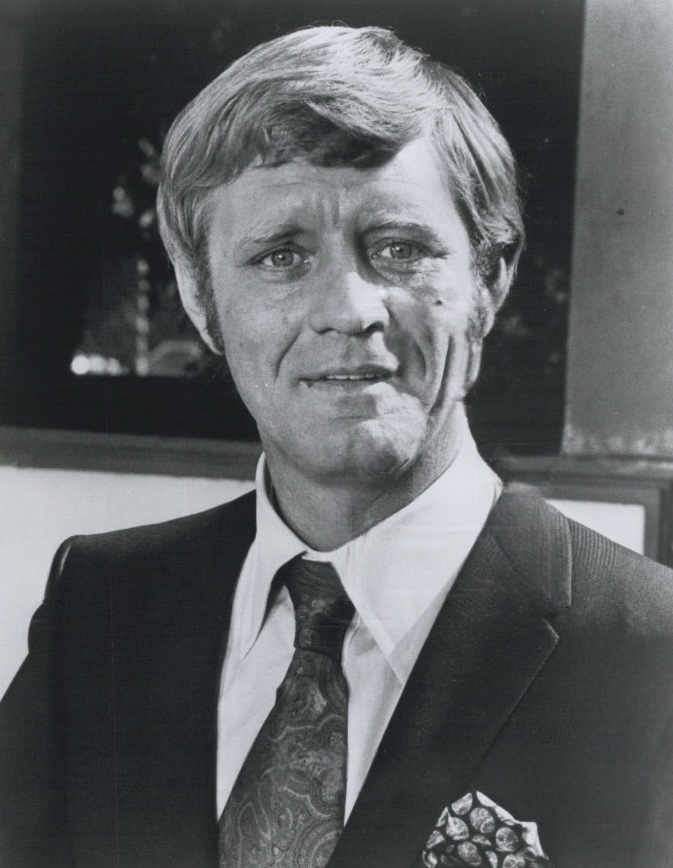
- Knight in 1970
- Born: Donald Hartwich Knight; 16 February 1933; Manchester, Lancashire, England
- Died: 18 August 1997 (aged 64); Squaw Valley, California, U.S.
- Education: Sir George Williams University; Wesley Theological Seminary
- Occupation: Actor
- Years active: 1966–1993
- Spouses: Mary Patricia Roberts (m. 1959; div. 1974) Karin Edda Joachim (m. 1975)
- Children: 2

Donald Knight (16 February 1933 – 18 August 1997) was an English-born film, television, and stage actor. He worked largely in the United States, and often played tough guys.

== Early life ==
Born in Manchester, Lancashire, he served a short stint in the British Army, and shortly afterward left England for Canada. Knight began acting at the age of seven. He studied at Sir George Williams University in Montreal, Quebec, and later at Wesley Theological Seminary in Washington, D.C. He obtained degrees in English, philosophy, theology, and drama.

== Acting career ==
In 1965, he moved to the United States to pursue acting, and was primarily a character actor, making numerous guest appearances in television series such as Combat!, The Time Tunnel, Bewitched, Hogan's Heroes, The Big Valley, Hawaii Five-O, It Takes a Thief, Bonanza, Mannix, Mission: Impossible, Columbo, Banacek, Night Gallery, Cannon, Kojak, Little House on the Prairie, and Barnaby Jones, as well as semi-regular roles in series such as The Immortal.

In 1976, he was in the Disney film Treasure of Matecumbe. His character was Skaggs.

He appeared in the PBS telefilm The Canterville Ghost. Its other distributors were WonderWorks and the Disney Channel.

== Personal life and death ==
Educated in theology, Knight became an ordained minister in 1956. During his acting career, he sometimes served as a church pastor. He was a minister at the United Church of Christ in Simi Valley, California.

Knight died on 18 August 1997 in Squaw Valley, California, following a stroke earlier that month.

== Filmography ==
Year	Title	Role	Notes
1966	Munster, Go Home!	Minor Role	Uncredited
1967	Kill a Dragon	Ian	
1968	The Hell with Heroes	Pepper	
1968	The Virginian	Cal Hobson	Season 7, episode 11 (The Mustangers)
1970	The Virginian	Henry	Season 8, episode 21 (A King’s Ransom)
1970	Too Late the Hero	Pte Connolly	
1970	The Hawaiians	Milton Overpeck	
1971	Something Big	Tommy McBride	
1973	Trader Horn	Colonel Sinclair	
1974	Little House on the Prairie	Jack Peters	
1975	The Apple Dumpling Gang	John Wintle	
1976	Treasure of Matecumbe	Skaggs	
1982	Swamp Thing	Ritter	
