= 2023–2026 biolab investigations in the United States =

Between 2023 and 2026, two home biolabs in California and Nevada were discovered, with the links between both labs subsequently investigated by the US Federal Bureau of Investigation.

== Background ==
Privately owned biological labs in the United States are regulated by a "patchwork of partially overlapping regulations that cover different types of work and exist at different levels of scale, such as the institution, city, county, state, and nation". For laboratories handling a select list of biological agents, extensive and unified federal oversight exists.

== Reedley lab ==
In late 2023, an illegal biolab was discovered in Reedley, California. The lab contained "pathogen-labeled containers", with labels that included dengue fever, HIV, and malaria, along with approximately about 1,000 mice that police believe were used as test subjects. Jia Bei Zhu, a Chinese national was subsequently arrested in October 2023 and indicted in November 2023 on charges of distributing adulterated and misbranded medical items, including coronavirus tests.

== Las Vegas lab ==
In February 2026, an illegal home biolab was raided in Las Vegas, Nevada by Las Vegas Metropolitan Police. The lab contained "multiple refrigerators, a freezer, and other laboratory-type equipment, along with numerous bottles and jugs containing unknown liquid substances" within a locked garage. Ori Solomon, an Israeli national, was arrested after police searched a second Las Vegas home, both properties believed to be managed by Solomon.

Police stated Solomon was the main "agent and conspirator" with an individual connected to the investigation into the Reedley lab.
