= Reedley High School =

Location
- 740 W. N. Ave; Reedley, California 93654; United States

Information
- Type: Public
- Motto: Together, we will reach the treasure. Success for all. Respect, Honor, Success
- Established: 1918
- Principal: John Ahlin (2017 - Present)
- Faculty: 76.44 (FTE)
- Enrollment: 1,750 (2023–2024)
- Student to teacher ratio: 22.89
- Colors: Kelly green and White
- Mascot: Pirate
- Sports: CIF Central/ Div. II/ NYL
- Website: rhs.kcusd.com

Reedley High School was established in 1918 as the first public high school in Reedley, California, and in the Kings Canyon Unified School District. It serves as one of five high schools in the district.

== Admissions ==
Approximately 1,836 students attend Reedley High. The racial makeup of the school is 47% White, >1% Black or African American, >1% Native American, 2% Asian, 1% Filipino, and 1% from other races. 48% of the population is Hispanic or Latino.

== Athletics ==
The school's mascot is the Mighty Pirate also known as Pete the Pirate. The RHS school colors are Kelly green and white. Reedley High School competes in the CIF Central Section and Tri-County Athletic Conference. Sports at RHS include:

	Fall	Winter	Spring
Boys	Cross Country	Basketball	Baseball
	Football	Soccer	Track & Field
	Water Polo	Wrestling	Golf
			Swimming & Diving
			Volleyball
			Tennis
Girls	Cross Country	Basketball	Softball
	Volleyball	Soccer	Track & Field
	Golf		Badminton
	Tennis		Swimming & Diving
	Water Polo		

== Notable alumni ==
- Silas Bartsch, school administrator
