= Immanuel High School =

Coordinates: 36°35′11.7″N 119°27′26.5″W

- Reedley, California; United States

Information
- Type: Private, Christian
- Established: 1944
- Superintendent: Ryan Wood
- Principal: Phil Goertzen
- Grades: 9-12
- Enrollment: 332
- International students: Yes
- Language: English
- Schedule type: Rotating Drop
- Colors: Blue and White
- Athletics: CIF Central Section
- Mascot: Otis the Eagle
- Website: www.immanuelschools.com

Immanuel High School is a Christian high school located in Reedley, California. The school is a private Christian school that serves Fresno County and Tulare County. It is one of the Immanuel Schools.

== Athletics ==
The school's mascot is the Eagle. The IHS school colors are Spotless White, Red and Royal Blue. Immanuel High School participates in sports in the CIF Central Section and plays in the Tri-County Athletic Conference. They have won many CIF Div. IV & V Valley Championships and a few State Championships. The sports at IHS include:

	Fall	Winter	Spring
Boys	Football	Basketball	Baseball
	Cross Country	Soccer	Tennis
		Wrestling	Golf
			Swimming & Diving
Girls	Volleyball	Basketball	Softball
	Tennis	Soccer	Swimming & Diving
			Golf

== Notable alumni ==
- Kasey Knevelbaard (class of 2015), track and field athlete
