= Orange Cove station =

United States historic place

Orange Cove
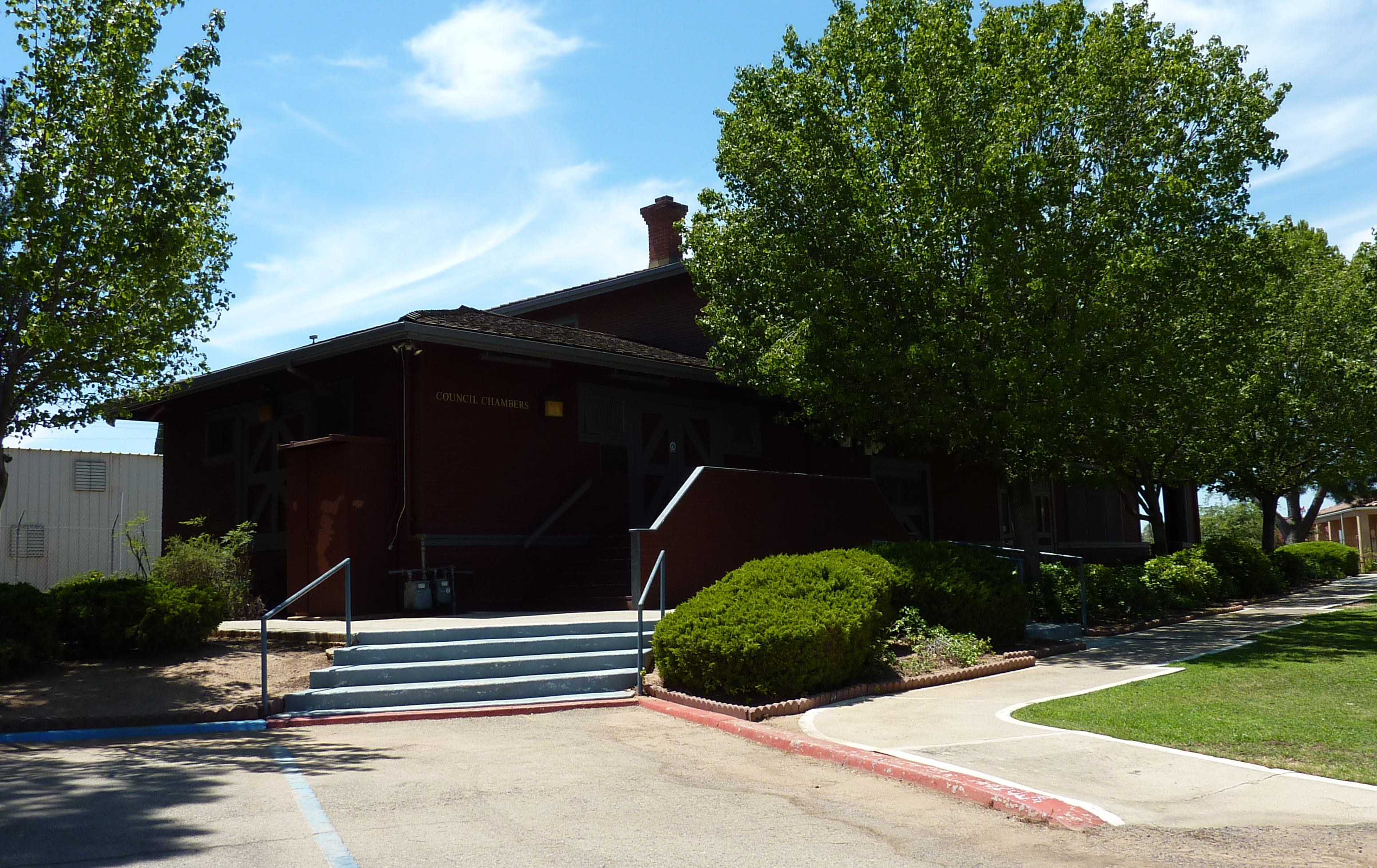

General information
- Location: 633 East Railroad Avenue; Orange Cove, California

History
- Opened: 1913
- Closed: October 14, 1977
- Orange Cove Santa Fe Railway Depot
- U.S. National Register of Historic Places
- Coordinates: 36.623225°N 119.313028°W
- Area: 1.5 acres (0.61 ha)
- Built: 1913
- NRHP reference No.: 78000668
- Added to NRHP: August 29, 1978
Location

Orange Cove station is a former train station in Orange Cove, California.

== History ==
The depot was built in 1913 by the Atchison, Topeka and Santa Fe Railway. It was constructed to a standard design and cost $8,000 (equivalent to $260,606 in 2025). The depot spurred nearby growth and the town of Orange Cove formed around the station. Through the 1930s, rail proved to be the premier method of freight shipment in the San Joaquin Valley.

The depot finally closed on October 14, 1977. It was listed on the National Register of Historic Places on August 29, 1978. The station building serves as Orange Cove City Hall.
