= Miramonte, California =

Unincorporated community in Fresno County, California, US

Miramonte
- Unincorporated community
- Location in California Miramonte (the United States)
- Coordinates: 36°41′33″N 119°03′08″W
- Country: United States
- State: California
- County: Fresno
- Elevation: 3,094 ft (943 m)
- ZIP code: 93641
- Area code: 559

Miramonte (/ˌmɪərəˈmɒnti/; Spanish for "Mountain View") is an unincorporated community in Fresno County, California, United States. It is located on Mill Creek, 5 miles (8 km) southeast of Dunlap, at an elevation of 3094 feet (943 m).

== History ==
The Miramonte community was known as Rancho Miramontes in the 1800s.

The first Miramonte post office opened in 1909, was discontinued in 1912, and re-established in 1923.
