= Orange Cove, California =

City in California, United States

- City
- City of Orange Cove
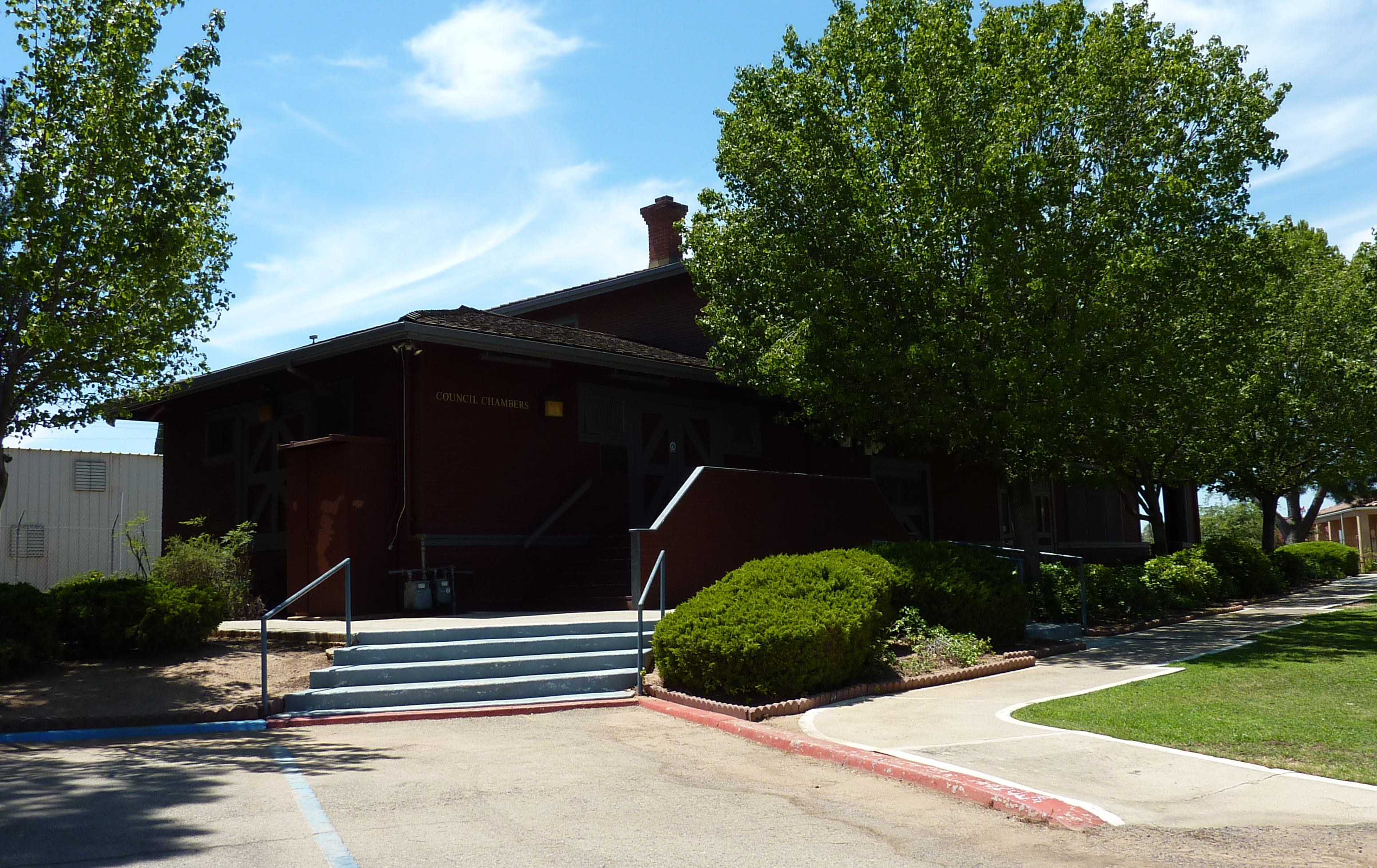
- City Hall located in the former Orange Cove Santa Fe Railway Depot

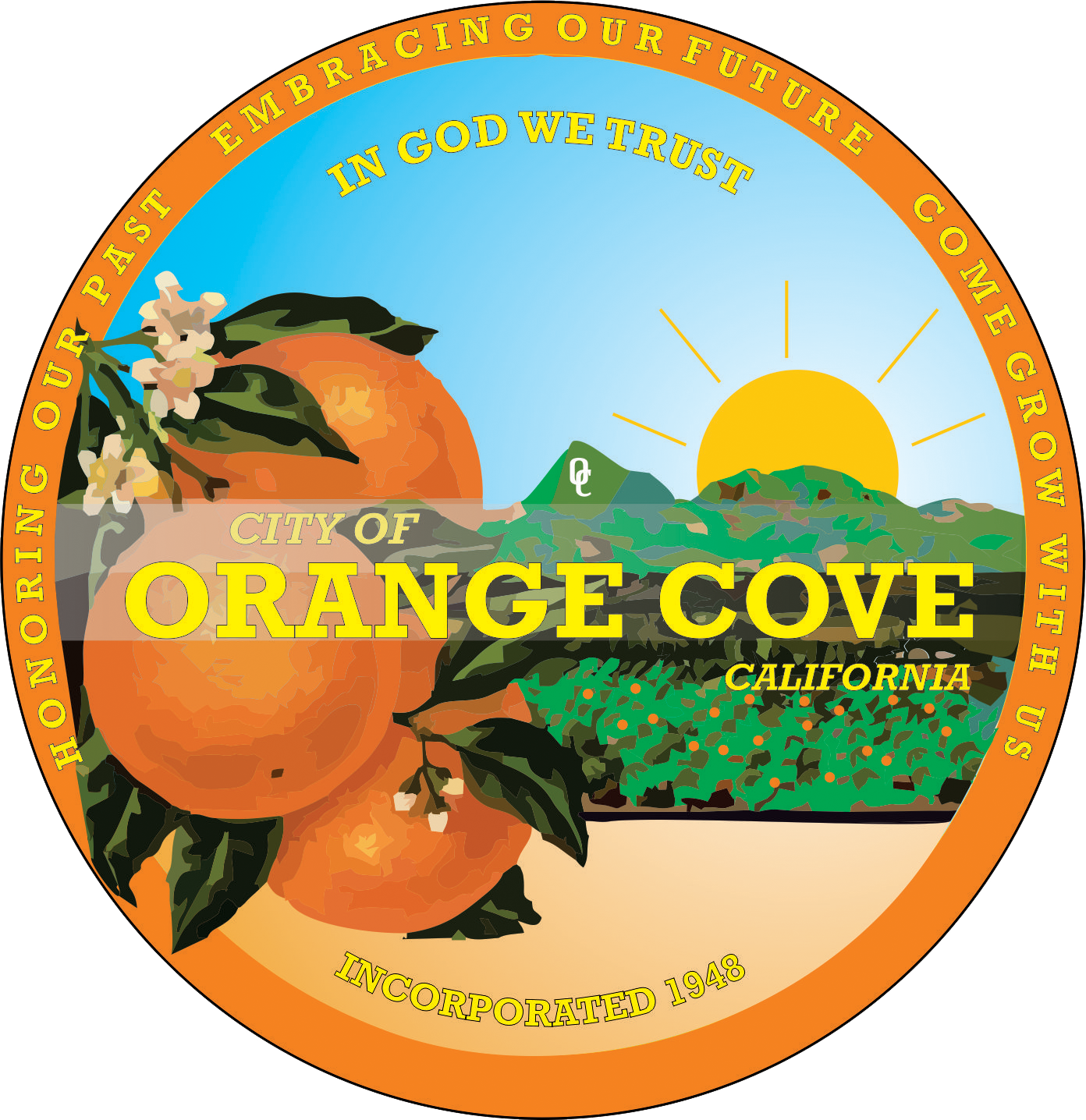
- Official Seal
- Interactive map of Orange Cove, California
- Location in the United States
- Coordinates: 36°37′28″N 119°18′49″W
- Country: United States
- State: California
- County: Fresno
- Incorporated: January 20, 1948

Government
  - Mayor: Diana Guerra Silva
  - Mayor Pro Tem: Gilbert Garcia
  - State Senator: Anna Caballero (D)
  - Assemblymember: Joaquin Arambula (D)
  - U. S. Rep.: Jim Costa (D)

Area
  - Total: 1.79 sq mi (4.64 km^{2})
  - Land: 1.79 sq mi (4.64 km^{2})
  - Water: 0 sq mi (0.00 km^{2}) 0%
- Elevation: 423 ft (129 m)

Population (2020)
  - Total: 9,649
  - Density: 5,390/sq mi (2,080/km^{2})
- Time zone: UTC-8 (PST)
  - Summer (DST): UTC-7 (PDT)
- ZIP codes: 93646, 93675
- Area code: 559
- FIPS code: 06-54008
- GNIS feature IDs: 277569, 2411327
- Website: www.cityoforangecove.com

Orange Cove is a city in Fresno County, California, United States. The population was 9,649 at the 2020 census, up from 9,078 at the 2010 census.

== Description ==
Almost all of Orange Cove's residents are Hispanic, many of them farmers. Orange Cove is located in the San Joaquin Valley, 8 miles (13 km) east-northeast of Reedley, at an elevation of 423 feet (129 m).

== Geography ==
According to the United States Census Bureau, the city has a total area of 1.8 square miles (4.7 km^{2}), all land.

=== Climate ===
According to the Köppen Climate Classification system, Orange Cove has a hot-summer Mediterranean climate, abbreviated "Csa" on climate maps.

== History ==
Elmer M. Sheridan founded the town in 1914, and named it prior to large scale citrus growing. The first post office opened in 1914. The city incorporated in 1948.

== Demographics ==
Historical population
Census	Pop.	Note	%±
1950	2,392		—
1960	2,885		20.6%
1970	3,392		17.6%
1980	4,027		18.7%
1990	5,608		39.3%
2000	7,721		37.7%
2010	9,073		17.5%
2020	9,649		6.3%
U.S. Decennial Census

=== 2020 census ===
As of the 2020 census, Orange Cove had a population of 9,649. The population density was 5,384.5 inhabitants per square mile (2,079.0/km^{2}). The census reported that 99.7% of the population lived in households, 0.3% lived in non-institutionalized group quarters, and no one was institutionalized. 99.9% of residents lived in urban areas, while 0.1% lived in rural areas.

The age distribution was 35.2% under the age of 18, 11.8% aged 18 to 24, 25.7% aged 25 to 44, 18.7% aged 45 to 64, and 8.5% who were 65 years of age or older. The median age was 27.0 years. For every 100 females, there were 97.6 males, and for every 100 females age 18 and over there were 93.4 males age 18 and over.

There were 2,405 households, out of which 62.1% had children under the age of 18 living in them. Of all households, 51.0% were married-couple households, 8.1% were cohabiting couple households, 12.9% were households with a male householder and no spouse or partner present, and 28.1% were households with a female householder and no spouse or partner present. About 8.7% of households were made up of individuals, and 3.5% had someone living alone who was 65 years of age or older. The average household size was 4.0. There were 2,112 families (87.8% of all households).

There were 2,481 housing units at an average density of 1,384.5 units per square mile (534.6 units/km^{2}), of which 2,405 (96.9%) were occupied. Of occupied units, 40.5% were owner-occupied and 59.5% were renter-occupied. 3.1% of housing units were vacant. The homeowner vacancy rate was 0.5% and the rental vacancy rate was 2.4%.

Racial composition as of the 2020 census
Race	Number	Percent
White	2,201	22.8%
Black or African American	51	0.5%
American Indian and Alaska Native	143	1.5%
Asian	73	0.8%
Native Hawaiian and Other Pacific Islander	9	0.1%
Some other race	5,320	55.1%
Two or more races	1,852	19.2%
Hispanic or Latino (of any race)	9,159	94.9%

=== Demographic estimates ===
In 2023, the US Census Bureau estimated that 34.3% of the population were foreign-born. Of all people aged 5 or older, 21.5% spoke only English at home, 78.3% spoke Spanish, and 0.2% spoke Asian or Pacific Islander languages. Of those aged 25 or older, 48.2% were high school graduates and 11.2% had a bachelor's degree.

=== Income and poverty ===
The median household income in 2023 was $38,447, and the per capita income was $14,379. About 39.4% of families and 39.0% of the population were below the poverty line.

=== 2010 census ===
At the 2010 census Orange Cove had a population of 9,078. The population density was 4,748.6 people per square mile (1,800/km^{2}). The racial makeup of Orange Cove was 3,940 (43.4%) White, 72 (0.8%) African American, 131 (1.4%) Native American, 101 (1.1%) Asian, 3 (0.03%) Pacific Islander, 4,481 (49.4%) from other races, and 350 (3.9%) from two or more races. Hispanic or Latino of any race were 8,413 persons (92.7%).

The census reported that 9,078 people (100% of the population) lived in households, no one lived in non-institutionalized group quarters and no one was institutionalized.

There were 2,068 households, out of which 1,459 (70.6%) had children under the age of 18 living in them, 1,202 (58.1%) were opposite-sex married couples living together, 430 (20.8%) had a single female householder, 222 (10.7%) had a single male householder. There were 207 (10%) unmarried opposite-sex partnerships, and 10 (0.5%) same-sex married couples or partnerships. 174 households (8.4%) were one person and 88 (4.3%) had someone living alone who was 65 or older. The average household size was 4.39. There were 1,854 families (89.7% of all households); the average family size was 4.53.

The age distribution was 3,619 people (39.9%) under the age of 18, 1,113 people (12.3%) aged 18 to 24, 2,398 people (26.4%) aged 25 to 44, 1,435 people (15.8%) aged 45 to 64, and 513 people (5.7%) who were 65 or older. The median age was 23.6 years. For every 100 females, there were 100.9 males. For every 100 females age 18 and over, there were 100.1 males.

There were 2,231 housing units at an average density of 1,167.0 per square mile (450/km^{2}), of which 2,068 were occupied, of which 893 (43.2%) were owner-occupied, and 1,175 (56.8%) were occupied by renters. The homeowner vacancy rate was 0.8%; the rental vacancy rate was 9.5%. 4,047 people (44.6% of the population) lived in owner-occupied housing units and 5,031 people (55.4%) lived in rental housing units.

== Municipal government ==
Orange Cove's local government includes an elected mayor, mayor pro tem, and a three-member city council. As of 2025, its current mayor is Diana Guerra Silva. A previous mayor, Victor P. Lopez, was mayor of Orange Cove for over three decades before being voted out of office in 2010. He was later elected to the city council in 2013 and re-elected as mayor in 2014 in what he claimed would be his last term in office, but he then went on to win re-election as mayor again in 2018.

== Police department ==
The community of Orange Cove maintained its own police department for many years. In 1992 however, the city disbanded its police department, due to an inadequate budget and began contracting with the Fresno County Sheriff's Department for police services.

As of December 16, 2009, the city restarted its police department. Frank Steenport was the Chief. Later, Marty Rivera became the Chief of Police.

== Education ==
Schools in Orange Cove are part of the Kings Canyon Unified School District. Orange Cove has one High School (Orange Cove High School) and Middle School (Citrus Middle School) as well as three Elementary Schools: Sheridan Elementary School, McCord Elementary School, and A.L. Conner Elementary School.

== Parks ==
- U.S Senator Dianne Feinstein Park
- P. Rod Skate Park
- BMX Park
- Sheridan Park
- James O. Eaton Memorial Park, Javier Bejar Memorial

== Health care ==
- Adventist Health Medical Office
- United Health Centers of the San Joaquin Valley

== Transportation ==
Orange Cove is served by State Route 63 (SR 63), which approaches the city from Orosi. SR 63 bypasses the city along Hills Valley Road, while straddling the Fresno–Tulare county line, and continues north toward SR 180. Hills Valley Road continues south as County Route J19, which connects to Reedley (via Manning Avenue) and Dinuba.

Orange Cove was formerly served by the Atchison, Topeka and Santa Fe Railway along its Porterville-Orosi District branch line. The station serving this line was listed on the National Register of Historic Places in 1978.

== See also ==
- List of towns in California
