= Dunlap, California =

Unincorporated community in California, United States

Dunlap
- Unincorporated community
- Location in California Dunlap (the United States)
- Coordinates: 36°44′18″N 119°07′15″W
- Country: United States
- State: California
- County: Fresno
- Elevation: 1,919 ft (585 m)

Dunlap is an unincorporated community in Fresno County, California, United States. It lies at an elevation of 1,919 ft (585 m). Dunlap has a population of 131. It is located approximately 38 miles (61 km) east of Fresno. In the 1800s Dunlap was a rest stop for passengers of the stage coach and a location for a change of horses.

St. Nicholas Ranch, a conference and retreat center run by the Greek Orthodox Church, is a major attraction. The Greek Orthodox Monastery (Convent) of the Theotokos, the Life-Giving Spring is also located there. Prior to the acquisition of the land by the ranch and the monastery, the land was known as the Sally K Ranch with two of the old ranch dwellings now being occupied by the ranch manager and assigned clergy. On the ranch property itself, there is an old barn, totally constructed of redwood, with a chapel inside (on the second floor). Referred to as "The Barn Church" or "St. Nicolas Chapel" by locals, the chapel has a minimalist design, and is home to a colony of bats. The extremely large barn itself was built in 1891 to house livestock, with the chapel being a much more recent addition. In the late 1800s the large barn was also used to store ice for the city of Fresno; the ice was cut in the winter, reportedly at nearby Hume Lake, and then the large blocks were moved to the barn. Although the barn is no longer used for livestock, the original enclosures are still there.

An attraction near to Dunlap on Highway 180 is the Sierra Endangered Cat Haven. The ZIP Code is 93621, and the community is served by area code 559.

The first post office was established in 1882, was closed for a time in 1885, and moved in 1898. The name honors George Dunlap Moss, a school teacher instrumental in bringing a post office to the town.

Hye Camp, which was formerly owned by Olympian Bob Mathias, is now owned and operated by the Armenian Church of the Western Diocese as a youth camp and retreat center.

A female intern-volunteer was killed on March 6, 2013, by a lion at the Sierra Endangered Cat Haven animal park. The lion escaped from a feeding cage and attacked while she was cleaning his enclosure.

== Climate ==
The Köppen Climate Classification subtype for this climate is "Csb" (Mediterranean Climate).
