= 1932 United States presidential election in California =

- November 8, 1932
- Turnout: 80.65% (of registered voters) ▲0.87 pp 65.22% (of eligible voters) ▲8.24 pp

Nominee	Franklin D. Roosevelt	Herbert Hoover
Party	Democratic	Republican
Home state	New York	California
Running mate	John Nance Garner	Charles Curtis
Electoral vote	22	0
Popular vote	1,324,157	847,902
Percentage	58.39%	37.39%
County results
Roosevelt
40–50%
50–60%
60–70%
70–80%
Hoover
50–60%
President before election
Herbert Hoover
Republican
Elected President
Franklin D. Roosevelt
Democratic

The 1932 United States presidential election in California took place on November 8, 1932, as part of the 1932 United States presidential election. State voters chose 22 representatives, or electors, to the Electoral College, who voted for president and vice president.

California voted for the Democratic challenger, New York Governor Franklin Roosevelt, in a landslide over the Republican incumbent, Herbert Hoover, carrying every county except Riverside.

Roosevelt became the first Democrat to gain an absolute majority of the vote in California since Franklin Pierce in 1852, and in winning all but one county he broke numerous long streaks of Republican dominance. (Note: William Howard Taft, the national Republican nominee, was not on the ballot in California in 1912, but those counties won by Theodore Roosevelt in that election are counted as part of these streaks.) Alpine and Orange counties had never voted Democratic before this election, Alameda County had last voted for a Democrat in 1856, Humboldt County had not gone Democratic since Stephen Douglas carried it in 1860, San Bernardino and Santa Clara counties had not voted Democratic since Horatio Seymour in 1868, and the last Democrat to have carried Los Angeles County was Samuel J. Tilden in 1876. Finally, Del Norte County had not backed a Democrat since Grover Cleveland in 1892.

FDR's victory was the first of five consecutive Democratic victories in the state, as California would not vote Republican again until Dwight Eisenhower won the state in 1952. This would also be the last time until 1992 that a non-incumbent Democrat would carry California in a presidential election. As of 2024, Alameda County and San Francisco have voted Democratic in every subsequent election except 1952 and 1956, while Yolo County has been carried by the Democratic candidate in every subsequent election except 1952.

== Results ==
General Election Results
Party	Pledged to	Elector	Votes
Democratic Party	Franklin D. Roosevelt	Anne Banning	1,324,157
Democratic Party	Franklin D. Roosevelt	Edward W. Cahill	1,322,261
Democratic Party	Franklin D. Roosevelt	John P. Carter	1,322,095
Democratic Party	Franklin D. Roosevelt	Charles L. Culbert	1,321,953
Democratic Party	Franklin D. Roosevelt	P. J. Conkling	1,321,926
Democratic Party	Franklin D. Roosevelt	Peter J. Haggerty	1,321,817
Democratic Party	Franklin D. Roosevelt	John T. Gaffey	1,321,810
Democratic Party	Franklin D. Roosevelt	Charles O. Dunbar	1,321,792
Democratic Party	Franklin D. Roosevelt	R. F. Del Valle	1,321,768
Democratic Party	Franklin D. Roosevelt	J. Ed Hughes	1,321,713
Democratic Party	Franklin D. Roosevelt	Henry E. Harwood	1,321,695
Democratic Party	Franklin D. Roosevelt	Clara H. Heller	1,321,605
Democratic Party	Franklin D. Roosevelt	Nicola Giulii	1,321,574
Democratic Party	Franklin D. Roosevelt	John Stephen McGroarty	1,321,539
Democratic Party	Franklin D. Roosevelt	W. R. Jacobs	1,321,538
Democratic Party	Franklin D. Roosevelt	Mattison B. Jones	1,321,535
Democratic Party	Franklin D. Roosevelt	John E. King	1,321,494
Democratic Party	Franklin D. Roosevelt	Patrick Francis O'Rourke	1,321,446
Democratic Party	Franklin D. Roosevelt	Calvin L. Russell	1,321,330
Democratic Party	Franklin D. Roosevelt	Jackson H. Ralston	1,321,295
Democratic Party	Franklin D. Roosevelt	George M. Spicer	1,321,013
Democratic Party	Franklin D. Roosevelt	Mary Marshall Wiley	1,320,356
Republican Party	Herbert Hoover	Carlos S. Stanley	847,902
Republican Party	Herbert Hoover	Richard M. Tobin	847,113
Republican Party	Herbert Hoover	Harry A. Milton	847,028
Republican Party	Herbert Hoover	Ruth Comfort Mitchell Young	847,017
Republican Party	Herbert Hoover	Herbert Kerrigan	847,005
Republican Party	Herbert Hoover	George C. Pardee	846,991
Republican Party	Herbert Hoover	J. L. Elizabeth Lawless	846,976
Republican Party	Herbert Hoover	Robert Freeman	846,950
Republican Party	Herbert Hoover	Hugh McNulty	846,949
Republican Party	Herbert Hoover	George W. Clyde	846,926
Republican Party	Herbert Hoover	John F. Slavich	846,919
Republican Party	Herbert Hoover	Mrs. Max Sloss	846,888
Republican Party	Herbert Hoover	Edward H. Ahlswede	846,845
Republican Party	Herbert Hoover	Ralph E. Smith	846,731
Republican Party	Herbert Hoover	Alfred L. Bartlett	846,627
Republican Party	Herbert Hoover	Harry J. Tremaine	846,598
Republican Party	Herbert Hoover	Edwin A. Meserve	846,553
Republican Party	Herbert Hoover	E. P. Clarke	846,521
Republican Party	Herbert Hoover	James W. Hanberry	846,515
Republican Party	Herbert Hoover	Cora A. Shaw	846,515
Republican Party	Herbert Hoover	John F. Forward Jr.	846,394
Republican Party	Herbert Hoover	Helen Mattewson	846,062
Socialist Party	Norman Thomas	Upton Sinclair	63,299
Socialist Party	Norman Thomas	George R. Kirkpatrick	63,076
Socialist Party	Norman Thomas	Elbert E. Porter	63,032
Socialist Party	Norman Thomas	Kate C. Gatz	63,012
Socialist Party	Norman Thomas	Aaron Shapiro	63,012
Socialist Party	Norman Thomas	Samuel Wisenberg	62,990
Socialist Party	Norman Thomas	Ethelwyn Mills	62,982
Socialist Party	Norman Thomas	Samuel S. White	62,980
Socialist Party	Norman Thomas	Elijah Nackus	62,979
Socialist Party	Norman Thomas	Adam Gladys	62,979
Socialist Party	Norman Thomas	Harry Sherr	62,978
Socialist Party	Norman Thomas	Agnes H. Downing	62,977
Socialist Party	Norman Thomas	Isaac C. Ruby	62,974
Socialist Party	Norman Thomas	Casimir I. Olexiewicz	62,967
Socialist Party	Norman Thomas	Forrest J. Voorhie	62,966
Socialist Party	Norman Thomas	Joseph Porton	62,964
Socialist Party	Norman Thomas	Harvey R. Edward	62,962
Socialist Party	Norman Thomas	Althea M. Page	62,956
Socialist Party	Norman Thomas	Robert B. Whitaker	62,950
Socialist Party	Norman Thomas	Blanche F. Tipton	62,944
Socialist Party	Norman Thomas	Addie M. Benedict	62,942
Socialist Party	Norman Thomas	George A. Garrett	62,922
Prohibition Party	William D. Upshaw	M. Len Hutchins	20,637
Prohibition Party	William D. Upshaw	Ethel G. Hubler	20,443
Prohibition Party	William D. Upshaw	John C. Bell	20,388
Prohibition Party	William D. Upshaw	Allie Simmons Wheeler	20,382
Prohibition Party	William D. Upshaw	H. A. Johnson	20,373
Prohibition Party	William D. Upshaw	Dana G. Boleyn	20,340
Prohibition Party	William D. Upshaw	William H. Moore	20,318
Prohibition Party	William D. Upshaw	Thomas H. James	20,313
Prohibition Party	William D. Upshaw	O. U. Hull	20,311
Prohibition Party	William D. Upshaw	W. M. Nanney	20,300
Prohibition Party	William D. Upshaw	J. S. Edwards	20,299
Prohibition Party	William D. Upshaw	James P. M. Jensen	20,272
Prohibition Party	William D. Upshaw	J. L. Rollins	20,264
Prohibition Party	William D. Upshaw	Joseph Fusch	20,263
Prohibition Party	William D. Upshaw	Minnie Goldthwaite	20,260
Prohibition Party	William D. Upshaw	W. P. Fassett	20,256
Prohibition Party	William D. Upshaw	M. Shelton	20,252
Prohibition Party	William D. Upshaw	L. E. Blochman	20,240
Prohibition Party	William D. Upshaw	G. Rath	20,239
Prohibition Party	William D. Upshaw	M. E. Leaves	20,237
Prohibition Party	William D. Upshaw	Lura Hyden Boleyn	20,213
Prohibition Party	William D. Upshaw	O. Oxendine	20,191
Liberty Party	William Hope Harvey	Walter E. Owen	9,827
Liberty Party	William Hope Harvey	George D. Patrick	9,770
Liberty Party	William Hope Harvey	Van Dyke Todd	9,702
Liberty Party	William Hope Harvey	Warner Abbey	9,701
Liberty Party	William Hope Harvey	James V. Lippitt	9,696
Liberty Party	William Hope Harvey	Roy E. Silvers	9,694
Liberty Party	William Hope Harvey	Grace M. Baker	9,687
Liberty Party	William Hope Harvey	Clair P. Catterlin	9,683
Liberty Party	William Hope Harvey	Edmond B. Clark	9,683
Liberty Party	William Hope Harvey	Peter C. Christensen	9,675
Liberty Party	William Hope Harvey	Emily Blanton	9,666
Liberty Party	William Hope Harvey	Oliver C. Campbelle	9,666
Liberty Party	William Hope Harvey	H. V. Haney	9,665
Liberty Party	William Hope Harvey	A. R. Blanton	9,663
Liberty Party	William Hope Harvey	Sarah E. Dyer	9,658
Liberty Party	William Hope Harvey	LeRoy E. Enos	9,655
Liberty Party	William Hope Harvey	George Felsing	9,654
Liberty Party	William Hope Harvey	Paul Holmes	9,654
Liberty Party	William Hope Harvey	Halbert E. Higbee	9,650
Liberty Party	William Hope Harvey	J. W. Wemple	9,650
Liberty Party	William Hope Harvey	Isla I. Bates	9,649
Liberty Party	William Hope Harvey	George House	9,642
Write-in		William Z. Foster (Note: Since California voted for electors directly, these votes were for Foster specifically and not the Communist ticket, which was not on the ballot in the state)	1,023
Write-in		James Ford (Note: Ford was Foster's running mate on the national Communist ticket. Ford's votes closely mirror those of Foster so voters who wrote in Foster almost certainly simultaneously wrote in Ford. Voters were entitled to choose up to 22 names on a general ticket, so separately writing in Foster and Ford would have been allowed.)	994
Write-in		Scattering	127
Votes cast (Note: Based on totals for highest elector on each ticket)			2,267,966

=== Results by county ===
County	Franklin D. Roosevelt Democratic		Herbert Hoover Republican		Norman Thomas Socialist		William D. Upshaw Prohibition		William H. Harvey Liberty		William Z. Foster Communist		Scattering (Note: Includes the write-in votes for Ford) Write-in		Margin		Total votes cast (Note: Based on the highest elector on each ticket)
County	#	%	#	%	#	%	#	%	#	%	#	%	#	%	#	%	Total votes cast
Alameda	106,388	52.04%	89,303	43.68%	6,598	3.23%	1,146	0.56%	790	0.39%	111	0.05%	116 (Note: 108 for James Ford)	0.06%	17,085	8.36%	204,452
Alpine	56	50.00%	53	47.32%	2	1.79%	0	0.00%	1	0.89%	0	0.00%	0	0.00%	3	2.68%	112
Amador	2,367	72.97%	822	25.34%	23	0.71%	10	0.31%	22	0.68%	0	0.00%	0	0.00%	1,545	47.63%	3,244
Butte	9,645	65.03%	4,322	29.14%	524	3.53%	154	1.04%	187	1.26%	0	0.00%	0	0.00%	5,323	35.89%	14,832
Calaveras	1,744	67.10%	754	29.01%	66	2.54%	14	0.54%	21	0.81%	0	0.00%	0	0.00%	990	38.09%	2,599
Colusa	2,752	69.11%	1,095	27.50%	32	0.80%	65	1.63%	38	0.95%	0	0.00%	0	0.00%	1,657	41.61%	3,982
Contra Costa	17,218	58.94%	10,907	37.33%	811	2.78%	144	0.49%	91	0.31%	21	0.07%	22 (Note: 22 for James Ford)	0.08%	6,311	21.60%	29,214
Del Norte	1,319	64.06%	637	30.94%	72	3.50%	5	0.24%	26	1.26%	0	0.00%	0	0.00%	682	33.12%	2,059
El Dorado	3,034	73.37%	956	23.12%	84	2.03%	26	0.63%	35	0.85%	0	0.00%	0	0.00%	2,078	50.25%	4,135
Fresno	32,528	69.90%	12,134	26.07%	1,211	2.60%	545	1.17%	119	0.26%	0	0.00%	0	0.00%	20,394	43.82%	46,537
Glenn	2,973	65.07%	1,432	31.34%	73	1.60%	56	1.23%	35	0.77%	0	0.00%	0	0.00%	1,541	33.73%	4,569
Humboldt	8,723	54.20%	6,795	42.22%	325	2.02%	114	0.71%	95	0.59%	21	0.13%	22 (Note: 22 for James Ford)	0.14%	1,928	11.98%	16,095
Imperial	8,772	67.28%	3,783	29.01%	274	2.10%	175	1.34%	35	0.27%	0	0.00%	0	0.00%	4,989	38.26%	13,039
Inyo	1,459	64.61%	698	30.91%	64	2.83%	10	0.44%	27	1.20%	0	0.00%	0	0.00%	761	33.70%	2,258
Kern	19,634	70.32%	7,011	25.11%	962	3.45%	176	0.63%	137	0.49%	0	0.00%	0	0.00%	12,623	45.21%	27,920
Kings	5,191	69.05%	2,009	26.72%	146	1.94%	123	1.64%	49	0.65%	0	0.00%	0	0.00%	3,182	42.33%	7,518
Lake	2,344	62.61%	1,301	34.75%	60	1.60%	26	0.69%	13	0.35%	0	0.00%	0	0.00%	1,043	27.86%	3,744
Lassen	3,056	70.41%	1,167	26.89%	77	1.77%	38	0.88%	2	0.05%	0	0.00%	0	0.00%	1,889	43.53%	4,340
Los Angeles	554,476	57.19%	373,738	38.55%	27,518	2.84%	8,713	0.90%	4,135	0.43%	458	0.05%	556 (Note: 446 for James Ford)	0.06%	180,738	18.64%	969,594
Madera	3,457	70.15%	1,243	25.22%	94	1.91%	99	2.01%	35	0.71%	0	0.00%	0	0.00%	2,214	44.93%	4,928
Marin	9,764	57.45%	6,480	38.13%	654	3.85%	68	0.40%	24	0.14%	3	0.02%	3 (Note: 3 for James Ford)	0.02%	3,284	19.32%	16,996
Mariposa	1,386	68.01%	560	27.48%	49	2.40%	17	0.83%	26	1.28%	0	0.00%	0	0.00%	826	40.53%	2,038
Mendocino	5,867	61.43%	3,365	35.23%	188	1.97%	65	0.68%	66	0.69%	0	0.00%	0	0.00%	2,502	26.20%	9,551
Merced	7,202	67.10%	2,920	27.20%	377	3.51%	158	1.47%	77	0.72%	0	0.00%	0	0.00%	4,282	39.89%	10,734
Modoc	1,643	68.86%	655	27.45%	42	1.76%	30	1.26%	16	0.67%	0	0.00%	0	0.00%	988	41.41%	2,386
Mono	374	64.37%	199	34.25%	6	1.03%	1	0.17%	1	0.17%	0	0.00%	0	0.00%	175	30.12%	581
Monterey	8,942	56.77%	6,200	39.37%	323	2.05%	116	0.74%	169	1.07%	0	0.00%	0	0.00%	2,742	17.41%	15,750
Napa	5,745	60.32%	3,521	36.97%	152	1.60%	77	0.81%	29	0.30%	0	0.00%	0	0.00%	2,224	23.35%	9,524
Nevada	3,544	63.33%	1,842	32.92%	136	2.43%	25	0.45%	49	0.88%	0	0.00%	0	0.00%	1,702	30.41%	5,596
Orange	23,835	48.37%	22,623	45.91%	1,577	3.20%	980	1.99%	257	0.52%	2	0.00%	2 (Note: 2 for James Ford)	0.00%	1,212	2.46%	49,276
Placer	6,200	71.40%	2,242	25.82%	155	1.79%	46	0.53%	40	0.46%	0	0.00%	0	0.00%	3,958	45.58%	8,683
Plumas	2,035	75.82%	582	21.68%	54	2.01%	12	0.45%	1	0.04%	0	0.00%	0	0.00%	1,453	54.14%	2,684
Riverside	12,755	45.37%	14,112	50.20%	693	2.47%	423	1.50%	129	0.46%	0	0.00%	0	0.00%	-1,357	-4.83%	28,112
Sacramento	36,370	69.32%	14,553	27.74%	978	1.86%	295	0.56%	269	0.51%	0	0.00%	0	0.00%	21,817	41.58%	52,465
San Benito	2,283	60.98%	1,269	33.89%	52	1.39%	32	0.85%	108	2.88%	0	0.00%	0	0.00%	1,014	27.08%	3,744
San Bernardino	24,889	50.23%	22,094	44.59%	1,502	3.03%	858	1.73%	205	0.41%	0	0.00%	0	0.00%	2,795	5.64%	49,548
San Diego	45,622	53.58%	35,305	41.46%	3,108	3.65%	759	0.89%	356	0.42%	0	0.00%	0	0.00%	10,317	12.12%	85,150
San Francisco	144,236	64.62%	70,152	31.43%	5,802	2.60%	1,913	0.86%	343	0.15%	382	0.17%	369 (Note: 369 for James Ford)	0.17%	74,084	33.19%	223,197
San Joaquin	21,929	63.33%	11,145	32.19%	1,137	3.29%	290	0.84%	115	0.33%	4	0.01%	6 (Note: 4 for James Ford)	0.02%	10,784	31.14%	34,626
San Luis Obispo	7,933	65.77%	3,449	28.59%	417	3.46%	161	1.33%	102	0.85%	0	0.00%	0	0.00%	4,484	37.17%	12,062
San Mateo	19,094	56.36%	13,442	39.68%	982	2.90%	121	0.36%	240	0.71%	0	0.00%	0	0.00%	5,652	16.68%	33,879
Santa Barbara	13,373	57.42%	8,864	38.06%	707	3.04%	170	0.73%	170	0.73%	0	0.00%	7	0.03%	4,509	19.36%	23,291
Santa Clara	28,272	49.14%	27,353	47.54%	1,377	2.39%	310	0.54%	205	0.36%	8	0.01%	6 (Note: 6 for James Ford)	0.01%	919	1.60%	57,531
Santa Cruz	8,246	55.01%	6,005	40.06%	306	2.04%	151	1.01%	282	1.88%	0	0.00%	0	0.00%	2,241	14.95%	14,990
Shasta	4,170	72.12%	1,382	23.90%	150	2.59%	61	1.05%	19	0.33%	0	0.00%	0	0.00%	2,788	48.22%	5,782
Sierra	796	69.40%	292	25.46%	45	3.92%	14	1.22%	0	0.00%	0	0.00%	0	0.00%	504	43.94%	1,147
Siskiyou	6,367	69.33%	2,458	26.76%	255	2.78%	89	0.97%	15	0.16%	0	0.00%	0	0.00%	3,909	42.56%	9,184
Solano	9,712	67.16%	4,382	30.30%	260	1.80%	63	0.44%	44	0.30%	0	0.00%	0	0.00%	5,330	36.86%	14,461
Sonoma	15,686	61.11%	9,161	35.69%	583	2.27%	188	0.73%	26	0.10%	13	0.05%	12 (Note: 12 for James Ford)	0.05%	6,525	25.42%	25,669
Stanislaus	12,336	58.63%	7,614	36.18%	595	2.83%	469	2.23%	28	0.13%	0	0.00%	0	0.00%	4,722	22.44%	21,042
Sutter	3,807	70.41%	1,392	25.74%	105	1.94%	47	0.87%	56	1.04%	0	0.00%	0	0.00%	2,415	44.66%	5,407
Tehama	3,534	60.40%	2,001	34.20%	149	2.55%	127	2.17%	40	0.68%	0	0.00%	0	0.00%	1,533	26.20%	5,851
Trinity	1,101	73.01%	318	21.09%	53	3.51%	29	1.92%	7	0.46%	0	0.00%	0	0.00%	783	51.92%	1,508
Tulare	15,631	62.53%	8,066	32.27%	629	2.52%	503	2.01%	170	0.68%	0	0.00%	0	0.00%	7,565	30.26%	24,999
Tuolumne	2,521	66.45%	1,145	30.18%	77	2.03%	21	0.55%	30	0.79%	0	0.00%	0	0.00%	1,376	36.27%	3,794
Ventura	10,903	58.82%	6,908	37.27%	433	2.34%	175	0.94%	116	0.63%	0	0.00%	0	0.00%	3,995	21.55%	18,535
Yolo	5,780	67.77%	2,515	29.49%	85	1.00%	101	1.18%	48	0.56%	0	0.00%	0	0.00%	3,265	38.28%	8,529
Yuba	3,138	69.84%	1,176	26.17%	90	2.00%	33	0.73%	56	1.25%	0	0.00%	0	0.00%	1,962	43.67%	4,493
Total	1,324,157	58.39%	847,902	37.39%	63,299	2.79%	20,637	0.91%	9,827	0.43%	1,023	0.05%	1,121	0.05%	476,255	21.00%	2,267,966

==== Counties that flipped from Republican to Democratic ====
- Alameda
- Alpine
- Butte
- Calaveras
- Colusa
- Contra Costa
- Del Norte
- Fresno
- Glenn
- Humboldt
- Imperial
- Inyo
- Kern
- Kings
- Lake
- Lassen
- Los Angeles
- Madera
- Marin
- Mariposa
- Mendocino
- Merced
- Modoc
- Mono
- Monterey
- Napa
- Nevada
- Orange
- Sacramento
- San Benito
- San Bernardino
- San Diego
- San Joaquin
- San Luis Obispo
- San Mateo
- Santa Barbara
- Santa Clara
- Santa Cruz
- Shasta
- Sierra
- Siskiyou
- Solano
- Sonoma
- Stanislaus
- Sutter
- Tehama
- Trinity
- Tulare
- Tuolumne
- Ventura
- Yolo
- Yuba
