= 1968 United States presidential election in California =

- November 5, 1968
- Turnout: 85.75% (of registered voters) ▼2.63 pp 62.34% (of eligible voters) ▼3.66 pp

Nominee	Richard Nixon	Hubert Humphrey	George Wallace
Party	Republican	Democratic	American Independent
Home state	New York (Note: Although he was born in California and he served as a U.S. senator from California, in 1968 Richard Nixon’s official state of residence was New York, because he moved there to practice law after his defeat in the 1962 California gubernatorial election. During his first term as president, Nixon re-established his residency in California. Consequently, most reliable reference books list Nixon's home state as New York in the 1968 election and his home state as California in the 1972 (and 1960) election.)	Minnesota	Alabama
Running mate	Spiro Agnew	Edmund Muskie	S. Marvin Griffin
Electoral vote	40	0	0
Popular vote	3,467,664	3,244,318	487,270
Percentage	47.82%	44.74%	6.72%
County results
Nixon
40–50%
50–60%
60–70%
Humphrey
40–50%
50–60%
President before election
Lyndon B. Johnson
Democratic
Elected President
Richard Nixon
Republican

The 1968 United States presidential election in California took place on November 5, 1968, as part of the 1968 United States presidential election. State voters chose 40 representatives, or electors, to the Electoral College, who voted for president and vice president.

California narrowly voted for the Republican nominee, former Vice President Richard Nixon of New York, over the Democratic nominee, Vice President Hubert Humphrey of Minnesota. The American Independent Party candidate, former Alabama governor George Wallace, performed rather well for a third-party candidate in the Pacific states region, surpassing six percent in every Pacific state except Hawaii, despite being thousands of miles away from his base in the Deep South, a reflection of his strong national third-party campaign. Despite this, Wallace's 6.72% in California was well below the 13.53% the Wallace ticket managed nationally.

Although Nixon was born and raised in California, he had moved to New York, following his failed 1962 gubernatorial bid, and thus identified New York as his home state in this election. After he won the election, Nixon moved his residency back to California. Nixon had previously defeated John F. Kennedy in California in 1960, and would later win the state again against George McGovern in 1972. Had Humphrey come out victorious in California, Nixon would have earned only 261 electoral votes, and thus, the election would have been sent to the United States House of Representatives.

As of the 2024 presidential election, this is the last time California had less electoral votes than New York, or that a Democrat had won Kings County.

Nixon also became the first-ever Republican to win the White House without carrying Alameda County, as well as the first to do so without carrying Santa Clara County since Ulysses Grant in 1868, and the first to do so without carrying Napa or San Mateo Counties since Abraham Lincoln in 1860.

Nixon's victory was the first of six consecutive Republican victories in the state, as California would not vote for a Democratic candidate again until Bill Clinton in 1992, after which the state has always gone Democratic. This is also the last election where California did not have the highest number of electoral votes.

== Campaign ==
During the 1968 California Democratic primary, Robert F. Kennedy won the primary "narrowly" but was assassinated after giving a victory speech.

== Polling ==
Poll Source	Date Published	Richard Nixon Republican	Hubert Humphrey Democratic	George Wallace American Independent	Other/ Undecided
Mervin Field	October 28, 1968	50%	34%	8%	8%
Don Muchmore	October 20, 1968	45%	35%	7%	13%
Don Muchmore	October 6, 1968	44%	33%	7%	16%
Mervin Field	September 29, 1968	51%	28%	11%	10%
Mervin Field	September 23, 1968	47%	30%	8%	15%
Don Muchmore	September 15, 1968	43%	34%	7%	16%

== Results ==
=== Primary election results ===
==== Democratic primaries ====
The primary election was held on June 4, 1968, with Robert F. Kennedy winning. The "no preference" option was initially meant to be Lyndon B. Johnson's position on the ballot.

1968 California Democratic presidential primary results
Candidate	# votes
Robert F. Kennedy	1,472,166
Eugene McCarthy	1,329,301
No preference	380,286
Total	3,181,753

==== Republican primaries ====
The primary election was held on June 4, 1968. Ronald Reagan was the only candidate in the primary and won the primary as he was the only candidate and got the most number of votes.

1968 California Republican presidential primary results
Candidate	# votes
Ronald Reagan	1,525,091
Total	1,525,091

=== General election results ===
1968 United States presidential election in California
Party	Candidate	Votes	Percentage	Electoral votes
Republican	Richard Nixon	3,467,664	47.82%	40
Democratic	Hubert Humphrey	3,244,318	44.74%	0
American Independent	George Wallace	487,270	6.72%	0
Peace and Freedom	Eldridge Cleaver	27,707	0.38%	0
No party	Eugene McCarthy (write-in)	20,721	0.29%	0
No party	Dick Gregory (write-in)	3,230	0.04%	0
No party	Henning A. Blomen (write-in)	341	0.00%	0
No party	Charlene Mitchell (write-in)	260	0.00%	0
No party	E. Harold Munn (write-in)	59	0.00%	0
No party	Write-ins	17	0.00%	0
Invalid or blank votes				—
Totals		7,251,587	100.00%	40
Voter turnout				—

==== Results by county ====
County	Richard Nixon Republican		Hubert Humphrey Democratic		George Wallace American Independent		Various candidates Other parties		Margin		Total votes cast
County	#	%	#	%	#	%	#	%	#	%	Total votes cast
Alameda	153,285	37.63%	219,545	53.90%	28,426	6.98%	6,093	1.50%	-66,260	-16.27%	407,349
Alpine	150	59.29%	83	32.81%	20	7.91%	0	0.00%	67	26.48%	253
Amador	2,269	42.10%	2,440	45.27%	660	12.24%	21	0.39%	-171	-3.17%	5,390
Butte	22,225	56.68%	12,887	32.87%	3,891	9.92%	208	0.53%	9,338	23.81%	39,211
Calaveras	3,042	52.16%	2,134	36.59%	643	11.03%	13	0.22%	908	15.57%	5,832
Colusa	2,361	51.58%	1,858	40.59%	344	7.52%	14	0.31%	503	10.99%	4,577
Contra Costa	97,486	44.53%	101,668	46.44%	18,330	8.37%	1,433	0.65%	-4,182	-1.91%	218,917
Del Norte	2,387	46.19%	2,236	43.27%	495	9.58%	50	0.97%	151	2.92%	5,168
El Dorado	7,468	49.00%	6,054	39.72%	1,676	11.00%	43	0.28%	1,414	9.28%	15,241
Fresno	59,901	43.60%	65,153	47.42%	11,292	8.22%	1,050	0.76%	-5,252	-3.82%	137,396
Glenn	3,848	53.91%	2,466	34.55%	808	11.32%	16	0.22%	1,382	19.36%	7,138
Humboldt	16,719	46.17%	16,476	45.50%	2,759	7.62%	260	0.72%	243	0.67%	36,214
Imperial	10,818	52.91%	7,481	36.59%	2,100	10.27%	47	0.23%	3,337	16.32%	20,446
Inyo	3,641	54.45%	2,314	34.60%	714	10.68%	18	0.27%	1,327	19.85%	6,687
Kern	53,990	46.61%	49,284	42.55%	12,309	10.63%	249	0.21%	4,706	4.06%	115,832
Kings	7,796	43.07%	8,643	47.75%	1,640	9.06%	22	0.12%	-847	-4.68%	18,101
Lake	4,464	49.00%	3,777	41.46%	838	9.20%	32	0.35%	687	7.54%	9,111
Lassen	2,553	41.06%	2,930	47.12%	712	11.45%	23	0.37%	-377	-6.06%	6,218
Los Angeles	1,266,480	47.65%	1,223,251	46.02%	151,050	5.68%	17,201	0.65%	43,229	1.63%	2,657,982
Madera	6,229	43.55%	6,932	48.47%	1,120	7.83%	22	0.15%	-703	-4.92%	14,303
Marin	41,422	50.05%	36,278	43.84%	3,801	4.59%	1,254	1.52%	5,144	6.21%	82,755
Mariposa	1,496	49.92%	1,187	39.61%	302	10.08%	12	0.40%	309	10.31%	2,997
Mendocino	8,305	46.39%	7,935	44.32%	1,554	8.68%	110	0.61%	370	2.07%	17,904
Merced	11,595	40.90%	14,453	50.98%	2,248	7.93%	53	0.19%	-2,858	-10.08%	28,349
Modoc	1,713	52.43%	1,264	38.69%	284	8.69%	6	0.18%	449	13.74%	3,267
Mono	1,130	64.28%	465	26.45%	156	8.87%	7	0.40%	665	37.83%	1,758
Monterey	33,670	50.16%	28,261	42.10%	4,800	7.15%	393	0.59%	5,409	8.06%	67,124
Napa	14,270	43.76%	14,762	45.27%	3,476	10.66%	104	0.32%	-492	-1.51%	32,612
Nevada	6,061	51.39%	4,607	39.06%	1,078	9.14%	48	0.41%	1,454	12.33%	11,794
Orange	314,905	63.14%	148,869	29.85%	33,034	6.62%	1,899	0.38%	166,036	33.29%	498,707
Placer	12,427	42.64%	14,050	48.21%	2,574	8.83%	93	0.32%	-1,623	-5.57%	29,144
Plumas	2,097	37.37%	2,961	52.77%	529	9.43%	24	0.43%	-864	-15.40%	5,611
Riverside	83,414	52.90%	61,146	38.78%	12,432	7.88%	678	0.43%	22,268	14.12%	157,670
Sacramento	97,177	41.66%	118,769	50.92%	16,269	6.98%	1,031	0.44%	-21,592	-9.26%	233,246
San Benito	2,961	47.54%	2,809	45.10%	447	7.18%	12	0.19%	152	2.44%	6,229
San Bernardino	111,974	50.07%	89,418	39.99%	21,187	9.47%	1,037	0.46%	22,556	10.08%	223,616
San Diego	261,540	56.26%	167,669	36.07%	33,340	7.17%	2,314	0.50%	93,871	20.19%	464,863
San Francisco	100,970	33.66%	177,509	59.18%	17,332	5.78%	4,136	1.38%	-76,539	-25.52%	299,947
San Joaquin	47,293	47.97%	42,073	42.68%	8,923	9.05%	300	0.30%	5,220	5.29%	98,589
San Luis Obispo	19,420	51.27%	15,828	41.78%	2,416	6.38%	217	0.57%	3,592	9.49%	37,881
San Mateo	98,654	43.72%	106,519	47.20%	14,720	6.52%	5,775	2.56%	-7,865	-3.48%	225,668
Santa Barbara	50,068	53.59%	37,565	40.21%	5,083	5.44%	704	0.75%	12,503	13.38%	93,420
Santa Clara	163,446	45.61%	173,511	48.42%	18,754	5.23%	2,656	0.74%	-10,065	-2.81%	358,367
Santa Cruz	25,365	50.79%	20,492	41.03%	3,465	6.94%	622	1.25%	4,873	9.76%	49,944
Shasta	11,821	40.44%	14,510	49.64%	2,815	9.63%	84	0.29%	-2,689	-9.20%	29,230
Sierra	548	45.93%	559	46.86%	85	7.12%	1	0.08%	-11	-0.93%	1,193
Siskiyou	6,334	46.13%	6,260	45.59%	1,088	7.92%	50	0.36%	74	0.54%	13,732
Solano	17,683	34.71%	27,271	53.52%	5,810	11.40%	188	0.37%	-9,588	-18.81%	50,952
Sonoma	38,088	48.79%	33,587	43.03%	5,875	7.53%	509	0.65%	4,501	5.76%	78,059
Stanislaus	29,573	45.45%	31,316	48.13%	3,973	6.11%	201	0.31%	-1,743	-2.68%	65,063
Sutter	8,665	59.57%	4,624	31.79%	1,228	8.44%	28	0.19%	4,041	27.78%	14,545
Tehama	5,198	47.26%	4,565	41.50%	1,216	11.06%	20	0.18%	633	5.76%	10,999
Trinity	1,426	43.12%	1,433	43.33%	432	13.06%	16	0.48%	-7	-0.21%	3,307
Tulare	29,314	52.17%	22,180	39.47%	4,580	8.15%	115	0.20%	7,134	12.70%	56,189
Tuolumne	4,330	47.48%	3,913	42.91%	865	9.49%	11	0.12%	417	4.57%	9,119
Ventura	59,705	51.35%	47,794	41.11%	8,234	7.08%	528	0.45%	11,911	10.24%	116,261
Yolo	11,123	38.41%	15,833	54.67%	1,742	6.02%	262	0.90%	-4,710	-16.26%	28,960
Yuba	5,371	48.17%	4,461	40.01%	1,296	11.62%	22	0.20%	910	8.16%	11,150
Total	3,467,664	47.82%	3,244,318	44.74%	487,270	6.72%	52,335	0.72%	223,346	3.08%	7,251,587

===== Counties that flipped from Democratic to Republican =====
- Butte
- Inyo
- Glenn
- Imperial
- Calaveras
- Riverside
- Modoc
- Santa Barbara
- Tulare
- Nevada
- Colusa
- Mariposa
- Ventura
- San Bernardino
- Santa Cruz
- San Luis Obispo
- Yuba
- Monterey
- El Dorado
- Lake
- Tehama
- Marin
- Sonoma
- San Joaquin
- Tuolumne
- Kern
- Del Norte
- San Benito
- Mendocino
- Siskiyou
- Humboldt
- Los Angeles

==== Results by city ====
Official outcome by city and unincorporated areas of counties, of which Nixon won 272 and Humphrey won 186.
City	County	Richard Nixon Republican		Hubert Humphrey Democratic		George Wallace American Independent		Eldridge Cleaver Peace and Freedom		Margin		Total Votes	1964 to 1968 Swing%
City	County	#	%	#	%	#	%	#	%	#	%	Total Votes	1964 to 1968 Swing%
Alameda	Alameda	9,732	46.27%	9,376	44.58%	1,889	8.98%	34	0.16%	356	1.69%	21,031	21.13%
Albany	Alameda	2,714	38.05%	3,829	53.68%	540	7.57%	50	0.70%	-1,115	-15.63%	7,133	16.61%
Berkeley	Alameda	12,072	25.43%	33,143	69.81%	895	1.89%	1,365	2.88%	-21,071	-44.38%	47,475	5.80%
Emeryville	Alameda	185	20.22%	583	63.72%	142	15.52%	5	0.55%	-398	-43.50%	915	2.18%
Fremont	Alameda	12,494	41.85%	14,530	48.67%	2,812	9.42%	18	0.06%	-2,036	-6.82%	29,854	19.12%
Hayward	Alameda	10,479	37.65%	14,600	52.45%	2,715	9.75%	42	0.15%	-4,121	-14.80%	27,836	15.00%
Livermore	Alameda	6,754	52.52%	5,103	39.68%	994	7.73%	9	0.07%	1,651	12.84%	12,860	23.31%
Newark	Alameda	2,179	33.85%	3,468	53.87%	786	12.21%	5	0.08%	-1,289	-20.02%	6,438	16.94%
Oakland	Alameda	47,916	33.88%	85,055	60.14%	7,753	5.48%	711	0.50%	-37,139	-26.26%	141,435	12.54%
Piedmont	Alameda	4,283	70.41%	1,591	26.15%	190	3.12%	19	0.31%	2,692	44.25%	6,083	16.73%
Pleasanton	Alameda	2,521	54.13%	1,779	38.20%	356	7.64%	1	0.02%	742	15.93%	4,657	29.93%
San Leandro	Alameda	11,693	40.12%	14,504	49.76%	2,926	10.04%	24	0.08%	-2,811	-9.64%	29,147	18.16%
Union City	Alameda	810	27.58%	1,853	63.09%	270	9.19%	4	0.14%	-1,043	-35.51%	2,937	26.17%
Unincorporated Area	Alameda	21,007	42.60%	23,408	47.47%	4,827	9.79%	68	0.14%	-2,401	-4.87%	49,310	18.46%
Unapportioned Absentees	Alameda	8,446	49.85%	6,723	39.68%	1,331	7.86%	442	2.61%	1,723	10.17%	16,942	37.86%
Unincorporated Area	Alpine	150	59.29%	83	32.81%	20	7.91%	0	0.00%	67	26.48%	253	11.13%
Amador City	Amador	27	43.55%	29	46.77%	6	9.68%	0	0.00%	-2	-3.23%	62	16.12%
Ione	Amador	320	44.63%	298	41.56%	98	13.67%	1	0.14%	22	3.07%	717	31.25%
Jackson	Amador	381	41.64%	444	48.52%	89	9.73%	1	0.11%	-63	-6.89%	915	37.06%
Plymouth	Amador	56	29.17%	116	60.42%	20	10.42%	0	0.00%	-60	-31.25%	192	10.33%
Sutter Creek	Amador	312	42.92%	336	46.22%	78	10.73%	1	0.14%	-24	-3.30%	727	26.70%
Unincorporated Area	Amador	1,010	42.37%	1,050	44.04%	322	13.51%	2	0.08%	-40	-1.68%	2,384	29.23%
Unapportioned Absentees	Amador	163	43.12%	167	44.18%	47	12.43%	1	0.26%	-4	-1.06%	378	46.62%
Biggs	Butte	163	46.84%	152	43.68%	32	9.20%	1	0.29%	11	3.16%	348	38.49%
Chico	Butte	3,729	60.52%	2,060	33.43%	348	5.65%	25	0.41%	1,669	27.09%	6,162	29.48%
Gridley	Butte	607	50.37%	474	39.34%	117	9.71%	7	0.58%	133	11.04%	1,205	25.80%
Oroville	Butte	1,377	50.09%	1,079	39.25%	284	10.33%	9	0.33%	298	10.84%	2,749	19.96%
Unincorporated Area	Butte	15,000	56.72%	8,458	31.98%	2,896	10.95%	92	0.35%	6,542	24.74%	26,446	26.28%
Unapportioned Absentees	Butte	1,349	60.38%	664	29.72%	214	9.58%	7	0.31%	685	30.66%	2,234	33.67%
Angels	Calaveras	377	47.84%	324	41.12%	87	11.04%	0	0.00%	53	6.73%	788	43.96%
Unincorporated Area	Calaveras	2,417	52.16%	1,695	36.58%	520	11.22%	2	0.04%	722	15.58%	4,634	29.12%
Unapportioned Absentees	Calaveras	248	62.16%	115	28.82%	36	9.02%	0	0.00%	133	33.33%	399	48.34%
Colusa	Colusa	672	51.45%	566	43.34%	67	5.13%	1	0.08%	106	8.12%	1,306	34.27%
Williams	Colusa	233	43.31%	231	42.94%	74	13.75%	0	0.00%	2	0.37%	538	25.23%
Unincorporated Area	Colusa	1,309	53.04%	971	39.34%	184	7.46%	4	0.16%	338	13.70%	2,468	31.84%
Unapportioned Absentees	Colusa	147	57.42%	90	35.16%	19	7.42%	0	0.00%	57	22.27%	256	39.48%
Antioch	Contra Costa	2,825	30.49%	5,652	61.00%	781	8.43%	7	0.08%	-2,827	-30.51%	9,265	25.01%
Brentwood	Contra Costa	308	38.31%	415	51.62%	79	9.83%	2	0.25%	-107	-13.31%	804	21.55%
Clayton	Contra Costa	299	56.20%	212	39.85%	20	3.76%	1	0.19%	87	16.35%	532	29.52%
Concord	Contra Costa	13,019	45.13%	13,397	46.44%	2,394	8.30%	38	0.13%	-378	-1.31%	28,848	31.04%
El Cerrito	Contra Costa	5,148	42.60%	5,986	49.54%	901	7.46%	49	0.41%	-838	-6.93%	12,084	9.83%
Hercules	Contra Costa	56	44.80%	53	42.40%	16	12.80%	0	0.00%	3	2.40%	125	9.34%
Lafayette	Contra Costa	6,139	65.73%	2,856	30.58%	333	3.57%	12	0.13%	3,283	35.15%	9,340	N/A
Martinez	Contra Costa	2,337	38.83%	3,129	51.99%	543	9.02%	10	0.17%	-792	-13.16%	6,019	29.61%
Pinole	Contra Costa	1,830	39.48%	2,014	43.45%	785	16.94%	6	0.13%	-184	-3.97%	4,635	17.00%
Pittsburg	Contra Costa	1,490	20.43%	5,240	71.86%	551	7.56%	11	0.15%	-3,750	-51.43%	7,292	20.45%
Pleasant Hill	Contra Costa	4,613	49.86%	3,885	42.00%	738	7.98%	15	0.16%	728	7.87%	9,251	27.36%
Richmond	Contra Costa	7,581	26.17%	18,512	63.90%	2,764	9.54%	111	0.38%	-10,931	-37.73%	28,968	4.49%
San Pablo	Contra Costa	1,685	26.55%	3,259	51.35%	1,388	21.87%	15	0.24%	-1,574	-24.80%	6,347	16.52%
Walnut Creek	Contra Costa	10,084	64.79%	4,910	31.55%	549	3.53%	21	0.13%	5,174	33.24%	15,564	44.57%
Unincorporated Area	Contra Costa	33,537	49.34%	28,634	42.13%	5,642	8.30%	160	0.24%	4,903	7.21%	67,973	21.62%
Unapportioned Absentees	Contra Costa	6,535	59.65%	3,514	32.07%	846	7.72%	61	0.56%	3,021	27.57%	10,956	47.79%
Crescent City	Del Norte	396	50.38%	333	42.37%	53	6.74%	4	0.51%	63	8.02%	786	26.38%
Unincorporated Area	Del Norte	1,752	44.53%	1,740	44.23%	399	10.14%	43	1.09%	12	0.31%	3,934	31.22%
Unapportioned Absentees	Del Norte	239	53.71%	163	36.63%	43	9.66%	0	0.00%	76	17.08%	445	28.88%
Placerville	El Dorado	1,065	51.23%	827	39.78%	186	8.95%	1	0.05%	238	11.45%	2,079	29.25%
South Lake Tahoe	El Dorado	1,546	49.97%	1,215	39.27%	328	10.60%	5	0.16%	331	10.70%	3,094	N/A
Unincorporated Area	El Dorado	4,210	47.01%	3,712	41.45%	1,026	11.46%	8	0.09%	498	5.56%	8,956	27.52%
Unapportioned Absentees	El Dorado	647	59.63%	300	27.65%	136	12.53%	2	0.18%	347	31.98%	1,085	43.85%
Clovis	Fresno (Note: The sum of Nixon’s votes across Fresno County municipalities exceeds the official county-wide tally by 900.) (Note: The sum of Humphrey’s votes across Fresno County municipalities exceeds the official county-wide tally by 1.)	1,605	41.17%	1,889	48.46%	390	10.01%	14	0.36%	-284	-7.29%	3,898	27.76%
Coalinga	Fresno	992	42.45%	1,131	48.40%	212	9.07%	2	0.09%	-139	-5.95%	2,337	25.43%
Firebaugh	Fresno	142	23.87%	407	68.40%	44	7.39%	2	0.34%	-265	-44.54%	595	7.29%
Fowler	Fresno	286	42.50%	348	51.71%	36	5.35%	3	0.45%	-62	-9.21%	673	35.15%
Fresno	Fresno	23,212	40.44%	29,581	51.54%	4,029	7.02%	570	0.99%	-6,369	-11.10%	57,392	25.57%
Huron	Fresno	44	17.67%	183	73.49%	20	8.03%	2	0.80%	-139	-55.82%	249	12.51%
Kerman	Fresno	256	36.83%	319	45.90%	120	17.27%	0	0.00%	-63	-9.06%	695	26.13%
Kingsburg	Fresno	878	58.81%	537	35.97%	76	5.09%	2	0.13%	341	22.84%	1,493	38.02%
Mendota	Fresno	104	22.03%	315	66.74%	51	10.81%	2	0.42%	-211	-44.70%	472	5.80%
Orange Cove	Fresno	192	31.53%	361	59.28%	54	8.87%	2	0.33%	-169	-27.75%	609	25.99%
Parlier	Fresno	103	30.65%	215	63.99%	18	5.36%	0	0.00%	-112	-33.33%	336	12.80%
Reedley	Fresno	1,526	57.17%	1,016	38.07%	124	4.65%	3	0.11%	510	19.11%	2,669	30.56%
Sanger	Fresno	1,009	36.06%	1,636	58.47%	145	5.18%	8	0.29%	-627	-22.41%	2,798	29.66%
San Joaquin	Fresno	92	36.36%	120	47.43%	40	15.81%	1	0.40%	-28	-11.07%	253	22.26%
Selma	Fresno	989	43.13%	1,119	48.80%	183	7.98%	2	0.09%	-130	-5.67%	2,293	25.40%
Unincorporated Area	Fresno	25,844	47.11%	23,609	43.04%	5,161	9.41%	244	0.44%	2,235	4.07%	54,858	28.95%
Unapportioned Absentees	Fresno	3,527	54.13%	2,368	36.34%	589	9.04%	32	0.49%	1,159	17.79%	6,516	46.12%
Orland	Glenn	648	56.54%	387	33.77%	110	9.60%	1	0.09%	261	22.77%	1,146	34.98%
Willows	Glenn	857	50.44%	712	41.91%	128	7.53%	2	0.12%	145	8.53%	1,699	28.11%
Unincorporated Area	Glenn	2,125	54.42%	1,245	31.88%	529	13.55%	6	0.15%	880	22.54%	3,905	24.99%
Unapportioned Absentees	Glenn	218	57.22%	122	32.02%	41	10.76%	0	0.00%	96	25.20%	381	26.93%
Arcata	Humboldt	955	43.69%	1,110	50.78%	102	4.67%	19	0.87%	-155	-7.09%	2,186	32.22%
Blue Lake	Humboldt	130	34.67%	209	55.73%	36	9.60%	0	0.00%	-79	-21.07%	375	28.16%
Eureka	Humboldt	4,467	45.86%	4,681	48.05%	559	5.74%	34	0.35%	-214	-2.20%	9,741	28.13%
Ferndale	Humboldt	339	59.27%	205	35.84%	27	4.72%	1	0.17%	134	23.43%	572	34.20%
Fortuna	Humboldt	836	54.86%	609	39.96%	75	4.92%	4	0.26%	227	14.90%	1,524	42.09%
Rio Dell	Humboldt	338	38.54%	476	54.28%	60	6.84%	3	0.34%	-138	-15.74%	877	N/A
Trinidad	Humboldt	63	42.00%	82	54.67%	5	3.33%	0	0.00%	-19	-12.67%	150	14.47%
Unincorporated Area	Humboldt	8,212	45.31%	8,191	45.19%	1,661	9.16%	61	0.34%	21	0.12%	18,125	34.82%
Unapportioned Absentees	Humboldt	1,379	54.38%	913	36.00%	234	9.23%	10	0.39%	466	18.38%	2,536	45.66%
Brawley	Imperial	1,949	51.56%	1,551	41.03%	274	7.25%	6	0.16%	398	10.53%	3,780	18.86%
Calexico	Imperial	665	39.35%	947	56.04%	75	4.44%	3	0.18%	-282	-16.69%	1,690	18.01%
Calipatria	Imperial	193	43.86%	215	48.86%	32	7.27%	0	0.00%	-22	-5.00%	440	13.83%
El Centro	Imperial	3,258	56.45%	1,987	34.43%	523	9.06%	3	0.05%	1,271	22.02%	5,771	19.80%
Holtville	Imperial	505	52.44%	332	34.48%	126	13.08%	0	0.00%	173	17.96%	963	27.72%
Imperial	Imperial	501	50.50%	326	32.86%	163	16.43%	2	0.20%	175	17.64%	992	31.03%
Westmorland	Imperial	132	41.38%	130	40.75%	56	17.55%	1	0.31%	2	0.63%	319	29.05%
Unincorporated Area	Imperial	2,879	54.10%	1,727	32.45%	712	13.38%	4	0.08%	1,152	21.65%	5,322	17.20%
Unapportioned Absentees	Imperial	736	64.45%	266	23.29%	139	12.17%	1	0.09%	470	41.16%	1,142	24.85%
Bishop	Inyo	792	57.56%	438	31.83%	146	10.61%	0	0.00%	354	25.73%	1,376	23.71%
Unincorporated Area	Inyo	2,457	52.52%	1,699	36.32%	518	11.07%	4	0.09%	758	16.20%	4,678	25.94%
Unapportioned Absentees	Inyo	392	63.12%	177	28.50%	50	8.05%	2	0.32%	215	34.62%	621	41.39%
Arvin	Kern	418	37.73%	536	48.38%	152	13.72%	2	0.18%	-118	-10.65%	1,108	27.39%
Bakersfield	Kern	13,849	50.14%	11,517	41.70%	2,234	8.09%	20	0.07%	2,332	8.44%	27,620	21.69%
California City	Kern	179	50.85%	126	35.80%	46	13.07%	1	0.28%	53	15.06%	352	N/A
Delano	Kern	1,812	43.99%	2,026	49.19%	280	6.80%	1	0.02%	-214	-5.20%	4,119	31.52%
Maricopa	Kern	96	34.78%	130	47.10%	50	18.12%	0	0.00%	-34	-12.32%	276	23.78%
McFarland	Kern	416	47.60%	358	40.96%	100	11.44%	0	0.00%	58	6.64%	874	38.31%
Ridgecrest	Kern	1,288	48.11%	914	34.14%	472	17.63%	3	0.11%	374	13.97%	2,677	23.41%
Shafter	Kern	1,075	59.43%	562	31.07%	172	9.51%	0	0.00%	513	28.36%	1,809	29.12%
Taft	Kern	1,062	53.56%	789	39.79%	130	6.56%	2	0.10%	273	13.77%	1,983	28.23%
Tehachapi	Kern	663	47.60%	558	40.06%	166	11.92%	6	0.43%	105	7.54%	1,393	34.84%
Wasco	Kern	1,029	45.17%	1,018	44.69%	230	10.10%	1	0.04%	11	0.48%	2,278	33.33%
Unincorporated Area	Kern	28,855	46.42%	25,502	41.03%	7,724	12.43%	80	0.13%	3,353	5.39%	62,161	23.55%
Unapportioned Absentees	Kern	3,248	35.86%	5,248	57.94%	553	6.11%	8	0.09%	-2,000	-22.08%	9,057	-9.74%
Corcoran	Kings	681	43.51%	738	47.16%	144	9.20%	2	0.13%	-57	-3.64%	1,565	28.84%
Hanford	Kings	2,071	44.89%	2,242	48.59%	301	6.52%	0	0.00%	-171	-3.71%	4,614	34.64%
Lemoore	Kings	542	42.34%	630	49.22%	108	8.44%	0	0.00%	-88	-6.88%	1,280	32.63%
Unincorporated Area	Kings	3,923	40.76%	4,701	48.84%	997	10.36%	4	0.04%	-778	-8.08%	9,625	33.32%
Unapportioned Absentees	Kings	579	57.73%	332	33.10%	90	8.97%	2	0.20%	247	24.63%	1,003	48.31%
Lakeport	Lake	646	54.01%	447	37.37%	101	8.44%	2	0.17%	199	16.64%	1,196	23.41%
Unincorporated Area	Lake	3,379	47.15%	3,113	43.44%	663	9.25%	11	0.15%	266	3.71%	7,166	16.70%
Unapportioned Absentees	Lake	439	60.05%	217	29.69%	74	10.12%	1	0.14%	222	30.37%	731	53.60%
Susanville	Lassen	1,027	39.58%	1,336	51.48%	227	8.75%	5	0.19%	-309	-11.91%	2,595	25.00%
Unincorporated Area	Lassen	1,322	41.39%	1,442	45.15%	429	13.43%	1	0.03%	-120	-3.76%	3,194	23.49%
Unapportioned Absentees	Lassen	204	49.39%	152	36.80%	56	13.56%	1	0.24%	52	12.59%	413	36.54%
Alhambra	Los Angeles (Note: The sum of Humphrey’s votes across Los Angeles County municipalities exceeds the official county-wide tally by 2700.) (Note: The sum of Wallace’s votes across Los Angeles County municipalities is 30 fewer than the official county-wide tally.)	16,970	57.38%	11,074	37.45%	1,450	4.90%	80	0.27%	5,896	19.94%	29,574	15.30%
Arcadia	Los Angeles	17,343	74.62%	4,961	21.35%	912	3.92%	25	0.11%	12,382	53.28%	23,241	15.31%
Artesia	Los Angeles	1,923	52.27%	1,453	39.49%	293	7.96%	10	0.27%	470	12.78%	3,679	26.00%
Avalon	Los Angeles	372	50.96%	299	40.96%	57	7.81%	2	0.27%	73	10.00%	730	13.21%
Azusa	Los Angeles	3,144	45.52%	3,148	45.58%	595	8.61%	20	0.29%	-4	-0.06%	6,907	21.63%
Baldwin Park	Los Angeles	4,705	39.78%	5,809	49.12%	1,270	10.74%	43	0.36%	-1,104	-9.33%	11,827	21.14%
Bell	Los Angeles	3,219	44.21%	3,120	42.85%	913	12.54%	29	0.40%	99	1.36%	7,281	21.17%
Bellflower	Los Angeles	9,356	50.02%	7,404	39.58%	1,886	10.08%	59	0.32%	1,952	10.44%	18,705	23.10%
Bell Gardens	Los Angeles	1,950	32.51%	2,788	46.48%	1,241	20.69%	19	0.32%	-838	-13.97%	5,998	30.07%
Beverly Hills	Los Angeles	6,693	36.98%	11,138	61.54%	206	1.14%	61	0.34%	-4,445	-24.56%	18,098	5.24%
Bradbury	Los Angeles	345	74.84%	88	19.09%	28	6.07%	0	0.00%	257	55.75%	461	1.77%
Burbank	Los Angeles	23,002	57.80%	14,135	35.52%	2,573	6.47%	84	0.21%	8,867	22.28%	39,794	20.28%
Carson	Los Angeles	6,388	35.24%	9,747	53.76%	1,916	10.57%	78	0.43%	-3,359	-18.53%	18,129	N/A
Cerritos	Los Angeles	1,439	62.35%	690	29.90%	175	7.58%	4	0.17%	749	32.45%	2,308	18.88%
Claremont	Los Angeles	5,775	61.84%	3,280	35.13%	238	2.55%	45	0.48%	2,495	26.72%	9,338	13.79%
Commerce	Los Angeles	565	21.05%	1,918	71.46%	185	6.89%	16	0.60%	-1,353	-50.41%	2,684	13.57%
Compton	Los Angeles	3,220	14.72%	17,822	81.45%	727	3.32%	113	0.52%	-14,602	-66.73%	21,882	-7.38%
Covina	Los Angeles	7,457	62.30%	3,764	31.45%	734	6.13%	15	0.13%	3,693	30.85%	11,970	18.20%
Cudahy	Los Angeles	1,230	37.04%	1,527	45.98%	550	16.56%	14	0.42%	-297	-8.94%	3,321	18.05%
Culver City	Los Angeles	6,330	47.79%	6,154	46.46%	729	5.50%	32	0.24%	176	1.33%	13,245	16.04%
Downey	Los Angeles	20,723	58.11%	12,017	33.70%	2,848	7.99%	72	0.20%	8,706	24.41%	35,660	20.99%
Duarte	Los Angeles	2,575	54.65%	1,702	36.12%	420	8.91%	15	0.32%	873	18.53%	4,712	26.67%
El Monte	Los Angeles	8,618	43.65%	9,169	46.44%	1,905	9.65%	51	0.26%	-551	-2.79%	19,743	18.63%
El Segundo	Los Angeles	3,589	59.30%	1,887	31.18%	568	9.39%	8	0.13%	1,702	28.12%	6,052	20.12%
Gardena	Los Angeles	6,907	48.94%	5,995	42.48%	1,179	8.35%	32	0.23%	912	6.46%	14,113	17.73%
Glendale	Los Angeles	40,483	68.68%	15,213	25.81%	3,140	5.33%	105	0.18%	25,270	42.87%	58,941	16.16%
Glendora	Los Angeles	7,945	65.91%	3,329	27.62%	771	6.40%	10	0.08%	4,616	38.29%	12,055	19.56%
Hawaiian Gardens	Los Angeles	452	28.23%	905	56.53%	238	14.87%	6	0.37%	-453	-28.29%	1,601	11.19%
Hawthorne	Los Angeles	8,750	49.51%	6,981	39.50%	1,895	10.72%	46	0.26%	1,769	10.01%	17,672	16.29%
Hermosa Beach	Los Angeles	4,131	58.13%	2,490	35.04%	442	6.22%	43	0.61%	1,641	23.09%	7,106	18.47%
Hidden Hills	Los Angeles	476	76.28%	135	21.63%	13	2.08%	0	0.00%	341	54.65%	624	21.55%
Huntington Park	Los Angeles	5,140	47.25%	4,522	41.57%	1,167	10.73%	50	0.46%	618	5.68%	10,879	16.27%
Industry	Los Angeles	29	53.70%	23	42.59%	1	1.85%	1	1.85%	6	11.11%	54	22.35%
Inglewood	Los Angeles	19,680	53.77%	14,061	38.42%	2,797	7.64%	64	0.17%	5,619	15.35%	36,602	6.86%
Irwindale	Los Angeles	47	19.92%	166	70.34%	22	9.32%	1	0.42%	-119	-50.42%	236	15.85%
Lakewood	Los Angeles	16,114	49.05%	13,957	42.49%	2,674	8.14%	104	0.32%	2,157	6.57%	32,849	22.72%
La Mirada	Los Angeles	6,047	58.90%	3,492	34.01%	704	6.86%	24	0.23%	2,555	24.89%	10,267	23.21%
La Puente	Los Angeles	2,768	34.99%	4,416	55.83%	705	8.91%	21	0.27%	-1,648	-20.83%	7,910	18.03%
La Verne	Los Angeles	2,692	58.09%	1,654	35.69%	276	5.96%	12	0.26%	1,038	22.40%	4,634	27.77%
Lawndale	Los Angeles	2,549	40.15%	2,864	45.12%	915	14.41%	20	0.32%	-315	-4.96%	6,348	14.96%
Lomita	Los Angeles	3,112	46.25%	2,868	42.62%	721	10.71%	28	0.42%	244	3.63%	6,729	18.47%
Long Beach	Los Angeles	78,388	53.54%	58,203	39.75%	9,257	6.32%	570	0.39%	20,185	13.79%	146,418	19.18%
Los Angeles	Los Angeles	405,570	39.90%	565,804	55.67%	40,525	3.99%	4,450	0.44%	-160,234	-15.77%	1,016,349	13.24%
Lynwood	Los Angeles	7,597	48.49%	6,212	39.65%	1,815	11.59%	42	0.27%	1,385	8.84%	15,666	17.75%
Manhattan Beach	Los Angeles	9,829	61.90%	5,159	32.49%	839	5.28%	51	0.32%	4,670	29.41%	15,878	14.15%
Maywood	Los Angeles	1,965	39.47%	2,325	46.71%	665	13.36%	23	0.46%	-360	-7.23%	4,978	18.90%
Monrovia	Los Angeles	7,125	60.46%	3,963	33.63%	678	5.75%	19	0.16%	3,162	26.83%	11,785	20.87%
Montebello	Los Angeles	6,309	40.36%	8,547	54.68%	717	4.59%	58	0.37%	-2,238	-14.32%	15,631	16.60%
Monterey Park	Los Angeles	8,776	44.75%	9,899	50.48%	891	4.54%	44	0.22%	-1,123	-5.73%	19,610	13.08%
Norwalk	Los Angeles	10,085	39.73%	12,232	48.18%	3,006	11.84%	64	0.25%	-2,147	-8.46%	25,387	22.02%
Palmdale	Los Angeles	1,616	54.23%	982	32.95%	378	12.68%	4	0.13%	634	21.28%	2,980	21.98%
Palos Verdes Estates	Los Angeles	4,800	77.41%	1,225	19.75%	168	2.71%	8	0.13%	3,575	57.65%	6,201	12.71%
Paramount	Los Angeles	3,757	40.89%	4,182	45.52%	1,212	13.19%	36	0.39%	-425	-4.63%	9,187	23.37%
Pasadena	Los Angeles	28,646	59.50%	17,652	36.67%	1,670	3.47%	173	0.36%	10,994	22.84%	48,141	17.72%
Pico Rivera	Los Angeles	5,888	34.87%	9,933	58.82%	1,014	6.00%	51	0.30%	-4,045	-23.95%	16,886	13.15%
Pomona	Los Angeles	14,856	51.50%	11,903	41.26%	2,017	6.99%	70	0.24%	2,953	10.24%	28,846	16.07%
Redondo Beach	Los Angeles	9,864	51.26%	7,417	38.54%	1,892	9.83%	70	0.36%	2,447	12.72%	19,243	17.78%
Rolling Hills	Los Angeles	767	80.40%	142	14.88%	45	4.72%	0	0.00%	625	65.51%	954	8.30%
Rolling Hills Estates	Los Angeles	2,245	75.79%	599	20.22%	112	3.78%	6	0.20%	1,646	55.57%	2,962	13.18%
Rosemead	Los Angeles	5,700	43.45%	6,337	48.30%	1,058	8.06%	24	0.18%	-637	-4.86%	13,119	6.39%
San Dimas	Los Angeles	2,486	55.50%	1,623	36.24%	362	8.08%	8	0.18%	863	19.27%	4,479	19.43%
San Fernando	Los Angeles	2,440	45.71%	2,548	47.73%	342	6.41%	8	0.15%	-108	-2.02%	5,338	19.03%
San Gabriel	Los Angeles	7,705	58.49%	4,789	36.35%	658	5.00%	21	0.16%	2,916	22.14%	13,173	10.10%
San Marino	Los Angeles	6,590	86.76%	791	10.41%	209	2.75%	6	0.08%	5,799	76.34%	7,596	8.27%
Santa Fe Springs	Los Angeles	1,456	34.64%	2,430	57.82%	300	7.14%	17	0.40%	-974	-23.17%	4,203	18.58%
Santa Monica	Los Angeles	19,848	53.90%	15,037	40.84%	1,699	4.61%	237	0.64%	4,811	13.07%	36,821	16.17%
Sierra Madre	Los Angeles	3,766	68.26%	1,492	27.04%	237	4.30%	22	0.40%	2,274	41.22%	5,517	17.53%
Signal Hill	Los Angeles	941	48.43%	790	40.66%	201	10.34%	11	0.57%	151	7.77%	1,943	13.28%
South El Monte	Los Angeles	1,018	31.42%	1,927	59.48%	283	8.73%	12	0.37%	-909	-28.06%	3,240	16.06%
South Gate	Los Angeles	10,943	48.00%	9,274	40.68%	2,498	10.96%	83	0.36%	1,669	7.32%	22,798	20.57%
South Pasadena	Los Angeles	7,807	69.94%	2,872	25.73%	454	4.07%	30	0.27%	4,935	44.21%	11,163	11.41%
Temple City	Los Angeles	8,812	61.47%	4,623	32.25%	867	6.05%	34	0.24%	4,189	29.22%	14,336	17.78%
Torrance	Los Angeles	30,880	57.79%	18,367	34.37%	4,081	7.64%	106	0.20%	12,513	23.42%	53,434	20.67%
Walnut	Los Angeles	1,253	65.19%	547	28.46%	121	6.30%	1	0.05%	706	36.73%	1,922	30.84%
West Covina	Los Angeles	14,699	58.66%	8,709	34.76%	1,624	6.48%	24	0.10%	5,990	23.91%	25,056	16.13%
Whittier	Los Angeles	22,037	69.20%	8,475	26.61%	1,270	3.99%	62	0.19%	13,562	42.59%	31,844	22.67%
Unincorporated Area	Los Angeles	167,443	47.80%	159,586	45.55%	22,275	6.36%	1,018	0.29%	7,857	2.24%	350,322	17.48%
Unapportioned Absentees	Los Angeles	58,320	60.97%	31,190	32.61%	5,501	5.75%	639	0.67%	27,130	28.36%	95,650	28.44%
Chowchilla	Madera	601	39.72%	774	51.16%	137	9.05%	1	0.07%	-173	-11.43%	1,513	24.54%
Madera	Madera	2,041	38.36%	2,991	56.21%	286	5.37%	3	0.06%	-950	-17.85%	5,321	27.18%
Unincorporated Area	Madera	3,129	46.83%	2,903	43.45%	646	9.67%	4	0.06%	226	3.38%	6,682	32.66%
Unapportioned Absentees	Madera	458	58.94%	264	33.98%	51	6.56%	4	0.51%	194	24.97%	777	53.37%
Belvedere	Marin	839	65.55%	411	32.11%	26	2.03%	4	0.31%	428	33.44%	1,280	25.32%
Corte Madera	Marin	1,894	51.38%	1,563	42.40%	208	5.64%	21	0.57%	331	8.98%	3,686	32.11%
Fairfax	Marin	1,183	42.58%	1,404	50.54%	151	5.44%	40	1.44%	-221	-7.96%	2,778	26.03%
Larkspur	Marin	2,014	53.38%	1,587	42.06%	153	4.06%	19	0.50%	427	11.32%	3,773	30.93%
Mill Valley	Marin	2,545	44.86%	2,873	50.64%	195	3.44%	60	1.06%	-328	-5.78%	5,673	18.67%
Novato	Marin	4,056	49.65%	3,572	43.73%	515	6.30%	26	0.32%	484	5.92%	8,169	34.37%
Ross	Marin	755	62.19%	422	34.76%	31	2.55%	6	0.49%	333	27.43%	1,214	21.40%
San Anselmo	Marin	2,617	46.27%	2,757	48.74%	230	4.07%	52	0.92%	-140	-2.48%	5,656	26.87%
San Rafael	Marin	7,683	52.68%	6,238	42.78%	619	4.24%	43	0.29%	1,445	9.91%	14,583	33.42%
Sausalito	Marin	1,322	42.39%	1,638	52.52%	111	3.56%	48	1.54%	-316	-10.13%	3,119	21.27%
Tiburon	Marin	1,287	53.49%	1,049	43.60%	56	2.33%	14	0.58%	238	9.89%	2,406	25.54%
Unincorporated Area	Marin	15,227	51.22%	12,764	42.93%	1,506	5.07%	233	0.78%	2,463	8.28%	29,730	31.13%
Unincorporated Area	Mariposa	1,496	50.08%	1,187	39.74%	302	10.11%	2	0.07%	309	10.34%	2,987	25.16%
Fort Bragg	Mendocino	607	37.56%	881	54.52%	119	7.36%	9	0.56%	-274	-16.96%	1,616	33.61%
Point Arena	Mendocino	94	70.15%	22	16.42%	18	13.43%	0	0.00%	72	53.73%	134	37.06%
Ukiah	Mendocino	1,723	45.85%	1,727	45.96%	306	8.14%	2	0.05%	-4	-0.11%	3,758	30.98%
Willits	Mendocino	474	46.70%	458	45.12%	82	8.08%	1	0.10%	16	1.58%	1,015	32.82%
Unincorporated Area	Mendocino	4,849	47.08%	4,475	43.45%	940	9.13%	35	0.34%	374	3.63%	10,299	31.76%
Unapportioned Absentees	Mendocino	558	54.49%	372	36.33%	89	8.69%	5	0.49%	186	18.16%	1,024	42.73%
Atwater	Merced	779	40.49%	957	49.74%	184	9.56%	4	0.21%	-178	-9.25%	1,924	27.77%
Dos Palos	Merced	375	43.86%	376	43.98%	104	12.16%	0	0.00%	-1	-0.12%	855	29.09%
Gustine	Merced	315	29.58%	719	67.51%	31	2.91%	0	0.00%	-404	-37.93%	1,065	27.78%
Livingston	Merced	224	39.72%	308	54.61%	30	5.32%	2	0.35%	-84	-14.89%	564	22.61%
Los Banos	Merced	965	36.53%	1,508	57.08%	163	6.17%	6	0.23%	-543	-20.55%	2,642	33.22%
Merced	Merced	2,741	40.60%	3,645	53.99%	356	5.27%	9	0.13%	-904	-13.39%	6,751	21.05%
Unincorporated Area	Merced	5,361	41.49%	6,341	49.07%	1,202	9.30%	18	0.14%	-980	-7.58%	12,922	26.75%
Unapportioned Absentees	Merced	835	51.80%	599	37.16%	178	11.04%	0	0.00%	236	14.64%	1,612	47.30%
Alturas	Modoc	447	42.29%	548	51.84%	61	5.77%	1	0.09%	-101	-9.56%	1,057	36.96%
Unincorporated Area	Modoc	1,118	57.84%	620	32.07%	193	9.98%	2	0.10%	498	25.76%	1,933	25.36%
Unapportioned Absentees	Modoc	148	54.01%	96	35.04%	30	10.95%	0	0.00%	52	18.98%	274	51.85%
Unincorporated Area	Mono	1,130	64.53%	465	26.56%	156	8.91%	0	0.00%	665	37.98%	1,751	25.84%
Carmel-by-the-Sea	Monterey	1,474	60.86%	865	35.71%	76	3.14%	7	0.29%	609	25.14%	2,422	24.90%
Del Rey Oaks	Monterey	395	55.17%	276	38.55%	42	5.87%	3	0.42%	119	16.62%	716	35.33%
Gonzales	Monterey	236	39.86%	329	55.57%	27	4.56%	0	0.00%	-93	-15.71%	592	23.69%
Greenfield	Monterey	271	51.52%	218	41.44%	37	7.03%	0	0.00%	53	10.08%	526	23.40%
King City	Monterey	695	61.94%	360	32.09%	67	5.97%	0	0.00%	335	29.86%	1,122	39.94%
Monterey	Monterey	3,305	46.81%	3,241	45.90%	491	6.95%	24	0.34%	64	0.91%	7,061	35.66%
Pacific Grove	Monterey	2,939	54.38%	2,122	39.26%	327	6.05%	17	0.31%	817	15.12%	5,405	30.56%
Salinas	Monterey	8,394	46.52%	8,313	46.08%	1,307	7.24%	28	0.16%	81	0.45%	18,042	28.24%
Sand City	Monterey	23	29.87%	26	33.77%	21	27.27%	7	9.09%	-3	-3.90%	77	41.34%
Seaside	Monterey	1,289	28.87%	2,709	60.67%	463	10.37%	4	0.09%	-1,420	-31.80%	4,465	21.50%
Soledad	Monterey	255	33.55%	458	60.26%	46	6.05%	1	0.13%	-203	-26.71%	760	19.66%
Unincorporated Area	Monterey	11,464	54.70%	7,848	37.44%	1,599	7.63%	48	0.23%	3,616	17.25%	20,959	31.97%
Unapportioned Absentees	Monterey	2,930	61.91%	1,496	31.61%	297	6.28%	10	0.21%	1,434	30.30%	4,733	51.18%
Calistoga	Napa	408	47.28%	393	45.54%	62	7.18%	0	0.00%	15	1.74%	863	27.76%
Napa	Napa	5,463	38.87%	7,126	50.70%	1,458	10.37%	7	0.05%	-1,663	-11.83%	14,054	20.99%
St. Helena	Napa	854	55.13%	595	38.41%	99	6.39%	1	0.06%	259	16.72%	1,549	24.62%
Yountville	Napa	307	29.83%	639	62.10%	80	7.77%	3	0.29%	-332	-32.26%	1,029	N/A
Unincorporated Area	Napa	7,238	48.15%	6,009	39.97%	1,777	11.82%	9	0.06%	1,229	8.18%	15,033	29.64%
Grass Valley	Nevada	989	47.23%	939	44.84%	163	7.78%	3	0.14%	50	2.39%	2,094	23.44%
Nevada City	Nevada	510	50.50%	431	42.67%	68	6.73%	1	0.10%	79	7.82%	1,010	27.15%
Unincorporated Area	Nevada	4,005	51.59%	2,987	38.48%	758	9.76%	13	0.17%	1,018	13.11%	7,763	24.07%
Unapportioned Absentees	Nevada	557	62.10%	250	27.87%	89	9.92%	1	0.11%	307	34.23%	897	37.54%
Anaheim	Orange (Note: The sum of Nixon’s votes across Orange County municipalities is 3 fewer than the official county-wide tally.)	34,046	60.73%	17,713	31.60%	4,257	7.59%	45	0.08%	16,333	29.13%	56,061	17.73%
Brea	Orange	4,501	66.87%	1,828	27.16%	394	5.85%	8	0.12%	2,673	39.71%	6,731	19.49%
Buena Park	Orange	10,714	52.81%	7,640	37.66%	1,924	9.48%	9	0.04%	3,074	15.15%	20,287	18.74%
Costa Mesa	Orange	16,126	65.25%	7,120	28.81%	1,368	5.54%	100	0.40%	9,006	36.44%	24,714	20.79%
Cypress	Orange	4,636	56.29%	2,909	35.32%	686	8.33%	5	0.06%	1,727	20.97%	8,236	30.72%
Fountain Valley	Orange	5,662	63.11%	2,676	29.83%	623	6.94%	10	0.11%	2,986	33.29%	8,971	31.91%
Fullerton	Orange	21,635	65.92%	9,523	29.01%	1,631	4.97%	33	0.10%	12,112	36.90%	32,822	19.06%
Garden Grove	Orange	22,952	56.83%	13,852	34.30%	3,549	8.79%	32	0.08%	9,100	22.53%	40,385	24.54%
Huntington Beach	Orange	22,107	61.30%	11,199	31.06%	2,734	7.58%	21	0.06%	10,908	30.25%	36,061	28.60%
Laguna Beach	Orange	4,682	68.19%	1,919	27.95%	230	3.35%	35	0.51%	2,763	40.24%	6,866	4.35%
La Habra	Orange	9,518	63.50%	4,669	31.15%	798	5.32%	5	0.03%	4,849	32.35%	14,990	21.26%
La Palma	Orange	1,624	63.19%	730	28.40%	214	8.33%	2	0.08%	894	34.79%	2,570	-6.45%
Los Alamitos	Orange	1,756	55.91%	1,192	37.95%	187	5.95%	6	0.19%	564	17.96%	3,141	22.73%
Newport Beach	Orange	16,410	77.09%	4,249	19.96%	590	2.77%	37	0.17%	12,161	57.13%	21,286	10.27%
Orange	Orange	18,218	67.74%	6,998	26.02%	1,649	6.13%	29	0.11%	11,220	41.72%	26,894	17.62%
Placentia	Orange	4,394	63.26%	2,198	31.64%	348	5.01%	6	0.09%	2,196	31.62%	6,946	27.27%
San Clemente	Orange	4,591	70.93%	1,530	23.64%	342	5.28%	10	0.15%	3,061	47.29%	6,473	16.59%
San Juan Capistrano	Orange	757	63.40%	329	27.55%	108	9.05%	0	0.00%	428	35.85%	1,194	18.96%
Santa Ana	Orange	25,864	56.83%	15,962	35.07%	3,630	7.98%	54	0.12%	9,902	21.76%	45,510	16.82%
Seal Beach	Orange	8,298	65.28%	4,069	32.01%	332	2.61%	12	0.09%	4,229	33.27%	12,711	24.41%
Stanton	Orange	2,966	52.64%	2,139	37.97%	527	9.35%	2	0.04%	827	14.68%	5,634	25.18%
Tustin	Orange	4,106	71.68%	1,332	23.25%	285	4.98%	5	0.09%	2,774	48.43%	5,728	19.68%
Villa Park	Orange	638	81.79%	108	13.85%	32	4.10%	2	0.26%	530	67.95%	780	15.67%
Westminster	Orange	9,894	53.88%	6,617	36.03%	1,843	10.04%	10	0.05%	3,277	17.84%	18,364	31.27%
Yorba Linda	Orange	3,125	75.85%	787	19.10%	206	5.00%	2	0.05%	2,338	56.75%	4,120	N/A
Unincorporated Area	Orange	40,480	68.88%	15,098	25.69%	3,142	5.35%	50	0.09%	25,382	43.19%	58,770	20.45%
Unapportioned Absentees	Orange	15,202	71.82%	4,483	21.18%	1,405	6.64%	77	0.36%	10,719	50.64%	21,167	31.49%
Auburn	Placer	1,399	49.43%	1,231	43.50%	196	6.93%	4	0.14%	168	5.94%	2,830	22.39%
Colfax	Placer	132	39.40%	178	53.13%	23	6.87%	2	0.60%	-46	-13.73%	335	29.73%
Lincoln	Placer	396	38.30%	564	54.55%	73	7.06%	1	0.10%	-168	-16.25%	1,034	35.58%
Rocklin	Placer	349	36.05%	522	53.93%	94	9.71%	3	0.31%	-173	-17.87%	968	31.47%
Roseville	Placer	2,173	32.37%	4,025	59.96%	507	7.55%	8	0.12%	-1,852	-27.59%	6,713	21.04%
Unincorporated Area	Placer	6,955	45.88%	6,733	44.41%	1,451	9.57%	21	0.14%	222	1.46%	15,160	26.76%
Unapportioned Absentees	Placer	1,023	49.81%	797	38.80%	230	11.20%	4	0.19%	226	11.00%	2,054	36.69%
Portola	Plumas	135	20.06%	475	70.58%	62	9.21%	1	0.15%	-340	-50.52%	673	18.82%
Unincorporated Area	Plumas	1,719	39.63%	2,198	50.67%	413	9.52%	8	0.18%	-479	-11.04%	4,338	23.86%
Unapportioned Absentees	Plumas	243	41.54%	288	49.23%	54	9.23%	0	0.00%	-45	-7.69%	585	45.94%
Banning	Riverside	2,229	50.11%	1,843	41.43%	373	8.39%	3	0.07%	386	8.68%	4,448	23.83%
Beaumont	Riverside	1,024	49.98%	812	39.63%	208	10.15%	5	0.24%	212	10.35%	2,049	24.01%
Blythe	Riverside	899	42.83%	916	43.64%	277	13.20%	7	0.33%	-17	-0.81%	2,099	21.15%
Cabazon	Riverside	93	32.98%	148	52.48%	41	14.54%	0	0.00%	-55	-19.50%	282	13.83%
Coachella	Riverside	259	24.41%	720	67.86%	80	7.54%	2	0.19%	-461	-43.45%	1,061	23.99%
Corona	Riverside	4,493	50.92%	3,721	42.17%	603	6.83%	7	0.08%	772	8.75%	8,824	31.33%
Desert Hot Springs	Riverside	540	44.26%	558	45.74%	117	9.59%	5	0.41%	-18	-1.48%	1,220	16.01%
Elsinore	Riverside	451	31.15%	870	60.08%	92	6.35%	35	2.42%	-419	-28.94%	1,448	18.58%
Hemet	Riverside	3,715	62.25%	1,904	31.90%	345	5.78%	4	0.07%	1,811	30.35%	5,968	30.43%
Indian Wells	Riverside	237	81.16%	42	14.38%	13	4.45%	0	0.00%	195	66.78%	292	N/A
Indio	Riverside	1,578	46.30%	1,501	44.04%	325	9.54%	4	0.12%	77	2.26%	3,408	31.74%
Norco	Riverside	1,618	46.11%	1,377	39.24%	511	14.56%	3	0.09%	241	6.87%	3,509	N/A
Palm Springs	Riverside	4,777	56.62%	3,288	38.97%	364	4.31%	8	0.09%	1,489	17.65%	8,437	17.82%
Perris	Riverside	432	37.53%	589	51.17%	129	11.21%	1	0.09%	-157	-13.64%	1,151	17.18%
Riverside	Riverside	27,254	54.21%	19,850	39.48%	3,076	6.12%	99	0.20%	7,404	14.73%	50,279	27.52%
San Jacinto	Riverside	760	52.38%	571	39.35%	117	8.06%	3	0.21%	189	13.03%	1,451	25.41%
Unincorporated Area	Riverside	28,050	52.66%	20,093	37.72%	5,057	9.49%	70	0.13%	7,957	14.94%	53,270	28.50%
Unapportioned Absentees	Riverside	5,005	61.73%	2,343	28.90%	704	8.68%	56	0.69%	2,662	32.83%	8,108	37.37%
Folsom	Sacramento	900	43.23%	962	46.21%	215	10.33%	5	0.24%	-62	-2.98%	2,082	17.79%
Galt	Sacramento	460	45.91%	430	42.91%	111	11.08%	1	0.10%	30	2.99%	1,002	22.90%
Isleton	Sacramento	98	34.88%	169	60.14%	14	4.98%	0	0.00%	-71	-25.27%	281	22.47%
Sacramento	Sacramento	35,287	36.43%	55,361	57.16%	5,959	6.15%	251	0.26%	-20,074	-20.73%	96,858	19.10%
Unincorporated Area	Sacramento	54,444	45.05%	57,168	47.30%	8,999	7.45%	245	0.20%	-2,724	-2.25%	120,856	22.39%
Unapportioned Absentees	Sacramento	5,988	51.27%	4,679	40.06%	971	8.31%	42	0.36%	1,309	11.21%	11,680	39.11%
Hollister	San Benito	1,120	43.78%	1,268	49.57%	166	6.49%	4	0.16%	-148	-5.79%	2,558	23.16%
San Juan Bautista	San Benito	136	35.23%	235	60.88%	15	3.89%	0	0.00%	-99	-25.65%	386	30.89%
Unincorporated Area	San Benito	1,453	50.63%	1,180	41.11%	237	8.26%	0	0.00%	273	9.51%	2,870	20.70%
Unapportioned Absentees	San Benito	252	61.92%	126	30.96%	29	7.13%	0	0.00%	126	30.96%	407	42.62%
Barstow	San Bernardino	2,119	42.53%	2,280	45.76%	579	11.62%	4	0.08%	-161	-3.23%	4,982	27.15%
Chino	San Bernardino	2,385	52.25%	1,829	40.07%	337	7.38%	14	0.31%	556	12.18%	4,565	25.94%
Colton	San Bernardino	1,849	29.54%	3,900	62.30%	473	7.56%	38	0.61%	-2,051	-32.76%	6,260	17.74%
Fontana	San Bernardino	2,634	38.86%	3,375	49.79%	717	10.58%	52	0.77%	-741	-10.93%	6,778	22.97%
Montclair	San Bernardino	3,287	52.18%	2,339	37.13%	665	10.56%	8	0.13%	948	15.05%	6,299	23.98%
Needles	San Bernardino	472	41.59%	527	46.43%	135	11.89%	1	0.09%	-55	-4.85%	1,135	19.73%
Ontario	San Bernardino	10,196	51.49%	7,933	40.07%	1,632	8.24%	39	0.20%	2,263	11.43%	19,800	18.67%
Redlands	San Bernardino	8,491	61.23%	4,678	33.73%	680	4.90%	19	0.14%	3,813	27.49%	13,868	20.48%
Rialto	San Bernardino	4,463	47.61%	3,937	42.00%	942	10.05%	32	0.34%	526	5.61%	9,374	23.57%
San Bernardino	San Bernardino	14,302	41.37%	17,304	50.06%	2,812	8.13%	149	0.43%	-3,002	-8.68%	34,567	19.23%
Upland	San Bernardino	7,345	62.62%	3,687	31.43%	652	5.56%	46	0.39%	3,658	31.18%	11,730	20.94%
Victorville	San Bernardino	1,580	53.02%	1,074	36.04%	321	10.77%	5	0.17%	506	16.98%	2,980	17.13%
Unincorporated Area	San Bernardino	45,812	51.33%	33,167	37.16%	10,059	11.27%	215	0.24%	12,645	14.17%	89,253	26.30%
Unapportioned Absentees	San Bernardino	7,039	60.48%	3,388	29.11%	1,183	10.16%	28	0.24%	3,651	31.37%	11,638	39.66%
Carlsbad	San Diego	2,882	59.13%	1,651	33.87%	330	6.77%	11	0.23%	1,231	25.26%	4,874	20.32%
Chula Vista	San Diego	12,105	53.16%	8,712	38.26%	1,918	8.42%	35	0.15%	3,393	14.90%	22,770	16.84%
Coronado	San Diego	3,371	70.41%	1,162	24.27%	250	5.22%	5	0.10%	2,209	46.14%	4,788	19.86%
Del Mar	San Diego	1,018	59.78%	618	36.29%	49	2.88%	18	1.06%	400	23.49%	1,703	4.23%
El Cajon	San Diego	10,056	55.65%	6,503	35.99%	1,497	8.28%	13	0.07%	3,553	19.66%	18,069	23.28%
Escondido	San Diego	7,715	60.71%	4,118	32.40%	865	6.81%	10	0.08%	3,597	28.31%	12,708	18.14%
Imperial Beach	San Diego	1,962	46.33%	1,740	41.09%	525	12.40%	8	0.19%	222	5.24%	4,235	14.34%
La Mesa	San Diego	10,847	61.97%	5,612	32.06%	1,016	5.80%	30	0.17%	5,235	29.91%	17,505	16.47%
National City	San Diego	3,952	42.56%	4,320	46.52%	1,003	10.80%	11	0.12%	-368	-3.96%	9,286	16.01%
Oceanside	San Diego	6,402	57.45%	3,979	35.71%	751	6.74%	11	0.10%	2,423	21.74%	11,143	28.36%
San Diego	San Diego	124,769	54.10%	91,276	39.58%	14,019	6.08%	553	0.24%	33,493	14.52%	230,617	17.28%
San Marcos	San Diego	745	59.08%	401	31.80%	113	8.96%	2	0.16%	344	27.28%	1,261	20.31%
Vista	San Diego	5,117	62.36%	2,494	30.40%	582	7.09%	12	0.15%	2,623	31.97%	8,205	16.56%
Unincorporated Area	San Diego	53,262	59.40%	28,056	31.29%	8,194	9.14%	158	0.18%	25,206	28.11%	89,670	20.21%
Unapportioned Absentees	San Diego	17,337	64.92%	7,027	26.31%	2,228	8.34%	115	0.43%	10,310	38.60%	26,707	36.90%
San Francisco	San Francisco	100,970	33.88%	177,509	59.57%	17,332	5.82%	2,187	0.73%	-76,539	-25.68%	297,998	16.87%
Escalon	San Joaquin	416	50.18%	345	41.62%	68	8.20%	0	0.00%	71	8.56%	829	32.25%
Lodi	San Joaquin	7,365	64.36%	3,292	28.77%	771	6.74%	16	0.14%	4,073	35.59%	11,444	32.44%
Manteca	San Joaquin	1,869	42.61%	2,049	46.72%	465	10.60%	3	0.07%	-180	-4.10%	4,386	32.38%
Ripon	San Joaquin	636	67.37%	261	27.65%	47	4.98%	0	0.00%	375	39.72%	944	30.43%
Stockton	San Joaquin	14,773	43.86%	16,458	48.86%	2,373	7.04%	81	0.24%	-1,685	-5.00%	33,685	27.22%
Tracy	San Joaquin	2,185	42.42%	2,565	49.80%	393	7.63%	8	0.16%	-380	-7.38%	5,151	25.20%
Unincorporated Area	San Joaquin	17,756	46.74%	15,780	41.54%	4,392	11.56%	58	0.15%	1,976	5.20%	37,986	28.17%
Unapportioned Absentees	San Joaquin	2,293	56.74%	1,323	32.74%	414	10.24%	11	0.27%	970	24.00%	4,041	42.85%
Arroyo Grande	San Luis Obispo (Note: The sum of Humphrey’s votes across San Luis Obispo County municipalities is 1000 fewer than the official county-wide tally.)	1,420	54.32%	993	37.99%	191	7.31%	10	0.38%	427	16.34%	2,614	28.68%
Grover City	San Luis Obispo	698	40.87%	847	49.59%	155	9.07%	8	0.47%	-149	-8.72%	1,708	28.60%
Morro Bay	San Luis Obispo	1,495	49.19%	1,334	43.90%	210	6.91%	0	0.00%	161	5.30%	3,039	25.93%
El Paso de Robles	San Luis Obispo	1,421	58.77%	883	36.52%	113	4.67%	1	0.04%	538	22.25%	2,418	32.60%
Pismo Beach	San Luis Obispo	762	44.67%	703	41.21%	237	13.89%	4	0.23%	59	3.46%	1,706	19.79%
San Luis Obispo	San Luis Obispo	5,144	50.83%	4,580	45.26%	384	3.79%	12	0.12%	564	5.57%	10,120	30.04%
Unincorporated Area	San Luis Obispo	6,852	55.64%	4,537	36.84%	908	7.37%	18	0.15%	2,315	18.80%	12,315	35.21%
Unapportioned Absentees	San Luis Obispo	1,628	58.12%	951	33.95%	218	7.78%	4	0.14%	677	24.17%	2,801	47.99%
Atherton	San Mateo	2,725	70.16%	1,037	26.70%	79	2.03%	43	1.11%	1,688	43.46%	3,884	27.54%
Belmont	San Mateo	4,399	47.59%	4,190	45.33%	486	5.26%	169	1.83%	209	2.26%	9,244	28.38%
Brisbane	San Mateo	279	24.39%	632	55.24%	204	17.83%	29	2.53%	-353	-30.86%	1,144	13.69%
Burlingame	San Mateo	6,535	52.34%	5,147	41.22%	632	5.06%	172	1.38%	1,388	11.12%	12,486	22.01%
Colma	San Mateo	49	34.75%	67	47.52%	18	12.77%	7	4.96%	-18	-12.77%	141	14.40%
Daly City	San Mateo	6,666	31.47%	12,213	57.66%	1,806	8.53%	497	2.35%	-5,547	-26.19%	21,182	15.13%
Half Moon Bay	San Mateo	519	39.41%	640	48.60%	118	8.96%	40	3.04%	-121	-9.19%	1,317	38.43%
Hillsborough	San Mateo	3,233	74.29%	1,003	23.05%	89	2.05%	27	0.62%	2,230	51.24%	4,352	26.55%
Menlo Park	San Mateo	6,052	50.81%	5,223	43.85%	321	2.69%	316	2.65%	829	6.96%	11,912	30.14%
Millbrae	San Mateo	4,147	45.86%	4,168	46.10%	588	6.50%	139	1.54%	-21	-0.23%	9,042	22.68%
Pacifica	San Mateo	3,320	30.91%	5,985	55.73%	1,270	11.82%	165	1.54%	-2,665	-24.81%	10,740	16.66%
Portola Valley	San Mateo	1,117	58.64%	725	38.06%	40	2.10%	23	1.21%	392	20.58%	1,905	27.50%
Redwood City	San Mateo	9,206	42.94%	10,144	47.31%	1,500	7.00%	590	2.75%	-938	-4.37%	21,440	28.85%
San Bruno	San Mateo	4,807	35.91%	7,133	53.28%	1,251	9.34%	197	1.47%	-2,326	-17.37%	13,388	19.69%
San Carlos	San Mateo	6,539	53.65%	4,818	39.53%	610	5.00%	221	1.81%	1,721	14.12%	12,188	29.56%
San Mateo	San Mateo	15,172	46.56%	15,156	46.51%	1,659	5.09%	600	1.84%	16	0.05%	32,587	27.59%
South San Francisco	San Mateo	4,527	29.29%	8,960	57.98%	1,575	10.19%	392	2.54%	-4,433	-28.69%	15,454	18.17%
Woodside	San Mateo	1,342	61.73%	724	33.30%	86	3.96%	22	1.01%	618	28.43%	2,174	20.42%
Unincorporated Area	San Mateo	10,531	38.66%	14,102	51.78%	1,627	5.97%	977	3.59%	-3,571	-13.11%	27,237	24.85%
Unapportioned Absentees	San Mateo	7,489	58.60%	4,452	34.84%	761	5.96%	77	0.60%	3,037	23.77%	12,779	44.24%
Carpinteria	Santa Barbara	974	47.61%	980	47.90%	91	4.45%	1	0.05%	-6	-0.29%	2,046	N/A
Guadalupe	Santa Barbara	224	38.36%	336	57.53%	23	3.94%	1	0.17%	-112	-19.18%	584	26.27%
Lompoc	Santa Barbara	3,413	51.67%	2,409	36.47%	776	11.75%	7	0.11%	1,004	15.20%	6,605	23.55%
Santa Barbara	Santa Barbara	14,526	50.03%	13,438	46.28%	986	3.40%	86	0.30%	1,088	3.75%	29,036	24.55%
Santa Maria	Santa Barbara	5,880	55.57%	3,901	36.86%	793	7.49%	8	0.08%	1,979	18.70%	10,582	24.46%
Unincorporated Area	Santa Barbara	20,703	55.79%	14,271	38.46%	2,024	5.45%	109	0.29%	6,432	17.33%	37,107	25.62%
Unapportioned Absentees	Santa Barbara	4,348	62.07%	2,230	31.83%	390	5.57%	37	0.53%	2,118	30.24%	7,005	30.74%
Campbell	Santa Clara	3,453	44.73%	3,726	48.27%	524	6.79%	16	0.21%	-273	-3.54%	7,719	23.05%
Cupertino	Santa Clara	3,154	55.17%	2,316	40.51%	233	4.08%	14	0.24%	838	14.66%	5,717	26.24%
Gilroy	Santa Clara	1,562	42.38%	1,913	51.90%	206	5.59%	5	0.14%	-351	-9.52%	3,686	27.27%
Los Altos	Santa Clara	7,241	59.47%	4,521	37.13%	390	3.20%	23	0.19%	2,720	22.34%	12,175	24.70%
Los Altos Hills	Santa Clara	1,649	58.43%	1,074	38.06%	92	3.26%	7	0.25%	575	20.38%	2,822	21.43%
Los Gatos	Santa Clara	4,732	54.71%	3,547	41.01%	344	3.98%	26	0.30%	1,185	13.70%	8,649	22.13%
Milpitas	Santa Clara	1,999	34.32%	3,166	54.36%	647	11.11%	12	0.21%	-1,167	-20.04%	5,824	23.81%
Monte Sereno	Santa Clara	658	58.23%	436	38.58%	33	2.92%	3	0.27%	222	19.65%	1,130	21.38%
Morgan Hill	Santa Clara	660	43.91%	714	47.50%	127	8.45%	2	0.13%	-54	-3.59%	1,503	19.35%
Mountain View	Santa Clara	8,415	46.70%	8,566	47.54%	971	5.39%	66	0.37%	-151	-0.84%	18,018	29.08%
Palo Alto	Santa Clara	11,097	45.18%	12,582	51.23%	744	3.03%	138	0.56%	-1,485	-6.05%	24,561	21.17%
San Jose	Santa Clara	56,582	42.82%	68,071	51.51%	7,185	5.44%	316	0.24%	-11,489	-8.69%	132,154	21.98%
Santa Clara	Santa Clara	10,672	38.94%	14,949	54.55%	1,695	6.19%	88	0.32%	-4,277	-15.61%	27,404	20.19%
Saratoga	Santa Clara	6,552	62.92%	3,467	33.29%	367	3.52%	28	0.27%	3,085	29.62%	10,414	25.07%
Sunnyvale	Santa Clara	14,509	47.36%	14,287	46.63%	1,766	5.76%	74	0.24%	222	0.72%	30,636	24.15%
Unincorporated Area	Santa Clara	30,511	47.39%	30,176	46.87%	3,430	5.33%	268	0.42%	335	0.52%	64,385	28.00%
Capitola	Santa Cruz	1,163	52.67%	881	39.90%	149	6.75%	15	0.68%	282	12.77%	2,208	29.87%
Santa Cruz	Santa Cruz	6,392	50.91%	5,166	41.15%	912	7.26%	85	0.68%	1,226	9.77%	12,555	25.64%
Scotts Valley	Santa Cruz	792	60.88%	379	29.13%	126	9.68%	4	0.31%	413	31.74%	1,301	N/A
Watsonville	Santa Cruz	1,821	41.04%	2,446	55.13%	151	3.40%	19	0.43%	-625	-14.09%	4,437	25.29%
Unincorporated Area	Santa Cruz	13,521	51.35%	10,725	40.73%	1,937	7.36%	146	0.55%	2,796	10.62%	26,329	25.09%
Unapportioned Absentees	Santa Cruz	1,676	60.42%	895	32.26%	190	6.85%	13	0.47%	781	28.15%	2,774	36.74%
Anderson	Shasta	628	33.49%	1,061	56.59%	183	9.76%	3	0.16%	-433	-23.09%	1,875	20.79%
Redding	Shasta	2,564	43.57%	2,922	49.65%	395	6.71%	4	0.07%	-358	-6.08%	5,885	24.01%
Unincorporated Area	Shasta	7,649	39.27%	9,804	50.33%	2,016	10.35%	9	0.05%	-2,155	-11.06%	19,478	25.60%
Unapportioned Absentees	Shasta	980	50.83%	723	37.50%	221	11.46%	4	0.21%	257	13.33%	1,928	39.40%
Loyalton	Sierra	129	36.24%	210	58.99%	17	4.78%	0	0.00%	-81	-22.75%	356	50.21%
Unincorporated Area	Sierra	326	49.85%	278	42.51%	50	7.65%	0	0.00%	48	7.34%	654	24.41%
Unapportioned Absentees	Sierra	93	51.10%	71	39.01%	18	9.89%	0	0.00%	22	12.09%	182	14.79%
Dorris	Siskiyou	149	41.05%	171	47.11%	43	11.85%	0	0.00%	-22	-6.06%	363	17.84%
Dunsmuir	Siskiyou	288	31.48%	587	64.15%	40	4.37%	0	0.00%	-299	-32.68%	915	19.90%
Etna	Siskiyou	166	60.58%	93	33.94%	15	5.47%	0	0.00%	73	26.64%	274	33.68%
Fort Jones	Siskiyou	122	55.96%	83	38.07%	13	5.96%	0	0.00%	39	17.89%	218	22.78%
Montague	Siskiyou	168	48.55%	146	42.20%	31	8.96%	1	0.29%	22	6.36%	346	29.49%
Mt. Shasta	Siskiyou	390	39.92%	514	52.61%	71	7.27%	2	0.20%	-124	-12.69%	977	26.53%
Tulelake	Siskiyou	220	71.43%	68	22.08%	20	6.49%	0	0.00%	152	49.35%	308	21.55%
Weed	Siskiyou	262	22.30%	864	73.53%	48	4.09%	1	0.09%	-602	-51.23%	1,175	12.73%
Yreka	Siskiyou	1,146	56.23%	763	37.44%	127	6.23%	2	0.10%	383	18.79%	2,038	36.39%
Unincorporated Area	Siskiyou	2,903	48.13%	2,518	41.74%	603	10.00%	8	0.13%	385	6.38%	6,032	25.76%
Unapportioned Absentees	Siskiyou	520	49.48%	453	43.10%	77	7.33%	1	0.10%	67	6.37%	1,051	51.36%
Benicia	Solano	670	27.66%	1,343	55.45%	407	16.80%	2	0.08%	-673	-27.79%	2,422	16.20%
Dixon	Solano	661	50.57%	578	44.22%	66	5.05%	2	0.15%	83	6.35%	1,307	26.54%
Fairfield	Solano	2,898	38.40%	3,864	51.20%	777	10.30%	8	0.11%	-966	-12.80%	7,547	24.66%
Rio Vista	Solano	591	49.50%	530	44.39%	71	5.95%	2	0.17%	61	5.11%	1,194	20.90%
Suisun City	Solano	111	28.53%	241	61.95%	37	9.51%	0	0.00%	-130	-33.42%	389	17.34%
Vacaville	Solano	2,294	44.14%	2,481	47.74%	420	8.08%	2	0.04%	-187	-3.60%	5,197	28.36%
Vallejo	Solano	6,870	27.93%	14,635	59.50%	3,058	12.43%	34	0.14%	-7,765	-31.57%	24,597	13.65%
Unincorporated Area	Solano	2,069	43.49%	2,086	43.85%	588	12.36%	14	0.29%	-17	-0.36%	4,757	27.88%
Unapportioned Absentees	Solano	1,519	48.69%	1,213	38.88%	386	12.37%	2	0.06%	306	9.81%	3,120	44.23%
Cloverdale	Sonoma	436	40.82%	562	52.62%	69	6.46%	1	0.09%	-126	-11.80%	1,068	27.20%
Cotati	Sonoma	191	36.87%	266	51.35%	60	11.58%	1	0.19%	-75	-14.48%	518	28.90%
Healdsburg	Sonoma	1,150	53.44%	859	39.92%	140	6.51%	3	0.14%	291	13.52%	2,152	35.98%
Petaluma	Sonoma	3,576	44.09%	3,913	48.25%	613	7.56%	8	0.10%	-337	-4.16%	8,110	29.29%
Rohnert Park	Sonoma	555	38.95%	733	51.44%	137	9.61%	0	0.00%	-178	-12.49%	1,425	20.36%
Santa Rosa	Sonoma	10,420	52.52%	8,421	42.44%	969	4.88%	30	0.15%	1,999	10.08%	19,840	29.27%
Sebastopol	Sonoma	809	50.94%	658	41.44%	118	7.43%	3	0.19%	151	9.51%	1,588	26.39%
Sonoma	Sonoma	993	50.64%	849	43.29%	118	6.02%	1	0.05%	144	7.34%	1,961	26.37%
Unincorporated Area	Sonoma	17,143	47.23%	15,816	43.57%	3,253	8.96%	88	0.24%	1,327	3.66%	36,300	26.77%
Unapportioned Absentees	Sonoma	2,815	59.48%	1,510	31.90%	398	8.41%	10	0.21%	1,305	27.57%	4,733	45.92%
Ceres	Stanislaus	669	39.92%	870	51.91%	134	8.00%	3	0.18%	-201	-11.99%	1,676	32.97%
Modesto	Stanislaus	9,648	46.73%	9,971	48.29%	980	4.75%	48	0.23%	-323	-1.56%	20,647	27.01%
Newman	Stanislaus	280	34.61%	491	60.69%	36	4.45%	2	0.25%	-211	-26.08%	809	30.86%
Oakdale	Stanislaus	1,137	47.59%	1,105	46.25%	146	6.11%	1	0.04%	32	1.34%	2,389	30.86%
Patterson	Stanislaus	413	43.70%	501	53.02%	30	3.17%	1	0.11%	-88	-9.31%	945	18.83%
Riverbank	Stanislaus	251	27.08%	587	63.32%	89	9.60%	0	0.00%	-336	-36.25%	927	28.57%
Turlock	Stanislaus	2,815	57.17%	1,929	39.18%	174	3.53%	6	0.12%	886	17.99%	4,924	31.49%
Unincorporated Area	Stanislaus	12,682	42.69%	14,805	49.84%	2,166	7.29%	55	0.19%	-2,123	-7.15%	29,708	28.84%
Unapportioned Absentees	Stanislaus	1,678	56.63%	1,057	35.67%	218	7.36%	10	0.34%	621	20.96%	2,963	44.81%
Live Oak	Sutter	347	47.34%	305	41.61%	81	11.05%	0	0.00%	42	5.73%	733	18.94%
Yuba City	Sutter	2,682	58.66%	1,586	34.69%	298	6.52%	6	0.13%	1,096	23.97%	4,572	23.59%
Unincorporated Area	Sutter	5,114	60.76%	2,513	29.86%	784	9.31%	6	0.07%	2,601	30.90%	8,417	24.42%
Unapportioned Absentees	Sutter	522	64.68%	220	27.26%	65	8.05%	0	0.00%	302	37.42%	807	32.38%
Corning	Tehama	638	51.70%	504	40.84%	92	7.46%	0	0.00%	134	10.86%	1,234	25.62%
Red Bluff	Tehama	1,204	44.53%	1,229	45.45%	271	10.02%	0	0.00%	-25	-0.92%	2,704	29.66%
Tehama	Tehama	56	47.06%	51	42.86%	12	10.08%	0	0.00%	5	4.20%	119	19.83%
Unincorporated Area	Tehama	2,951	47.09%	2,545	40.61%	769	12.27%	2	0.03%	406	6.48%	6,267	23.57%
Unapportioned Absentees	Tehama	349	53.04%	236	35.87%	72	10.94%	1	0.15%	113	17.17%	658	42.93%
Unincorporated Area	Trinity	1,426	43.23%	1,433	43.44%	432	13.09%	8	0.24%	-7	-0.21%	3,299	26.72%
Dinuba	Tulare	1,826	56.90%	1,202	37.46%	176	5.48%	5	0.16%	624	19.45%	3,209	40.02%
Exeter	Tulare	831	55.03%	550	36.42%	127	8.41%	2	0.13%	281	18.61%	1,510	31.72%
Farmersville	Tulare	242	35.85%	310	45.93%	122	18.07%	1	0.15%	-68	-10.07%	675	34.98%
Lindsay	Tulare	913	55.74%	634	38.71%	86	5.25%	5	0.31%	279	17.03%	1,638	26.74%
Porterville	Tulare	1,887	56.35%	1,291	38.55%	169	5.05%	2	0.06%	596	17.80%	3,349	30.05%
Tulare	Tulare	1,709	36.16%	2,727	57.70%	288	6.09%	2	0.04%	-1,018	-21.54%	4,726	24.95%
Visalia	Tulare	5,352	59.30%	3,156	34.97%	515	5.71%	3	0.03%	2,196	24.33%	9,026	24.90%
Woodlake	Tulare	340	44.91%	343	45.31%	73	9.64%	1	0.13%	-3	-0.40%	757	26.37%
Unincorporated Area	Tulare	16,214	51.89%	11,967	38.30%	3,024	9.68%	43	0.14%	4,247	13.59%	31,248	35.85%
Sonora	Tuolumne	863	52.88%	672	41.18%	97	5.94%	0	0.00%	191	11.70%	1,632	38.08%
Unincorporated Area	Tuolumne	3,048	45.34%	2,967	44.14%	707	10.52%	0	0.00%	81	1.20%	6,722	27.54%
Unapportioned Absentees	Tuolumne	419	55.57%	274	36.34%	61	8.09%	0	0.00%	145	19.23%	754	48.81%
Camarillo	Ventura	3,252	57.81%	2,045	36.36%	325	5.78%	3	0.05%	1,207	21.46%	5,625	31.51%
Fillmore	Ventura	820	46.12%	839	47.19%	118	6.64%	1	0.06%	-19	-1.07%	1,778	25.41%
Ojai	Ventura	1,171	52.30%	940	41.98%	126	5.63%	2	0.09%	231	10.32%	2,239	24.83%
Oxnard	Ventura	7,023	41.16%	8,911	52.22%	1,123	6.58%	7	0.04%	-1,888	-11.06%	17,064	19.73%
Port Hueneme	Ventura	1,565	47.76%	1,465	44.71%	245	7.48%	2	0.06%	100	3.05%	3,277	29.87%
Santa Paula	Ventura	2,545	45.81%	2,683	48.30%	325	5.85%	2	0.04%	-138	-2.48%	5,555	23.73%
Thousand Oaks	Ventura	5,808	62.53%	2,836	30.53%	638	6.87%	7	0.08%	2,972	31.99%	9,289	22.02%
Ventura	Ventura	9,866	49.62%	8,966	45.09%	1,043	5.25%	10	0.05%	900	4.53%	19,885	28.28%
Unincorporated Area	Ventura	23,942	53.19%	17,271	38.37%	3,765	8.36%	32	0.07%	6,671	14.82%	45,010	29.87%
Unapportioned Absentees	Ventura	3,713	60.89%	1,838	30.14%	526	8.63%	21	0.34%	1,875	30.75%	6,098	37.38%
Davis	Yolo	2,714	38.49%	4,174	59.19%	127	1.80%	37	0.52%	-1,460	-20.70%	7,052	17.91%
Winters	Yolo	283	41.80%	342	50.52%	51	7.53%	1	0.15%	-59	-8.71%	677	29.73%
Woodland	Yolo	2,976	43.28%	3,561	51.79%	332	4.83%	7	0.10%	-585	-8.51%	6,876	26.78%
Unincorporated Area	Yolo	4,361	35.03%	6,954	55.86%	1,113	8.94%	20	0.16%	-2,593	-20.83%	12,448	21.19%
Unapportioned Absentees	Yolo	789	45.74%	802	46.49%	119	6.90%	15	0.87%	-13	-0.75%	1,725	31.16%
Marysville	Yuba	2,045	57.57%	1,258	35.42%	246	6.93%	3	0.08%	787	22.16%	3,552	22.66%
Wheatland	Yuba	150	38.96%	181	47.01%	54	14.03%	0	0.00%	-31	-8.05%	385	17.01%
Unincorporated Area	Yuba	2,769	43.06%	2,745	42.69%	909	14.14%	7	0.11%	24	0.37%	6,430	22.72%
Unapportioned Absentees	Yuba	407	52.65%	277	35.83%	87	11.25%	2	0.26%	130	16.82%	773	38.80%
Totals (Note: Statewide candidate vote percentages and the total vote number differ here because California's Supplement to Statement of Vote does not count write in votes as part of the city totals.)		3,468,561	47.98%	3,245,719	44.90%	487,240	6.74%	27,707	0.38%	222,842	3.08%	7,229,227	21.41%

===== Cities & Unincorporated Areas that flipped from Democratic to Republican =====
- Alameda (Alameda)
- Livermore (Alameda)
- Pleasanton (Alameda)
- Ione (Amador)
- Biggs (Butte)
- Chico (Butte)
- Gridley (Butte)
- Oroville (Butte)
- Unincorporated Area (Butte)
- Angels (Calaveras)
- Unincorporated Area (Calaveras)
- Colusa (Colusa)
- Williams (Colusa)
- Unincorporated Area (Colusa)
- Clayton (Contra Costa)
- Hercules (Contra Costa)
- Pleasant Hill (Contra Costa)
- Walnut Creek (Contra Costa)
- Unincorporated Area (Contra Costa)
- Crescent City (Del Norte)
- Unincorporated Area (Del Norte)
- Placerville (El Dorado)
- Unincorporated Area (El Dorado)
- Kingsburg (Fresno)
- Reedley (Fresno)
- Unincorporated Area (Fresno)
- Orland (Glenn)
- Willows (Glenn)
- Unincorporated Area (Glenn)
- Ferndale (Humboldt)
- Fortuna (Humboldt)
- Unincorporated Area (Humboldt)
- Brawley (Imperial)
- Holtville (Imperial)
- Imperial (Imperial)
- Westmorland (Imperial)
- Unincorporated Area (Inyo)
- Bakersfield (Kern)
- McFarland (Kern)
- Ridgecrest (Kern)
- Shafter (Kern)
- Taft (Kern)
- Tehachapi (Kern)
- Wasco (Kern)
- Unincorporated Area (Kern)
- Lakeport (Lake)
- Unincorporated Area (Lake)
- Artesia (Los Angeles)
- Avalon (Los Angeles)
- Bell (Los Angeles)
- Bellflower (Los Angeles)
- Culver City (Los Angeles)
- Duarte (Los Angeles)
- Gardena (Los Angeles)
- Hawthorne (Los Angeles)
- Huntington Park (Los Angeles)
- Industry (Los Angeles)
- La Verne (Los Angeles)
- Lakewood (Los Angeles)
- Lomita (Los Angeles)
- Long Beach (Los Angeles)
- Lynwood (Los Angeles)
- Palmdale (Los Angeles)
- Pomona (Los Angeles)
- Redondo Beach (Los Angeles)
- San Dimas (Los Angeles)
- Santa Monica (Los Angeles)
- Signal Hill (Los Angeles)
- South Gate (Los Angeles)
- Unincorporated Area (Los Angeles)
- Unincorporated Area (Madera)
- Corte Madera (Marin)
- Larkspur (Marin)
- Novato (Marin)
- San Rafael (Marin)
- Tiburon (Marin)
- Unincorporated Area (Marin)
- Unincorporated Area (Mariposa)
- Willits (Mendocino)
- Unincorporated Area (Mendocino)
- Del Rey Oaks (Monterey)
- Greenfield (Monterey)
- King City (Monterey)
- Monterey (Monterey)
- Pacific Grove (Monterey)
- Salinas (Monterey)
- Unincorporated Area (Monterey)
- Calistoga (Napa)
- St. Helena (Napa)
- Unincorporated Area (Napa)
- Grass Valley (Nevada)
- Nevada City (Nevada)
- Unincorporated Area (Nevada)
- Buena Park (Orange)
- Cypress (Orange)
- Garden Grove (Orange)
- Los Alamitos (Orange)
- Stanton (Orange)
- Westminster (Orange)
- Auburn (Placer)
- Unincorporated Area (Placer)
- Banning (Riverside)
- Beaumont (Riverside)
- Corona (Riverside)
- Hemet (Riverside)
- Indio (Riverside)
- Palm Springs (Riverside)
- Riverside (Riverside)
- San Jacinto (Riverside)
- Unincorporated Area (Riverside)
- Galt (Sacramento)
- Unincorporated Area (San Benito)
- Chino (San Bernardino)
- Montclair (San Bernardino)
- Ontario (San Bernardino)
- Rialto (San Bernardino)
- Victorville (San Bernardino)
- Unincorporated Area (San Bernardino)
- Chula Vista (San Diego)
- El Cajon (San Diego)
- Imperial Beach (San Diego)
- Oceanside (San Diego)
- San Diego (San Diego)
- Escalon (San Joaquin)
- Unincorporated Area (San Joaquin)
- Arroyo Grande (San Luis Obispo)
- El Paso de Robles (San Luis Obispo)
- Morro Bay (San Luis Obispo)
- Pismo Beach (San Luis Obispo)
- San Luis Obispo (San Luis Obispo)
- Unincorporated Area (San Luis Obispo)
- Belmont (San Mateo)
- Burlingame (San Mateo)
- Menlo Park (San Mateo)
- Portola Valley (San Mateo)
- San Carlos (San Mateo)
- San Mateo (San Mateo)
- Lompoc (Santa Barbara)
- Santa Barbara (Santa Barbara)
- Santa Maria (Santa Barbara)
- Unincorporated Area (Santa Barbara)
- Cupertino (Santa Clara)
- Los Altos Hills (Santa Clara)
- Los Altos (Santa Clara)
- Los Gatos (Santa Clara)
- Monte Sereno (Santa Clara)
- Sunnyvale (Santa Clara)
- Unincorporated Area (Santa Clara)
- Capitola (Santa Cruz)
- Santa Cruz (Santa Cruz)
- Unincorporated Area (Santa Cruz)
- Unincorporated Area (Sierra)
- Etna (Siskiyou)
- Fort Jones (Siskiyou)
- Montague (Siskiyou)
- Yreka (Siskiyou)
- Unincorporated Area (Siskiyou)
- Dixon (Solano)
- Rio Vista (Solano)
- Healdsburg (Sonoma)
- Santa Rosa (Sonoma)
- Sebastopol (Sonoma)
- Sonoma (Sonoma)
- Unincorporated Area (Sonoma)
- Oakdale (Stanislaus)
- Turlock (Stanislaus)
- Live Oak (Sutter)
- Corning (Tehama)
- Tehama (Tehama)
- Unincorporated Area (Tehama)
- Dinuba (Tulare)
- Exeter (Tulare)
- Lindsay (Tulare)
- Porterville (Tulare)
- Visalia (Tulare)
- Unincorporated Area (Tulare)
- Sonora (Tuolumne)
- Unincorporated Area (Tuolumne)
- Camarillo (Ventura)
- Ojai (Ventura)
- Port Hueneme (Ventura)
- Ventura (Ventura)
- Unincorporated Area (Ventura)
- Marysville (Yuba)
- Unincorporated Area (Yuba)
