= 1952 United States presidential election in California =

- November 4, 1952
- Turnout: 86.85% (of registered voters) ▲6.31 pp 74.07% (of eligible voters) ▲7.30 pp

| Nominee | Dwight D. Eisenhower | Adlai Stevenson |
| Party | Republican | Democratic |
| Home state | New York | Illinois |
| Running mate | Richard Nixon | John Sparkman |
| Electoral vote | 32 | 0 |
| Popular vote | 2,897,310 | 2,197,548 |
| Percentage | 56.35% | 42.74% |
County results
Eisenhower
40–50%
50–60%
60–70%
70–80%
80–90%
Stevenson
40–50%
50–60%
President before election
Harry S. Truman
Democratic
Elected President
Dwight D. Eisenhower
Republican

The 1952 United States presidential election in California took place on November 4, 1952, as part of the 1952 United States presidential election. State voters chose 32 representatives, or electors, to the Electoral College, who voted for president and vice president.

California voted for the Republican nominee, former Allied Supreme Commander Dwight D. Eisenhower (with California Senator Richard Nixon as his running mate), in a landslide over the Democratic nominee, Illinois Governor Adlai Stevenson. As of the 2024 presidential election, this is the last time that Yolo County has voted Republican in a presidential election, the longest Republican drought for any county in the state.

This was the first presidential election in which any nominee received over a million votes in Los Angeles County. Eisenhower was also the first Republican to secure the state since Herbert Hoover in 1928.

== Results ==
1952 United States presidential election in California
| Party | Candidate | Votes | Percentage | Electoral votes |
|---|---|---|---|---|
| Republican | Dwight D. Eisenhower | 2,897,310 | 56.35% | 32 |
| Democratic | Adlai Stevenson | 2,197,548 | 42.74% | 0 |
| Progressive | Vincent Hallinan | 24,106 | 0.47% | 0 |
| Prohibition | Stuart Hamblen | 15,653 | 0.30% | 0 |
| No party | Write-ins | 3,249 | 0.06% | 0 |
| Constitution | Douglas MacArthur | 3,504 | 0.07% | 0 |
| Socialist Labour | Eric Hass | 273 | 0.01% | 0 |
| Socialist | Darlington Hoopes | 206 | 0.00% | 0 |
| Invalid or blank votes | | | | — |
| Totals | | 5,141,849 | 100.00% | 32 |
| Voter turnout | | | | — |

=== Results by county ===
| County | Dwight D. Eisenhower Republican | | Adlai Stevenson Democratic | | Various candidates Other parties | | Margin | | Total votes cast |
| County | # | % | # | % | # | % | # | % | Total votes cast |
|---|---|---|---|---|---|---|---|---|---|
| Alameda | 201,976 | 52.69% | 178,239 | 46.50% | 3,079 | 0.81% | 23,737 | 6.19% | 383,294 |
| Alpine | 148 | 88.10% | 20 | 11.90% | 0 | 0.00% | 128 | 76.20% | 168 |
| Amador | 2,440 | 52.42% | 2,169 | 46.60% | 46 | 0.98% | 271 | 5.82% | 4,655 |
| Butte | 19,248 | 63.27% | 10,913 | 35.87% | 263 | 0.86% | 8,335 | 27.40% | 30,424 |
| Calaveras | 3,112 | 61.65% | 1,890 | 37.44% | 46 | 0.91% | 1,222 | 24.21% | 5,048 |
| Colusa | 2,824 | 59.81% | 1,881 | 39.83% | 17 | 0.36% | 943 | 19.98% | 4,722 |
| Contra Costa | 70,094 | 49.61% | 70,416 | 49.84% | 786 | 0.55% | -322 | -0.23% | 141,296 |
| Del Norte | 2,938 | 63.44% | 1,640 | 35.41% | 35 | 1.15% | 1,298 | 28.03% | 4,613 |
| El Dorado | 5,203 | 60.51% | 3,297 | 38.35% | 98 | 1.14% | 1,906 | 22.16% | 8,598 |
| Fresno | 54,626 | 48.95% | 56,135 | 50.30% | 837 | 0.75% | -1,509 | -1.35% | 111,598 |
| Glenn | 4,454 | 64.45% | 2,422 | 35.05% | 35 | 0.50% | 2,032 | 29.40% | 6,911 |
| Humboldt | 19,949 | 60.10% | 12,949 | 39.01% | 293 | 0.89% | 7,000 | 21.09% | 33,191 |
| Imperial | 11,044 | 62.13% | 6,619 | 37.24% | 112 | 0.63% | 4,425 | 24.89% | 17,775 |
| Inyo | 3,819 | 68.87% | 1,698 | 30.62% | 28 | 0.51% | 2,121 | 38.25% | 5,545 |
| Kern | 46,497 | 55.13% | 37,240 | 44.16% | 602 | 0.71% | 9,257 | 10.97% | 84,339 |
| Kings | 7,708 | 49.19% | 7,850 | 50.09% | 113 | 0.72% | -142 | -0.90% | 15,671 |
| Lake | 4,367 | 67.52% | 2,038 | 31.51% | 63 | 0.97% | 2,329 | 36.01% | 6,468 |
| Lassen | 3,313 | 43.66% | 4,237 | 55.83% | 39 | 0.51% | -924 | -12.17% | 7,589 |
| Los Angeles | 1,278,407 | 56.21% | 971,408 | 42.71% | 24,725 | 1.08% | 306,999 | 13.50% | 2,274,540 |
| Madera | 6,278 | 49.67% | 6,244 | 49.40% | 118 | 0.93% | 34 | 0.27% | 12,640 |
| Marin | 31,178 | 67.08% | 14,824 | 31.90% | 475 | 1.02% | 16,354 | 35.18% | 46,477 |
| Mariposa | 2,214 | 65.91% | 1,102 | 32.81% | 43 | 1.28% | 1,112 | 33.10% | 3,359 |
| Mendocino | 10,897 | 60.87% | 6,813 | 38.06% | 191 | 1.07% | 4,084 | 22.81% | 17,901 |
| Merced | 13,512 | 53.26% | 11,639 | 45.88% | 219 | 0.86% | 1,873 | 7.38% | 25,370 |
| Modoc | 2,634 | 61.36% | 1,633 | 38.04% | 26 | 0.60% | 1,001 | 23.32% | 4,293 |
| Mono | 891 | 76.61% | 264 | 22.70% | 8 | 0.69% | 627 | 53.91% | 1,163 |
| Monterey | 30,578 | 62.51% | 18,051 | 36.90% | 286 | 0.59% | 12,527 | 25.61% | 48,915 |
| Napa | 14,065 | 61.46% | 8,655 | 37.82% | 163 | 0.72% | 5,410 | 23.64% | 22,883 |
| Nevada | 6,819 | 64.04% | 3,735 | 35.08% | 94 | 0.88% | 3,084 | 28.96% | 10,648 |
| Orange | 80,994 | 70.29% | 33,397 | 28.98% | 844 | 0.73% | 47,597 | 41.31% | 115,235 |
| Placer | 9,841 | 50.59% | 9,444 | 48.55% | 168 | 0.86% | 397 | 2.04% | 19,453 |
| Plumas | 2,687 | 43.46% | 3,435 | 55.56% | 61 | 0.98% | -748 | -12.10% | 6,183 |
| Riverside | 51,692 | 65.08% | 26,948 | 33.93% | 788 | 0.99% | 24,744 | 31.15% | 79,428 |
| Sacramento | 67,207 | 49.02% | 69,066 | 50.37% | 837 | 0.61% | -1,859 | -1.35% | 137,110 |
| San Benito | 3,733 | 65.23% | 1,968 | 34.39% | 22 | 0.38% | 1,765 | 30.84% | 5,723 |
| San Bernardino | 77,718 | 57.34% | 56,663 | 41.81% | 1,153 | 0.85% | 21,055 | 15.53% | 135,534 |
| San Diego | 186,091 | 63.50% | 105,255 | 35.92% | 1,688 | 0.58% | 80,836 | 27.58% | 293,034 |
| San Francisco | 198,158 | 52.88% | 172,312 | 45.99% | 4,230 | 1.13% | 25,846 | 6.89% | 374,700 |
| San Joaquin | 45,512 | 55.82% | 35,432 | 43.46% | 587 | 0.72% | 10,080 | 12.36% | 81,531 |
| San Luis Obispo | 17,716 | 65.37% | 9,174 | 33.85% | 213 | 0.78% | 8,542 | 31.52% | 27,103 |
| San Mateo | 92,279 | 63.61% | 52,149 | 35.95% | 651 | 0.44% | 40,130 | 27.66% | 145,079 |
| Santa Barbara | 32,160 | 67.24% | 15,490 | 32.39% | 179 | 0.37% | 16,670 | 34.85% | 47,829 |
| Santa Clara | 91,940 | 59.74% | 61,035 | 39.66% | 932 | 0.60% | 30,905 | 20.08% | 153,907 |
| Santa Cruz | 24,353 | 67.13% | 11,536 | 31.80% | 391 | 1.07% | 12,817 | 35.33% | 36,280 |
| Shasta | 10,073 | 56.43% | 7,656 | 42.89% | 122 | 0.68% | 2,417 | 13.54% | 17,851 |
| Sierra | 822 | 53.76% | 698 | 45.65% | 9 | 0.59% | 124 | 8.11% | 1,529 |
| Siskiyou | 8,735 | 55.69% | 6,800 | 43.35% | 151 | 0.96% | 1,935 | 12.34% | 15,686 |
| Solano | 19,369 | 42.37% | 26,130 | 57.16% | 216 | 0.47% | -6,761 | -14.79% | 45,715 |
| Sonoma | 35,605 | 66.09% | 17,675 | 32.81% | 594 | 1.10% | 17,930 | 33.28% | 53,874 |
| Stanislaus | 29,270 | 55.57% | 22,837 | 43.35% | 570 | 1.08% | 6,433 | 12.22% | 52,677 |
| Sutter | 7,053 | 67.31% | 3,382 | 32.27% | 44 | 0.42% | 3,671 | 35.04% | 10,479 |
| Tehama | 5,742 | 64.31% | 3,110 | 34.83% | 77 | 0.86% | 2,632 | 29.48% | 8,929 |
| Trinity | 1,697 | 57.14% | 1,242 | 41.82% | 31 | 1.04% | 455 | 15.32% | 2,970 |
| Tulare | 30,108 | 57.07% | 22,208 | 42.10% | 437 | 0.83% | 7,900 | 14.97% | 52,753 |
| Tuolumne | 4,050 | 59.18% | 2,735 | 39.96% | 59 | 0.86% | 1,315 | 19.22% | 6,844 |
| Ventura | 24,534 | 52.47% | 21,967 | 46.98% | 256 | 0.55% | 2,567 | 5.49% | 46,757 |
| Yolo | 9,375 | 53.17% | 8,119 | 46.04% | 139 | 0.79% | 1,256 | 7.13% | 17,633 |
| Yuba | 5,840 | 60.42% | 3,762 | 38.92% | 63 | 0.66% | 2,078 | 21.50% | 9,665 |
| Total | 3,035,587 | 56.35% | 2,257,646 | 42.74% | 48,352 | 0.91% | 777,941 | 13.61% | 5,341,585 |

==== Counties that flipped from Democratic to Republican ====
- Alameda
- Amador
- Calaveras
- Colusa
- El Dorado
- Humboldt
- Los Angeles
- Madera
- Kern
- Merced
- Modoc
- Placer
- San Francisco
- Sierra
- Siskiyou
- Shasta
- Tulare
- Ventura
- Yuba
- Yolo
- Trinity

== See also ==
- United States presidential elections in California
