= 1868 United States presidential election in California =

- November 3, 1868
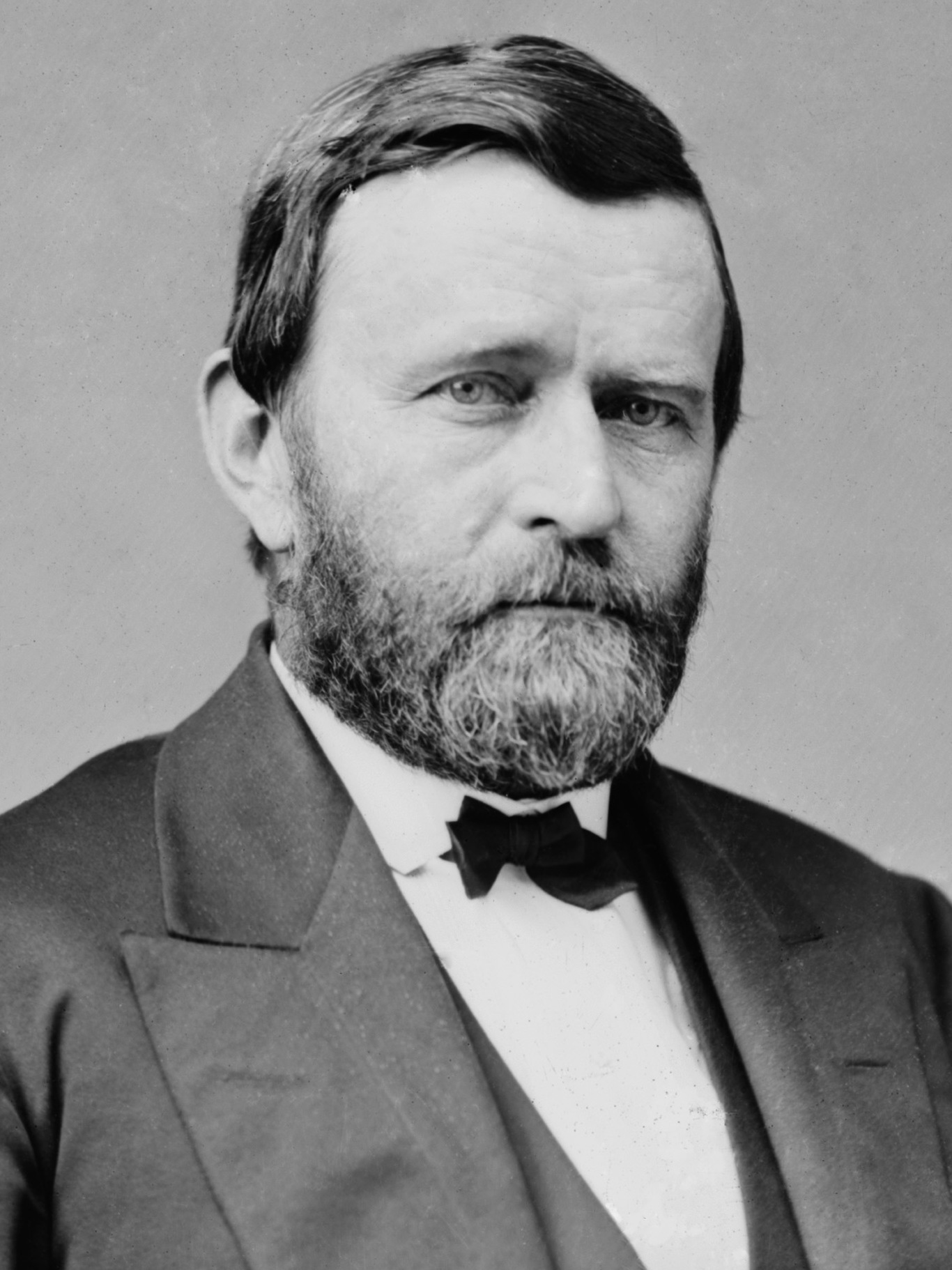

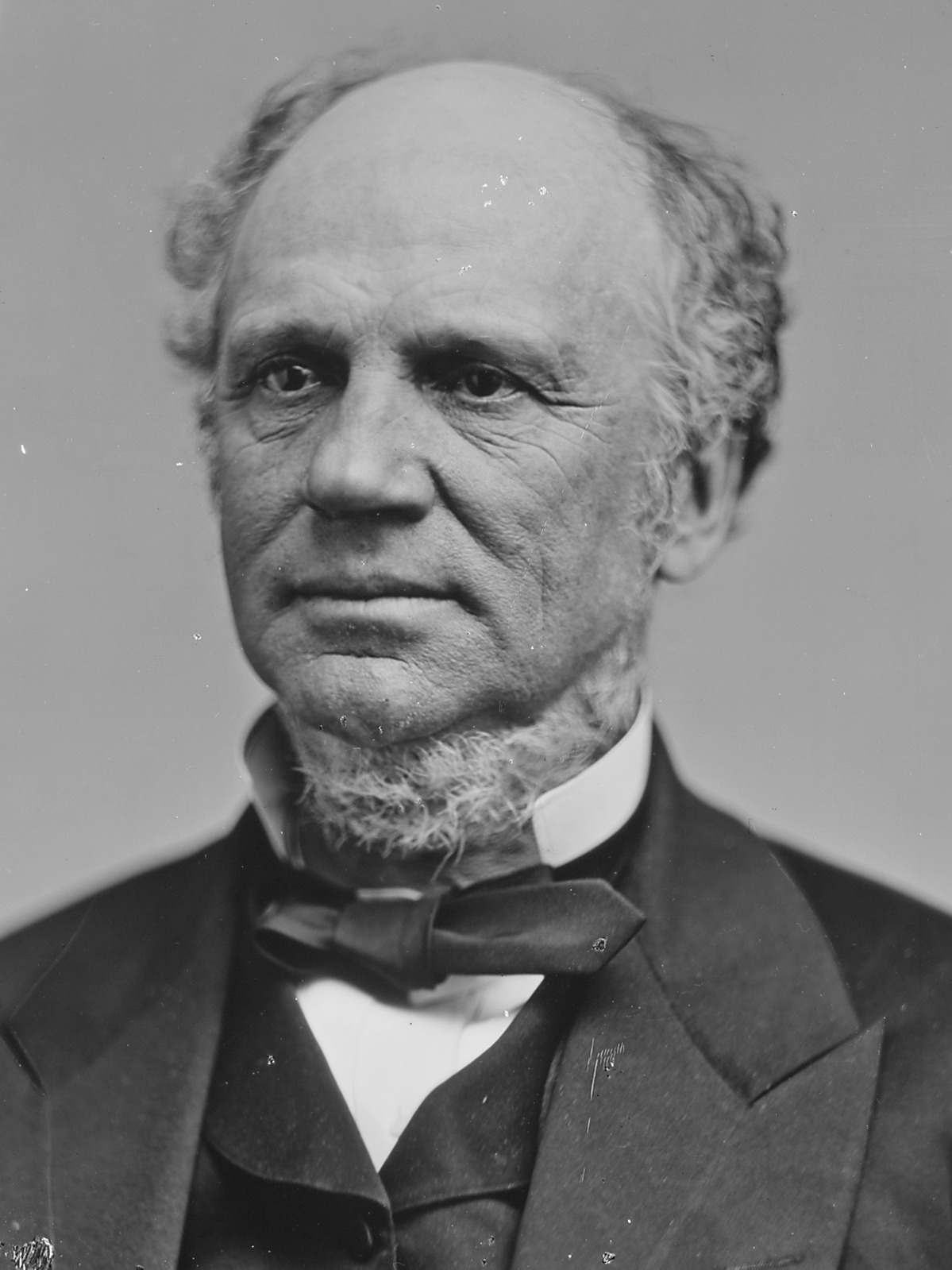
Nominee	Ulysses S. Grant	Horatio Seymour
Party	Republican	Democratic
Home state	Illinois	New York
Running mate	Schuyler Colfax	Francis Preston Blair Jr.
Electoral vote	5	0
Popular vote	54,592	54,078
Percentage	50.24%	49.76%
County results
Grant
50–60%
60–70%
Seymour
50–60%
60–70%
70–80%
80–90%
President before election
Andrew Johnson
Democratic
Elected President
Ulysses S. Grant
Republican

The 1868 United States presidential election in California was held on November 3, 1868, as part of the 1868 United States presidential election. State voters chose five representatives, or electors, to the Electoral College, who voted for president and vice president.

California narrowly voted for the Republican nominee, Union general Ulysses S. Grant, over the Democratic nominee, DNC chair Horatio Seymour by a margin barely over 500 votes. Additionally, this was the last time until 1968 where a Republican won the White House without carrying Santa Clara County.

== Results ==
General Election Results
Party	Pledged to	Elector	Votes
Republican Party	Ulysses S. Grant	Alfred Reddington	54,592
Republican Party	Ulysses S. Grant	John B. Felton	54,588
Republican Party	Ulysses S. Grant	O. H. La Grange	54,576
Republican Party	Ulysses S. Grant	D. B. Hoffman	54,565 (Note: Combined total for "D.B. Hoffman" and "D.A. Hoffman". The split was 41,518 for D.B. Hoffman and 13,047 for D.A. Hoffman. The California Supreme Court ordered the Secretary of State to treat the votes for D.A. Hoffman as having been for D.B. Hoffman. Had these figures not been combined, Thomas J. Henley would have been elected instead.)
Republican Party	Ulysses S. Grant	Charles Westmoreland	54,551
Democratic Party	Horatio Seymour	Thomas J. Henley	54,078
Democratic Party	Horatio Seymour	W. T. Wallace	54,069
Democratic Party	Horatio Seymour	E. J. C. Kewen	54,068
Democratic Party	Horatio Seymour	A. D. Dibble	54,068
Democratic Party	Horatio Seymour	George Pearce	54,061
Votes cast (Note: Based on totals for highest elector on each ticket)			108,670

=== Results by county ===
County	Ulysses S. Grant Republican		Horatio Seymour Democratic		Margin		Total votes cast (Note: Based on highest elector on each ticket)
County	#	%	#	%	#	%	Total votes cast
Alameda	1,860	59.58%	1,262	40.42%	598	19.15%	3,122
Alpine	154	69.68%	67	30.32%	87	39.37%	221
Amador	1,110	47.56%	1,224	52.44%	-114	-4.88%	2,334
Butte	1,279	50.67%	1,245	49.33%	34	1.35%	2,524
Calaveras	1,143	52.12%	1,050	47.88%	93	4.24%	2,193
Colusa	359	33.93%	699	66.07%	−340	−32.14%	1,058
Contra Costa	1,091	59.65%	738	40.35%	353	19.30%	1,829
Del Norte	162	48.36%	173	51.64%	-11	-3.28%	335
El Dorado	1,676	49.90%	1,683	50.10%	-7	-0.21%	3,359
Fresno	72	15.89%	381	84.11%	−309	−68.21%	453
Humboldt	769	60.27%	507	39.73%	262	20.53%	1,276
Inyo	113	53.05%	100	46.95%	13	6.10%	213
Kern	208	33.02%	422	66.98%	−214	−33.97%	630
Klamath	137	42.28%	187	57.72%	−50	−15.43%	324
Lake	248	35.33%	454	64.67%	−206	−29.34%	702
Lassen	210	63.25%	122	36.75%	88	26.51%	332
Los Angeles	748	37.70%	1,236	62.30%	-488	-24.60%	1,984
Marin	528	54.94%	433	45.06%	95	9.89%	961
Mariposa	456	40.75%	663	59.25%	-207	-18.50%	1,119
Mendocino	621	38.26%	1,002	61.74%	−381	−23.48%	1,623
Merced	98	26.49%	272	73.51%	−174	−47.03%	370
Mono	148	62.45%	89	37.55%	59	24.89%	237
Monterey	580	46.66%	663	53.34%	-83	-6.68%	1,243
Napa	752	52.37%	684	47.63%	68	4.74%	1,436
Nevada	3,014	55.11%	2,455	44.89%	559	10.22%	5,469
Placer	1,987	61.71%	1,233	38.29%	754	23.42%	3,220
Plumas	712	56.24%	554	43.76%	158	12.48%	1,266
Sacramento	3,207	59.14%	2,216	40.86%	991	18.27%	5,423
San Bernardino	263	41.03%	378	58.97%	-115	-17.94%	641
San Diego	129	35.44%	235	64.56%	-106	-29.12%	364
San Francisco	12,183	47.29%	13,582	52.71%	-1,399	-5.43%	25,765
San Joaquin	2,101	52.95%	1,867	47.05%	234	5.90%	3,968
San Luis Obispo	372	51.88%	345	48.12%	27	3.77%	717
San Mateo	628	60.10%	417	39.90%	211	20.19%	1,045
Santa Barbara	428	58.71%	301	41.29%	127	17.42%	729
Santa Clara	2,307	49.75%	2,330	50.25%	-23	-0.50%	4,637
Santa Cruz	1,153	61.01%	737	38.99%	416	22.01%	1,890
Shasta	638	53.43%	556	46.57%	82	6.87%	1,194
Sierra	1,328	62.58%	794	37.42%	534	25.16%	2,122
Siskiyou	835	47.63%	918	52.37%	-83	-4.73%	1,753
Solano	1,541	51.64%	1,443	48.36%	98	3.28%	2,984
Sonoma	1,799	42.82%	2,402	57.18%	-603	-14.35%	4,201
Stanislaus	350	35.28%	642	64.72%	−292	−29.44%	992
Sutter	581	50.88%	561	49.12%	20	1.75%	1,142
Tehama	351	46.86%	398	53.14%	-47	-6.28%	749
Trinity	505	56.36%	391	43.64%	114	12.72%	896
Tulare	338	33.24%	679	66.76%	−341	−33.53%	1,017
Tuolumne	994	47.13%	1,115	52.87%	-121	-5.74%	2,109
Yolo	995	48.39%	1,061	51.61%	-66	-3.21%	2,056
Yuba	1,331	54.48%	1,112	45.82%	219	8.96%	2,443
Total	54,592	50.24%	54,078	49.76%	514	0.47%	108,670

==== Counties that flipped from Republican to Democratic ====
- Amador
- Del Norte
- El Dorado
- Klamath
- Monterey
- San Francisco
- Santa Clara
- Tehama
- Tuolumne
- Yolo
