= Fresno, California =

City in California, United States

Fresno
- City
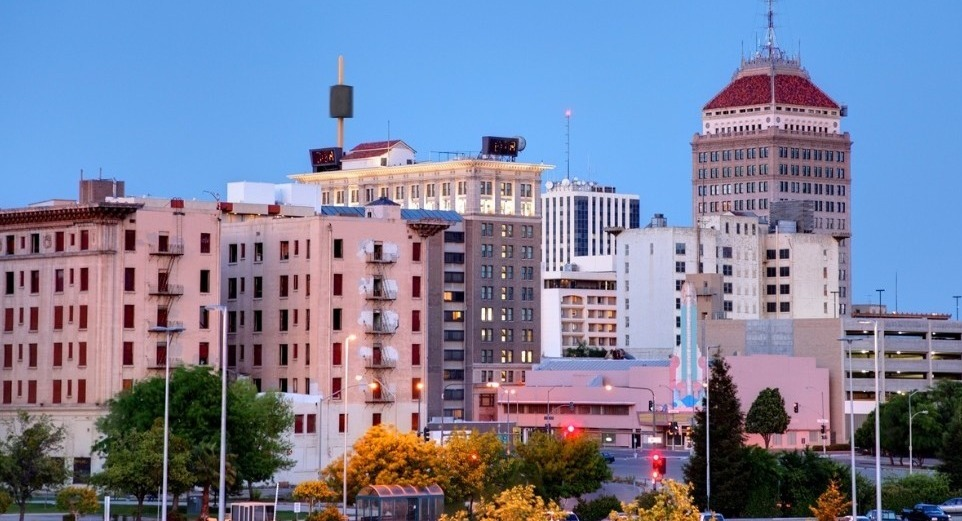
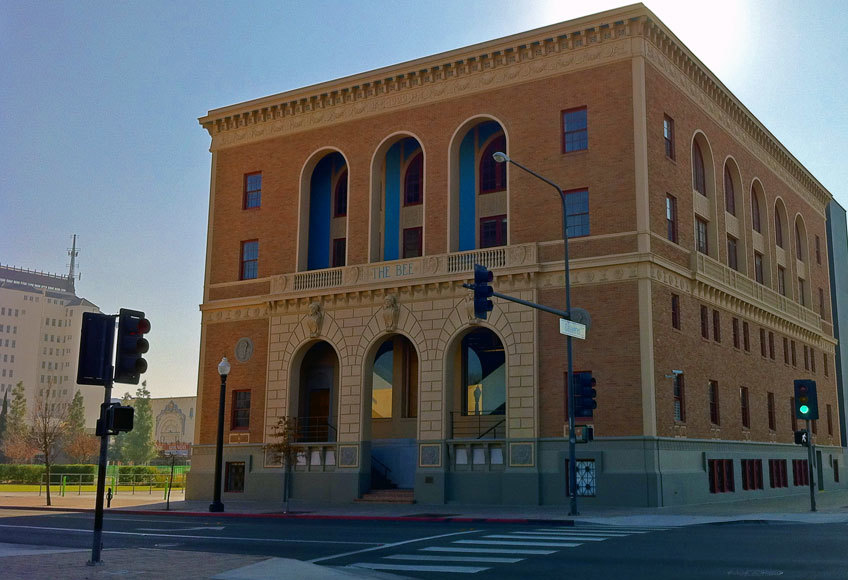
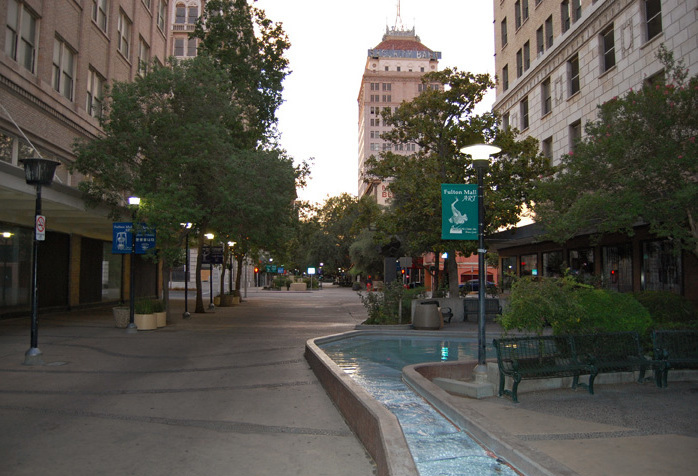
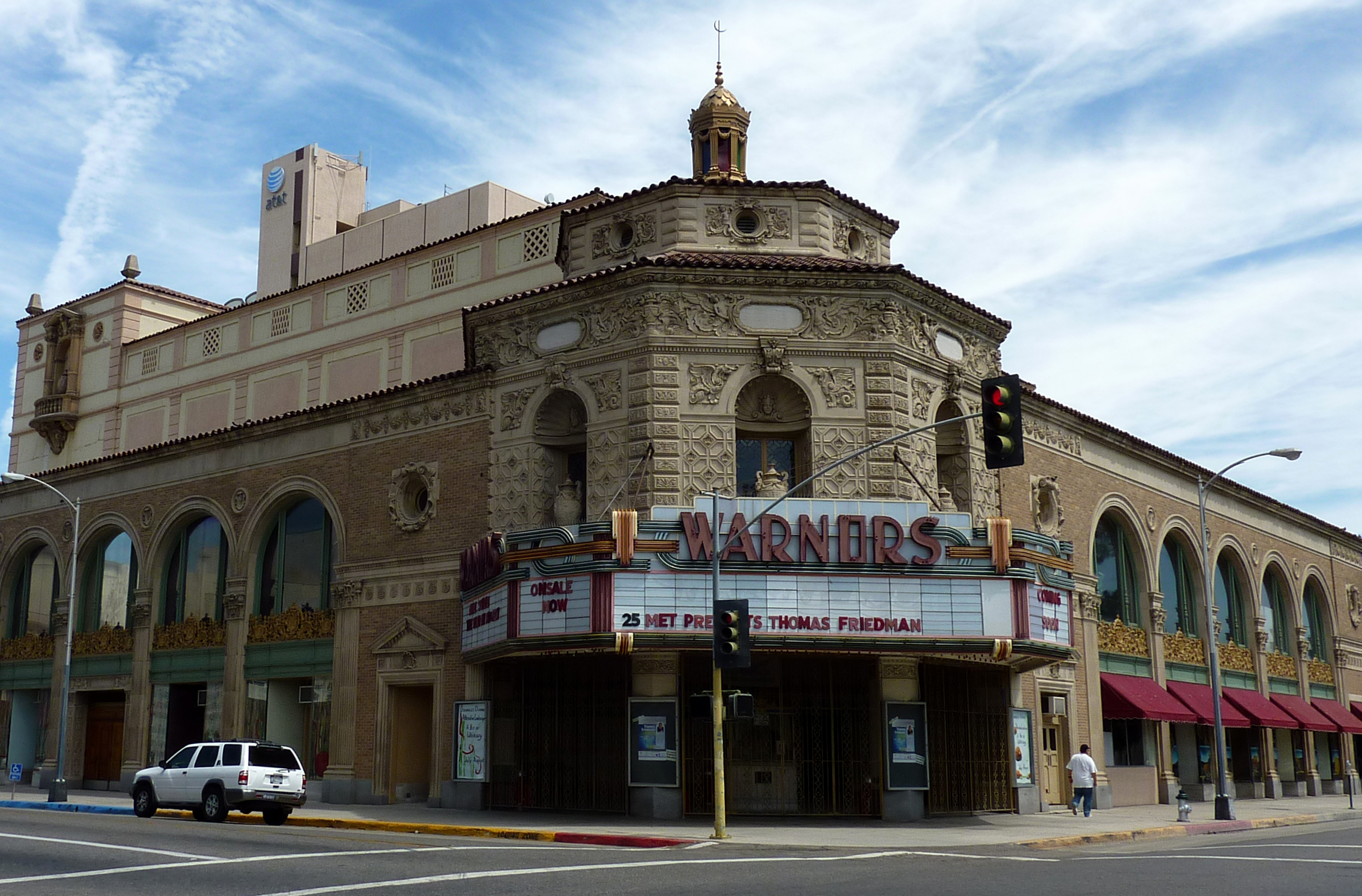
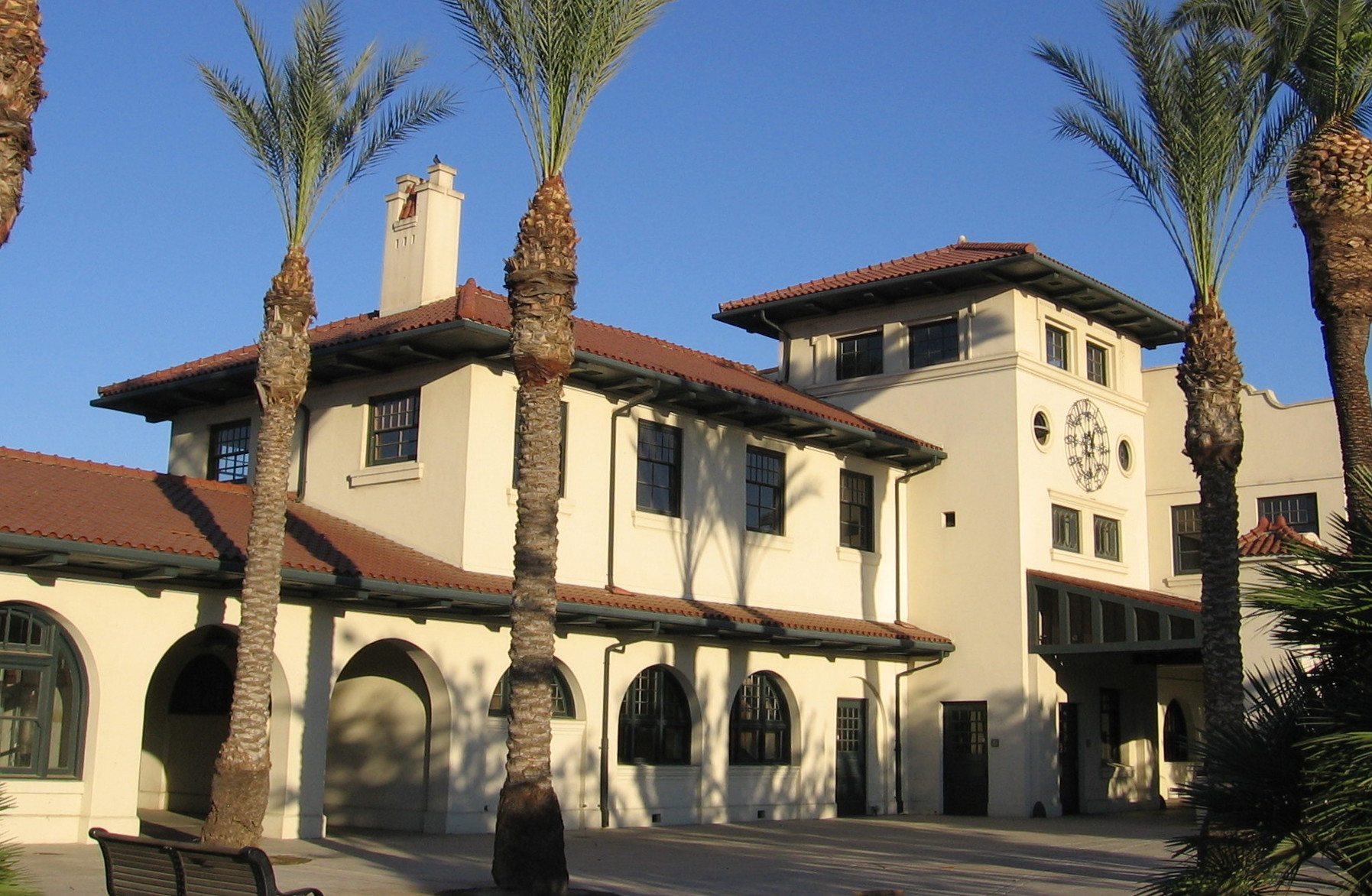
- Fresno skyline Fresno Bee Building Fulton Mall Warnors Theatre Santa Fe Depot

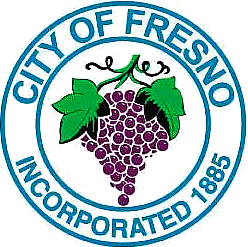
- Flag Seal
- Interactive map of Fresno
- Location within California Location within the United States
- Coordinates: 36°45′N 119°46′W
- Country: United States
- State: California
- Region: San Joaquin Valley
- County: Fresno
- Railway station: May 1872
- Incorporated: October 21, 1885
- Named for: Spanish for "ash tree"

Government
  - Type: Strong Mayor
  - Mayor: Jerry Dyer (R)
  - City manager: Georgeanne White

Area
  - City: 116.00 sq mi (300.43 km^{2})
  - Land: 114.79 sq mi (297.30 km^{2})
  - Water: 1.21 sq mi (3.13 km^{2}) 1.04%
- Elevation: 308 ft (94 m)

Population (2020)
  - City: 542,107
  - Estimate (2025): 555,549 ▲
  - Rank: 89th in North America; 34th in the United States; 5th in California
  - Density: 4,722.7/sq mi (1,823.43/km^{2})
  - Urban: 717,589 (US: 61st)
  - Urban density: 4,510/sq mi (1,741.3/km^{2})
  - Metro: 1,164,909 (49th)
- Demonym: Fresnan

GDP (Nominal, 2023)
  - Metro: $60.151 billion
- Time zone: UTC−08:00 (Pacific)
  - Summer (DST): UTC−07:00 (PDT)
- ZIP Codes: 93650, 93701–93712, 93714–93718, 93720–93730, 93737, 93740, 93741, 93744, 93745, 93747, 93750, 93755, 93760, 93761, 93764, 93765, 93771–93779, 93786, 93790–93794, 93844, 93888
- Area code: 559
- FIPS code: 06-27000
- GNIS feature IDs: 277606, 2410546
- Website: fresno.gov

Fresno (/ˈfrɛz.noʊ/; Spanish for 'ash tree') is a city in the San Joaquin Valley of California, United States. It is the county seat of Fresno County and the largest city in the greater Central Valley region, as well as the most populated city in Central California. It covers about 114.7 square miles (297 km^{2}) and had a population of 542,107 as of the 2020 census, making it the fifth-most populous city in California, the most populous inland city in California, and the 33rd-most populous city in the nation.

Named for the abundant ash trees lining the San Joaquin River, Fresno was founded in 1872 as a railway station of the Central Pacific Railroad before it was incorporated in 1885. It has since become an economic hub of Fresno County and the San Joaquin Valley, with much of the surrounding areas in the Metropolitan Fresno region predominantly tied to large-scale agricultural production. Fresno is near the geographic center of California, approximately 220 miles (350 km) north of Los Angeles, 170 miles (270 km) south of the state capital, Sacramento, and 185 miles (300 km) southeast of San Francisco. Yosemite National Park is about 60 miles (100 km) to the north, Kings Canyon National Park 60 miles (100 km) to the east, and Sequoia National Park 75 miles (120 km) to the southeast.

Fresno is also the third-largest majority-Hispanic city in the United States with 50.9% of its population being Hispanic in 2024.

== History ==
The original inhabitants of the San Joaquin Valley region were the Yokuts people and Miwok people, who engaged in trading with other Californian tribes of Native Americans including coastal peoples such as the Chumash of the Central California coast, with whom they are thought to have traded plant and animal products.

The first European to enter the San Joaquin Valley was Pedro Fages in 1772. The county of Fresno was formed in 1856 after the California Gold Rush and was named for the abundant ash trees (Spanish: fresno) lining the San Joaquin River.

The San Joaquin River flooded on December 24, 1867, inundating Millerton. Some residents rebuilt, others moved. Flooding also destroyed the town of Scottsburg on the nearby Kings River that winter. Rebuilt on higher ground, Scottsburg was renamed Centerville.

In 1867, Anthony Easterby purchased land bounded by the present Chestnut, Belmont, Clovis and California avenues, that today is called the Sunnyside district. Unable to grow wheat for lack of water, he hired sheep man Moses Church in 1870 to create an irrigation system. Building new canals and purchasing existing ditches, Church then formed the Fresno Canal and Irrigation Company, a predecessor of the Fresno Irrigation District.

In 1872, the Central Pacific Railroad established a station near Easterby's—by now a hugely productive wheat farm—for its new Southern Pacific line. Soon there was a store near the station and the store grew into the town of Fresno Station, later called Fresno. At that time, Mariposa street was the main artery, a rough dusty or muddy depression. Many Millerton residents, drawn by the convenience of the railroad and worried about flooding, moved to the new community. Fresno became an incorporated city in 1885. In 1903, the faltering San Joaquin Power Company was renamed the San Joaquin Light and Power Corporation and included the Fresno City Water Company and the Fresno City Railway. By 1931 the railway, now known as the Fresno Traction Company, operated 47 streetcars over 49 miles (79 km) of track.

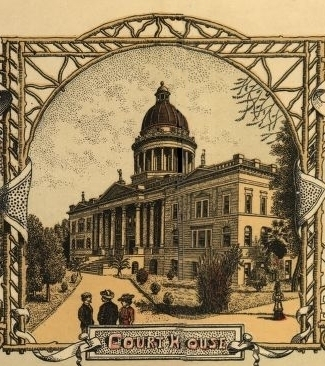
The old Fresno County Courthouse, built in 1875 and demolished in 1966

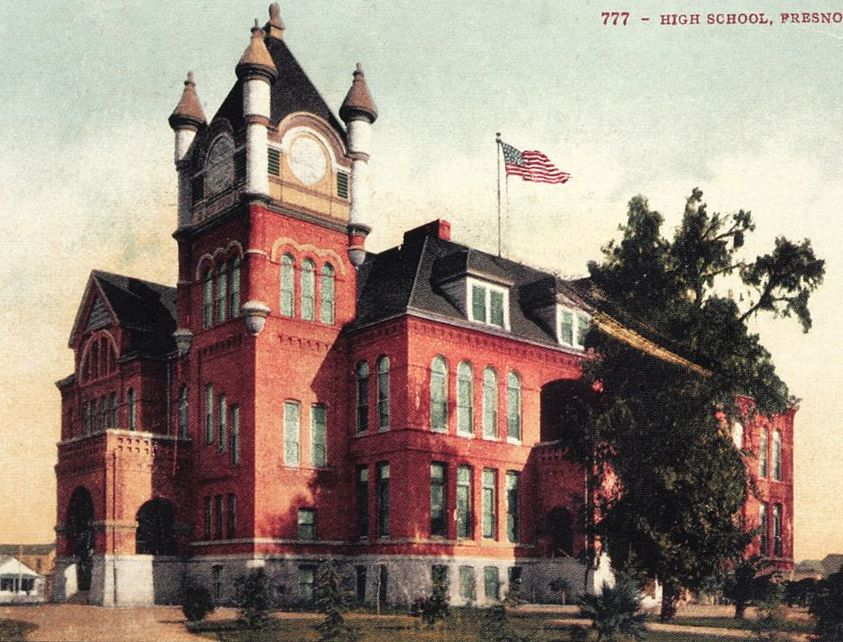
Fresno High School in 1896

Two years after the station was established, county residents voted to move the county seat from Millerton to Fresno. When the Friant Dam was completed in 1944, the site of Millerton became inundated by the waters of Millerton Lake. In extreme droughts, when the reservoir shrinks, ruins of the original county seat can still be observed.

In the nineteenth century, with so much wooden construction and in the absence of sophisticated firefighting resources, fires often ravaged American frontier towns. The greatest of Fresno's early-day fires, in 1882, destroyed an entire block of the city. Another devastating blaze struck in 1883.

In 1915, Kogetsu-Do first opened; as of 2025 it is the second oldest Japanese confectionary store in California. In 1919, Fresno's first and oldest synagogue, Temple Beth Israel, was founded.

As a result of its remoteness from the great universities of the San Francisco Bay Area and Greater Los Angeles, Fresno became a statewide leader in educational innovation. In 1910, Fresno High School was the first California high school to take advantage of the Upward Extension Act of 1907 to offer lower-division college-level coursework to local high school graduates who wanted to attend college but were reluctant to move hundreds of miles away to do so. The high school's Collegiate Department evolved into Fresno City College, the oldest community college in California and the second oldest in the United States. In the 1920s and 1930s, Fresno State Teachers College was at the forefront of the evolution of the state teachers colleges into state colleges offering a broad liberal arts education. The state colleges later became the California State University and Fresno State became California State University, Fresno.

Fresno entered the ranks of the 100 most populous cities in the United States in 1960 with a population of 134,000. Thirty years later, in the 1990 census, it moved up to 47th place with 354,000, and in the census of 2000, it achieved 37th place with 428,000.

The Fresno Municipal Sanitary Landfill was the first modern landfill in the United States, and incorporated several important innovations to waste disposal, including trenching, compacting, and the daily covering of trash with dirt. It was opened in 1937 and closed in 1987. It is a National Historic Landmark as well as a Superfund site.

Before World War II, Fresno had many ethnic neighborhoods, including Little Armenia, German Town, Little Italy, and Chinatown. In 1940, the Census Bureau reported Fresno's population as 94.0% white, 3.3% black and 2.7% Asian. Chinatown was primarily a Japanese neighborhood and today few Japanese-American businesses remain. During 1942, Pinedale, in what is now North Fresno, was the site of the Pinedale Assembly Center, an interim facility for the relocation of Fresno area Japanese Americans to internment camps. The Fresno Fairgrounds were also utilized as an assembly center.

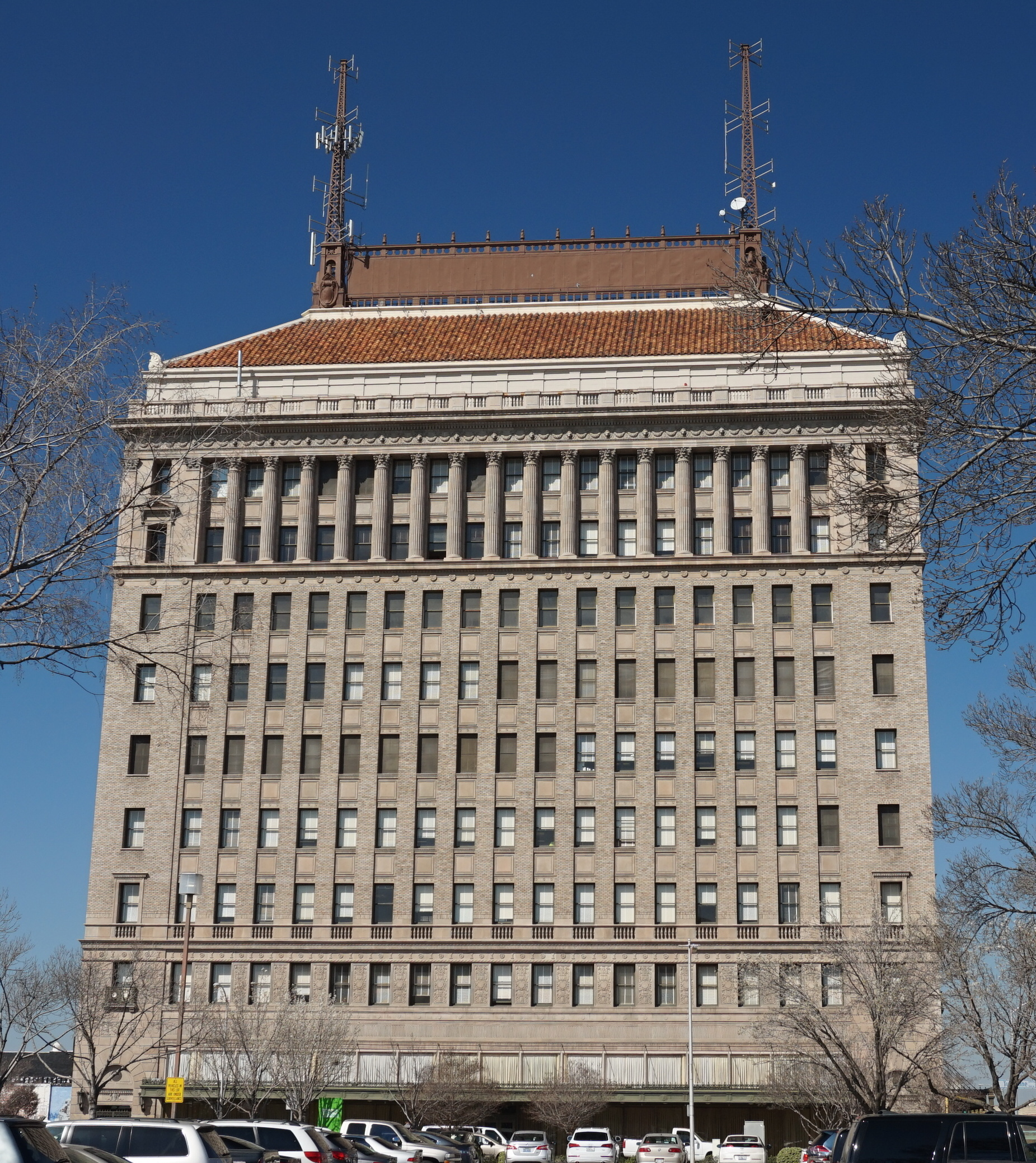
The San Joaquin Light and Power Corporation Building, built in 1923

Row crops and orchards gave way to urban development particularly in the period after World War II; this transition was particularly vividly demonstrated in locations such as the Blackstone Avenue corridor.

Fresno's geographical remoteness also made it an early pioneer in the field now known as fintech, long before the term was invented. In September 1958, Bank of America launched a new product called BankAmericard in Fresno. The city was specifically selected in part for its remoteness, to limit damage to the bank's image in case the project failed. After a troubled gestation during which its creator resigned, BankAmericard went on to become the world's first successful credit card. This financial instrument was usable across a large number of merchants and also allowed cardholders to revolve a balance (earlier financial products could do one or the other but not both). In 1970, BankAmericard was spun off into a separate company, and in 1976, that company became Visa Inc.

In the 1960s, Fresno suffered numerous demolitions of historic buildings, including the old Fresno County Courthouse and the original buildings of Edison High School. This was the result of car-centric urban planning focused on making more room for cars and parking lots, a commonplace approach in the United States at that time.

The dance style commonly known as popping evolved in Fresno in the 1970s.

In 1995, the Federal Bureau of Investigation's Operation Rezone sting resulted in several prominent Fresno and Clovis politicians being charged in connection with taking bribes in return for rezoning farmland for housing developments. Before the sting brought a halt to it, housing developers could buy farmland cheaply, pay off council members to have it rezoned, and make a large profit building and selling inexpensive housing. Sixteen people were eventually convicted as a result of the sting.

In the early 2000s, Fresno's two major venues were built, Chukchansi Park (2002) and Save Mart Center (2003). The 2017 Fresno shootings resulted in the death of four people.

== Geography ==
Fresno has a total area of 116 square miles (300 km^{2}) with 98.96% land covering 114.79 square miles (297.3 km^{2}), and 1.04% water, 1.21 square miles (3.1 km^{2}).

Fresno's location, very near the geographical center of California, places the city a comfortable distance from many of the major recreation areas and urban centers in the state. Just 60 mi (97 km) south of Yosemite National Park, it is the nearest major city to the park. Likewise, Sierra National Forest is 40 mi (64 km), Kings Canyon National Park is 60 mi (97 km) and Sequoia National Park is 75 mi (121 km). The city is located near several Sierra Nevada lakes including Bass Lake, Shaver Lake, and Huntington Lake. Fresno is also only two and a half hours from Monterey, Carmel, Big Sur and the central coast.

Because Fresno sits at the junction of Highways 41 and 99 (SR 41 is Yosemite National Park's southern access road, and SR 99 bypasses Interstate 5 to serve the urban centers of the San Joaquin Valley), the city is a major gateway for Yosemite visitors coming from Los Angeles. The city also serves as an entrance into Sierra National Forest via Highway 168, and Sequoia and Kings Canyon National Parks via Highway 180.

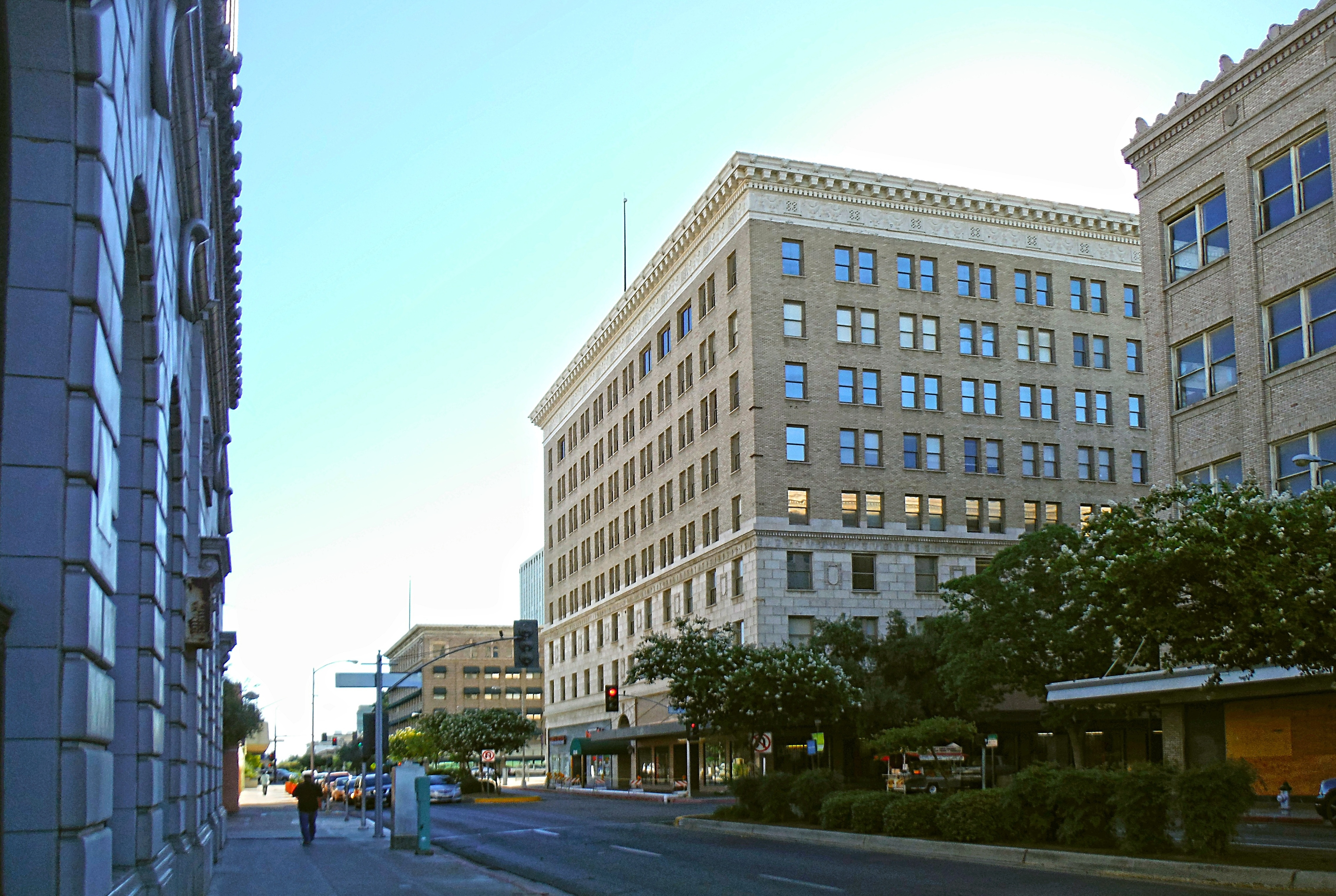
Tulare Street in Downtown Fresno

Fresno has three large public parks, two in the city limits and one in county land to the southwest. Woodward Park, which features the Shinzen Japanese Gardens, boasts numerous picnic areas and several miles of trails. It is in North Fresno and is adjacent to the San Joaquin River Parkway. Roeding Park, near Downtown Fresno, is home to the Fresno Chaffee Zoo, and Rotary Storyland and Playland. Kearney Park is the largest of the Fresno region's park system and is home to historic Kearney Mansion and plays host to the annual Civil War Revisited, the largest reenactment of the Civil War in the west coast of the U.S.

In its 2023 ParkScore ranking, The Trust for Public Land, a national land conservation organization, reported that Fresno had one of the worst park systems among the 100 most populous U.S. cities, with only 5% of city land being used for parks and recreation. The survey measures median park size, park acres as percent of city area, residents' access to parks, spending on parks per resident, and playgrounds per 10,000 residents.

=== Neighborhoods ===
==== Downtown ====
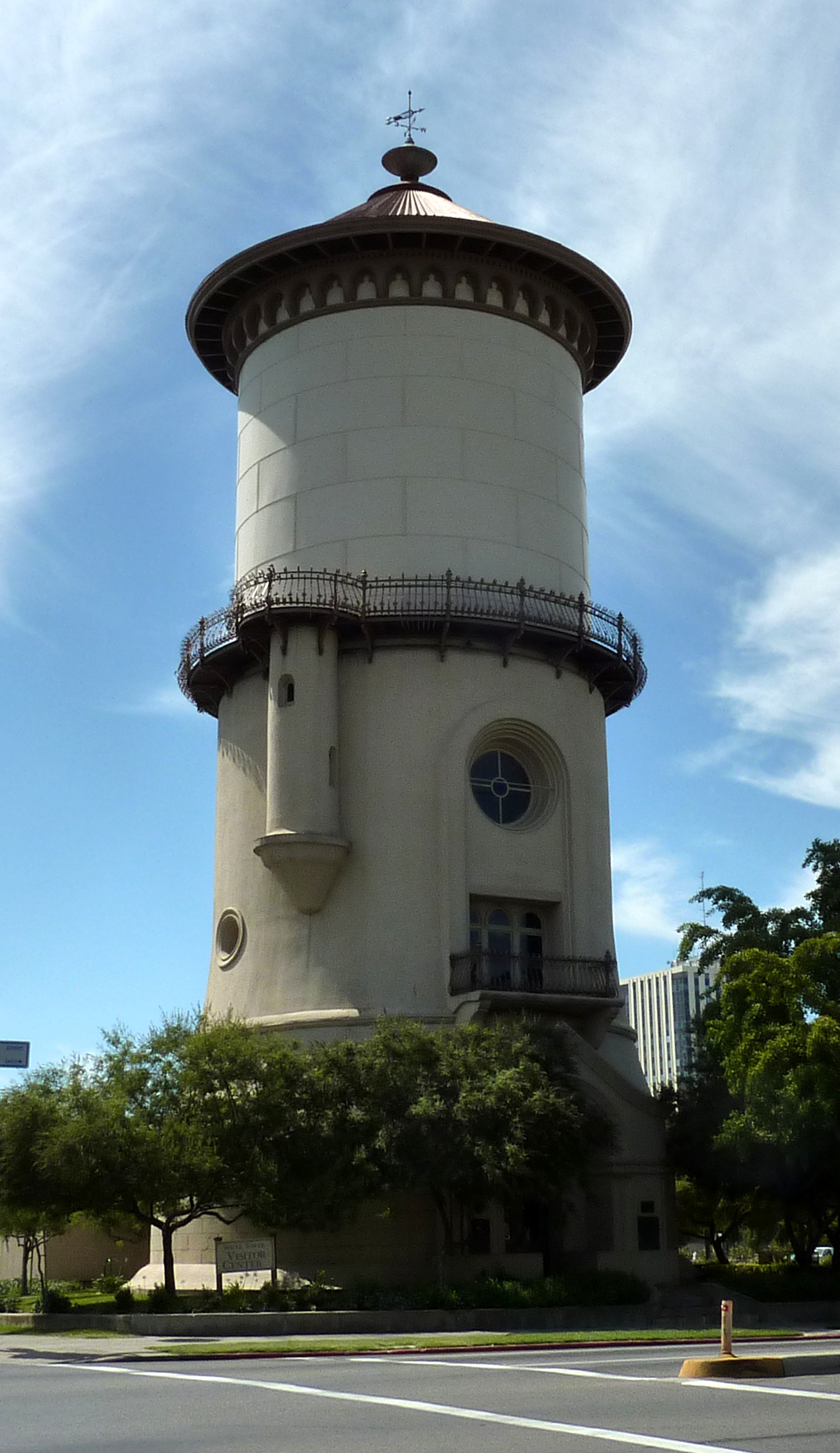
The Old Fresno Water Tower, built in 1894 and designed by George W. Maher, is one of Fresno's oldest landmarks.

The Central Pacific Railroad built a small wooden depot in 1872. In 1889, the Southern Pacific Railroad, which had acquired Central Pacific, constructed a new depot on the original depot site. The brick Queen Anne style depot was a jewel for the city and is one of Fresno's oldest standing buildings. In 1971, 99 years after it first opened for business on its current site, the Depot closed its rail operations due to the decline in business.

Between the 1880s and World War II, Downtown Fresno flourished, filled with electric streetcars, and contained a number of "lavish" and "opulent" buildings. Among them, the original Fresno County Courthouse (demolished), the Fresno Carnegie Public Library (demolished), the Old Fresno Water Tower, the Bank of Italy Building, the Pacific Southwest Building, the San Joaquin Light and Power Building (currently known as the Grand 1401), and the Hughes Hotel (burned down), to name a few.

Fulton Street in Downtown Fresno was Fresno's main financial and commercial district before being converted into one of the nation's first pedestrian malls in 1964. Renamed the Fulton Mall, the area contains the densest collection of historic buildings in Fresno. While the Fulton Mall corridor has suffered a sharp decline from its heyday, the Mall includes some of the finest public art pieces in the country, including a casting of Pierre-Auguste Renoir's bronze "The Washer Woman", reportedly the only one of the six castings that one can walk up to and touch. In October 2017, the City of Fresno finished and opened Fulton Mall to traffic, becoming Fulton Street. This change was celebrated with a large public parade featuring current mayor Lee Brand and former mayor Ashley Swearengin. The public art pieces will be restored and placed near their current locations and will feature wide sidewalks (up to 28' on the east side of the street) to continue with the pedestrian-friendly environment of the district.

==== Tower District ====
The historic Tower Theatre, which is included on the National Register of Historic Places, is the center of the Tower District. The theater was built in 1939 at the corner of Olive and Wishon Avenues. The Tower District neighborhood is just north of downtown Fresno proper, and one-half mile south of Fresno City College. Although the neighborhood was known as a residential area, the early commercial establishments of the Tower District began with small shops and services that flocked to the area shortly after World War II. The character of small local businesses largely remains today. To some extent, the businesses of the Tower District were developed due to the proximity of the original Fresno Normal School (later renamed California State University at Fresno). In 1916, the college moved to what is now the site of Fresno City College one-half mile north of the Tower District.

After decades of neglect and suburban flight, the neighborhood revival followed the re-opening of the Tower Theatre in the late 1970s, which at that time showed second- and third-run movies, along with classic films. Roger Rocka's Dinner Theater & Good Company Players also opened nearby in 1978, at Olive and Wishon Avenues. Fresno native Audra McDonald performed in the leading roles of Evita and The Wiz at the theater while she was a high school student. McDonald subsequently became a leading performer on Broadway in New York City and a Tony award-winning actress. Also in the Tower District is Good Company Players' 2nd Space Theatre.

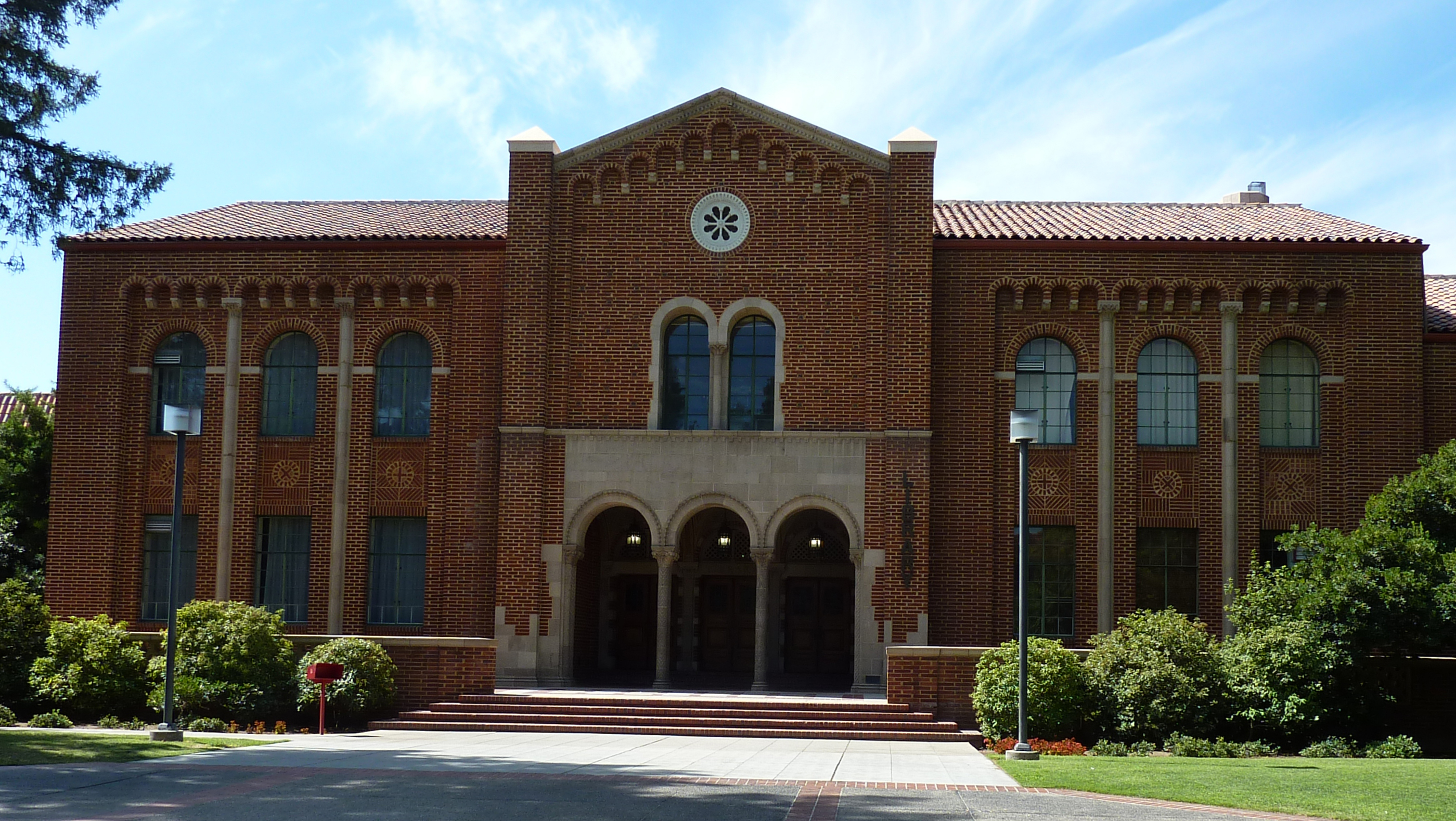
The main library at City College was built in 1933.

The Tower District is a hub for community events such as Jamaica My Weekend, Mardi Gras in February, Gay Pride Parade, car shows, A Taste of The Tower, Halloween in the Tower, the Farmers' market opened on the northwest corner of Olive and Van Ness and LitHop, an annual literary festival, featuring mostly local writers.

The neighborhood features restaurants, live theater and nightclubs, as well as several independent shops and bookstores on or near Olive Avenue. Since renewal, the Tower District has become an attractive area for restaurant and other local businesses. The Tower District is known as the center of Fresno's LGBT and hipster communities.

The area is also known for its early twentieth century homes, many of which have been restored in recent decades. The area includes many California Bungalow and American Craftsman style homes, Spanish Colonial Revival Style architecture, Mediterranean Revival Style architecture, Mission Revival Style architecture, and many Storybook houses designed by Fresno architects, Hilliard, Taylor & Wheeler. The residential architecture of the Tower District contrasts with the newer areas of tract homes urban sprawl in north and east areas of Fresno.

==== Woodward Park ====
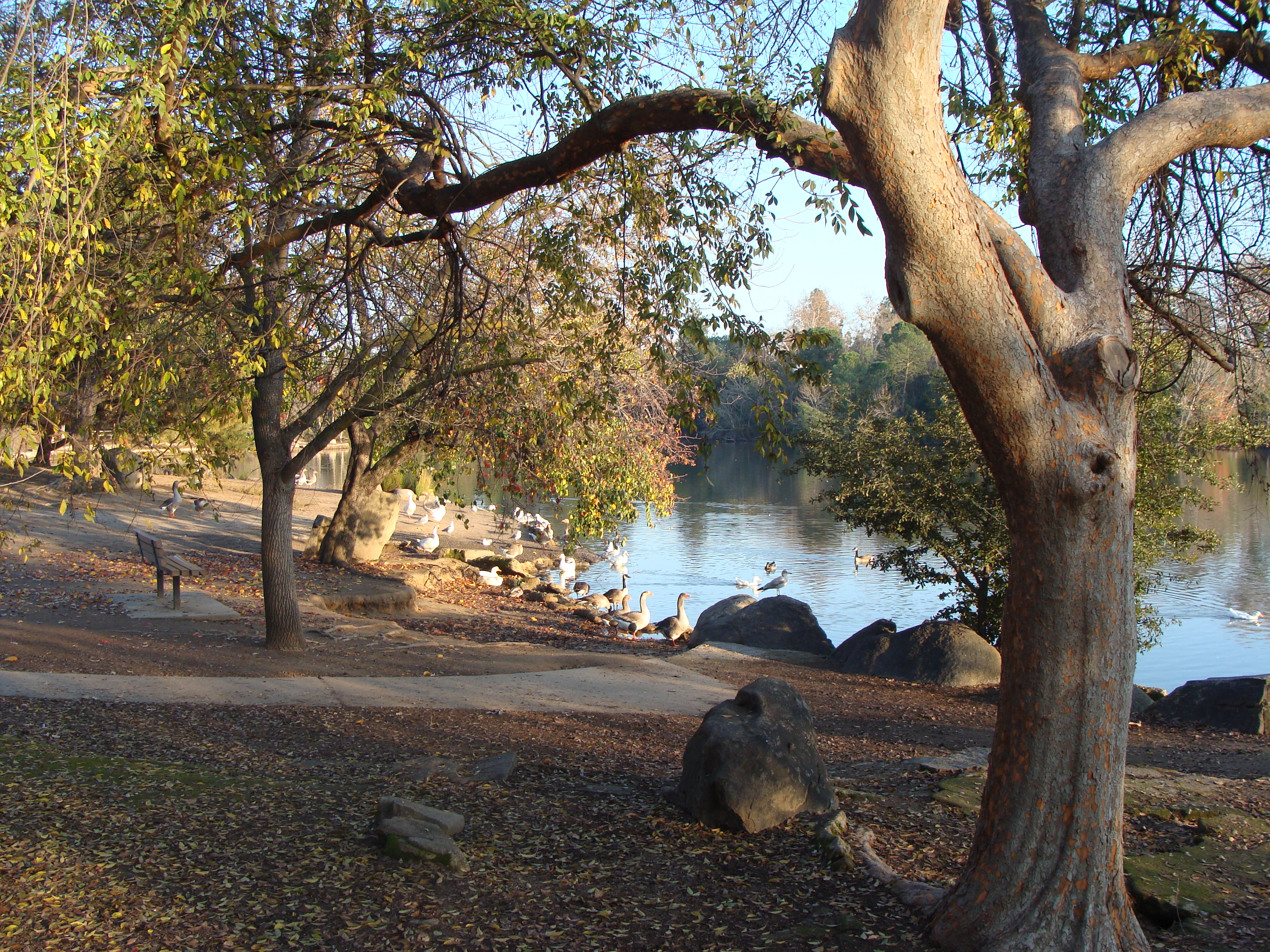
Woodward Park

In the northeastern part of Fresno, Woodward Park was founded by the late Ralph Woodward, a long-time Fresno resident. He bequeathed a major portion of his estate in 1968 to provide a regional park and bird sanctuary in Northeast Fresno. The park lies on the southern bank of the San Joaquin River between Highway 41 and Friant Road. The initial 235 acres (0.95 km^{2}), combined with additional acres acquired later by the city, brings the park to a sizable 300 acres (1.2 km^{2}). Now packed with amenities, Woodward Park is the only Regional Park of its size in the Central Valley. The park has a multi-use amphitheatre that seats up to 2,500 people, an authentic Japanese Garden, fenced dog park, bike park, two playgrounds, two-mile (3 km) equestrian trail, exercise par course, three children's playgrounds, a lake, three small ponds, seven picnic areas, and five miles (8 km) of multipurpose trails that are part of the San Joaquin River Parkway's Lewis S. Eaton Trail. When complete, the Lewis S. Eaton trail system will cover 22 miles (35 km) between Highway 99 and Friant Dam. The park's amphitheatre was renovated in 2010, and has hosted performances by acts such as Deftones, Tech N9ne, and Sevendust as well as numerous others. Woodward Park hosts the annual California Interscholastic Federation State Championship cross country meet. It is the home of the Woodward Shakespeare Festival which began performances in the park in 2005.

==== Fig Garden ====
Located in the western portion of Fresno, Old Fig Garden is an unincorporated community that, over time, has been completely encircled by the city of Fresno. Fig Garden was created in 1947, as the then-known Fig Garden Men's club achieved nonprofit corporate status, allowing itself to have much more governance.

In 1979, the name was changed to Fig Garden Home Owners Association. Fig Garden is unique to the rest of Fresno, as it features largely no sidewalks and is lined with various large trees. The homes are well-maintained and landscaped due to strict regulations from the homeowners association. Due to a tax Fig Garden residents voted for, there is nearly round-the-clock sheriff service within the district. The district hosts the Fig Garden Christmas Tree Lane, which is a nationally recognized event. There is also an upscale swim and racquet club located in northwestern Fig garden, which has multiple amenities including a heated lap pool, massage therapy, daycare, etc. Towards the northern boundary there is a shopping center called Fig Garden Village which hosts a plethora of upscale shopping opportunities.

=== Climate ===
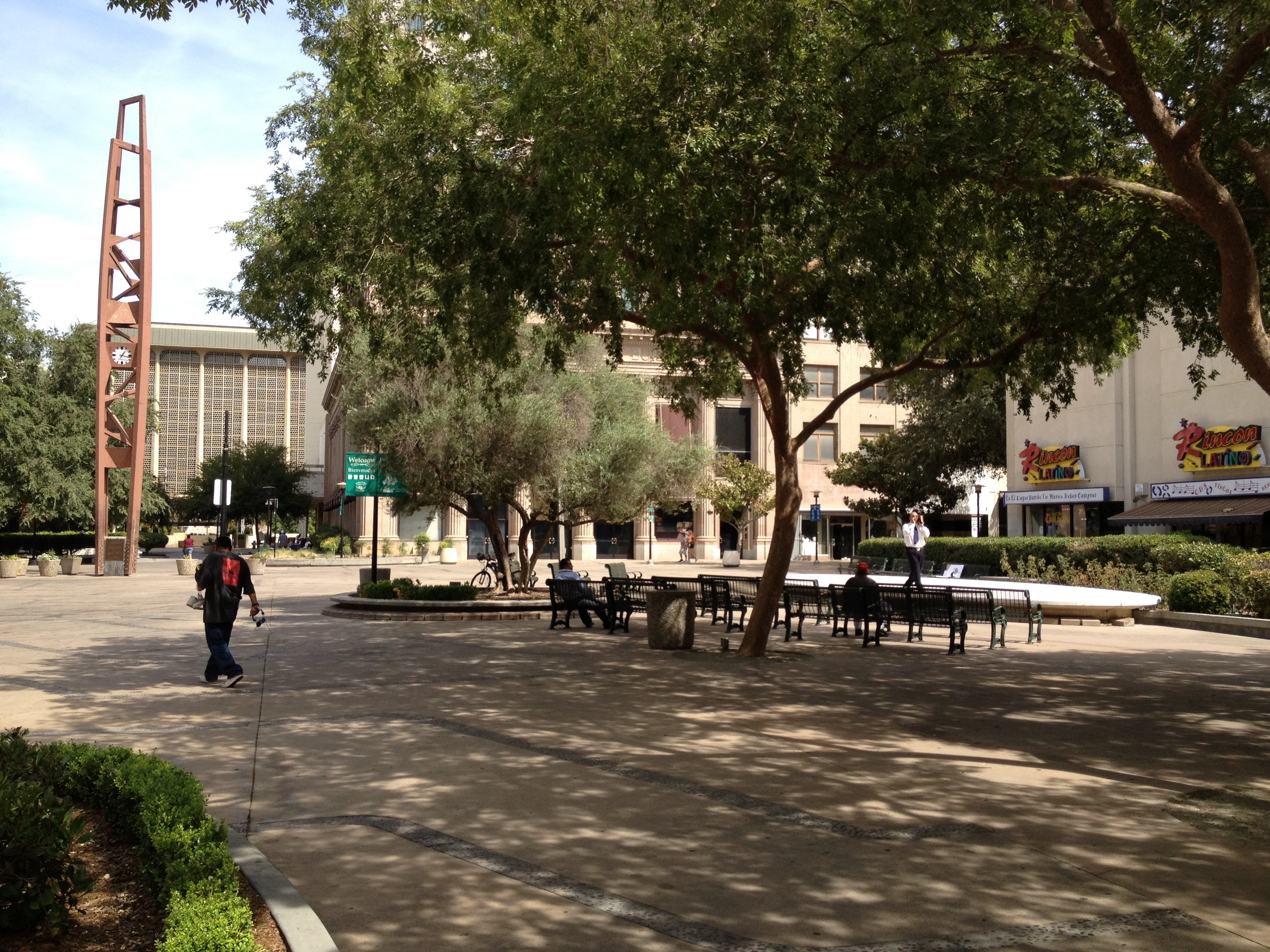
Mariposa Plaza in downtown

Fresno has a semi-arid climate (Köppen climate classification BSh, bordering BSk), with cool, mild winters and long, hot, dry summers. December and January are the coldest months, averaging 47.5 °F (8.6 °C) and 48.0 °F (8.9 °C), respectively; mornings sporadically see temperatures at or below freezing, with the coldest night of the year typically bottoming out around 29 °F (−1.7 °C). July is the warmest month, averaging 83.5 °F (28.6 °C); normally, there are 38 days of 100 °F (37.8 °C)+ highs and 113 days of 90 °F (32.2 °C)+ highs, and between July and August, there are only 3.6 days where the high does not reach 90 °F (32.2 °C). Summers provide considerable sunshine, with July exceeding 96 percent of the total possible sunlight hours; conversely, December is the lowest with only 42 percent of the daylight time in sunlight because of tule fog. However, the year averages 81% of possible sunshine, for a total of 3550 hours. Average annual precipitation is around 11 inches (279 mm). Most of the wind rose direction occurrences derive from the northwest, as winds are driven downward along the axis of the California Central Valley; in December, January and February there is an increased presence of southeastern wind directions in the wind rose statistics. Fresno meteorology was selected in a national U.S. Environmental Protection Agency study for analysis of equilibrium temperature for use of ten-year meteorological data to represent a warm, dry western United States locale.

Climate chart for Fresno

The official record high temperature for Fresno is 115 °F (46.1 °C), set on July 8, 1905, while the official record low is 17 °F (−8 °C), set on January 6, 1913. The average windows for temperatures of 100 °F (37.8 °C)+ are June 2 through September 15; for temperatures of 90 °F (32.2 °C)+, April 25 through October 10; and for freezing temperatures, December 14 through January 24, although no freeze occurred during the 1983–84 or 2020–21 winter seasons. Annual rainfall has ranged from 23.57 inches (598.7 mm) in the "rain year" from July 1982 to June 1983 down to 4.43 inches (112.5 mm) from July 1933 to June 1934. The most rainfall in one month was 9.54 inches (242.3 mm) in November 1885 and the most rainfall in 24 hours was 3.55 inches (90.2 mm) on November 18, 1885. Measurable precipitation falls on an average of 46.5 days annually. Snow is a rarity; the heaviest snowfall at the airport was 2.2 inches (5.6 cm) on January 21–22, 1962.

Climate data for Fresno, California (Fresno Airport), 1991–2020 normals, (Note: Mean maxima and minima (i.e., the highest and lowest temperature readings during an entire month or year) calculated based on data at said location from 1991 to 2020.) extremes 1881–present (Note: Official records for Fresno kept September 1881 to 15 August 1887 at downtown, 16 August 1887 to June 1939 at Fresno City Offices, July 1939 to 20 August 1949 at Chandler Field, and at Fresno Yosemite Int'l since 21 August 1949. For more information, see Threadex)
| Month | Jan | Feb | Mar | Apr | May | Jun | Jul | Aug | Sep | Oct | Nov | Dec | Year |
|---|---|---|---|---|---|---|---|---|---|---|---|---|---|
| Record high °F (°C) | 78 (26) | 84 (29) | 93 (34) | 101 (38) | 110 (43) | 112 (44) | 115 (46) | 113 (45) | 114 (46) | 105 (41) | 90 (32) | 77 (25) | 115 (46) |
| Mean maximum °F (°C) | 68.1 (20.1) | 73.7 (23.2) | 81.9 (27.7) | 90.8 (32.7) | 99.0 (37.2) | 105.9 (41.1) | 107.7 (42.1) | 107.1 (41.7) | 103.1 (39.5) | 93.2 (34.0) | 79.6 (26.4) | 67.4 (19.7) | 109.2 (42.9) |
| Mean daily maximum °F (°C) | 55.4 (13.0) | 61.3 (16.3) | 67.5 (19.7) | 73.7 (23.2) | 82.7 (28.2) | 91.4 (33.0) | 97.7 (36.5) | 96.5 (35.8) | 90.7 (32.6) | 78.7 (25.9) | 64.9 (18.3) | 55.3 (12.9) | 76.3 (24.6) |
| Daily mean °F (°C) | 48.0 (8.9) | 52.3 (11.3) | 57.4 (14.1) | 62.3 (16.8) | 70.2 (21.2) | 77.6 (25.3) | 83.5 (28.6) | 82.2 (27.9) | 77.1 (25.1) | 66.7 (19.3) | 55.1 (12.8) | 47.5 (8.6) | 65.0 (18.3) |
| Mean daily minimum °F (°C) | 40.6 (4.8) | 43.3 (6.3) | 47.3 (8.5) | 50.9 (10.5) | 57.6 (14.2) | 63.9 (17.7) | 69.3 (20.7) | 67.9 (19.9) | 63.4 (17.4) | 54.6 (12.6) | 45.4 (7.4) | 39.8 (4.3) | 53.7 (12.1) |
| Mean minimum °F (°C) | 30.5 (−0.8) | 33.4 (0.8) | 37.2 (2.9) | 40.4 (4.7) | 47.7 (8.7) | 52.9 (11.6) | 60.1 (15.6) | 59.7 (15.4) | 53.8 (12.1) | 44.6 (7.0) | 34.7 (1.5) | 30.2 (−1.0) | 28.8 (−1.8) |
| Record low °F (°C) | 17 (−8) | 24 (−4) | 26 (−3) | 32 (0) | 36 (2) | 42 (6) | 50 (10) | 49 (9) | 37 (3) | 27 (−3) | 26 (−3) | 18 (−8) | 17 (−8) |
| Average precipitation inches (mm) | 2.16 (55) | 1.93 (49) | 1.90 (48) | 1.04 (26) | 0.42 (11) | 0.24 (6.1) | 0.03 (0.76) | 0.00 (0.00) | 0.05 (1.3) | 0.56 (14) | 0.87 (22) | 1.79 (45) | 10.99 (279) |
| Average precipitation days (≥ 0.01 in) | 7.7 | 8.5 | 7.2 | 4.5 | 2.7 | 0.7 | 0.3 | 0.1 | 0.6 | 2.2 | 4.7 | 7.3 | 46.5 |
| Average relative humidity (%) | 83.3 | 77.2 | 68.9 | 57.4 | 47.3 | 41.9 | 39.2 | 44.7 | 50.0 | 58.5 | 74.1 | 84.2 | 60.6 |
| Average dew point °F (°C) | 39.4 (4.1) | 42.4 (5.8) | 43.2 (6.2) | 43.2 (6.2) | 45.3 (7.4) | 48.9 (9.4) | 52.3 (11.3) | 54.1 (12.3) | 51.6 (10.9) | 47.3 (8.5) | 43.2 (6.2) | 39.6 (4.2) | 45.9 (7.7) |
| Mean monthly sunshine hours | 141.5 | 196.9 | 286.2 | 335.5 | 398.9 | 412.2 | 428.2 | 399.6 | 345.9 | 302.3 | 189.9 | 127.1 | 3,564.2 |
| Percentage possible sunshine | 46 | 65 | 77 | 85 | 91 | 94 | 96 | 95 | 93 | 87 | 62 | 42 | 80 |
Source: NOAA (relative humidity, dew points and sun 1961–1990)

== Demographics ==
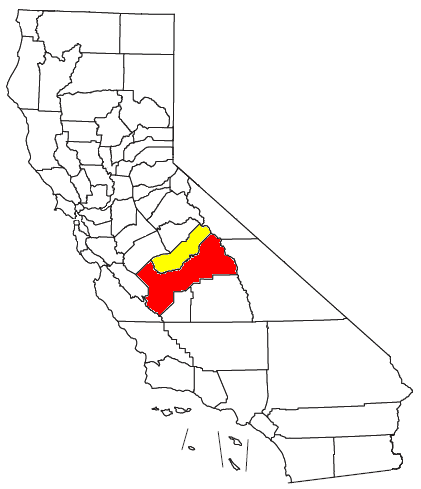
Map of Metropolitan Fresno and its components: Fresno County Madera County

Historical population
| Census | Pop. | Note | %± |
|---|---|---|---|
| 1880 | 1,112 | | — |
| 1890 | 10,818 | | 872.8% |
| 1900 | 12,470 | | 15.3% |
| 1910 | 24,892 | | 99.6% |
| 1920 | 45,086 | | 81.1% |
| 1930 | 52,513 | | 16.5% |
| 1940 | 60,685 | | 15.6% |
| 1950 | 91,669 | | 51.1% |
| 1960 | 133,929 | | 46.1% |
| 1970 | 165,655 | | 23.7% |
| 1980 | 217,491 | | 31.3% |
| 1990 | 354,202 | | 62.9% |
| 2000 | 427,652 | | 20.7% |
| 2010 | 494,665 | | 15.7% |
| 2020 | 542,107 | | 9.6% |
| 2025 (est.) | 555,549 | ▲ | 2.5% |
U.S. Decennial Census; 2010–2025

Fresno is the larger principal city of the Fresno-Madera CSA, a Combined Statistical Area that includes the Fresno (Fresno County) and Madera (Madera County) metropolitan areas, which had a combined population of 922,516 at the 2000 census.

Fresno is home to numerous ethnic minority communities, such as the Armenian and Hmong communities. In 1920, Armenians comprised 9% of the population of the city of Fresno, with 4,000 Armenian residents at the time. Old Armenian Town was the old Armenian neighborhood in the center of Fresno. The Hmong community of Fresno, along with that of Minneapolis–Saint Paul, is one of the largest two urban U.S. ethnic Hmong communities, with just over 24,000 people, or about 5% of the city's population, being of Hmong descent.

A 2023 study and poverty mapping showed the city's core as having the most highly concentrated poverty in the state of California. The divide separating the wealthy, predominantly white neighborhoods and impoverished, predominantly minority neighborhoods is mainly due to wealthier inhabitants moving to the fringes of the northern part of the city, leaving the core to suffer from abandonment and disinvestment.

| Historical racial composition | 2010 | 1990 | 1970 | 1940 |
|---|---|---|---|---|
| White | 49.6% | 59.2% | 86.7% | 94.0% |
| —Non-Hispanic | 30.0% | 49.4% | 72.6% (Note: From 15% sample) | n/a |
| Hispanic or Latino (of any race) | 46.9% | 29.9% | 16.1% | n/a |
| Black or African American | 8.3% | 8.3% | 9.6% | 3.3% |
| Asian | 12.6% | 12.5% | 2.0% | 2.7% |

Fresno, California – Racial and ethnic composition Note: the US Census treats Hispanic/Latino as an ethnic category. This table excludes Latinos from the racial categories and assigns them to a separate category. Hispanics/Latinos may be of any race.
| Race / Ethnicity (NH = Non-Hispanic) | Pop 2000 | Pop 2010 | Pop 2020 | % 2000 | % 2010 | % 2020 |
|---|---|---|---|---|---|---|
| White alone (NH) | 159,473 | 148,598 | 129,705 | 37.29% | 30.04% | 23.93% |
| Black or African American alone (NH) | 34,357 | 37,885 | 37,611 | 8.03% | 7.66% | 6.94% |
| Native American or Alaska Native alone (NH) | 3,259 | 3,127 | 3,501 | 0.76% | 0.63% | 0.65% |
| Asian alone (NH) | 47,136 | 60,939 | 77,243 | 11.02% | 12.32% | 14.25% |
| Pacific Islander alone (NH) | 427 | 663 | 766 | 0.10% | 0.13% | 0.14% |
| Other race alone (NH) | 728 | 984 | 2,918 | 0.17% | 0.20% | 0.54% |
| Mixed race or Multiracial (NH) | 11,752 | 10,414 | 16,592 | 2.75% | 2.11% | 3.06% |
| Hispanic or Latino (any race) | 170,520 | 232,055 | 273,771 | 39.87% | 46.91% | 50.50% |
| Total | 427,520 | 494,665 | 542,107 | 100.00% | 100.00% | 100.00% |

=== 2020 ===
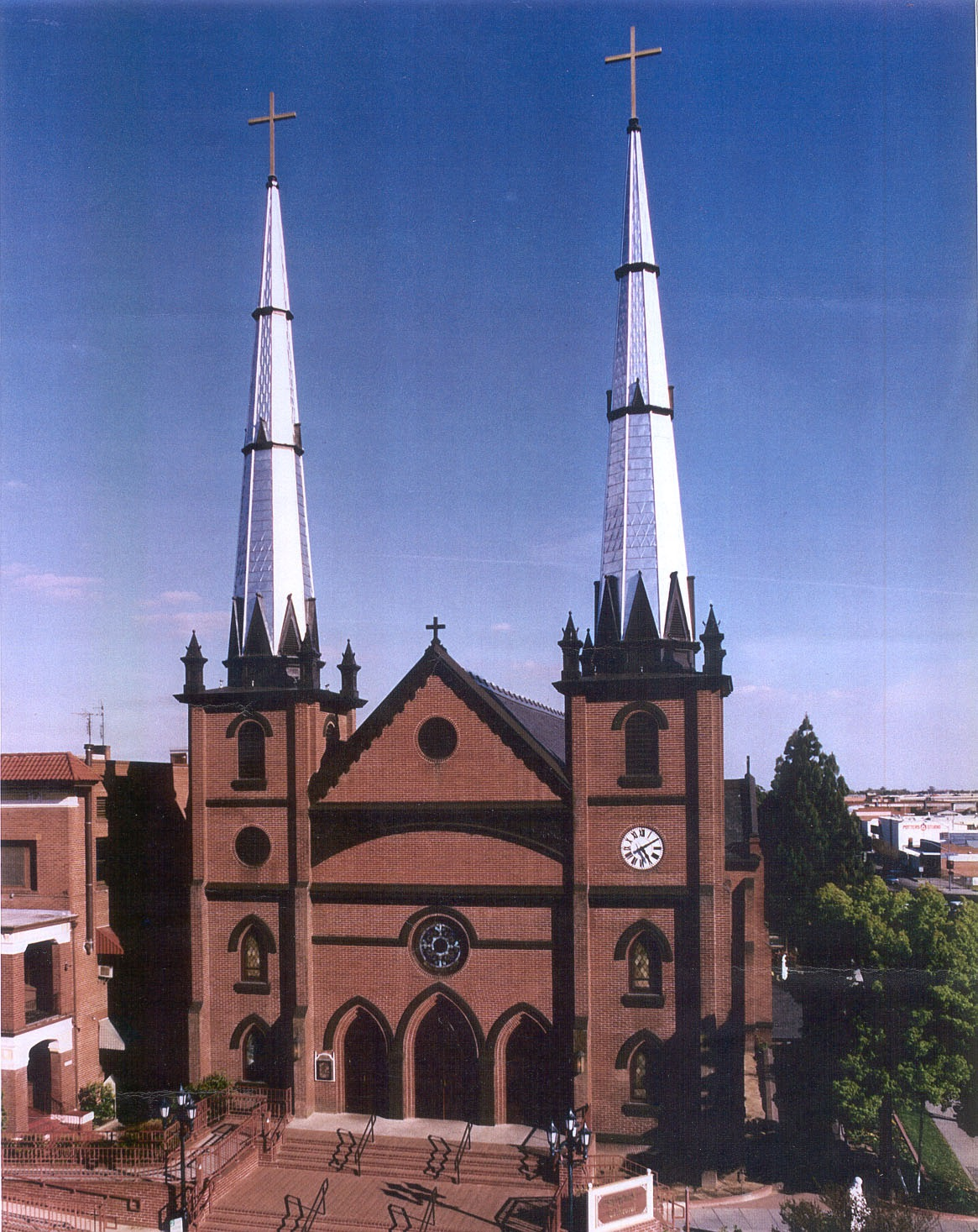
St. John the Baptist Cathedral, seat of the Catholic Diocese of Fresno

The 2020 United States census reported that Fresno had a population of 542,107. The population density was 4,706.8 inhabitants per square mile (1,817.3/km^{2}). The racial makeup of Fresno was 33.2% White, 7.6% African American, 2.4% Native American, 14.7% Asian, 0.2% Pacific Islander, 26.8% from other races, and 15.2% from two or more races. Hispanic or Latino of any race were 50.5% of the population.

The census reported that 98.1% of the population lived in households, 1.0% lived in non-institutionalized group quarters, and 0.9% were institutionalized.

There were 175,944 households, out of which 39.7% included children under the age of 18, 40.6% were married-couple households, 9.0% were cohabiting couple households, 30.8% had a female householder with no partner present, and 19.5% had a male householder with no partner present. 22.8% of households were one person, and 9.2% were one person aged 65 or older. The average household size was 3.02. There were 123,337 families (70.1% of all households).

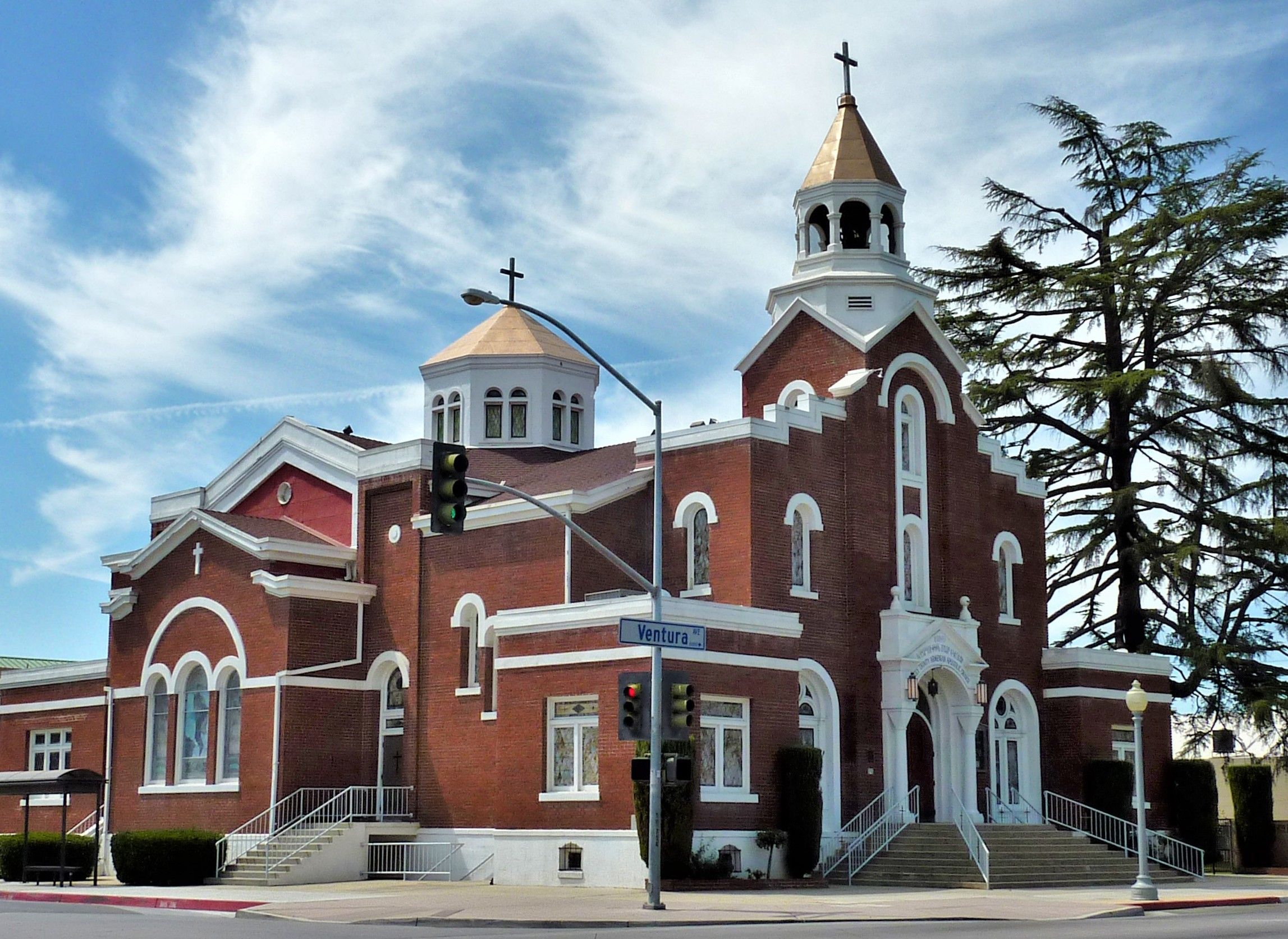
Holy Trinity Armenian Church

The age distribution was 27.7% under the age of 18, 10.5% aged 18 to 24, 28.6% aged 25 to 44, 20.7% aged 45 to 64, and 12.4% who were 65 years of age or older. The median age was 32.2 years. For every 100 females, there were 97.0 males.

There were 184,226 housing units at an average density of 1,599.5 units per square mile (617.6 units/km^{2}), of which 175,944 (95.5%) were occupied. Of these, 48.3% were owner-occupied, and 51.7% were occupied by renters.

In 2023, the US Census Bureau estimated that the median household income was $66,804, and the per capita income was $31,012. About 16.3% of families and 20.9% of the population were below the poverty line.

=== 2010 ===
The 2010 United States census reported that Fresno had a population of 494,665. The population density was 4,404.5 inhabitants per square mile (1,700.6/km^{2}). The racial makeup of Fresno was 245,306 (49.6%) White, 40,960 (8.3%) African American, 8,525 (1.7%) Native American, 62,528 (12.6%) Asian (3.6% Hmong, 1.7% Indian, 1.2% Filipino, 1.2% Laotian, 1.0% Thai, 0.8% Cambodian, 0.7% Chinese, 0.5% Japanese, 0.4% Vietnamese, 0.2% Korean), 849 (0.2%) Pacific Islander, 111,984 (22.6%) from other races, and 24,513 (5.0%) from two or more races. Hispanic or Latino of any race were 232,055 persons (46.9%). Among the Hispanic population, 42.7% of the total population are Mexican, 0.4% Salvadoran, and 0.4% Puerto Rican. Non-Hispanic Whites were 30.0% of the population in 2010, down from 72.6% in 1970.

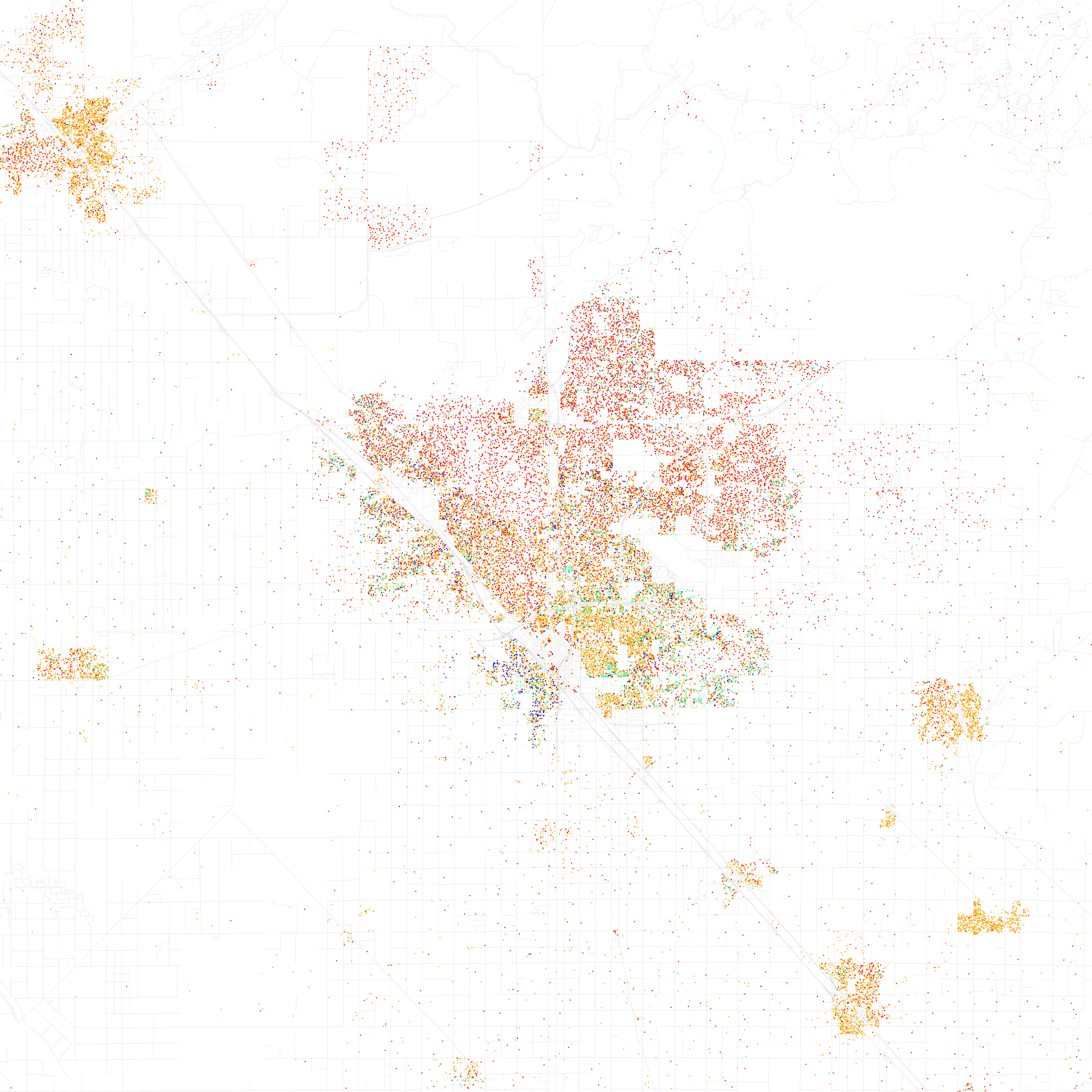
Map of racial distribution in Fresno, 2010 U.S. Census. Each dot is 25 people: ⬤ White ⬤ Black ⬤ Asian ⬤ Hispanic ⬤ Other

The Census reported that 485,798 people (98.2% of the population) lived in households, 4,315 (0.9%) lived in non-institutionalized group quarters, and 4,552 (0.9%) were institutionalized.

There were 158,349 households, of which 68,511 (43.3%) had children under the age of 18 living in them, 69,284 (43.8%) were opposite-sex married couples living together, 30,547 (19.3%) had a female householder with no husband present, 11,698 (7.4%) had a male householder with no wife present. There were 12,843 (8.1%) unmarried opposite-sex partnerships, and 1,388 (0.9%) same-sex married couples or partnerships. 35,064 households (22.1%) were made up of individuals, and 12,344 (7.8%) had someone living alone who was 65 years of age or older. The average household size was 3.07. There were 111,529 families (70.4% of all households); the average family size was 3.62.

The age distribution of the population shows 148,823 people (30.1%) under the age of 18, 62,601 people (12.7%) aged 18 to 24, 135,076 people (27.3%) aged 25 to 44, 102,064 people (20.6%) aged 45 to 64, and 46,101 people (9.3%) who were 65 years of age or older. The median age was 29.3 years. For every 100 females, there were 96.7 males. For every 100 females age 18 and over, there were 93.5 males.

There were 171,288 housing units at an average density of 1,525.2 per square mile (588.9/km^{2}), of which 158,349 were occupied, of which 77,757 (49.1%) were owner-occupied, and 80,592 (50.9%) were occupied by renters. The homeowner vacancy rate was 2.6%; the rental vacancy rate was 7.6%. 235,430 people (47.6% of the population) lived in owner-occupied housing units and 250,368 people (50.6%) lived in rental housing units.

== Economy ==
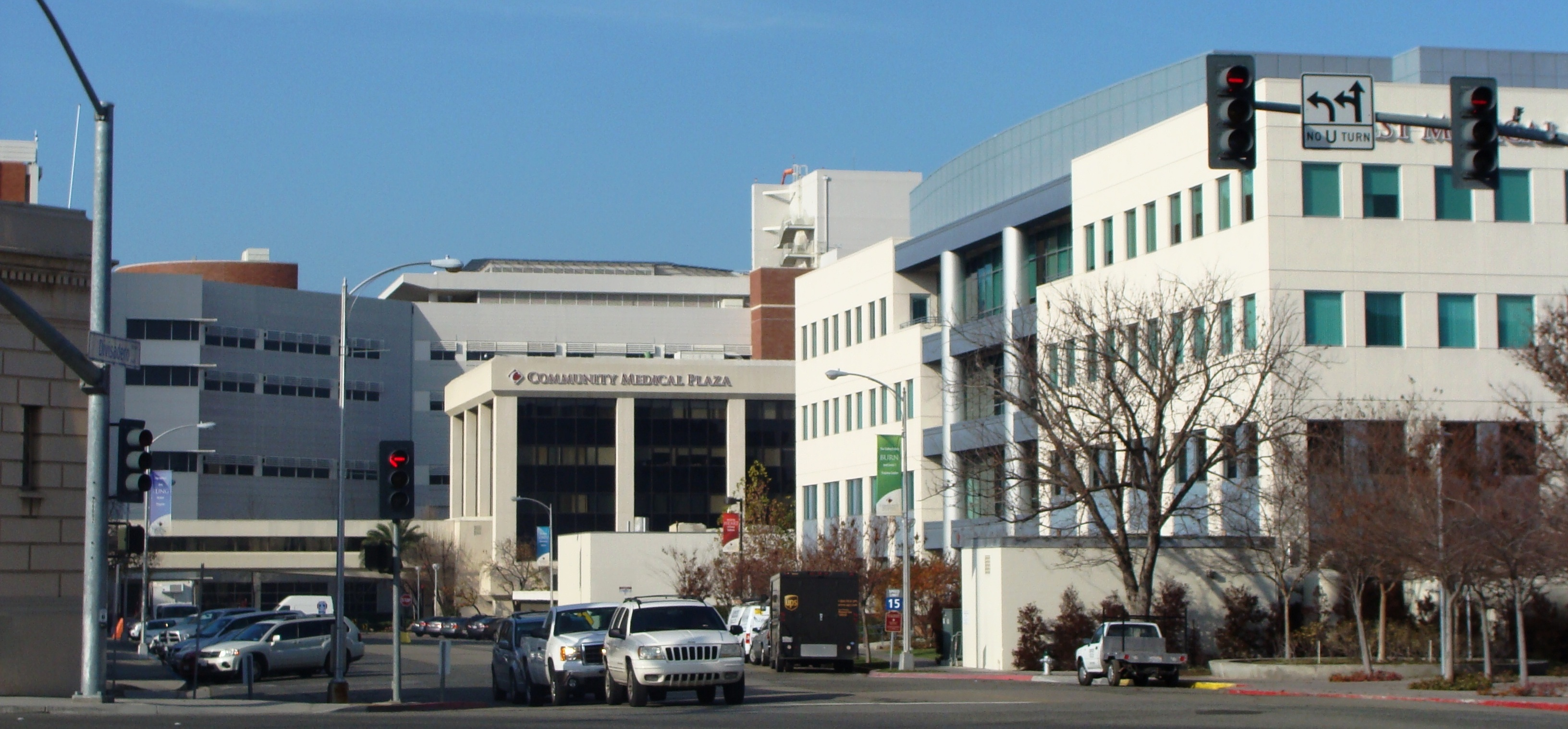
Community Regional Medical Center

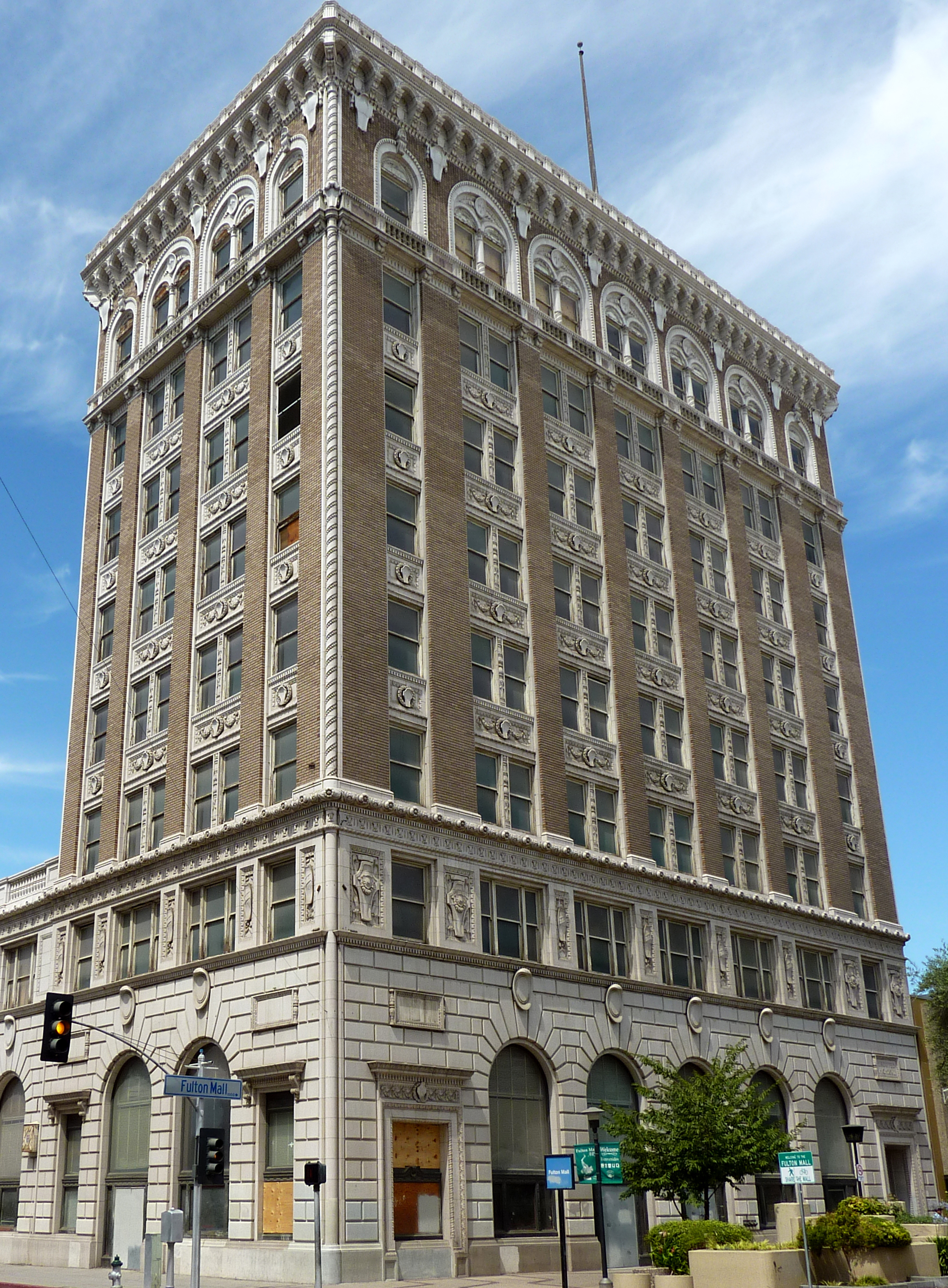
Bank of Italy Building, built in 1918

Fresno is the center of Metropolitan Fresno and serves as the regional hub for the San Joaquin Valley and the greater Central Valley region. The unincorporated area and rural cities surrounding Fresno remain predominantly tied to large-scale agricultural production.

In 1958, Fresno was selected by Bank of America to first launch the BankAmericard credit card, which was later renamed Visa.

Larger companies based in Fresno include Pelco, AGI Publishing, Lyons Magnus, Foster Farms, National Freight Logistics, Saladino's Sausage company, and Saladino's Foodservice company.

Top employers

According to the city's 2023 Annual Comprehensive Financial Report, the top employers in the city are:

| Ranking | Employer | Number of Employees |
|---|---|---|
| 1 | Fresno Unified School District | 13,669 |
| 2 | Community Medical Centers | 9,750 |
| 3 | County of Fresno | 8,980 |
| 4 | Amazon | 6,500 |
| 5 | Clovis Unified School District | 6,400 |
| 6 | California State University, Fresno | 5,233 |
| 7 | City of Fresno | 5,015 |
| 8 | State Center Community College District | 4,367 |
| 9 | Internal Revenue Service | 4,230 |
| 10 | Saint Agnes Medical Center | 2,900 |

== Arts and culture ==
The Forestiere Underground Gardens are a vast subterranean network, carved from 1906 to 1946.

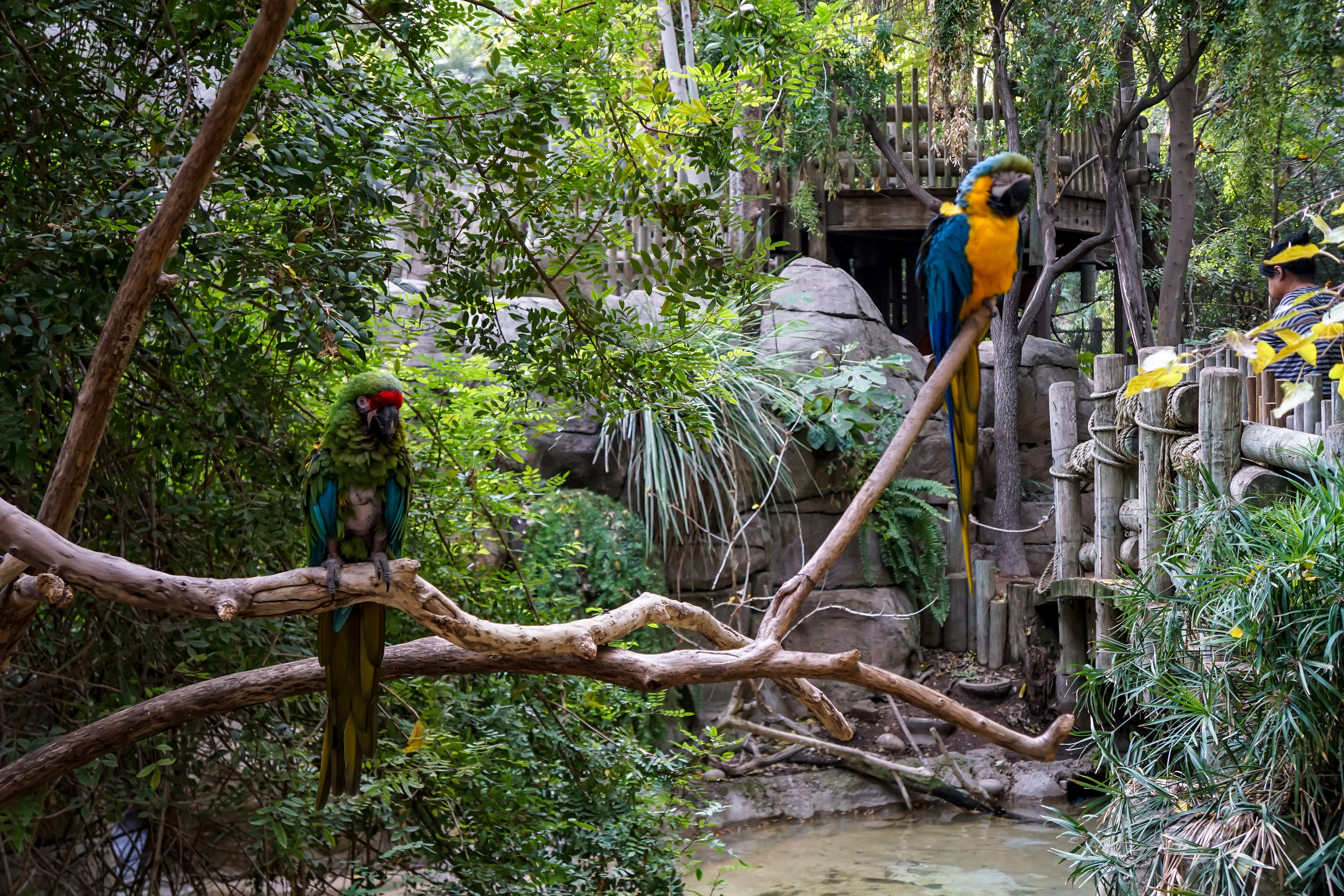
Exhibit at the Fresno Chaffee Zoo

=== Performing arts and music ===
- Artists' Repertory Theatre
- Children's Musical Theatreworks
- Center State Productions
- Fresno Philharmonic
- Philip Lorenz International Keyboard Concerts
- Roger Rocka's Dinner Theater & 2nd Space Theatre (Good Company Players)
- Rogue Festival
- Shine! Theatre
- Stageworks of Fresno
- Woodward Shakespeare Festival
- Youth Orchestras of Fresno

=== Theaters ===
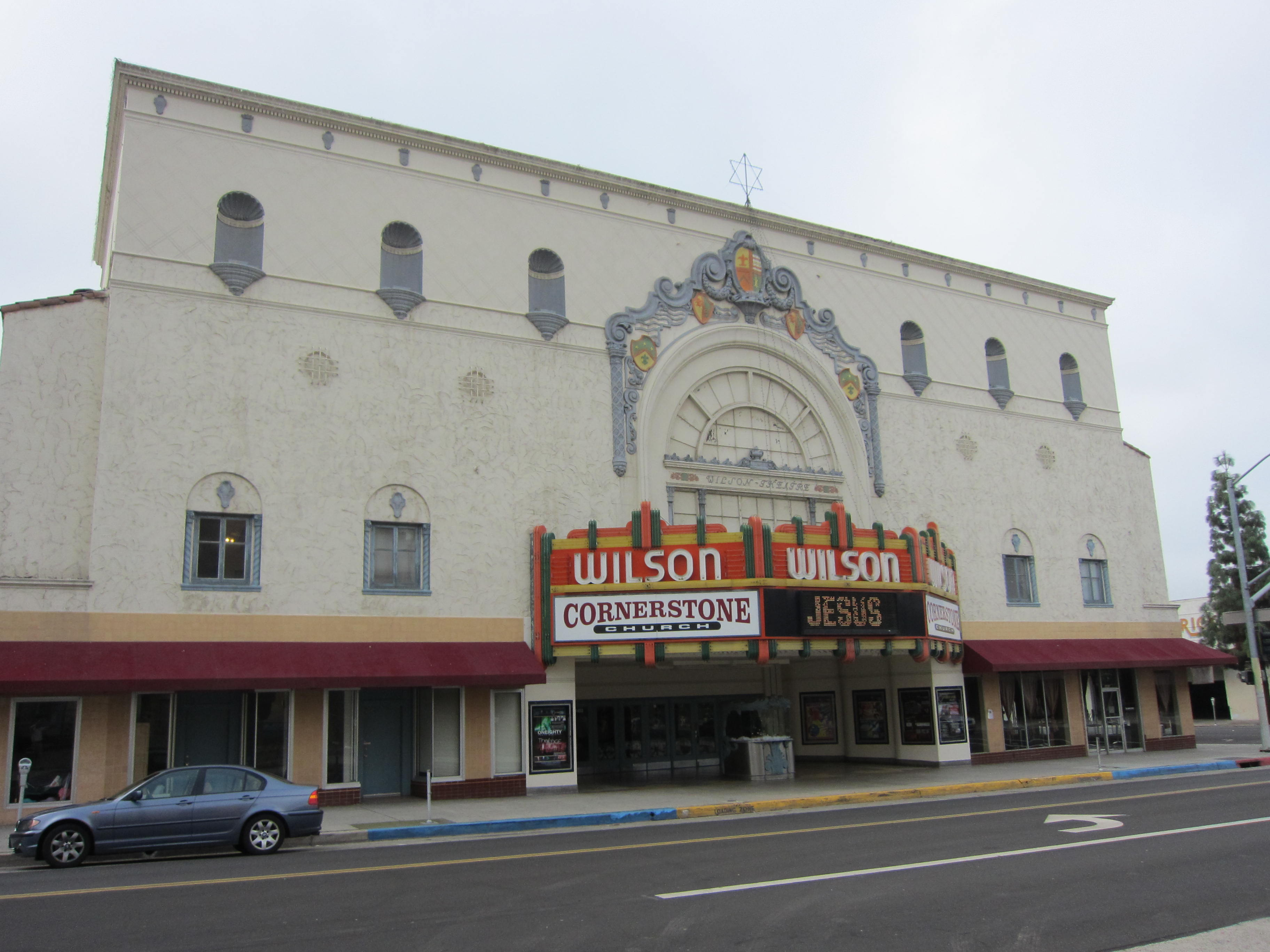
The historic Wilson Theatre

- Azteca Theater
- Crest Theatre
- Liberty Theatre
- Tower Theatre – Tower Theatre for the Performing Arts
- Warnors Theatre – Warnor's Center for the Performing Arts
- Wilson Theatre – currently Cornerstone Church
- Veteran's Memorial Auditorium
- Paul Shaghoian Memorial Concert Hall - Clovis North High School

=== Museums ===
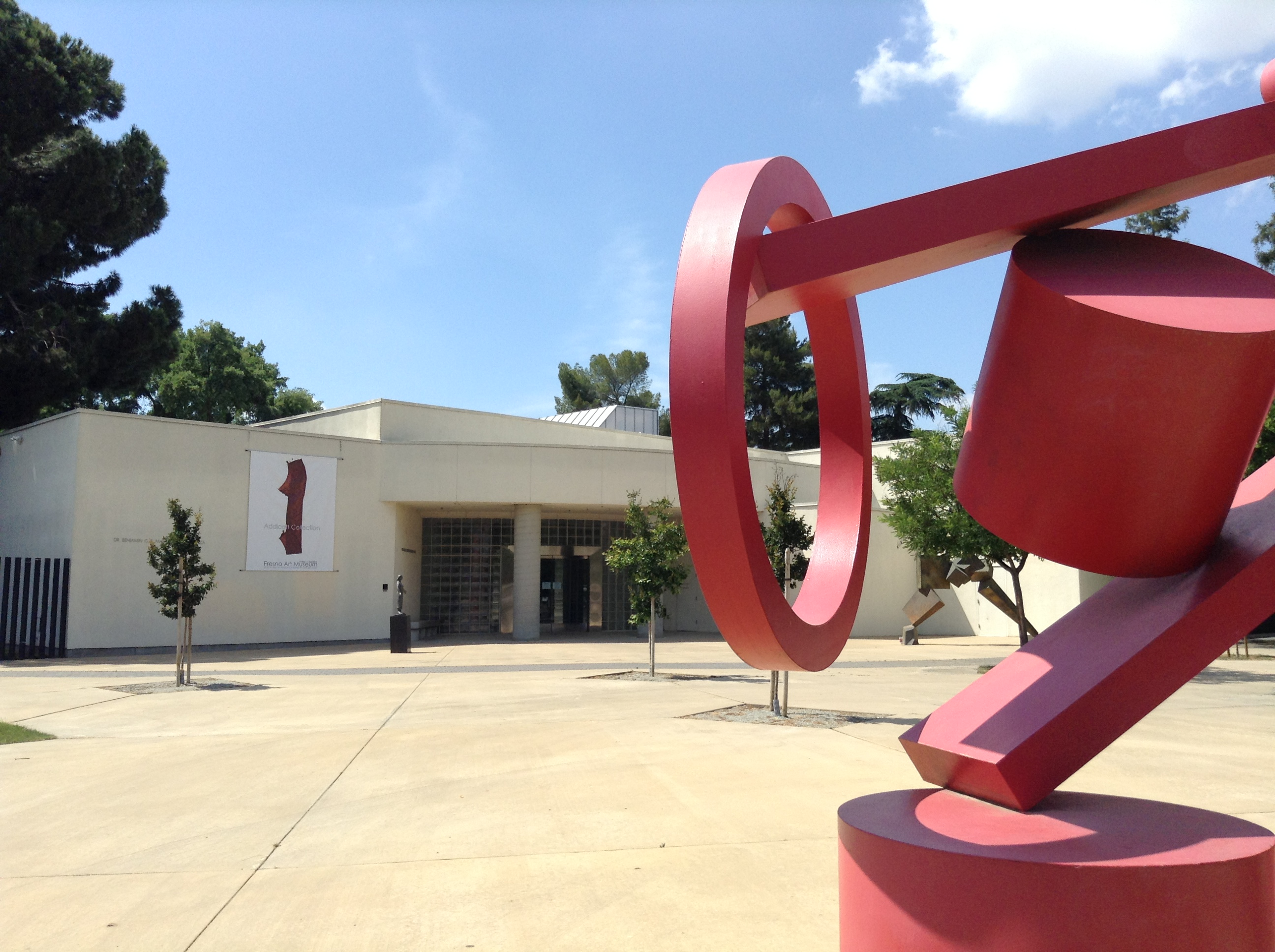
The Fresno Art Museum

- African-American Museum of the San Joaquin Valley
- Arte Américas
- Armenian Museum of Fresno
- Discovery Center
- William Saroyan House Museum
- Forestiere Underground Gardens
- Fresno Art Museum
- Kearney Mansion Museum
- Legion of Valor Museum
- Meux Home Museum
- Old Fresno Water Tower Tourist Center
- Fresno Chaffee Zoo
- Sierra Endangered Cat Haven (Fresno County)

=== Events ===
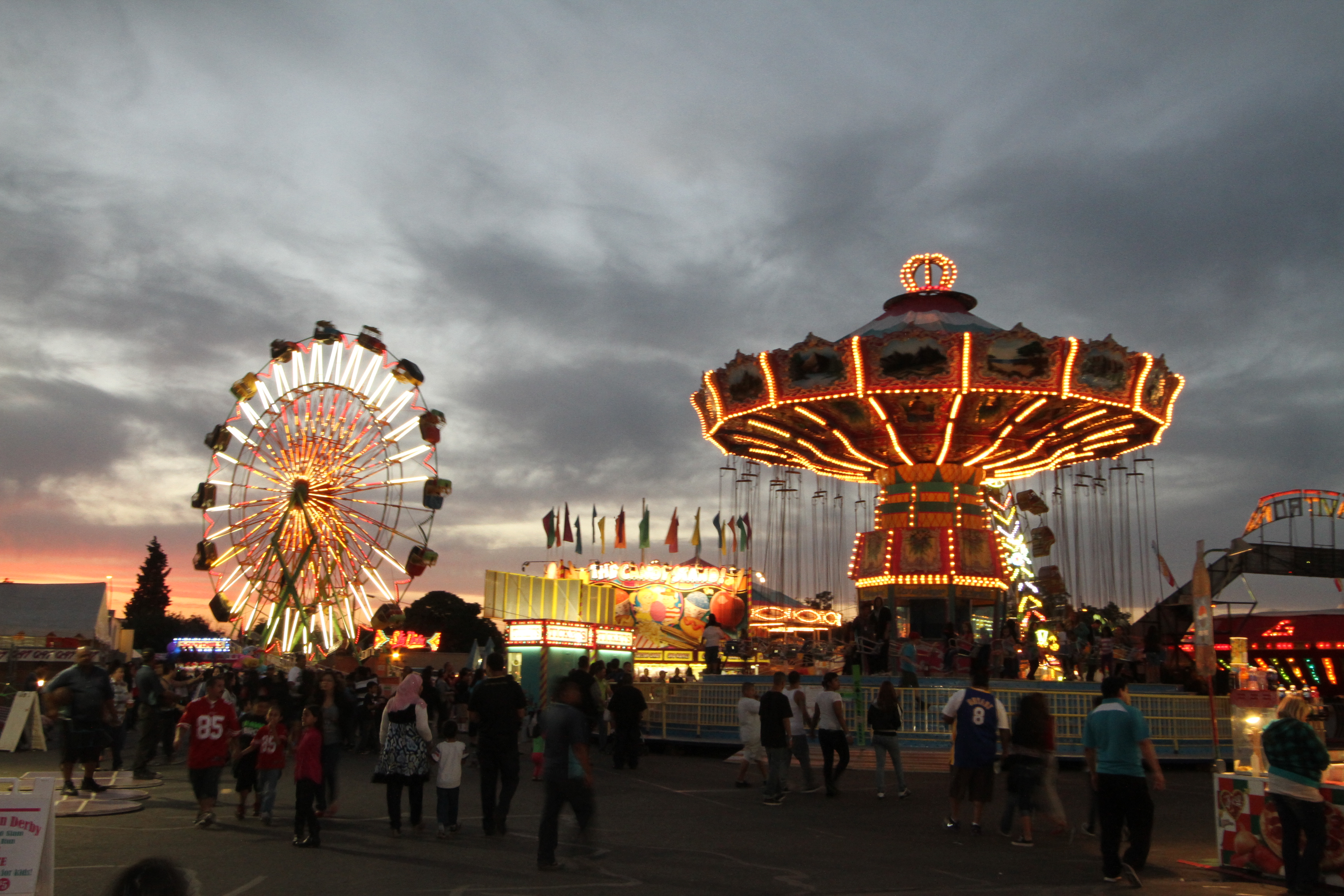
The Big Fresno Fair

- Ani-Me Con (every spring) Fresno's only anime convention.
- Armenian Grape Blessing (August)
- ArtHop (first Thursday of every month)
- The Big Fresno Fair, 12 days October, the largest event in the Central Valley attracting over 600,000 visitors
- Taco Truck Throwdown
- Christmas Tree Lane Every December
- Fresno LGBT Pride Parade, every June, first held in 1991
- Grizzly Fest April/May
- Valley DevFest (Fall)
- Vintage Days March or April
- Greek Fest three days every September

== Sports ==
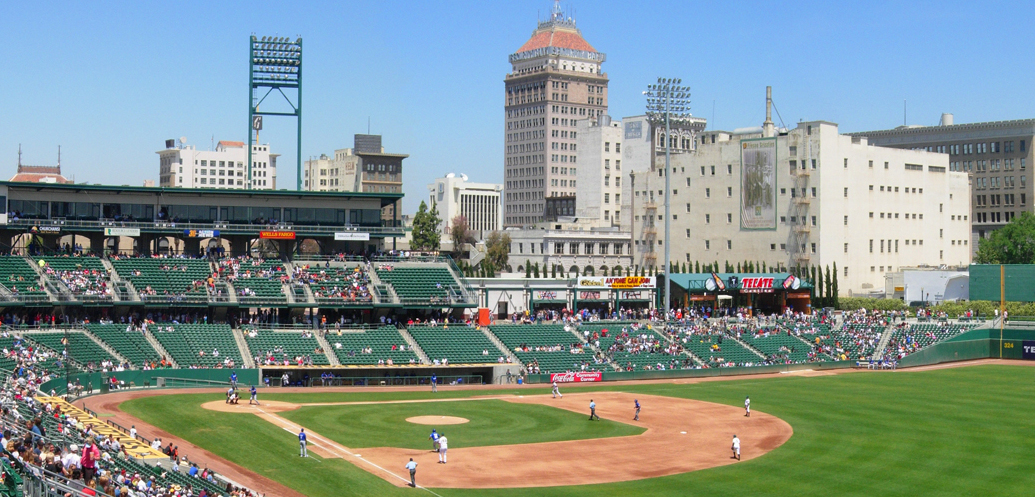
Chukchansi Park in Downtown Fresno, home of the Fresno Grizzlies

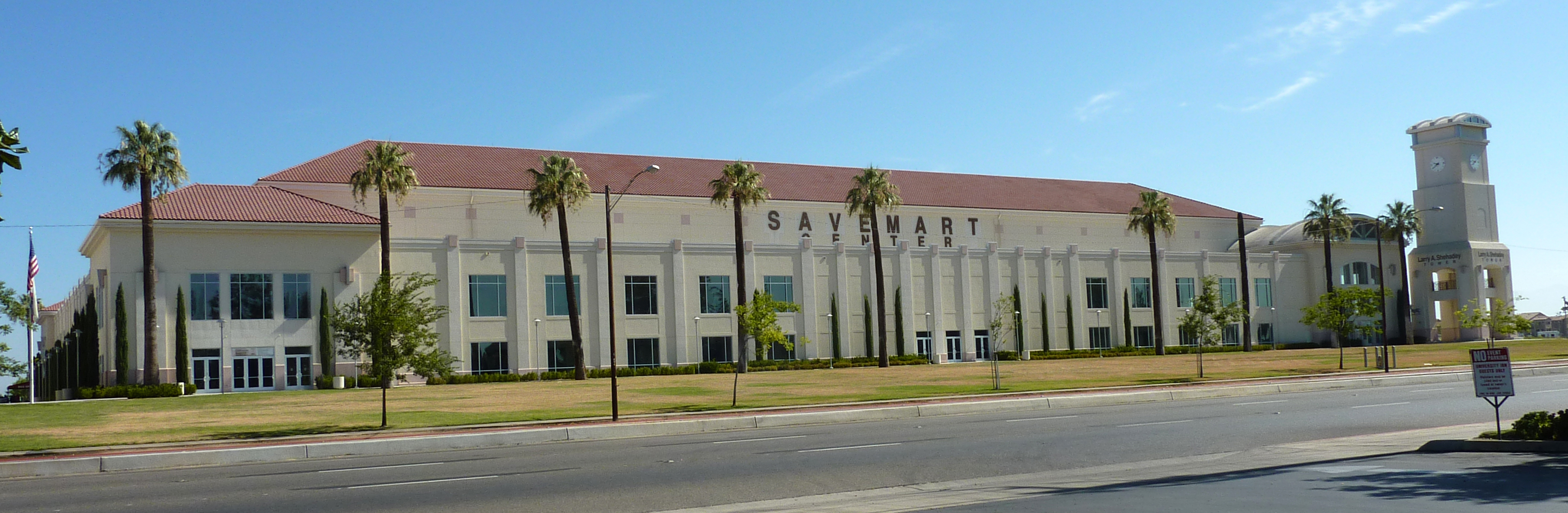
Save Mart Center, home of the Fresno State Bulldogs

- The Save Mart Center is a multi-purpose arena on the campus of the California State University, Fresno. It is home to the Fresno State Bulldogs men's basketball and Fresno State women's basketball teams and, for their first five seasons in the ECHL (2003–08) the Fresno Falcons ice hockey team. It also hosts a wide range of musical acts and other events.
- Margie Wright Diamond is the home to Fresno State's nationally successful softball program. Softball is the most successful sports program at Fresno State due to achievement. Fresno State's softball program is the first school program to win a national title. The diamond is named in honor of Margie Wright, who led the Bulldogs softball team to eight Women's College World Series appearances, including a Women's College World Series championship in 1998. Wright was the assistant coach of the 1996 US women's Olympic softball team. The team won the gold medal in the 1996 Atlanta Summer Olympics. Four current (at the time) Fresno State Bulldog softball players played on the 1996 Olympic team: infielders Laura Berg, Kim Maher and Julie Smith, and catcher Shelley Stokes.
- Pete Beiden Field is also located on the Fresno State campus. It is home to the Fresno State Bulldogs baseball program. Fresno State baseball has been highly successful and like softball, has also won a national title. They won the 2008 College World Series. They have made over 30 NCAA tournament appearances, including four College World Series appearances. The field was also the home of the minor league Fresno Grizzlies before their move to Chukchansi Park in Downtown Fresno.
- Valley Children's Stadium, a 41,031-seat football stadium located on the Fresno State campus. It is home to the Fresno State Bulldogs football program. Fresno State football games consistently have the highest attendance rate of any sporting event in Fresno.
- Fresno's Woodward Park is the location of the CIF Cross Country State Championships, where high schoolers from around the state compete. Additionally the BMX course in the park plays host to the National Bicycle League State Championships.
- Ratcliffe Stadium, on the campus of Fresno City College, is a 13,000-seat track and field stadium. The stadium played host to the West Coast Relays. It is home to the college's football program and is also host to high school football games and track and field events.

The Fresno Yacht Club established in 1959 hosts the High Sierra Regatta on Huntington Lake every July (barring extreme drought) and regular sailing on Millerton Lake.

List of Fresno-based professional sports teams:

| Club | Sport | Founded | League (level) | Venue |
|---|---|---|---|---|
| Fresno Grizzlies | Baseball | 1998 | California League (Single-A) | Chukchansi Park |
| Fresno Monsters | Ice hockey | 2009 | United States Premier Hockey League (junior) | Selland Arena & Gateway Ice Center |
| Fuego FC | Soccer | 2020 | USL League One | Fresno State Soccer Stadium |

== Government ==
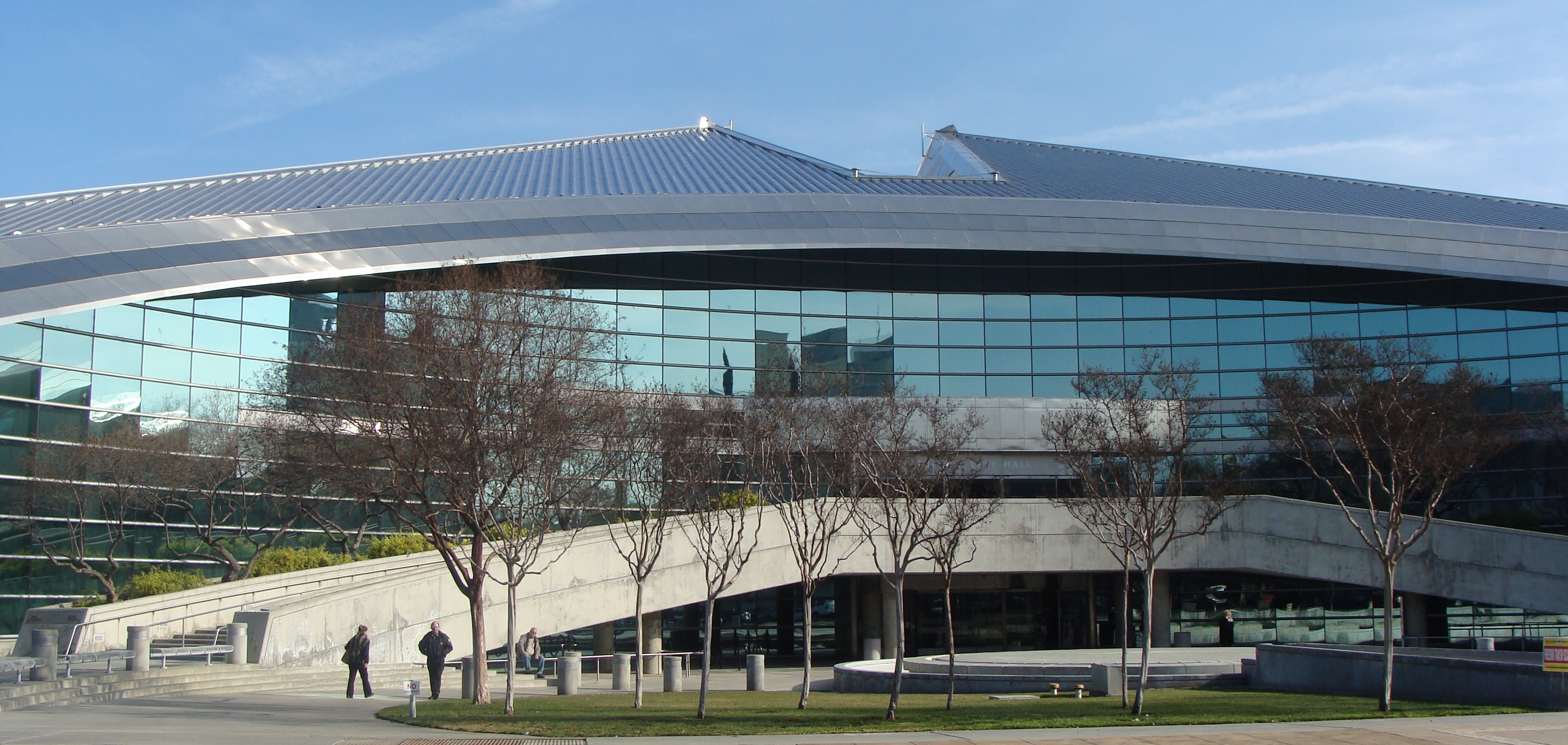
Fresno City Hall, designed by architect Arthur Erickson and completed in 1991

Fresno has a strong-mayor form of government. The mayor (executive branch) is directly elected and the seven city council members (legislative branch) are elected by district with no "at-large" seats. The mayor and council members are elected for no more than two 4-year terms. The mayor's office and council positions are officially nonpartisan and not affiliated with any political party. The current mayor is Jerry Dyer, who is a Republican. Should the Mayor pass away, be incapacitated, or be removed from office, the Council President shall serve as Mayor until a new Mayor is elected in a special election, per the Charter.

=== City Council ===
- District 1 - Annalisa Perea
- District 2 - Mike Karbassi (Council President)
- District 3 - Miguel Arias (Council Vice President)
- District 4 - Tyler Maxwell
- District 5 - Brandon Vang
- District 6 - Nick Richardson
- District 7 - Nelson Esparza

Prior to 1901, Fresno's government was under a ward system which allowed for a board of trustees. From the trustees elected by the city wards, a president of the board of trustees would act as ex-officio mayor however did not hold the title of mayor. Because of this, the president of the board of trustees is not recognized as mayors of the City of Fresno.

=== Courts ===
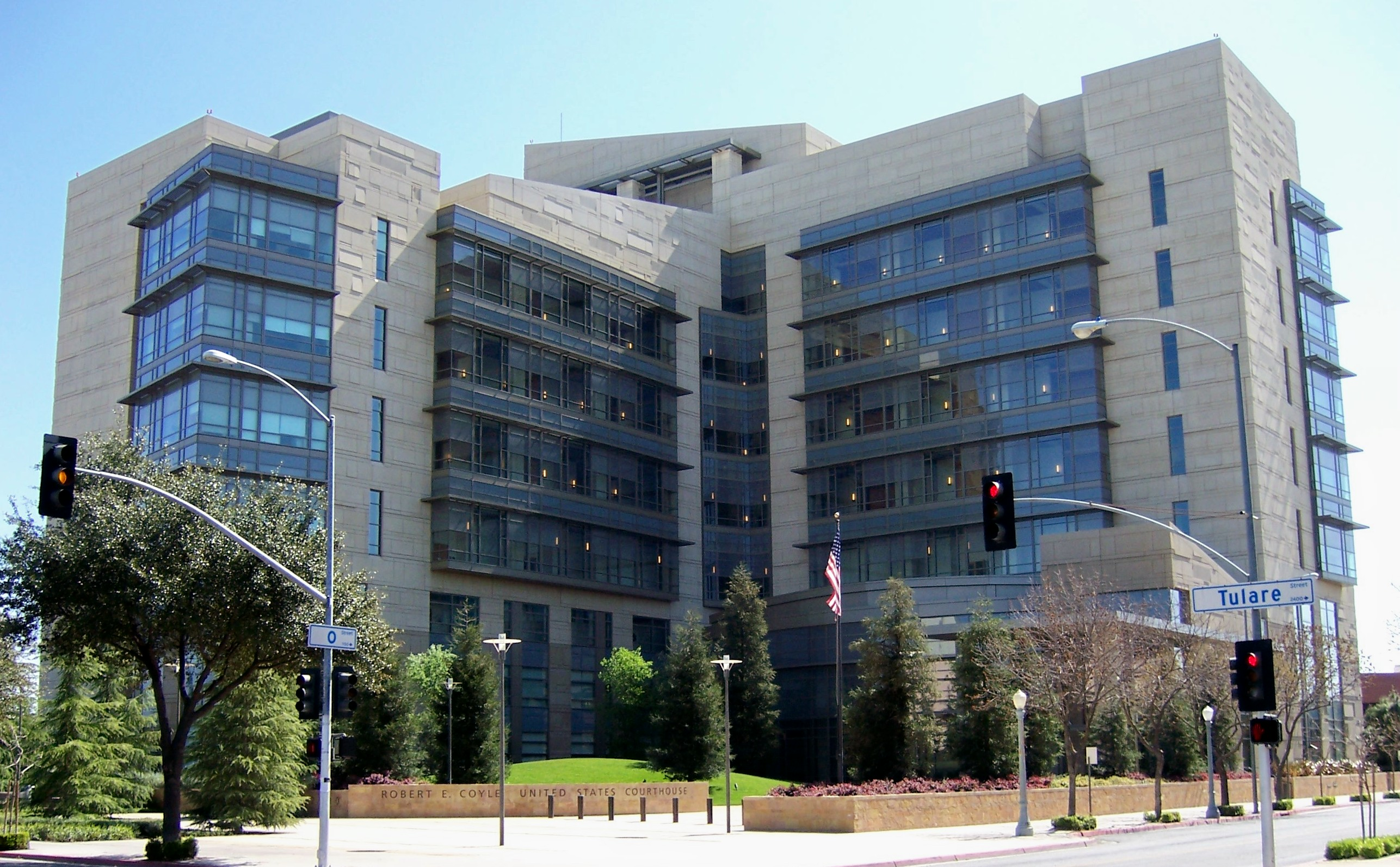
The Robert E. Coyle Courthouse is one of the two seats of the Eastern District of California.

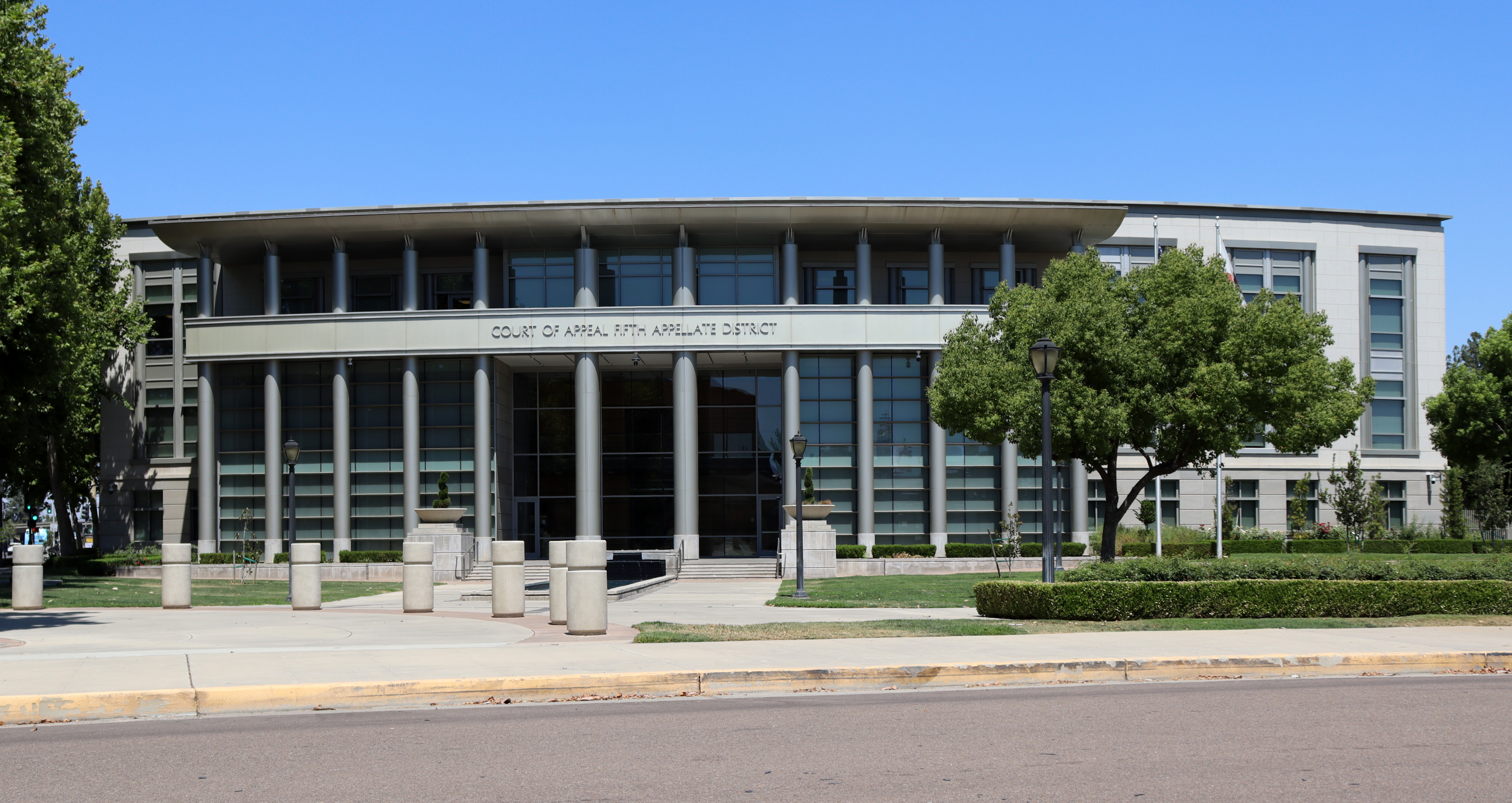
The courthouse of the California Court of Appeal for the Fifth Appellate District

Fresno is the county seat of Fresno County. It maintains the main county courthouse on Van Ness in the Fresno County Plaza for criminal and some civil court cases.

The United States District Court, Eastern District of California, has one of its six divisions based in the Robert E. Coyle Courthouse. The new courthouse replaced the B.F. Sisk Federal Building in 2006 because it did not have enough space for the growing Fresno Division. After extensive renovation, the building reopened in November 2010 as the B.F. Sisk Courthouse serving the Fresno County Superior Court.

Fresno is also the seat of the Court of Appeal for the Fifth Appellate District, for which a new courthouse was built in 2007 in the old Armenian Town section of downtown Fresno across from the Fresno Convention Center. The Fifth District Court of Appeal's courthouse was formally dedicated as the George N. Zenovich Building, after former state senator and associate justice of the Fifth District, George N. Zenovich.

=== Politics ===
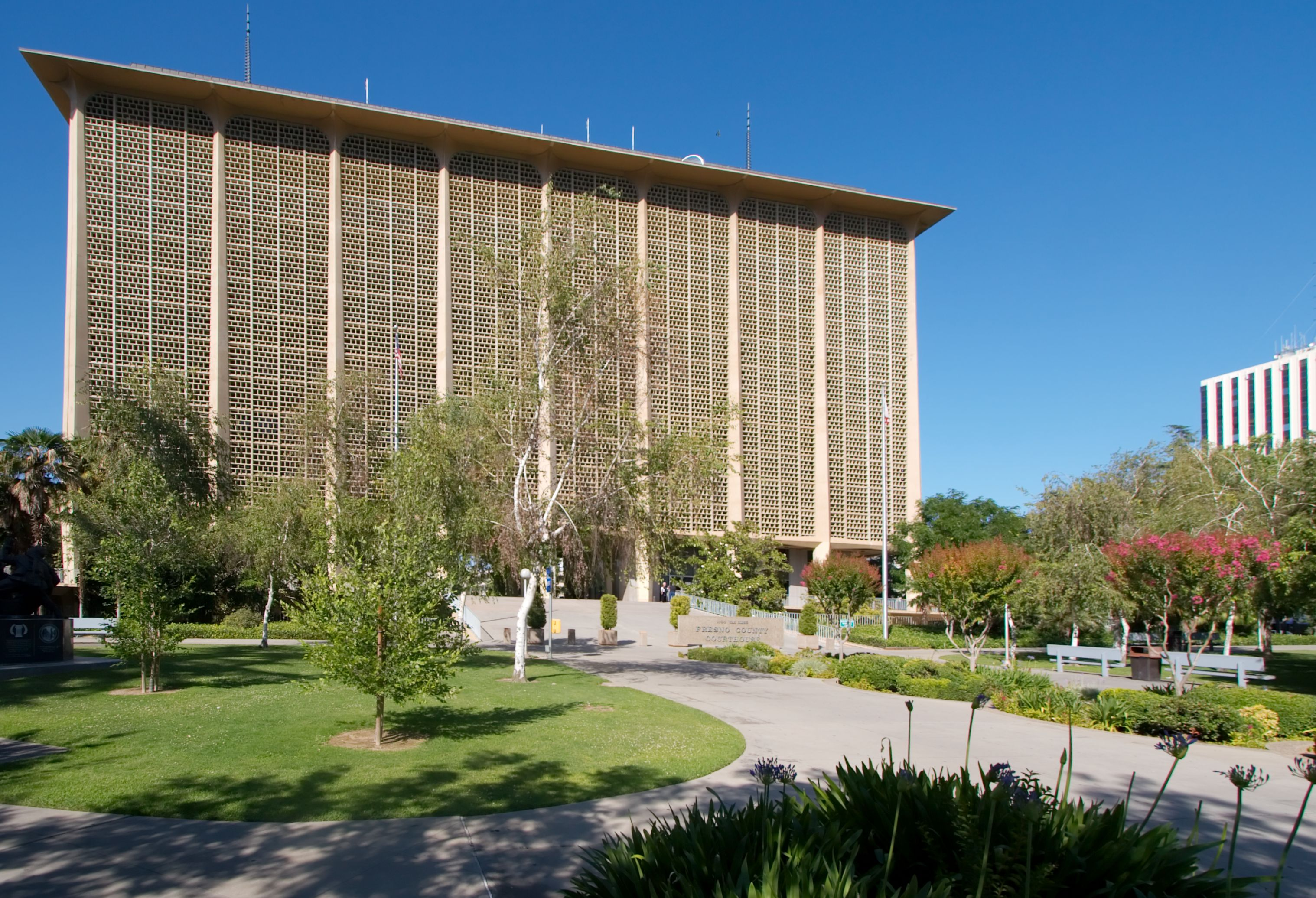
Fresno County Courthouse

As of 2016, according to Fresno County Registrar of Voters, the majority of registered voters in both the city and county of Fresno are registered to the Democratic Party. According to the county registrar's official final report U.S. President Barack Obama carried the county 49.99% in the 2008 United States presidential election.

=== State and federal representation ===
The citizens of Fresno are represented in the California State Senate by Democrat Anna Caballero in District 14 and Republican Shannon Grove in District 12. They are represented in the California State Assembly by Republican David Tangipa in District 8, Democrat Esmeralda Soria in District 27 and Democrat Joaquin Arambula in District 31.

The citizens of Fresno are represented in the United States House of Representatives by Representative Jim Costa, Democrat, in District 21, and Vince Fong, Republican, in District 20.

== Education ==
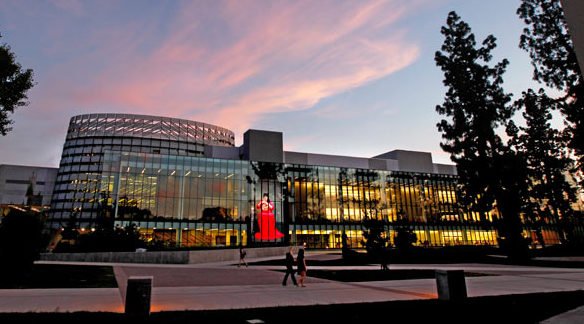
Fresno State Library at California State University, Fresno

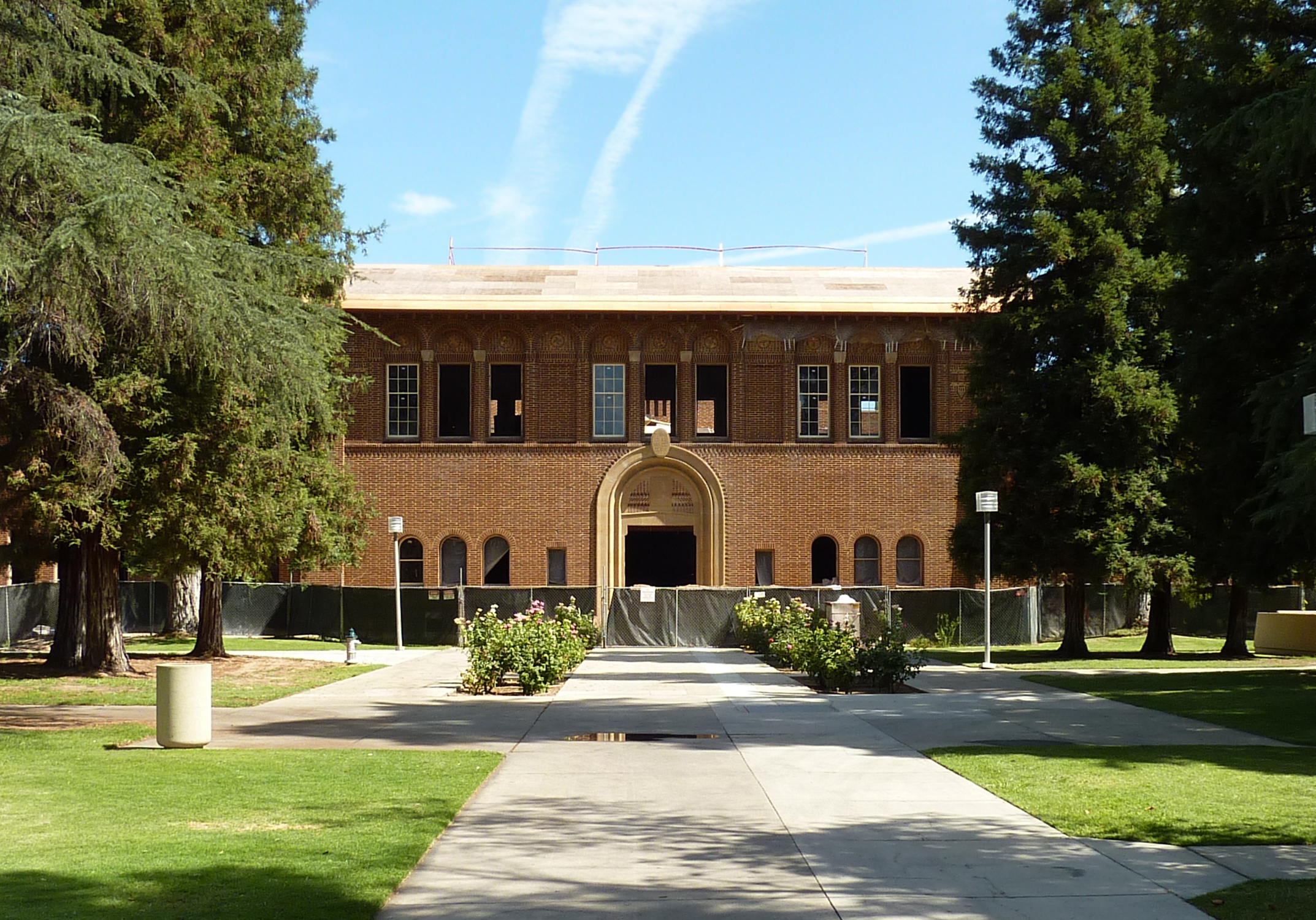
The Old Administration Building at Fresno City College, listed on the National Register of Historic Places

=== Four-year institutions ===
California State University, Fresno, is the only four year public university in Fresno.

Private institutions include

- Alliant International University (For Profit)
- California Christian College (Private/Freewill Baptist)
- Fresno Pacific University (Private/Mennonite Brethren)
  - Fresno Pacific University Biblical Seminary
- Kaplan College, Fresno campus (formerly Maric College)
- National University, Fresno campus
- University of Phoenix (Private) (For Profit)
- DeVry University (Private) (For Profit, Career)

Additional institutions offering specialized, non-degree granting programs include:

- University of California, Merced outreach center and K-12 partnerships
- University of California, San Francisco medical resident training program

=== Two-year institutions ===
Public community colleges include Fresno City College and Clovis Community College.

=== Career colleges ===
- University of Phoenix
- DeVry University
- Institute of Technology
- San Joaquin Valley College
- UEI College

=== Public K-12 schools ===
Most of Fresno is in the Fresno Unified School District though portions are served by the following unified school districts for grades PK-12: Clovis Unified School District, Central Unified School District, Fowler Unified School District, Washington Union Unified School District, and Sanger Unified School District. Additionally, two elementary school districts cover parts of Fresno: Orange Center Elementary School District and West Park Elementary School District; both districts feed into the Washington Unified School District for grades 9-12.

=== Private K-12 schools ===
- Fresno Christian High School (Evangelical Christian)
- San Joaquin Memorial High School (Roman Catholic)
- Fresno Adventist Academy (Seventh Day Adventist)

== Media ==
=== Newspapers ===
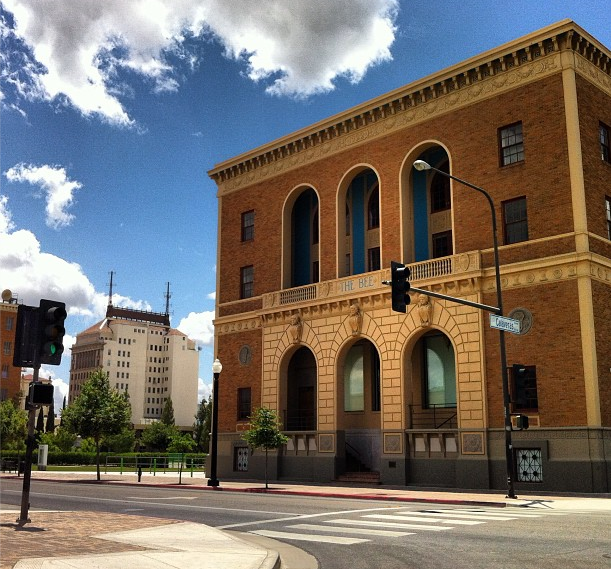
The historic Fresno Bee Building, the newspaper's former headquarters

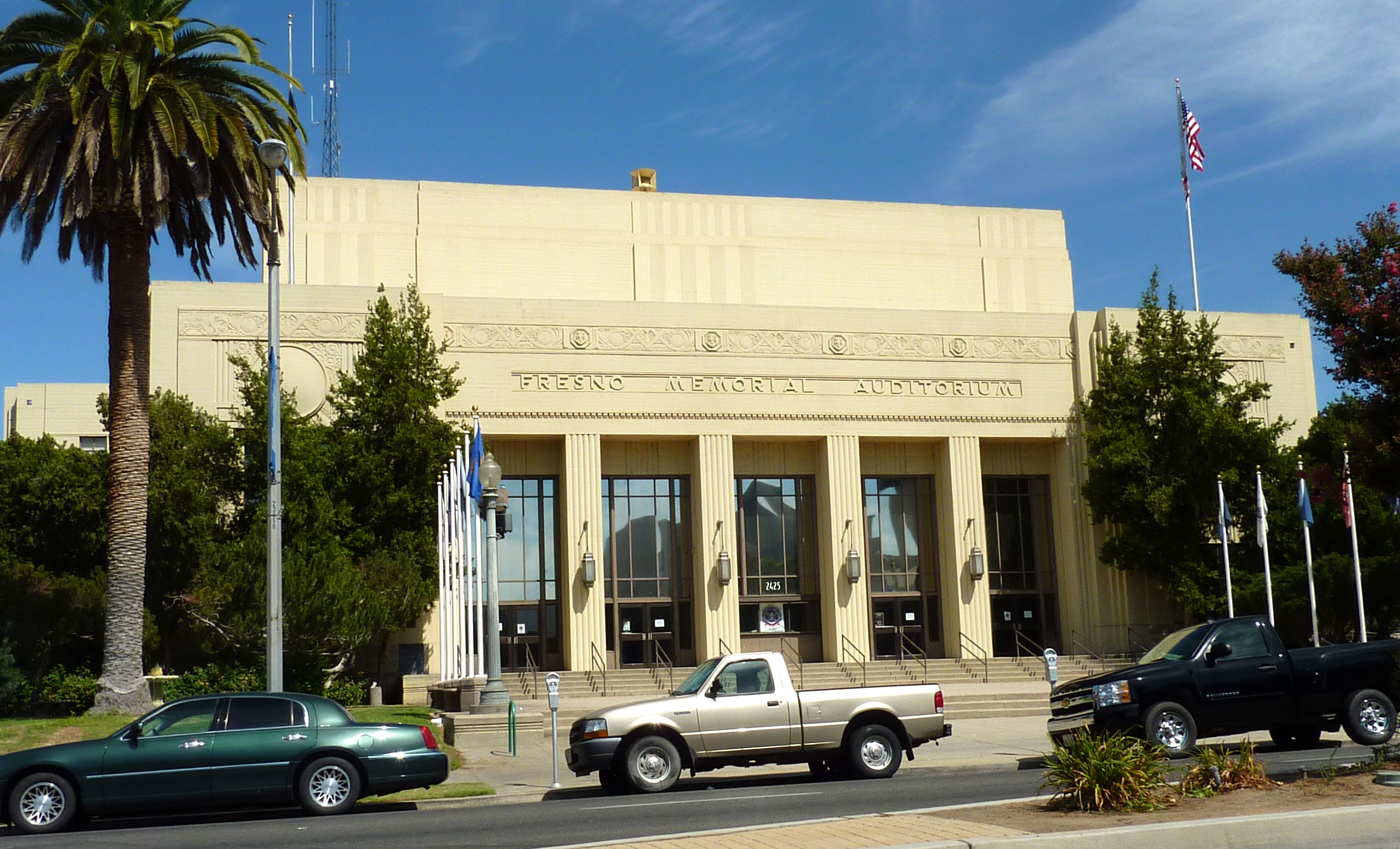
Fresno Memorial Auditorium

- The Business Journal
- The Fresno Bee
- The Community Alliance

=== Radio ===
- KMJ, AM 580, 50,000-watt and FM 105.9, is Fresno's first radio station; it began broadcasting in 1922. Its powerful 50,000-watt signal can be heard throughout much of California.
- KYNO AM 940, 50,000-watt oldies station
- KFIG AM 1430, 5,000-watt ESPN affiliate
- 88.1 KFCF is Fresno's Pacifica station, and one of Fresno's few non-commercial, non-corporate radio stations.
- 89.3 KVPR, provides National Public Radio Programming & classical music throughout the Central California region.
- 90.7 KFSR is another non-commercial, non-corporate station that plays a full spectrum format, including Jazz, eclectic, Armenian, and others. Based on the CSUF campus.
- 94.9 KBOS-FM More commonly known as B95 – Fresno's Hip-Hop Station

=== Television ===
To avoid interference with existing VHF television stations in the San Francisco Bay Area and those planned for Chico, Sacramento, Salinas, and Stockton, the Federal Communications Commission decided that Fresno would be a UHF island (only have UHF television stations).

The first Fresno television station to begin broadcasting was KMJ-TV, which debuted on June 1, 1953. KMJ-TV is now known as NBC affiliate KSEE. Other Fresno stations include ABC O&O KFSN-TV, CBS affiliate KGPE, The CW affiliate KFRE-TV, FOX affiliate KMPH-TV, MNTV affiliate KMSG-LD, PBS member station KVPT, Telemundo O&O KNSO, Univision O&O KFTV-DT, and Estrella TV affiliate KGMC.

In partnership with the City of Clovis, the City of Fresno opened the Community Media Access Collaborative (CMAC) in April 2012, a public, education and government access television station.

== Infrastructure ==
Since 2010, statewide droughts in California have strained both Fresno's and the entire Central Valley's water security. The city uses surface water from Millerton Lake and Pine Flat Reservoir to supply a pair of water treatment plants.

== Transportation ==
=== Highways ===
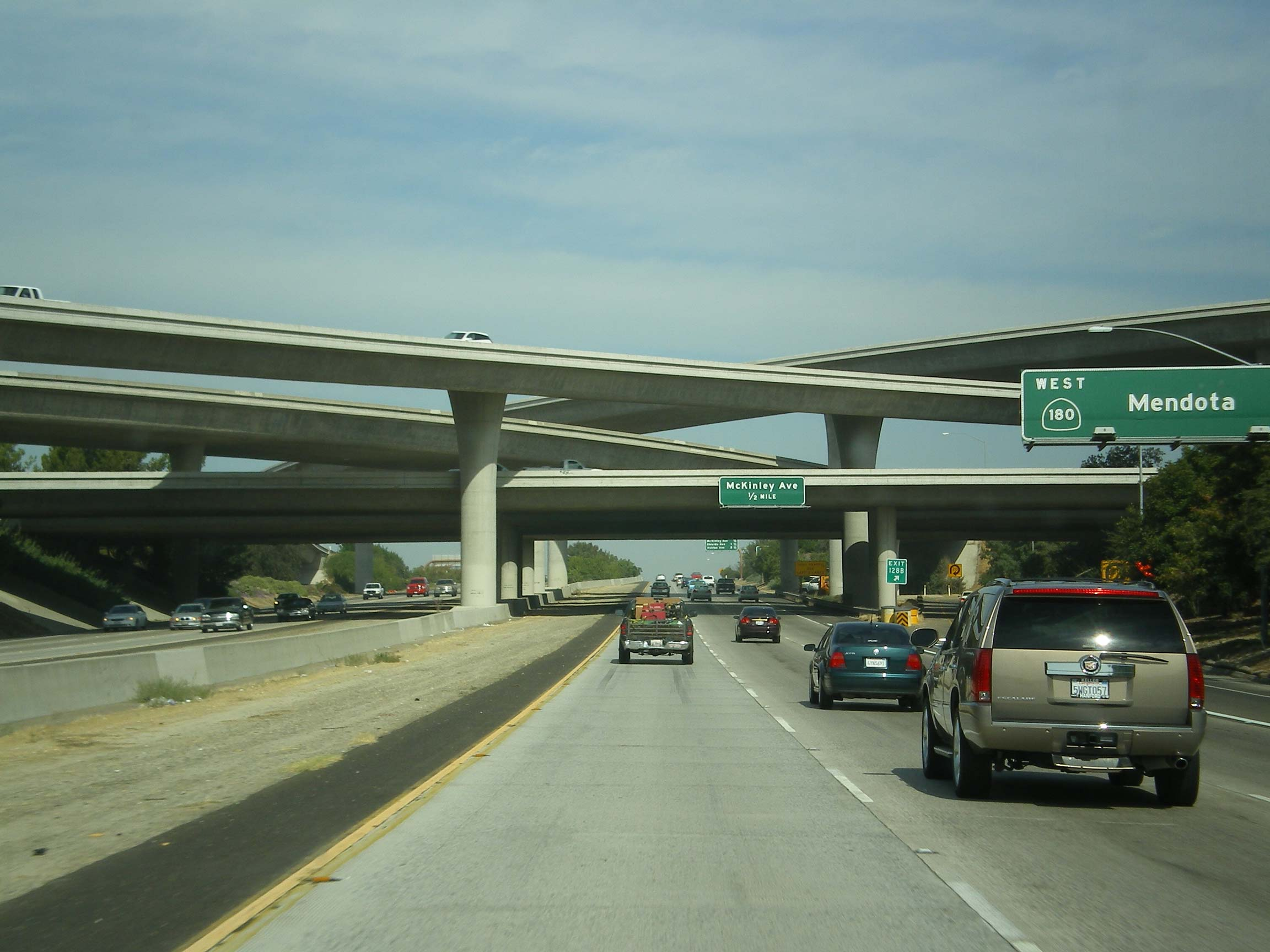
The interchange between State Routes 41 and 180 in Downtown Fresno

Fresno is served by State Route 99, the main north–south freeway that connects the major population centers of California's Central Valley. State Route 168, the Sierra Freeway, heads east to the city of Clovis and Huntington Lake. State Route 41 (Yosemite Freeway/Eisenhower Freeway) comes into Fresno from Atascadero in the south, and then heads north to Yosemite National Park. State Route 180 (Kings Canyon Freeway) comes from the west via Mendota, and then east through the city of Reedley to Kings Canyon National Park.

Fresno is the most populous U.S. city not directly linked to an Interstate highway. When the Interstate Highway System was created in the 1950s, the decision was made to build what is now Interstate 5 on the west side of the Central Valley, and thus bypass many of the population centers in the region, instead of upgrading what is now State Route 99. Due to rapidly rising population and traffic in cities along SR 99, as well as the desirability of Federal funding, much discussion has been made to upgrade it to interstate standards and eventually incorporate it into the interstate system, most likely as Interstate 7 or 9. Major improvements to signage, lane width, median separation, vertical clearance, and other concerns are currently underway.

=== Bus services ===
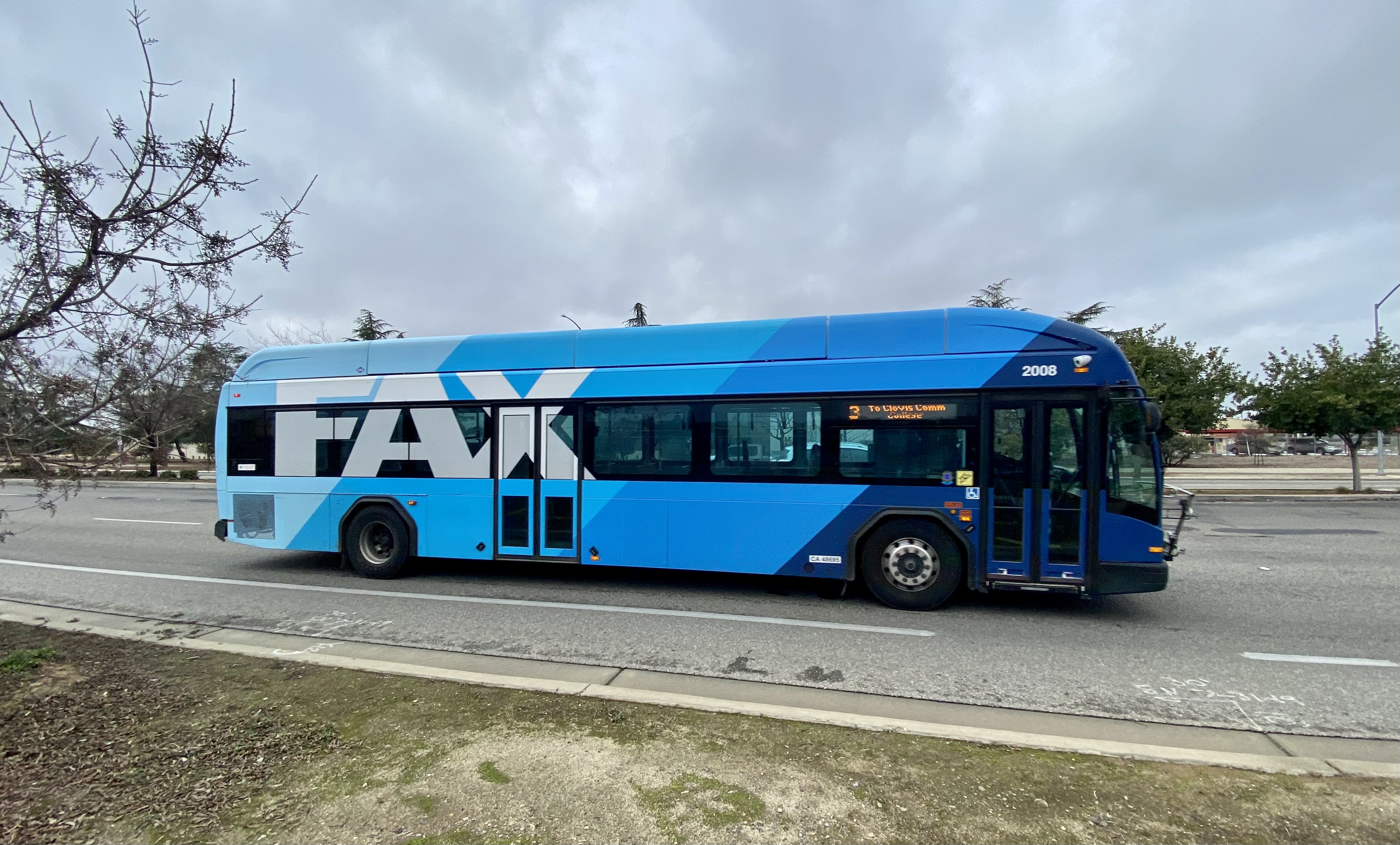
Fresno Area Express bus

Fresno Area Express (FAX) is the city's primary public transit system, which operates eighteen routes and Handy Ride, a paratransit operation. FAX introduced a frequent bus service called FAX15 in January 2017 with buses operating every 15 minutes on Cedar and Shaw Avenues. The FAX Q line, which the agency brands as bus rapid transit, was introduced in February 2018 and offers service as often as every 10 minutes on Blackstone Avenue, Ventura Avenue and Kings Canyon Road.

As the county seat and the largest city in the region, Fresno also sees service from neighboring regional bus services including Clovis Transit, Fresno County Rural Transit Agency, Kings Area Regional Transit, and Visalia Transit's V-LINE. Intercity and long-distance bus services are provided by Greyhound and Megabus.

The Yosemite Area Regional Transportation System added summer seasonal service between Fresno and Yosemite National Park in May 2015.

The city once provided trolley service during the late 19th and early 20th century. Known as the Fresno City Railway Company and later the Fresno Traction Company, the service operated horse-drawn streetcars from 1887 to 1901. Electric streetcars were introduced in 1903. The electric streetcars were used until 1939. A proposal to include a modern light rail system in long-term transportation plans was rejected by the Fresno County Board of Supervisors in January 1987.

=== Airports ===
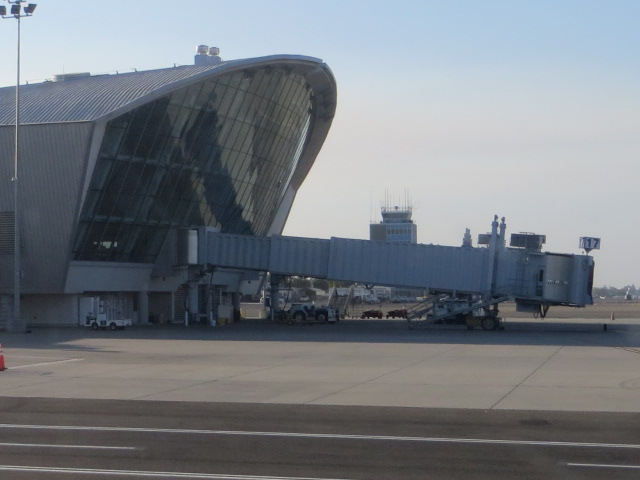
Fresno Yosemite International Airport terminal

Fresno Yosemite International Airport (airport code: FAT), formerly known as Fresno Air Terminal, provides regularly scheduled commercial airline service. The airport serves an estimated 2.7 million passengers annually.

Fresno Chandler Executive Airport (airport code: FCH) is 2 mi (3.2 km) southwest of Downtown Fresno. Built in the 1920s by the Works Projects Administration, it is one of the oldest operational airports in California. The airport currently serves as a general aviation airport.

Sierra Sky Park Airport (airport code: E79) in Northwest Fresno is a privately owned airport, but is open to the public. Extra-wide streets surrounding the airport allow for residents of the community to land, taxi down the extra-wide streets, and park their aircraft in a garage at their home. Sierra Sky Park is recognized as the first residential aviation community in the world.

=== Rail ===
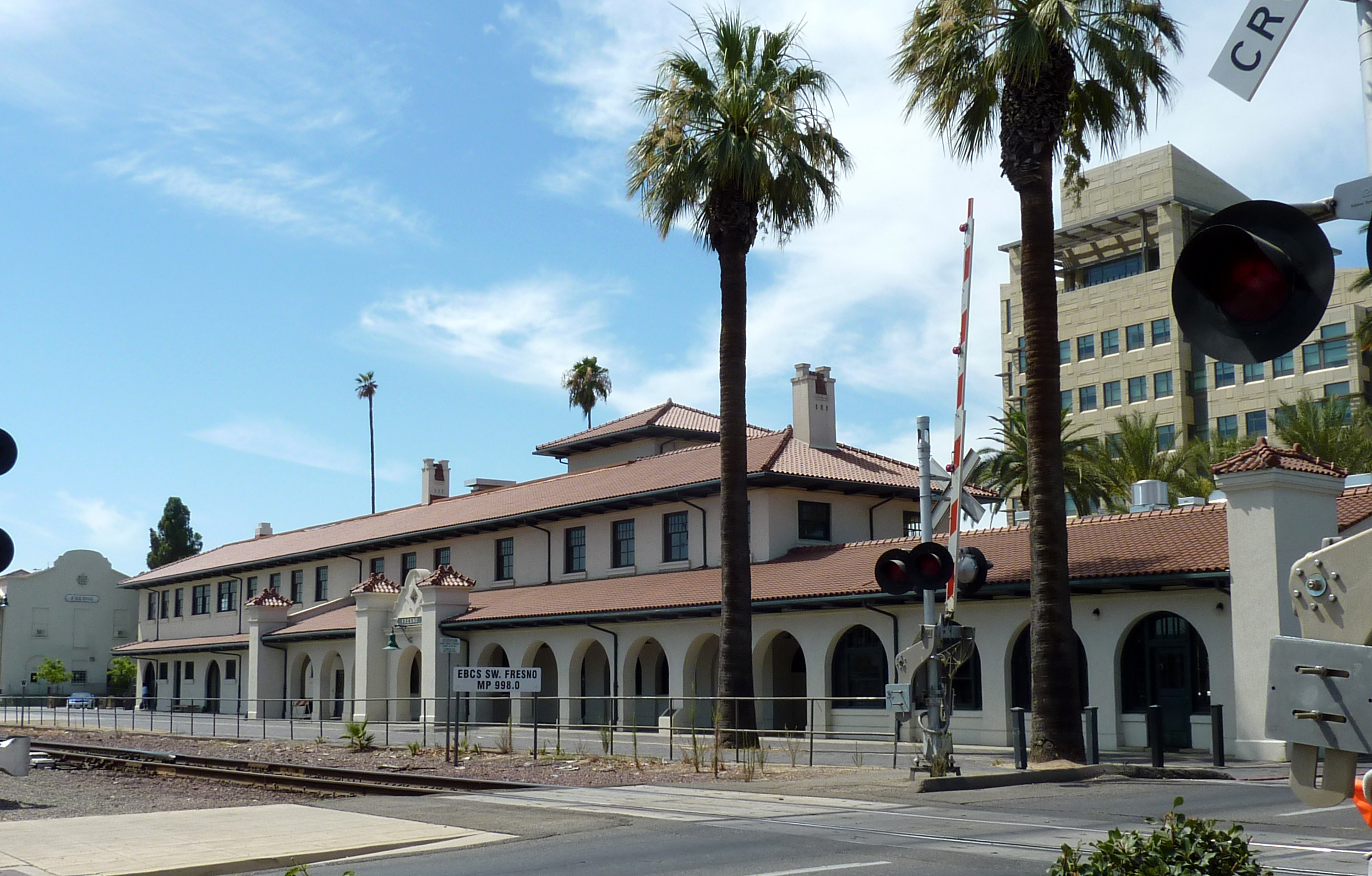
Historic Santa Fe Station in Downtown Fresno

Passenger rail service is provided by Amtrak Gold Runner. The main passenger rail station is the renovated historic Santa Fe Railroad Depot in Downtown Fresno. The city of Fresno is planned to be served by the future California High-Speed Rail.

Freight rail service is provided by both the BNSF Railway and the Union Pacific Railroad, which both operate Bakersfield-Stockton mainlines that cross in Fresno, and both railroads maintain railyards within the city. The Class III (or shortline) San Joaquin Valley Railroad also operates former Southern Pacific branch lines heading west and south out of the city. The railroad is deemed often the last railroad in the world to have Magnetic Flagmen signals, better known as wigwags, in revenue freight service.

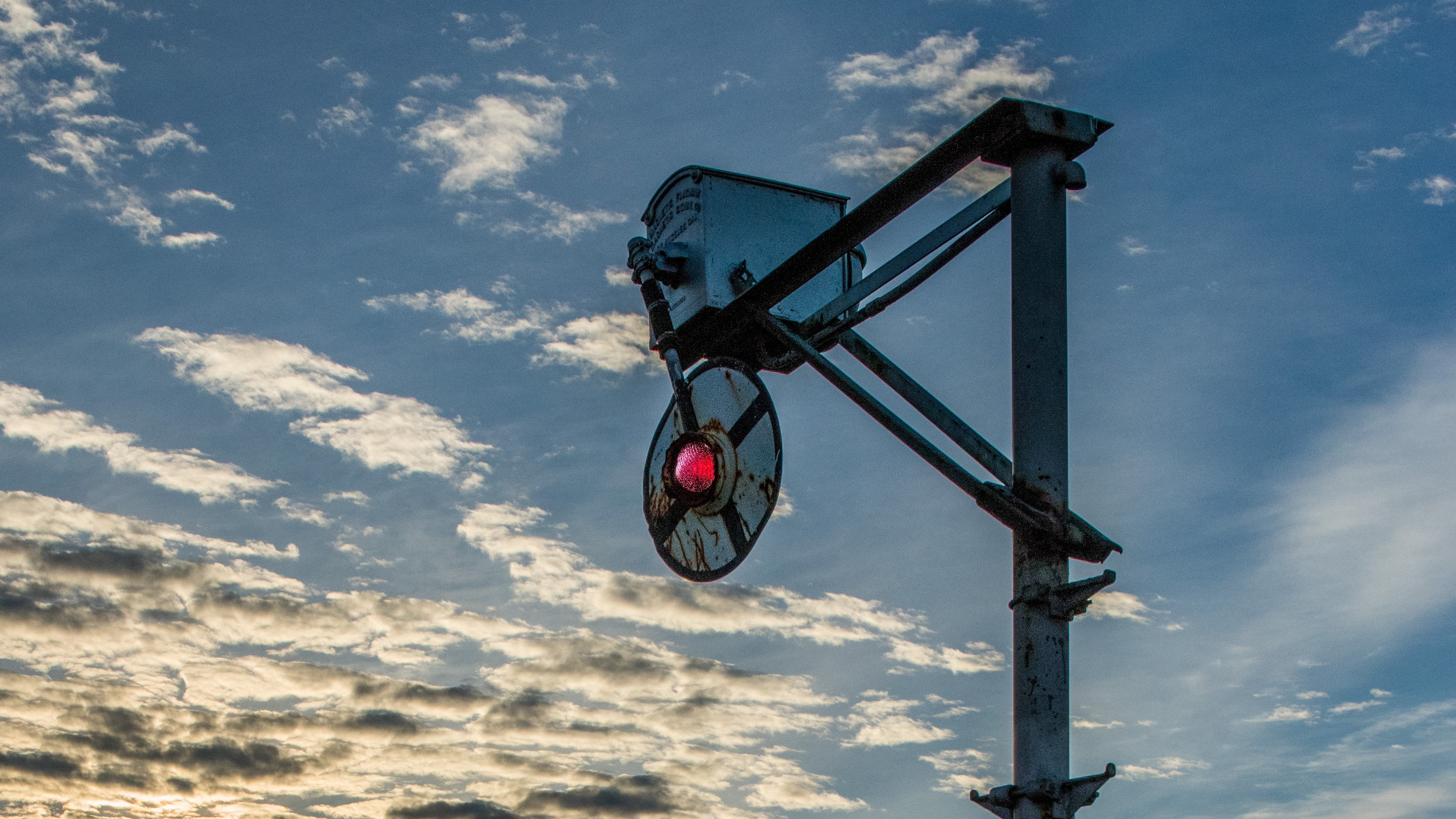
Fulton Street, Fresno CA

== In popular culture ==
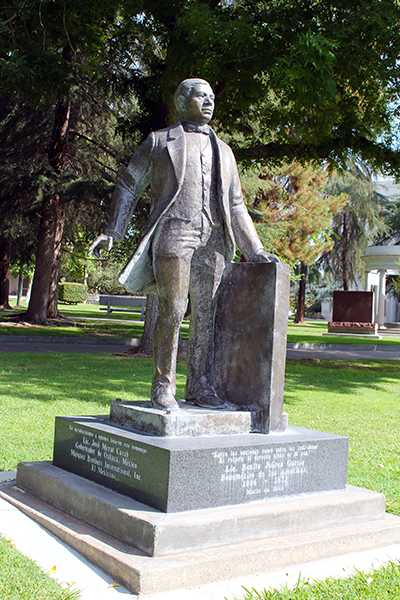
Statue of Benito Juárez in Courthouse Park

In the 1970s, the city was the subject of a song, "Walking Into Fresno", written by guitarist Bill Aken and recorded by Bob Gallion of the WWVA Jamboree radio and television show in Wheeling, West Virginia.

Fictional residents of the town were portrayed in a 1986 comedic miniseries titled Fresno, featuring Carol Burnett, Dabney Coleman, Teri Garr and Charles Grodin, along with numerous other celebrities. The mini series was presented as a parody of the prime time soap operas popular in the 1980s.

BBC documentarian, Louis Theroux, visited Fresno, and rode with Fresno police as they dealt with the high drug usage in the city. Additionally, he interviewed many of the individuals involved in the drug scene, some languishing in their habit, and others working to overcome it. From that footage, he produced a British documentary The City Addicted to Crystal Meth, first aired on August 9, 2009.

Fresno is mentioned in the 2009 animated film Monsters vs. Aliens.

The 2014 horror film Unfriended is set in Fresno along with the 2000 Motocross film Fresno Smooth.

The Fresno nightcrawler is a cryptid first documented in Fresno in 2007.

== Twin towns – sister cities ==
Fresno's sister cities are:

- Guadalajara, Mexico
- Kōchi, Japan (1965)
- Münster, Germany (1984)
- Morogoro, Tanzania (1992)
- Verona, Italy (2000, friendship not sister)
- Vagharshapat (also known as Etchmiadzin), Armenia (2009)
- Châteauroux, France (2016)
- Taishan, China
- Afula-Gilboa, Israel
- Taraz (formerly known as Djambul; relationship currently inactive), Kazakhstan
- Torreon, Mexico

== See also ==
- Environmental issues in Fresno, California
- Fresno County Public Library
- Fresno Police Department
- 2017 Fresno shootings
- 2019 Fresno shooting
- List of Mexican-American communities
- List of U.S. cities with large Hispanic populations
- USS Fresno, 3 ships
