= 2020 Fresno mayoral election =

- March 3, 2020
- Turnout: 40.29%
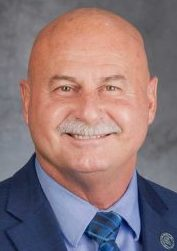

Candidate	Jerry Dyer	Andrew Janz
Party	Nonpartisan	Nonpartisan
Popular vote	50,914	39,430
Percentage	51.56%	39.93%
Mayor before election
Lee Brand
Republican
Elected mayor
Jerry Dyer
Republican

The 2020 Fresno mayoral election was held on March 3, 2020, to elect the mayor of Fresno, California. Republican Jerry Dyer was elected after winning a majority in the primary.

Incumbent mayor Lee Brand did not run for a second term. It was the first time in the city's history in which an incumbent eligible for re-election chose to retire the seat.

Municipal elections are officially nonpartisan; candidates' party affiliations do not appear on the ballot. However, a few candidates had, either previously or during their campaigns, publicly affiliated with political parties. Jerry Dyer identified as a Republican, Andrew Janz identified as a Democrat, and Nickolas Wildstar identified as a Libertarian.

== Candidates ==
=== Declared ===
- Jerry Dyer, former Fresno Chief of Police
- Bill Gates, immigrant and businessman
- Floyd Harris Jr., civil rights activist and pastor
- Andrew Janz, county prosecutor and candidate for California's 22nd congressional district in 2018
- Brian Jefferson, homeless advocate
- Richard Renteria, former insurance broker and candidate for mayor in 2016
- Nickolas Wildstar, political activist, rapper, and candidate for governor in 2018 and Fullerton City Council in 2018

=== Withdrew ===
- Elliot Balch, operations officer of the Central Valley Community Foundation
- Luis Chavez, city council member

=== Declined ===
- Lee Brand, incumbent mayor

== Endorsements ==
Jerry Dyer (R)

County officials

- Buddy Mendes, supervisor
- Lisa Smittcamp, district attorney

Organizations

- Fresno Police Officers' Association
Floyd Harris Jr.

Individuals

- Kimberly Williams, college professor and candidate for U.S. House in 2020

Organizations

- Democratic Socialists of America
Andrew Janz (D)

Newspapers

- The Fresno Bee

Organizations

- Fresno County Democratic Party
- National Association of Letter Carriers

== Polling ==
Poll source	Date(s) administered	Sample size	Margin of error	Lee Brand (R)	Jerry Dyer (R)	Andrew Janz (D)	Other / Undecided
GV Wire	January 4, 2020	500	± 4.0%	–	45%	47%	8% (Note: Undecided 8%)
GV Wire	April 18–16, 2019	300	± 6.0%	47%	–	53%	–
GV Wire	April 18–16, 2019	300	± 6.0%	24%	39%	37%	–
GV Wire	April 18–16, 2019	300	± 6.0%	18%	31%	26%	25% (Note: Some Other Democrat 15%, Some Other Republican 10%)

== Results ==
Since Dyer won a majority in the initial round of voting, no runoff needed to be held. If one had been required, it would have taken place on November 3, 2020.

2020 Fresno mayoral election
Candidate	Votes	%
Jerry Dyer	50,914	51.56
Andrew Janz	39,430	39.93
Floyd Harris Jr.	2,262	2.29
Bill Gates	2,262	2.29
Richard Renteria	2,076	2.10
Nickolas Wildstar	1,284	1.30
Brian Jefferson	510	0.52
Total votes	98,738	100.00

== See also ==
- 2020 California elections
