= 2024 Fresno mayoral election =

- March 5, 2024
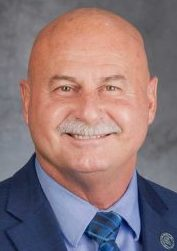

Candidate	Jerry Dyer	James Barr	Samantha Dussell
Party	Nonpartisan	Nonpartisan	Nonpartisan
Popular vote	55,872	9,910	4,046
Percentage	80.01%	14.19%	5.79%
Mayor before election
Jerry Dyer
Republican
Elected mayor
Jerry Dyer
Republican

The 2024 Fresno mayoral election was held on March 5, 2024, to elect the mayor of Fresno, California. Republican Jerry Dyer was re-elected after winning a majority in the primary.

== Candidates ==
=== Declared ===
- James Barr, teacher (Democratic)
- Samantha Dussell, stay-at-home mom (No party preference)
- Jerry Dyer (Republican), incumbent mayor

=== Withdrawn ===
- Lourin Hubbard, operations manager at the California Department of Water Resources and runner-up for California's 22nd congressional district in the 2022 special election (Democratic)

== Endorsements ==
Jerry Dyer (R)

State legislators

- Jim Patterson, state assemblymember from the 8th district (2012–present) and former mayor of Fresno (1993–2001)

Local officials

- Garry Bredefeld, Fresno city councilmember from the 6th district
- Mike Karbassi, Fresno city councilmember from the 2nd district
- Lisa Smittcamp, Fresno County District Attorney

Organizations

- California Apartment Association
- Fresno Association of Realtors
- Fresno Chamber of Commerce
- Fresno City Employees Association
- Fresno Police Officers Association

Labor unions

- Amalgamated Transit Union Local 1027
- Fresno, Madera, Tulare, Kings Building Trades Council
- International Association of Fire Fighters Local 202
- Carpenters Local 701

== Results ==
Since Dyer won a majority in the initial round of voting, no runoff needed to be held. If one was required, it would have taken place on November 5, 2024.

2024 Fresno mayoral election
Candidate	Votes	%
Jerry Dyer (incumbent)	55,872	80.01
James Barr	9,910	14.19
Samantha Dussell	4,046	5.79
Total votes	69,828	100.00

== See also ==
- 2024 California elections
