= 2000 Fresno mayoral election =

Fresno mayoral election, 2000
- March 7, 2000 (first round); November 7, 2000 (runoff)
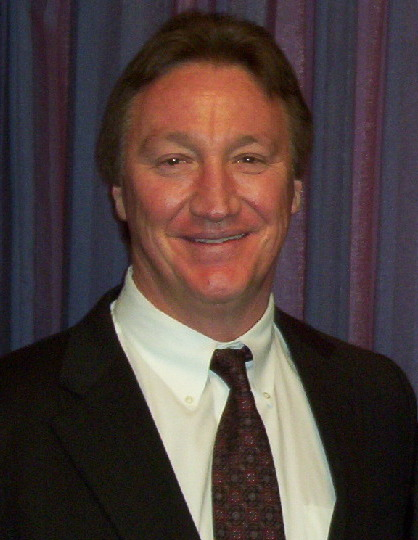

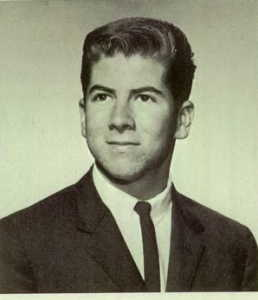

Candidate	Alan Autry	Dan Whitehurst	Chris Mathys
Party	Republican	Democratic	Nonpartisan
First-round vote	22,951	22,177	10,503
First-round percentage	28.75%	27.78%	13.16%
Second-round vote	66,555	41,920
Second-round percentage	61.23%	38.57%
Candidate	Garry Bredefeld	Daniel Ronquillo	Sal Quintero
Party	Nonpartisan	Nonpartisan	Nonpartisan
First-round vote	10,029	7,929	5,046
First-round percentage	12.56%	9.93%	6.32%
Mayor before election
Jim Patterson
Republican
Elected mayor
Alan Autry
Republican

The 2000 Fresno mayoral election was held on March 8, 2000, and November 7, 2000, to elect the mayor of Fresno, California. It saw the election of Alan Autry.

Incumbent mayor Jim Patterson was term limited.

== Results ==
=== First round ===
First round results
Candidate	Votes	%
Alan Autry	22,951	28.75
Dan Whitehurst	22,177	27.78
Chris Mathys	10,503	13.16
Garry Bredefeld	10,029	12.56
Daniel Ronquillo	7,929	9.93
Sal Quintero	5,046	6.32
Chris Petersen	699	0.88
Benjerman J. Raya	214	0.27
Michael Eagles	203	0.25
Write-ins	86	0.11
Total votes	79,837	

=== Runoff results ===
Runoff results
Candidate	Votes	%
Alan Autry	66,555	61.23
Dan Whitehurst	41,920	38.57
Write-ins	214	0.20
Total votes	108,689	
