= Delotto =

Delotto or DeLotto is a surname. Notable people with the surname include:

- Bert Delotto (1919–1991), American politician
- Mike DeLotto (1912–1983), American football coach
