= Wallace Henderson =

American politician

Wallace D. Henderson
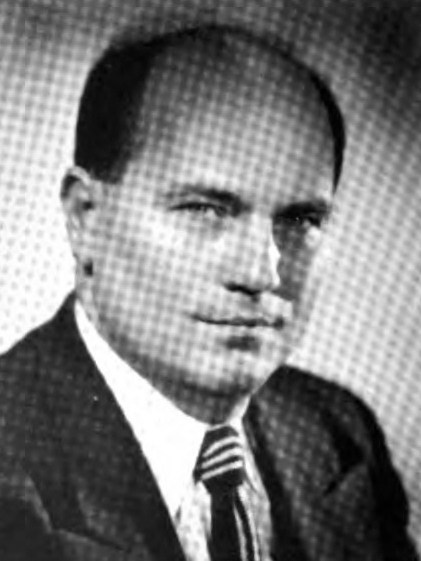
- Official portrait, 1954

16th Mayor of Fresno
- In office December 10, 1963 – April 19, 1965
- Preceded by: Arthur L. Selland
- Succeeded by: Floyd H. Hyde

Member of the California State Assembly
- In office January 8, 1951 – January 5, 1959
- Preceded by: James G. Crichton
- Succeeded by: Bert Delotto
- Constituency: 34th district (1951–1953); 32nd district (1953–1959)

Personal details
- Born: Wallace Dalrymple Henderson; May 18, 1912 Chicago, Illinois, U.S.
- Died: January 31, 1983 (aged 70) Fresno, California, U.S.
- Party: Democratic
- Spouse: Esther Lauder (m.1940-1977) d.1977
- Children: 2
- Education: Fresno State Normal School (BA Phil. and Psych.)

Wallace Dalrymple Henderson was a California politician, serving in the California State Assembly, Fresno City Council, and as acting mayor of Fresno immediately following the death of Mayor Arthur L. Selland.

Henderson was born on May 18, 1912, to Norman Batty Henderson and Mary Elizabeth Dalrymple in Chicago, Illinois, the first of three children. The son of a minister, Henderson and family moved during the early years of his life traveling from Chicago to Minneapolis and eventually settling in Fresno. Here he attended and graduated in 1932 from Fresno High School. During high school, he took an early interest in oratory and politics by serving on the Associated Student Body along with another future Fresno mayor Gordon Dunn. Henderson served as the Commissioner of Debating and was a part of several plays throughout high school. He attended Fresno State Normal School graduating in 1937 with a dual major in Philosophy and Psychology.

Henderson began work in union offices starting as a secretary and moving to vice-president of the Distillery & Wine Workers International Union, which is today a part of UFCW.

== Political career ==
=== California State Assembly ===
In 1950, Henderson ran for the California State Assembly representing the city of Fresno in what was then Assembly District 34, which eventually moved to the 32nd district, and served in the assembly from 1951 to 1959. During his time in the assembly, he fought against the establishment of the Kings River Conservation District and power generation at Pine Flat Dam as well as the taxation of cities that may encroach into the district boundaries. He co-sponsored the California Fair Employment Practices Act, which was an anti-discrimination law and a precursor to the Civil Rights Act of 1964.

Henderson left the union and became a teacher at Fresno Junior College, and then Fresno State College.

=== City council ===
After leaving the State Assembly, Henderson ran for Fresno City Council in April 1958 and was elected. He was pro-growth and pro-annexation. Along with fellow councilmember and future Fresno mayor Ted C. Wills, he worked to overrule or dismantle development plans that would slow city expansion, size, and density. Also during his time on the council, Henderson and fellow councilmembers worked on the route and direction of the Fresno freeway system including SR 41, SR 180, and SR 168. He voiced opposition to the initial location of SR 41, which would have carved through Huntington Boulevard Neighborhood. He also led the opposition to remove other tree-lined streets in Fresno, including North Fulton Street heading out of Downtown Fresno.

=== Mayor ===
Henderson was appointed interim Fresno mayor after the death of Arthur L. Selland. As mayor, Henderson saw the groundbreaking and construction of the Fulton Mall which turned a six-block portion of the city's central business district into a pedestrian-only mall. He voiced support for the city to retain its bus transit system, today known as FAX; other councilmembers had called for its elimination. The city took over service in 1961 from National City Lines and was running a deficit that the council wanted to stop. Henderson noted that the bus system was indispensable for the city. He supported the continued progression on equal and fair housing and employment. He was joined by Rev. Martin Luther King Jr. at a march in Fresno to show solidarity and support for these causes.

In December 1964, Henderson chose to not seek a full term as mayor, which allowed for an open race for the mayoralty.

In 1970, Henderson attempted a comeback election to take control of his old State Assembly seat, now considered Assembly District 32. He lost the race to Kenneth L. Maddy.

Political offices
Preceded by Arthur L. Selland	16th Mayor of Fresno; 1963-1965	Succeeded by Floyd H. Hyde
