= 2016 Fresno mayoral election =

Fresno mayoral election, 2016
- June 7, 2016 (first round); November 8, 2016 (runoff)
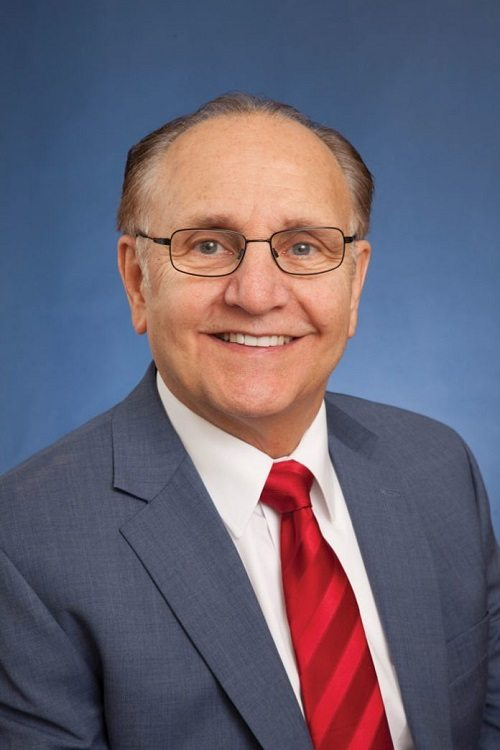

Candidate	Lee Brand	Henry R. Perea	H. Spees
Party	Nonpartisan	Nonpartisan	Nonpartisan
First-round vote	25,491	37,006	15,089
First-round percentage	30.79%	44.70%	18.23%
Second-round vote	71,776	68,053
Second-round percentage	51.20%	48.54%
Mayor before election
Ashley Swearengin
Republican
Elected mayor
Lee Brand
Republican

The 2016 Fresno mayoral election was held on June 6, 2016 and November 8, 2016 to elect the mayor of Fresno, California. It saw the election of Lee Brand.

Municipal elections in California are officially non-partisan.

Incumbent mayor Ashley Swearengin was term-limited.

== Results ==
=== First round ===
First round results
Candidate	Votes	%
Henry R. Perea	37,006	44.70
Lee Brand	25,491	30.79
H. Spees	15,089	18.23
Doug Vagim	2,910	3.52
Richard B. Renteria	2,090	2.52
Write-ins	199	0.24
Total votes	69,795	

=== Runoff results ===
Runoff results
Candidate	Votes	%
Lee Brand	71,776	51.20
Henry R. Perea	68,053	48.54
Write-ins	363	0.26
Total votes	140,192	
