= C. Cal Evans =

American politician (1905-1971)

14th Mayor of Fresno, California
- In office April 22, 1957 – April 21, 1958
- Preceded by: Gordon Dunn
- Succeeded by: Arthur L. Selland

Personal details
- Born: Charles Calvin Evans; May 23, 1905; Pawnee City, Nebraska, U.S.
- Died: April 24, 1971 (aged 65); Fresno, California, U.S.
- Political party: Non-Party
- Spouse: Irma Lee Webb

Charles Calvin Evans was a real estate agent and Fresno mayor for 364 days from April 22, 1957, to April 21, 1958. As of 2020, Evans term as mayor of Fresno, California is the shortest term not resulting from succession appointment in the city's history.

C. Cal Evans was born May 23, 1905, to Elijah Charles Evans and Sarah Elizabeth McConnaughey. Evans was the third of four children for father Elijah and ninth of ten children for mother Sarah who previously was widowed. Before age 5, Evans and his family had moved west to Chino, California where he was raised. Evans moved to Fresno in 1936 and became a real estate and insurance agent selling primarily residential properties.

== Political career ==
In April 1953, Evans was elected to the Fresno City commission. Under a City commission government, each council commissioner was responsible for other departments for the city and roles were distributed by individual seats. As Fresno grew to over 100,000 residents, the city commission system was being taxed by the amount of requests for commissioners had for each of their multiple departments. Shortly after taking office in 1953, Evans and the city commission set out on creating the Municipal charter that would allow for a Council–manager government with a city manager that had department heads for each department that answered to the city manager and ultimately the city council.

In April 1957, Evans ran and was elected mayor. As mayor under City commission government, the mayor was responsible for public safety which included police, fire, and medical services. Evans term was noted for the physical adoption, creation, and public vote of the updated municipal charter which evolved the Fresno City Commission into the Fresno City Council.

During this time, Evans was embroiled in controversy when Fresno Police Chief H. R. Morton accused him of inhibiting the vice squad in combating prostitution throughout Fresno This came to light in an investigative report by The Fresno Bee that noted that Evans had even gone so far as to suggest controlled prostitution. Further details revealed prostitution was expanding on a massive scale to the point that Fresno was described as a "wide open city" in which vice went unchecked. Evans denied that prostitution was occurring at all in Fresno. This resulted in a commission inquiry in December 1957 as to the situation of prostitution and vice.

On April 8, 1958, the Fresno voters were asked to vote for the new councilmembers, mayor, and adopt the new city charter. Mayor C. Cal Evans lost to Arthur Selland in a field of eight candidates.

== Post career ==
Evans returned to real estate business after losing the mayoral election. Evans voiced support for 1964 California Proposition 14 which nullified the Rumford Fair Housing Act by attempting to re-legalize discrimination by allowing "absolute discretion" in whether the landlord or property owner may or may not allow a real estate sale to go through. Voters approved this statewide and in Fresno until the California Supreme Court and the United States Supreme Court ruled it unconstitutional.

== Death ==
Evans died April 24, 1971, of a heart attack.

Political offices
Preceded by Gordon Dunn	14th Mayor of Fresno; 1957-1958	Succeeded by Arthur L. Selland
