= Ted Wills =

American baseball player (1934-2025)

- Pitcher
- Born: February 9, 1934; Fresno, California, U.S.
- Died: March 7, 2025 (aged 91)
- Batted: Left Threw: Left

MLB debut
- May 24, 1959, for the Boston Red Sox

Last MLB appearance
- June 12, 1965, for the Chicago White Sox

MLB statistics
- Win–loss record: 8–11
- Earned run average: 5.46
- Strikeouts: 133
- Stats at Baseball Reference

Teams
- Boston Red Sox (1959–1962); Cincinnati Reds (1962); Chicago White Sox (1965)

Theodore Carl Wills Jr. (February 9, 1934 — March 7, 2025) was an American former professional baseball pitcher. He played all or part of five seasons in Major League Baseball (MLB) for the Boston Red Sox, Cincinnati Reds and Chicago White Sox between 1959 and 1965.

== Biography ==
Wills attended Fresno State University. He batted left-handed and threw left-handed, and he was listed at 6 feet 2 inches (1.88 m) and 200 pounds (91 kg).

The Boston Red Sox signed Wills in 1955 to his first professional contract. After a four full years in the minors, he made his major-league debut on May 24, 1959. Over parts of four seasons with the Red Sox, he appeared in 42 games pitched, won six, lost nine and posted a 6.09 earned run average (ERA). He recorded two complete games as a starting pitcher; both occurred during his rookie 1959 campaign.

On May 8, 1962, the Cincinnati Reds purchased Wills' contract from the Red Sox. After spending the 1963 and 1964 seasons in the minor leagues with the San Diego Padres, the Chicago White Sox acquired Wills from the Reds before the 1965 season. He was released in June, and pitched in the Cleveland Indians and St. Louis Cardinals organizations before the end of the season, his last as a professional.

Overall in his major-league career, Wills went 8–11 with a 5.46 ERA. Perhaps his best major-league season was his last—in 1965, he appeared in 15 games and had an ERA of 2.84. At the plate, Wills was a solid batter—in 44 career at-bats, he hit .250 with three career doubles. Fielding was not his best asset—he had a .911 career fielding percentage, committing four career errors. Wills played his final major-league game on June 12, 1965. Throughout his career, Wills was used mostly as a reliever, appearing in 83 total games, starting 13, and working in 186 1/3 innings pitched. He allowed 210 hits and 97 bases on balls, with 133 strikeouts. He was more successful as a reliever, compiling a 6–4 career record as a reliever, with five saves and a 5.17 ERA.

Wills' father, Theodore Carl Wills Sr., was mayor of Fresno, California, from 1969 to 1977.

Wills died March 7, 2025.
