= Z. S. Leymel =

American politician

Zygmunt S. Leymel
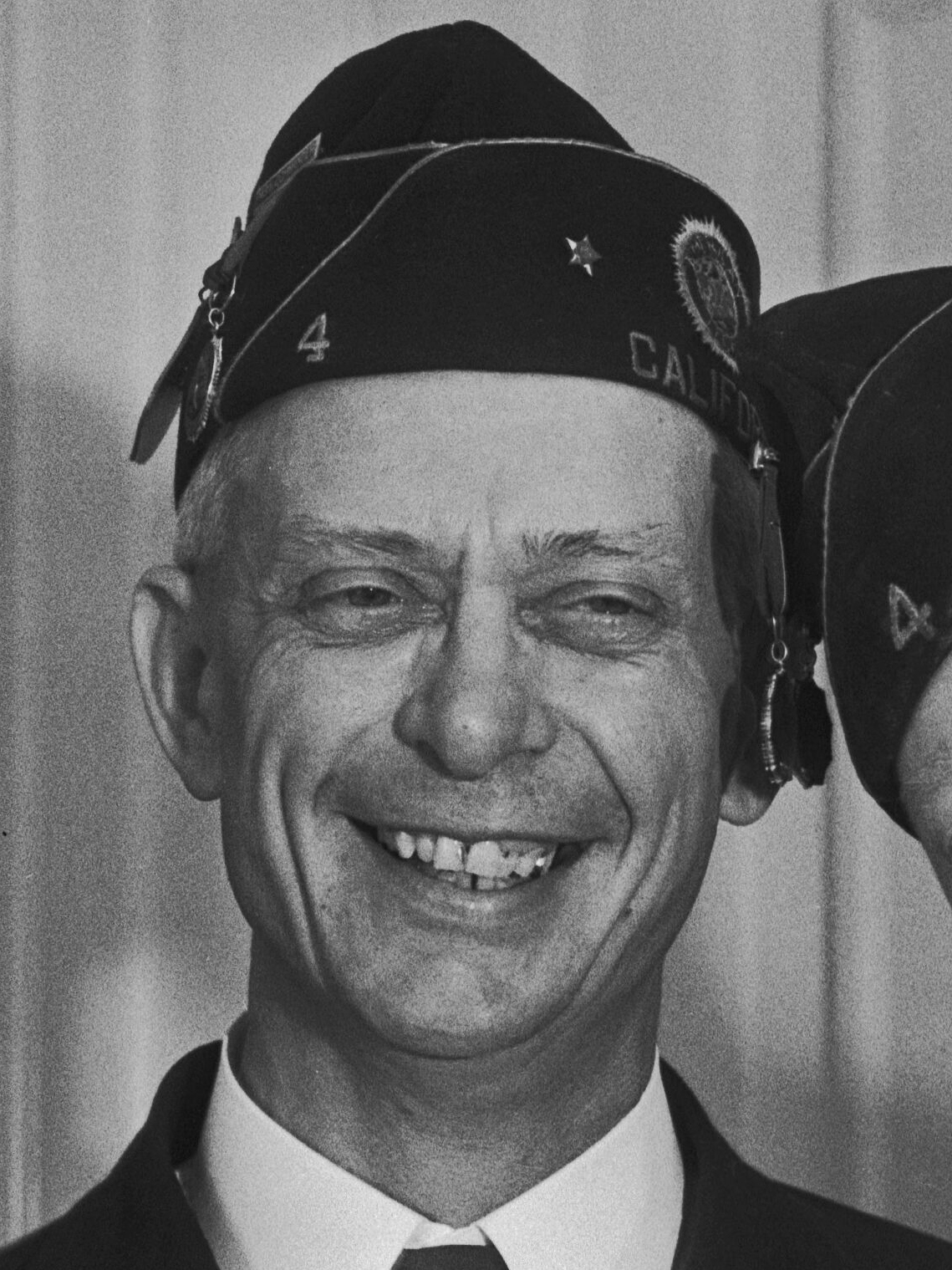
- Leymel in 1935

9th and 11th Mayor of Fresno
- In office April 22, 1929 – April 26, 1937
- Preceded by: A. E. Sunderland
- Succeeded by: Frank A. Homan
- In office April 28, 1941 – May 9, 1947
- Preceded by: Frank A. Homan
- Succeeded by: Glenn M. DeVore

Member of the California State Assembly from the 51st district
- In office January 3, 1927 – April 22, 1929
- Preceded by: Herbert McDowell
- Succeeded by: Sarah E. Kellogg

Personal details
- Born: Zygmunt Siegfried Leymel; November 27, 1883 Wilkes-Barre, Pennsylvania, U.S.
- Died: May 9, 1947 (aged 63) Fresno, California, U.S.
- Party: Republican
- Spouse: Marie Juanita Beckwith (m.1908-1941) d.1941
- Education: University of Pennsylvania (BS)

Military service
- Allegiance: United States of America
- Branch/service: United States Army
- Years of service: 1898, 1917–1918
- Rank: Major
- Unit: 1st United States Volunteer Cavalry Regiment, 91st Division
- Battles/wars: Spanish–American War: Battle of Kettle Hill; World War I: Battle of the Lys and the Escaut; Meuse–Argonne offensive

Zygmunt Siegfried Leymel (November 27, 1883 – May 9, 1947) was a teacher, veteran of the Spanish–American War and World War I where he served in the United States Army, California State legislator, and served two sets of non-consecutive terms as mayor of Fresno.

== Early life and career ==
Leymel was born November 27, 1883, to Thomas A. Leymel and Caroline Ropcewicz in Wilkes-Barre, Pennsylvania, the second of two children. Leymel's parents were immigrants from Austrian Poland. Leymel was born and remained nearby, graduating from Wilkes-Barre High School in 1902, where Leymel was heavily involved in music and drama. Leymel attended the University of Pennsylvania and competed in fencing before graduating in 1909. He moved west to Seattle, Washington to become a teacher. Leymel married Maria Beckwith in Seattle on January 25, 1908, where the two lived until moving to Fresno in 1913 to teach civics and history at Fresno High School.

== Military service ==
=== Spanish–American War ===
Leymel left home at age 14 in April 1898 to fight in the Spanish–American War. This is where Leymel joined the 1st United States Volunteer Cavalry Regiment and become an orderly for Theodore Roosevelt. Leymel was at the Battle of Kettle Hill where he and Roosevelt were fired upon and Roosevelt returned fire killing the Spanish Army soldier that had shot. Leymel served the duration of the war alongside Roosevelt and returned home at the end of 1898.

=== World War I ===
When the U.S. entered World War I, Leymel finished out teaching in the 1916–1917 school year before resigning to re-enlist in the U.S. Army. Leymel reported to the Presidio of San Francisco for officer training and was stationed at Camp Kearny before being sent to Europe. Leymel served in an artillery unit of the 91st Division and see action in northern France and southern Belgium in the Meuse–Argonne offensive

Once home from the war, Leymel resumed teaching at Fresno High School including leading the JROTC program. In 1919, Leymel was vice-marshal of the first Veterans Day Parade in Fresno which as of 2019 is the oldest continuous parade in the United States west of the Mississippi River. Leymel also led the a local American Legion post from 1919-1926 until he resigned to run for assembly.

== Political career ==
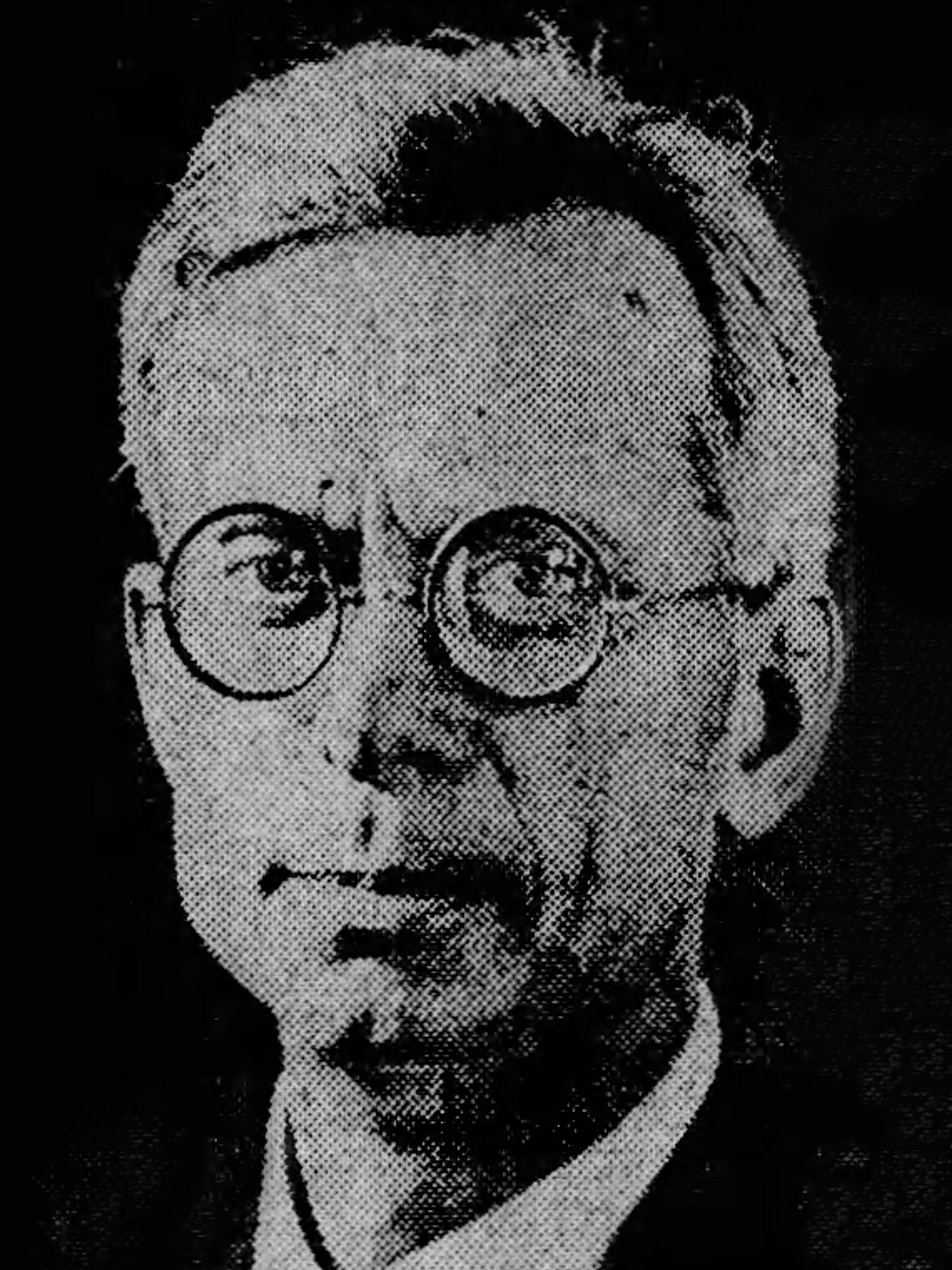
Leymel as a candidate for Assembly in 1926.

=== California State Assembly ===
Leymel ran in 1926 to represent Fresno in the California State Assembly. Leymel won the Republican primary to face Democratic candidate Penn Cummings. Leymel went on to win the election. Along with fellow assembly members and California State Superintendent of Public Instruction and former Fresno City Schools Superintendent William John Cooper, he passed legislation to further streamline public education instruction with the Curriculum Development and Supplemental Materials Commission (today known as Instructional Quality Commission). Leymel also pusedh for the creation of an Appellate District for inland California. Leymel created controversy throughout his time in the Assembly while serving both as an Assembly member and teacher which was considered conflicts of interest. Nevertheless, Leymel ran for re-election in 1928 and was re-elected to serve the next Assembly.

=== First mayoral term ===
Leymel entered the race for mayor after an increase in city milk prices caused by A. E. Sunderland's administration order that only milk from cows not infected with bovine tuberculosis be delivered in city limits. Leymel entered the race promising an open door policy for both supporters and opponents, a full review of the milk order, and small government. Sunderland supporters attempted to paint Leymel as beholden to a party boss from his dealings in the Assembly. Leymel won with 60% of the vote over Sunderland.

Leymel's election prompted Sunderland political appointments to resign en masse leaving Leymel with multiple empty committee seats. Leymel also was the target of two assassination attempts; one in September 1929 and another on Black Monday 1929.

Leymel's first term was defined by infighting between the city commissioners, the mayor, and city department heads. Each city commissioner, which was the precursor to the city councilmember, had differing opinions in how and where the city needed to head at the start of the Great Depression with some favoring municipal takeover of utilities others favoring additional franchising opportunities, and others wanting additional fines for bootlegging. Leymel even went so far as to have a secret vice fund where he paid private detectives to find, arrest and fine bootleggers. Once discovered, the other commissioners seized the funding and shutdown the operation Initially, Leymel wanted electric, heating gas, and water brought under the city as city owned utilities however, only water was approved and made a municipal service.

Another major contentious issue was the Fresno Fire Department and in particular the consumption of alcohol while both on duty and during Prohibition. Leymel, being the both mayor and commissioner of public safety and welfare, was delivered a case where three firefighters were found intoxicated on duty. After review Leymel fired one and placed the other two on administrative leave. The other city commissioners demanded that all of them be fired and those previously found to be intoxicated on duty at any other previous time be fired as well, which after investigation nearly eliminated the entire department.

Leymel won a second term as mayor in 1933, becoming the first mayor of Fresno to be elected to serve another term.

=== Second mayoral term ===
With the assistance from the New Deal programs, Leymel, along with Public Works Director Jean Vincenz, were instrumental in the construction of several projects that defined Fresno during the Great Depression including the Fresno Municipal Sanitary Landfill, which is the first modern landfill in history, the Belmont Avenue Traffic Circle and Subway, which represents the first grade separated rail crossing in California and one of the first traffic circles west of the Mississippi River, and the expansion of the Fresno Chandler Executive Airport which resulted in Fresno becoming home to Hammer Field. Vincenz and Leymel also widened Broadway Street through Downtown Fresno along with the construction of the Belmont Avenue Traffic Circle and Subway to allow for continued flow of traffic along U.S. Route 99. Leymel is also credited for overseeing the purchase of Camp Fresno located near Dinkey Creek in the Sierra Nevada Mountains approximately 65 miles NE of Fresno.

During his second term, Leymel created and headed a tour of western cities by airplane to promote wine consumption in Las Vegas, San Francisco, Los Angeles, Boulder City, Reno, and Salt Lake City

Leymel also continued to the fight against Pacific Telephone and Telegraph, San Joaquin Light and Power, and Pacific Gas and Electric to lower rates, take over the local utilities, or create a public option for these utilities. This resulted in a push before the voters of a public takeover of San Joaquin Light and Power company as a municipal power agency. Leymel's proposal was defeated soundly by voters and resulted in Leymel losing his campaign for a third consecutive term in 1937 to Frank A. Homan.

=== 1938 gubernatorial race ===
Leymel announced shortly after losing the Fresno mayor's race his decision to seek the Republican nomination for California Governor in opposition to the incumbent Governor Frank Merriam. Leymel attacked Merriam about his tax increases as a means of balancing the state budget during the Great Depression. Leymel also indicated he would eliminate state bureau redundancy while boosting farming. Leymel lost the primary by finishing last in a field of five with Merriam winning. Merriam went on to lose the 1938 gubernatorial race to Culbert Olson.

=== Third and fourth mayoral terms ===
After an unsuccessful gubernatorial run and a successful election to the Fresno City Schools board of education, Leymel sought in April 1941 to run again for Fresno mayor against the incumbent and individual he lost the 1937 election, Mayor Frank A. Homan. Homan went into this election in a weakened position due to a significant rate increase in city taxes unlike Leymel who was known from his prior administration for reducing city taxes while providing more services.

Early in his new term, Leymel led the earliest efforts at historic preservation in Fresno County in order to save the original Fresno County Courthouse at Millerton from being inundated by waters collected by the building of Friant Dam along the San Joaquin River

The majority of Leymel's third term was consumed by local defense efforts due to the U.S. preparing and entering World War II. He served as the local defense and preparedness coordinator which including organizing merchants for air raid blackouts, Boy Scout units to collect metal, and defense drills for the city schools. Leymel also continued the push for a military base to be in Fresno which resulted in Hammer Field being built in 1942. Leymel also started a campaign to crack down on prostitution in the city after receiving threats from military base commanders in the city that they would intervene if the brothels continued to operate freely. Leymel also began work on a memorial park at the corner of Broadway Street and Divisadero Street to honor U.S. military personnel for Battle of Bataan and Corregidor

Leymel won a fourth term in April 1945 over California State Senator Hugh M. Burns. His fourth term continued to see more assistance on the home front with regards to the World War II. This included the location and early site planning and work for the Veterans' Administration Medical Center. Leymel recommended and approved the hiring of the first African-American for the Fresno Police Department in July 1945. Leymel also saw the official launch of USS Fresno (CL-121).

== Death ==
Leymel was diagnosed with cancer in early 1947 which required two operations to remove. The second surgery resulted in complications and Leymel being hospitalized for two weeks. His condition worsened and he passed on May 9, 1947. Leymel is one of only two mayors of Fresno to receive a public municipal funeral service. The service was conducted in full military honors however was coordinated and managed by the City of Fresno. Over 2,000 people including local and state dignitaries, fellow veterans, city staff, and members of the public attended his service.

== Legacy ==
Leymel is honored by the smallest park in Fresno at the corner of Divisadero Street and Broadway Street where U.S. 99 turns off of Broadway Street towards the Belmont Avenue Traffic Circle and Subway leading out of town. This park was originally the same park sought by Leymel to honor servicemembers for Bataan and Corregidor.

At 5,126 days, Leymel is the longest serving mayor of Fresno including the current mayoral system and previous president of the board of city trustees that existed between 1885 and 1901.

Political offices
Preceded by A. E. Sunderland	9th Mayor of Fresno; 1929–1937	Succeeded by Frank A. Homan
Preceded by Frank A. Homan	11th Mayor of Fresno; 1941–1947	Succeeded by Glenn M. DeVore (acting)
