= Jerry Dyer =

American politician

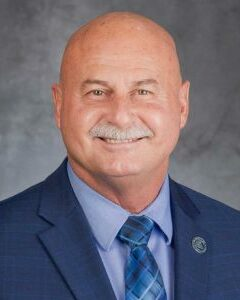
- Official portrait, 2021

26th Mayor of Fresno
- Incumbent
- Assumed office January 5, 2021
- Preceded by: Lee Brand

21st Chief of Police of Fresno
- In office August 1, 2001 – October 16, 2019
- Mayor: Alan Autry; Ashley Swearengin; Lee Brand
- Preceded by: Ed Winchester
- Succeeded by: Andy Hall

Personal details
- Born: Jerry Phillip Dyer; May 3, 1959 (age 67) Fresno, California, U.S.
- Party: Republican
- Spouse: Diane Gonzales (m. 1980)
- Education: California State University, Fresno (BS); California State Polytechnic University, Pomona (MS)

Jerry Phillip Dyer (born May 3, 1959) is an American politician and former law enforcement officer. He is the 26th and current mayor of Fresno, California. Previously, he served as the chief of the Fresno Police Department.

== Life and career ==
Dyer was born in Fresno to Donald Dyer and Anna Rackley on May 3, 1959. The Dyers relocated to Fowler, California, in 1964. He attended and graduated from Fowler High School in 1977. While in high school, Dyer played on the varsity football, baseball, and basketball teams. After high school, Dyer joined the College of the Sequoias police officer training academy and was sworn in as an officer of the Fresno Police Department on May 1, 1979, under then Police Chief George K. Hansen. Later his father and sister, Diana, would join Jerry in at the Fresno Police Department with his father previously serving in the Madera County Sheriffs Department. He served as a police officer in the Fresno Police Department for 22 years while rising through the ranks before being named chief of police in 2001.

In 1985, Dyer was involved in an extra-marital relationship with a 16 year old minor. The accusations were never made public, and internal investigations led to no criminal charges against Dyer. According to an anonymous police source, Dyer admitted to having sex with the minor. In a 2001 Fresno Bee interview, Dyer refused to talk about the allegations, replying, “All I can tell you is that the relationships that I have had outside of my marriage, when I was a young man, have been dealt with. ... God’s forgiven me. My wife’s forgiven me. This department’s forgiven me and looked into a lot of things in my past.”

In 2011, deputy chiefs Robert Nevarez and Sharon Shaffer filed a lawsuit against Dyer. He was accused of creating a hostile work environment in the Fresno Police Department through making several racially and sexually insensitive comments. Fresno City Hall settled the lawsuit, paying $200,000 collectively to Nevarez and Shaffer. Dyer also was questioned by the media for neglectful supervision of his chief deputy who was convicted in 2017 of conspiring to distribute heroin and marijuana of which Dyer claimed he was unaware.

Dyer served as police chief for 18 years. He ran in the March 2020 election to succeed Lee Brand as mayor. He received a majority of the vote, bypassing the need for a runoff election. Dyer is the second former Fresno police chief to run for mayor and be elected after Mayor Truman G. Hart.

Dyer and his wife, Diane, have two children.

== Electoral history ==
2020 Fresno mayoral election
Candidate	Votes	%
Jerry Dyer	50,914	51.56
Andrew Janz	39,430	39.93
Floyd D. Harris Jr.	2,262	2.29
Bill Gates	2,262	2.29
Richard B. Renteria	2,076	2.10
Nicolas Wildstar	1,284	1.30
Brian E. Jefferson	510	0.5
Total votes	98,738	100
Turnout	{{{votes}}}	39.38%

Political offices
Preceded by Lee Brand	Mayor of Fresno; 2021–present	Incumbent
