= A. E. Sunderland =

American politician (1866–1940)

8th Mayor of Fresno
- In office April 27, 1925 – April 22, 1929
- Preceded by: Truman G. Hart
- Succeeded by: Z. S. Leymel

Personal details
- Born: Alpheus Eugene Sunderland; October 5, 1866 Pavilion, New York, U.S.
- Died: September 3, 1940 (aged 73) Los Angeles, California, U.S.
- Party: Republican
- Spouse: Lillian May Gilliam (m. 1889–1940)
- Children: Leroy Sunderland; Mabel Sunderland; Hazel May Boone; Ninetta "Nan" Sunderland; Lillian Schroder

Alpheus "Al" Eugene Sunderland (1866–1940) was an American banker, businessman, movie star manager, Woodman, Rotarian, city trustee, and mayor of Fresno. Sunderland is the father of actress Ninette "Nan" Sunderland.

Sunderland was born on October 5, 1866, to Edwin Riley Sunderland and Mercy Cronkite in Pavilion, New York, the first of two children. The Sunderland Family would reside in the Pavilion area for several years before the family moved to Kansas City, Missouri. Sunderland began working at 15 years old indicating he completed school to the eighth grade before the family moved. Sunderland would begin as a billing clerk for Armour Packing Company where he learned business and accounting that would prove beneficial in later years. Sunderland would move again to Clovis, California, where Sunderland would get a job at the Fresno Flume and Irrigation Company. In 1889, Sunderland would marry Lillian May Gilliam and purchased land near Temperance Colony. An accident at the planing mill on site cost him his left eye and Sunderland was left without work just prior to the Panic of 1893. Sunderland was fortunate to have land and began practicing viticulture which allowed him to become familiar with other local grape and raisin growers of the area. Sunderland was heavily involved with the fraternal benefit society Woodmen of the World up to becoming the Consul Commander for the local lodge as well as the head banker for the Pacific Woodmen division of the society. Sunderland would bring his previous accounting experience and understanding of viticulture farming to start work for a packing house as their secretary. His work in the packing house, viticulture farming, and philanthropy with the Woodmen of the World would continue throughout his political offices.

== Civic career ==
=== City Board of Trustees ===
Sunderland would run in April 1905 as a Fresno City Board of Trustee, the precursor to the Fresno City Council, in the 7th Ward. Sunderland, along with several others on a unity ticket of good government with incumbent Mayor L. O. Stephens. The Stephens ticket was viewed as a continuance on the promise from the 1901 municipal election to clean up city streets and keep the local party bosses out of city hall. The election would be a mixed result where portions of the unity ticket, such as Sunderland, would win but Stephens would lose to W. Parker Lyon.

Trustee Sunderland fought for equal treatment of all parts of the city. The most notable event came from the growing mistreatment of the southern part of Fresno in which multiple ice production plants had been set up and allowed to build. These plants were allowed to run excess from ice production into the sewers causing houses in this part of the city to have sewage back ups or run into the streets causing flooding and standing water in the neighborhoods. Sunderland demanded that these plants must be held accountable for their actions and that the northern part of the city would never allow for this type of unsanitary conditions.

Sunderland would find himself at odds with the majority of board of trustees over the amount of liquor licenses in the city. The majority of the board trustees were in favor of restricting, regulating and even elimination of liquor establishments in the city. Trustee Sunderland, along with trustee J. Q. Anderson, and Mayor Lyon favored leaving the licenses alone. This would culminate in a board meeting in February 1908 where the board majority made a motion to cap the amount of liquor licenses in the city at 30 from the current 75 establishments with a license and raise the license fees from $400 (equivalent $11,265 in 2020) to $1000 (equivalent $28,163 in 2020). Sunderland and Anderson balked at this plan and being asked to be put on the record whether they wanted a "wet" or "dry" city in regards to liquor establishments then decided to resign rather than vote on the motion.

=== School Board ===
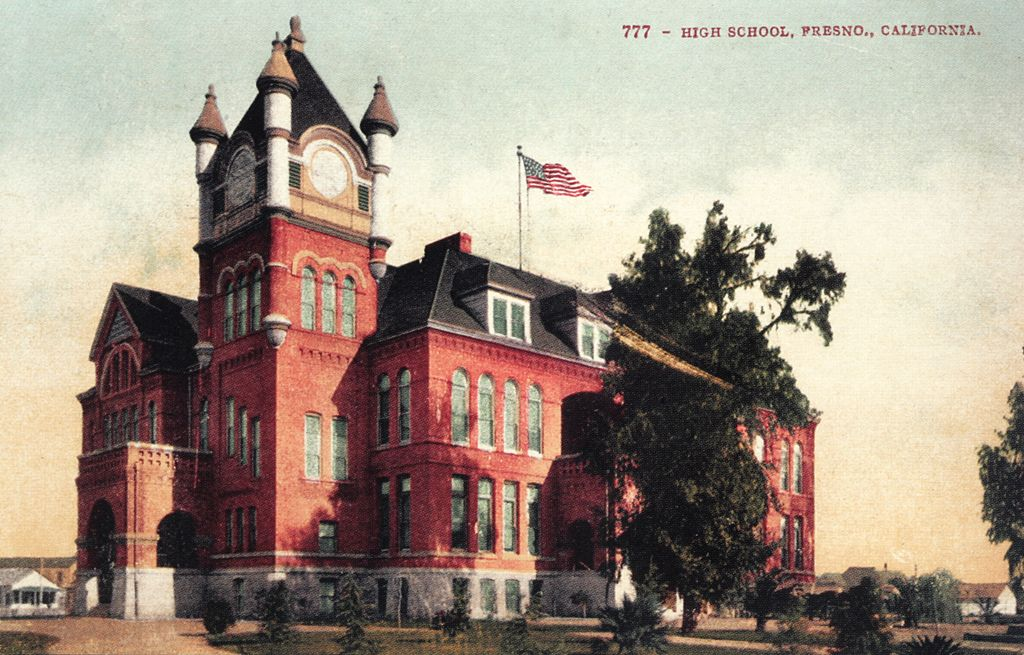
Colored Postcard of Fresno High School in 1896

After resignation, Sunderland continued to remain active in civic affairs including working to reestablish a group of residents to push for new playgrounds and better equipment at the current city parks. This committee was reformed at the request of Fresno City Schools superintendent C. L. McLane and then Mayor Alva E. Snow. Sunderland would return to the ballot in 1913 to run as Fresno City Board of Education President and win to succeed Frank A. Homan

One of the first situations that occurred for Sunderland was the expulsion of a high school senior for speaking publicly. Earl Wooster was expelled and denied graduation and a diploma for speaking critically in public about the unsafe conditions of Fresno High School Auditorium including its susceptibility to fire. Sunderland would demand an apology stating that problems existed but were worse at other schools. Wooster refused and Sunderland recommended expulsion to the board of education. The board would also hire the next superintendent for Fresno City Schools C. C. Starr to replace C. L. McLane who would step down to be president of Fresno State Normal School. As a result of the previous board and the speech by Wooster, the board would place a $450,000 bond before the voters to upgrade all school campuses and build a new school in the Arlington Heights neighborhood. The bonds would pass by more than 86% approval. The school board would issue bonds and make the necessary repairs to reopen the Fresno High auditorium for public use in less than two years from Wooster's speech.

Immediately after the bond approval, the school board revoked the building of the school in the Arlington Heights neighborhood in favor of sending the children of the area to other schools in order to concentrate students in larger groups in schools and to make sure that all schools are treated equitable to one another. Sunderland wrote the opinion of the board in the newspaper to state this as well as to note that Arlington Heights had multiple schools nearby including the near completion of the new Jackson Elementary School and creating a new school would only move to exclude rather than include students. Residents of the neighborhood became enraged and formed a recall effort of the entire school board After much heated debate, the board moved to construct a school to the north of Arlington Heights to accommodate both the current and future students of the area.

As World War I began, the school board noted that there became an increasing difficulty to get buyers for the school building bonds passed earlier in the year Sunderland proposed and the school board approved that they would issue bonds to the contractors that would build and construct the schools as payment and allow a lien to be placed against the buildings until the paid in full, an early form of leaseback. This new system allowed the schools to continue to build out as needed by the growing student population.

Sunderland would continue to advance the long term sustainability of school building and maintenance by going to Sacramento to speak to the California State Senate to pass a bill that would allow schools bonds to be tied to property taxes. This bill would be the first attempt to allow school districts to add to property taxes as a means of raising funds.

Sunderland would find that as he worked to secure funding for schools through bonds and laws, that the member of the board of education in charge of buildings was embezzling over $6,000 ($154,000 in 2020 dollars). H. T. Humphrey would be arrested for embezzlement which would prompt the board to appoint a new member to finish the term.

After leaving the school board, Sunderland would continue to work with the new board to secure and get voter approval for a $2,000,000 ($29,953,000 in 2020 dollars) bond that would finance what is the current site of Fresno High School along with improvements to multiple elementary schools. The city would approve these bonds would pass with nearly 90% of the vote.

=== Mayor ===
Sunderland became instrumental in the move to overhaul the city charter. He along with future mayor Frank A. Homan were part of the community of businessmen that crafted the new city charter to create a City commission government. The new charter eliminated the office of mayor replacing it as an ex-officio position, with the primary head of city government being devolved to five city commissioners each responsible for specific aspects of city governance. The ex-officio mayor was the Commissioner of Public Safety and Welfare who was responsible for the selection, hiring, and termination of the police and fire chiefs as well as lead and manage the city health department. After passing the new charter and the installation of the first administration under the new charter in 1921, Mayor Truman G. Hart recognized that the new charter was flawed without full cooperation of all commissioners. Hart attempted to establish this amongst the other commissioners however this would prove troublesome as the other commissioners argued for co-equal municipal power although Hart was the lead commissioner. Hart began to advocate for the charter to be amended to allow a city manager. Sunderland would run in April 1925 in opposition to the city manager proposal of the Hart administration stating that he would be able to unite the commission as needed to move the city and the commission forward. Sunderland won a five-way race for the Commissioner of Public Safety and Welfare position and the thus became the ex-officio mayor.

Sunderland would immediately become embroiled in scandal as a result of a criminal investigation of former interim chief of police Eugene Fornes. In December 1925, Fornes along with eleven officers were arrested and placed on trial for violating laws enforcing Prohibition. During the trial, the Fornes implicated Sunderland stating he was instructed by the mayor to manage the blind pigs by giving advanced warning to the establishment operators of pending raids, remove officers that had worked against Sunderland's election, and enforce fines. Fornes stated that Sunderland instructed him, "the town should not be choked to death, to permit vices to run and rotate in raiding them in order to get high fines to offset the high tax which the people were hollering about, and that he expected $60,000 from the police department in fines." Sunderland was ordered to testify before the court on these allegations in early 1926. Sunderland denied the allegations made by Fornes by stating that such ideas that had been suggested by others. Sunderland stated, "The only instruction I gave him on that score was this: Quit chasing the man around town with a bottle on his hip and quit breaking into homes where they are having wine with meals, but go after the commercialized bootlegger, the man who sells the stuff and cut out the source."

Although only implicated but never charged or indicted, Sunderland would face a recall effort spurred by Fresno voters and a new formed newspaper The Fresno Herald to remove him from the city commission and as the mayor. The Fresno Morning Republican which was another of Fresno's newspaper companies, would come out in defense of Sunderland. Sunderland would survive the recall effort in July 1926 allowing Sunderland to continue his mayoral term.

Sunderland also is credited at the time of appointing the first female police officer of the Fresno Police Department. Mrs. Sudie Stapleton was hired as the police matron and sworn in as an officer by Mayor Sunderland.

Political offices
Preceded by Truman G. Hart	8th Mayor of Fresno; 1925-1929	Succeeded by Z. S. Leymel
