= Herbert McDowell =

American politician

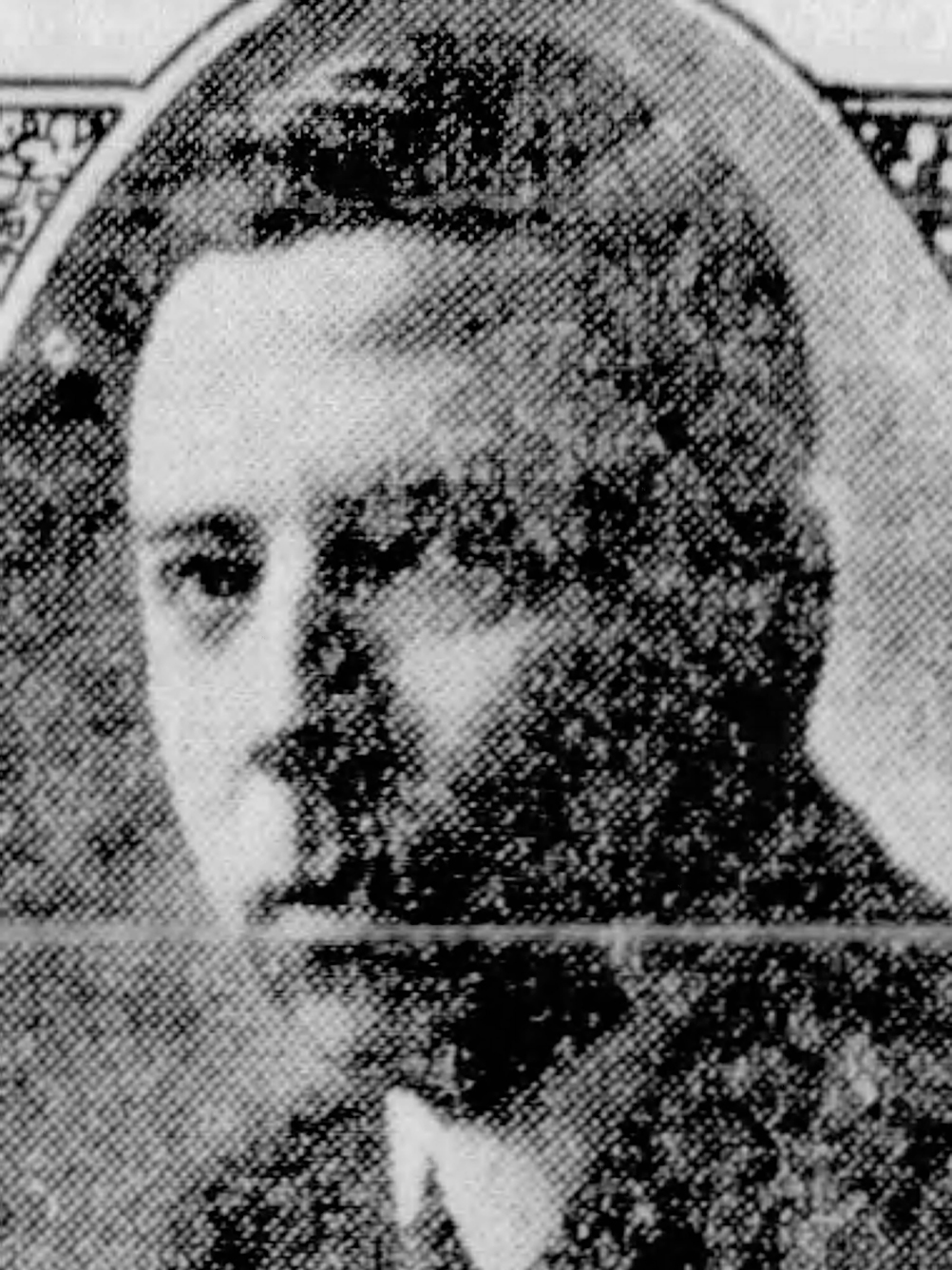
- McDowell in 1920

Member of the California State Assembly from the 51st district
- In office January 3, 1921 – January 3, 1927
- Preceded by: Sidney Lanier Strother
- Succeeded by: Z. S. Leymel

Personal details
- Party: Republican

Military service
- Branch/service: United States Army
- Battles/wars: World War I

Herbert McDowell served in the California State Assembly for the 51st district from 1921 to 1927. and during World War I he served in the United States Army.
