= 1996 Fresno mayoral election =

Fresno mayoral election, 1996
- March 26, 1996
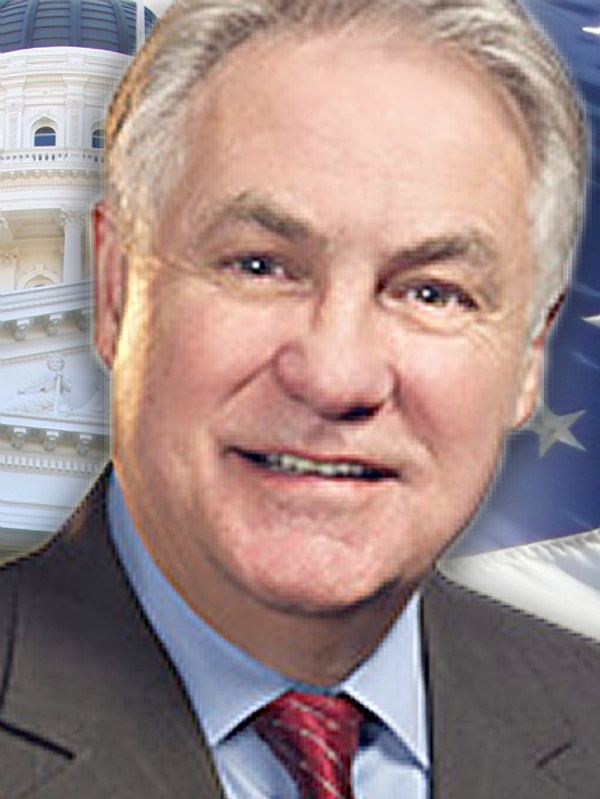

Candidate	Jim Patterson	Michael Erin Woody
Party	Republican	Nonpartisan
Popular vote	36,281	24,531
Percentage	53.0%	35.8%
Mayor before election
Jim Patterson
Republican
Elected mayor
Jim Patterson
Republican

The 1996 Fresno mayoral election was held on March 26, 1996, to elect the mayor of Fresno, California. It saw the reelection of Jim Patterson.

Since Patterson won a majority in the first round, no runoff was required.

== Results ==
Results
Candidate	Votes	%
Jim Patterson (incumbent)	36,281	53.0
Michael Erin Woody	24,531	35.8
James "Jim" Lanas	2,125	3.1
Lewis A. Jackson	1,901	2.7
Randy Risner	1,201	1.7
Johnny Nelum	1,068	1.5
Michael Eagles	763	1.1
Lawrence A. Cano	558	0.8
Mauro Buzz Gugliemo	2	0.0
Frank Ramirez	0	0.0
Unqualified write-ins	20	0.0
Total votes	68,450	
