= The Legend of Jake Kincaid =

2002 film

The Legend of Jake Kincaid is an independent Western film directed by Alan Autry, and released in 2002. The movie is currently available for streaming on Netflix under the title, Forgiven.

The year is 1878 and Jake Kincaid is a man just out of prison, full of hate and hard on the trail of the men responsible for the crime for which he was wrongly imprisoned. Kincaid is bent on revenge and it seems that nothing can stand between him and the gold he was accused of stealing. That is until he finds himself in the small lumber town of Fairplay, California where he learns that love is more powerful than hate and redemption more valuable than gold.

Starring Alan Autry and David Hart from the long running CBS television hit In the Heat of the Night. Jake Kincaid is Autry's directorial debut.

== Cast ==
- Alan Autry as Jake Kincaid
- David Hart as Sheriff Bob Logan
- Kimberlee Autry as Emma
- James W. Tuck as Luthor Hanks
- Ray Appleton as Josh Quinn

Filmed at Old Town near North Fork, California.
