= James G. Crichton =

American politician

Member of the California State Assembly from the 34th district
- In office January 4, 1943 - January 8, 1951
- Preceded by: Jacob M. Leonard
- Succeeded by: Wallace Henderson

Personal details
- Born: June 4, 1893 Eureka, California, US
- Died: March 5, 1954 (aged 60) Fresno, California, US
- Party: Democratic
- Spouse: Rose Belle Lewis (m. 1921 d. 1954)

Military service
- Branch/service: United States Army
- Battles/wars: World War I

James George Crichton (June 4, 1893 – March 5, 1954) was a United States Republican politician who served in the California State Assembly for the 34th district from 1943 to 1951.

Crichton was born in Eureka, California. During World War I he served in the United States Army.
