= 2004 Fresno mayoral election =

Fresno mayoral election, 2004
- March 2, 2004
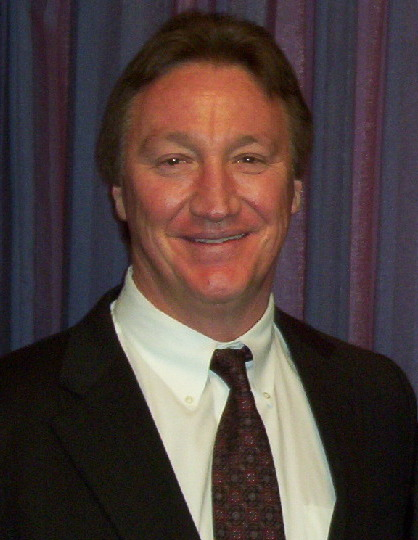

Candidate	Alan Autry	Sue Saigal
Party	Republican	Nonpartisan
Popular vote	48,744	13,904
Percentage	72.53%	20.69%
Mayor before election
Alan Autry
Republican
Elected mayor
Alan Autry
Republican

The 2004 Fresno mayoral election was held on March 2, 2004, to elect the mayor of Fresno, California. It saw the reelection of Alan Autry.

Since Autry won a majority in the first round, no runoff was required.

== Results ==
Results
Candidate	Votes	%
Alan Autry (incumbent)	48,744	72.53
Sue Saigal	13,904	20.69
Johnny W. Nelum, Sr.	2,348	3.49
Benjamin Junior Ra	2,389	4.54
Tony Farmer	813	1.21
Barbara Ann Hunt (write-in)	8	0.01
Other write-ins	225	0.33
Total votes	67,201	
