= Arthur L. Selland =

American politician

15th Mayor of Fresno
- In office April 21, 1958 – December 5, 1963
- Preceded by: C. Cal Evans
- Succeeded by: Wallace Henderson

21st President of the United States Conference of Mayors
- In office 1963
- Preceded by: Richard C. Lee
- Succeeded by: Raymond Tucker

Personal details
- Born: Arthur Leonard Selland; December 31, 1905; Flaxton, North Dakota, U.S.
- Died: December 5, 1963 (aged 57); Fresno, California, U.S.
- Political party: Republican
- Spouse: Cecelia Victoria Hagedorn (m. 1927-1963)
- Children: Marie; Donald; Constance; Judith; Anne; Stanley

Arthur L. Selland (December 31, 1905 – December 5, 1963) was an American politician, and mayor of Fresno, California from 1958 to 1963.

== Early life and family ==
Selland was born on December 31, 1905, to Henrik "Henry" Augustin Alfsen Selland and Helga Marie Christine Anderson in Flaxton, North Dakota, the eldest son and second of eleven children. Both parents immigrated with their families from Norway and settled in the area of the Canada–United States border in North Dakota and Minnesota. Arthur and his family moved to California around 1910 originally settling in Shasta County.

On October 1, 1927, Selland married Ceclia Victoria in Jackson County, Oregon. By 1935, the Sellands moved to Fresno where Arthur worked for Bank of America in the Bank of Italy Regional Office. He would go into stock trading and become a wealthy stockbroker during the later years of the Great Depression. Selland was also involved with E Clampus Vitus as a charter member of the Jim Savage Chapter.

== Civic career ==
Selland became involved with community affairs when he joined the Fresno City Schools as a board of trustee and eventually board president. On April 8, 1958, Selland beat out incumbent Mayor C. Cal Evans and former mayor Gordon Dunn with 40% of the vote out of nine candidates.

In 1962, Selland ran an unsuccessful Congressional run losing to B. F. Sisk.

=== Mayoralty ===
Selland was the genesis of Downtown Fresno redevelopment by backing and pushing through the Victor Gruen designed Fulton Mall (Fresno) which would turn a six-block portion of the city's main business center into a walkable pedestrian mall. Selland also pushed for the construction of the Fresno Convention Center in an effort to grow business and advance Fresno as a mid-size city. Advocating for business growth and city redevelopment attracted the attention of President Kennedy which resulted in Selland being asked to be one of 16 mayors nationwide to join Kennedy in his West Berlin Tour in June 1963.

Selland was elected president of the U.S. Conference of Mayors in 1963 and was in the process of gaining support for the Civil Rights Act of 1964 amongst mayors when he was killed in an automobile accident on December 5, 1963.

== Death ==
The accident was a result of driver negligence of missing a stop sign in dense fog. The crash killed Selland and Fresno Chamber of Commerce President Herbert Ferguson while severely injuring Richard Worrel and driver Lloyd Weber just thirteen days after the assassination of John F. Kennedy.

== Tributes ==
Several items in and around the city of Fresno are named in his honor:

- Selland Arena, completed in 1966, is named for him.
- Selland Avenue, which runs in a north–south direction however not continuous between Herndon Avenue and Weldon Avenue.
- The Arthur L. Selland Memorial Scholarship is an annual award to full-time undergraduate or graduate students of California State University, Fresno.

Political offices
Preceded by C. Cal Evans	15th Mayor of Fresno; 1958-1963	Succeeded by Wallace Henderson (acting)
