= Gordon Dunn =

American discus thrower (1912–1964)

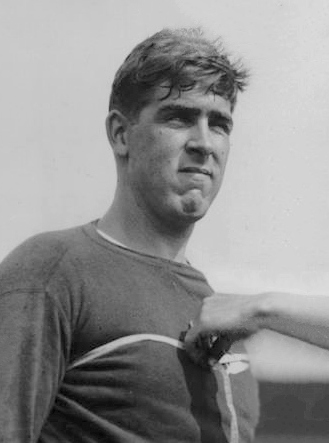
- Dunn in 1936

13th Mayor of Fresno
- In office April 25, 1949 – April 22, 1957
- Preceded by: Glenn M. DeVore
- Succeeded by: C. Cal Evans

Personal details
- Born: Gordon Glover Dunn; April 16, 1912 Portland, Oregon, U.S.
- Died: July 26, 1964 (aged 52) San Francisco, California, U.S.
- Party: Non-Party
- Spouses: Marjorie Ann Kitselman (m. 1935; div. 1938) Naomi McCool (m. 1939; div. 1963) Shirley M. Johnston (m. 1963)
- Children: Gordon Derek Dunn; Karen Dunn Woodward
- Education: Stanford University
- Sports career
- Height: 193 cm (6 ft 4 in)
- Weight: 110 kg (243 lb)
- Sport: Athletics
- Events: Discus throw, shot put
- Club: Olympic Club, San Francisco

Sports achievements and titles
- Personal bests: DT – 52.25 (1936); SP – 15.94 m (1934)
Medal record
Representing the United States
Olympic Games
| Silver medal – second place | 1936 Berlin | Discus throw |

Gordon Glover "Slinger" Dunn (April 16, 1912 – July 26, 1964) was an American discus thrower who won a silver medal at the 1936 Summer Olympics, a U.S. Navy lieutenant, and former mayor of Fresno, California from 1949 to 1957.

Godron Dunn was born April 16, 1912, to William F. Dunn and Olive C. Glover in Portland, Oregon. Dunn's father, William F. Dunn once served as the deputy city clerk for Fresno. Shortly after Dunn was born, the family moved home to Fresno, where the Dunn family had lived since the 1880s. Dunn's paternal grandfather, Thomas Dunn, was a pioneer resident of Fresno, a former councilmember, and potential mayoral candidate. Dunn Avenue is named for his grandfather, Thomas Dunn. Dunn graduated from Fresno High School and attended Stanford University. Dunn's penchant for track and field, and specifically discus throw, allowed him to continue these sports through both high school and college. Earlier in 1934 he won the NCAA and IC4A titles. After college, Dunn remained in Menlo Park.

== 1936 Berlin Olympics ==
Dunn participated in the discus competition for the United States Olympic Team at the 1936 Summer Olympics in Berlin, Germany. Dunn qualified in second position behind fellow U.S. Olympian Ken Carpenter. In the Final round, Dunn threw for 49.36 meters (161 feet, 10 3/4 inches) earning him a Silver Medal. The 1936 Olympics would be Dunn's first and only appearance due to the next Olympic games not occurring again until 1948 Summer Olympics as a result of World War II.

== Military service ==
Dunn returned to Menlo Park, where he divorced is first wife, Marjorie Kitselman, in 1938. He married Naomi McCool shortly after the divorce and moved back to his birthplace of Portland where he took a job working as a merchandizing salesman for Associated Oil. In 1942, Dunn joined the U.S. Navy and became a Lieutenant Commander in Office of Naval Intelligence for the duration of the war.

== Political career ==
Dunn ran for mayor in April 1949 under a platform of cleaning up the city. Dunn won the election over incumbent Mayor Glenn M. DeVore. When elected, he was the youngest mayor of Fresno at the time. During his first term, he led raids on bordellos and gambling dens. In addition, he sought to regulate pinball machines to outlaw their use for gambling in the city. Dunn also pushed for conversion of the Downtown Fresno streets to one-way traffic to lessen traffic gridlock, the upgrade of paving of the city streets, and the removal of street parking in favor of surface parking. Dunn also outlawed street racing amongst firefighters. For his zest in fighting crime and bringing order on city employees he qualified for the new nickname of "No-Fun Dunn." He frequented going to fire and police meeting and events, and is known to have had both red lights and a siren installed on his personal vehicle. Gordon ran for a second term in 1953 and won with 65% of the vote. His second term would see a similar platforms as his first term including significant increases to the Fresno Police Department staff rosters and budget. Dunn ran in 1957 for a third term and lost to C. Cal Evans. In 1958 the city charter was approved and the mayoral office was to be voted on again. Dunn ran in 1958 again for a third term but came in third place behind Evans and Arthur L. Selland.

== Post-political career ==
Dunn left Fresno and moved to San Francisco, California where he resided until death. In 1964, Gordon Dunn was inducted into the Fresno County Athletic Hall of Fame. On July 26, 1964, Gordon Dunn died of a heart attack at the age of 52, the same cause of death that took his grandfather 51 years earlier.

Political offices
| Preceded by Glenn M. DeVore (acting) | 13th Mayor of Fresno; 1949-1957 | Succeeded by C. Cal Evans |
