= Floyd H. Hyde =

American businessman and politician

17th Mayor of Fresno
- In office April 19, 1965 – January 22, 1969
- Preceded by: Wallace Henderson
- Succeeded by: Ted C. Wills

Assistant Secretary of Housing and Urban Development
- In office January 1969 – 1973
- President: Richard Nixon

Under Secretary of Housing and Urban Development
- In office 1973–1974
- President: Richard Nixon

Personal details
- Born: Floyd Harold Hyde; March 18, 1921 Fresno, California, U.S.
- Died: July 26, 2016 (aged 95) Silver Spring, Maryland, U.S.
- Party: Republican
- Education: Fresno State Normal School (BA); University of Southern California (JD)

Floyd Harold Hyde (1921–2016) was an American businessman, attorney, and politician of Volga German descent who was Mayor of Fresno from 1965 to January 1969 and served as Under Secretary of Housing and Urban Development for just under one year in 1973. Hyde was the last mayor of Fresno to have been both born and raised in Fresno until 2021 when Jerry Dyer became mayor. Hyde was born to Henry Jacob Heidt and Anna Stuckert, on March 18, 1921, in Fresno, California. Hyde was the third of four brothers. The Hyde family changed the family name from Heidt as a result of Anti-German sentiment during World War I as noted by Hyde's oldest brother, Delbert Heidt, retaining the original surname due to being born prior to the entry of the United States in World War I.

Hyde graduated from Fresno High School in 1939 and attended Fresno State Normal School graduating with a degree in Fine Arts in 1943. Upon graduation, Hyde enlisted in the United States Marine Corps and earned his officer commission of Captain at Marine Corps Base Quantico in Virginia. Hyde served in the Pacific Theater during World War II, and was stationed in Japan after the surrender. After the war, Floyd earned a Juris Doctor degree at the University of Southern California and returned to Fresno and started a law practice. Hyde would be the attorney representative for local radio station KARM in their pursuit against another station KFRE for the only VHF license in Fresno.

== Political career ==
Hyde's public career began in 1965, when he kicked off a campaign for mayor of Fresno. Hyde was not considered a contender and was not expected to win. The incumbent mayor, Wallace Henderson, announced he would not seek a full term. As a result, city councilmembers Bert DeLotto and James Mandella were the frontrunners over Hyde. Hyde won the mayoral race outright against the standing city councilmembers. During tenure as Mayor, Floyd help to gain recognition for Fresno to receive the first of its two All-America City Award. Hyde would name his wife Marilyn Hyde as sponsor of the USS Fresno (LST-1182) when in 1967.

In January 1969, Hyde was selected by President Richard Nixon as the Assistant Secretary of Housing and Urban Development under HUD Secretary George W. Romney. Due to this nomination and approval, Hyde resigned as Mayor of Fresno and did not seek another term.

In 1973, Hyde would be recommended and promoted to Under Secretary of Housing and Urban Development however would resign less than one year later due to the political turmoil of the Watergate scandal.

== Post politics ==
After political offices, Floyd became a visiting lecturer at Harvard University, Texas Southern University and the University of Southern California, Washington Public Affairs Center. Floyd continued a career in housing matters building off of working at HUD as CEO of the AFL-CIO Housing Investment Trust from 1986 to 1992.

== Death ==
Floyd Hyde died on July 26, 2016, after battling myelodysplastic syndrome.

Political offices
| Preceded by Wallace Henderson | 17th Mayor of Fresno; 1965-1969 | Succeeded by Ted C. Wills |
