= Flaxton, North Dakota =

- City
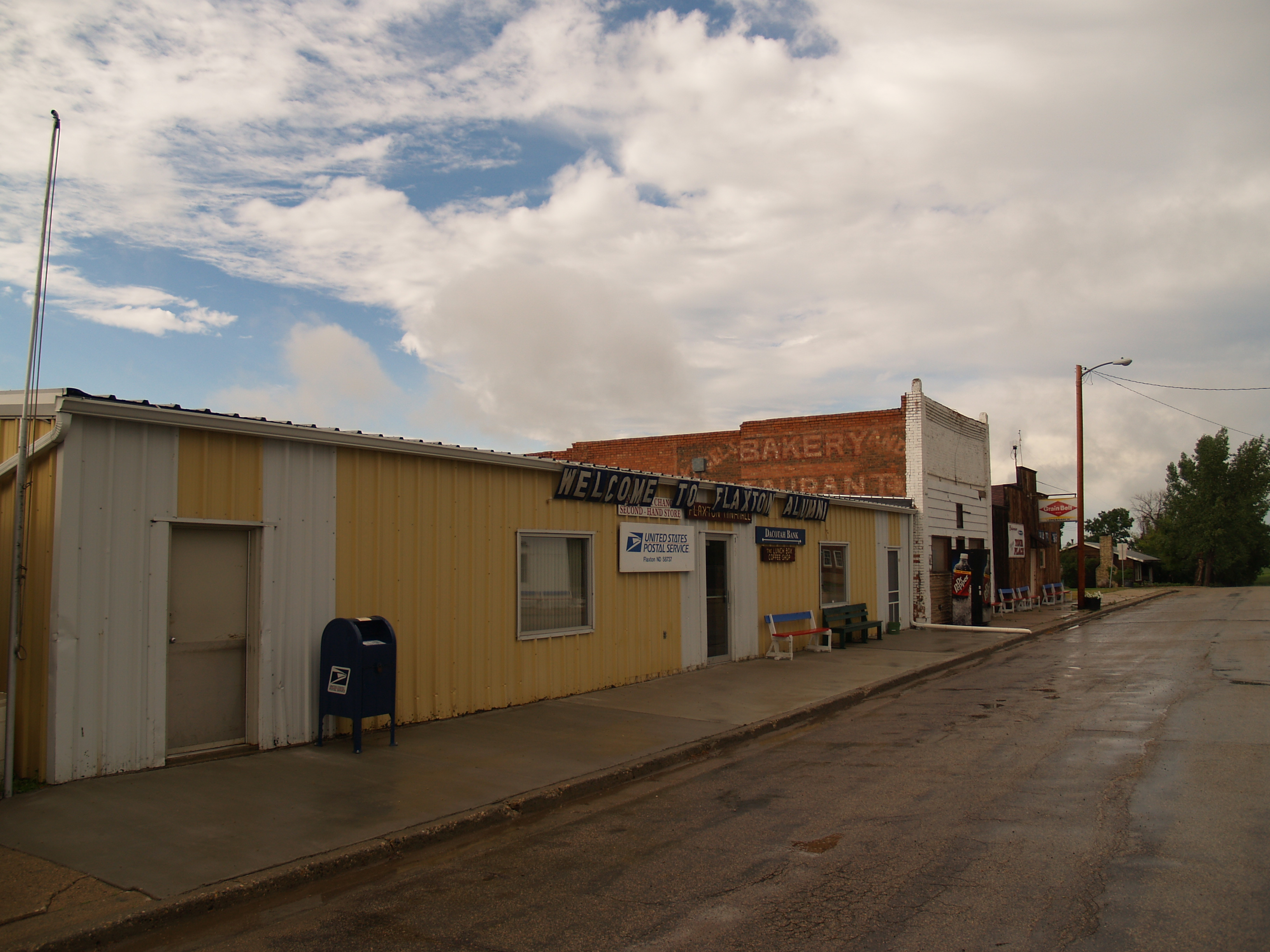
- Post office in Flaxton

- Location of Flaxton, North Dakota

- Location in the United States
- Coordinates: 48°53′51″N 102°23′36″W
- Country: United States
- State: North Dakota
- County: Burke
- Founded: 1900

Area
  - Total: 0.28 sq mi (0.73 km^{2})
  - Land: 0.28 sq mi (0.73 km^{2})
  - Water: 0 sq mi (0.00 km^{2})
- Elevation: 1,936 ft (590 m)

Population (2020)
  - Total: 60
  - Density: 211.9/sq mi (81.83/km^{2})
- Time zone: UTC-6 (CST)
  - Summer (DST): UTC-5 (CDT)
- ZIP code: 58737
- Area code: 701
- FIPS code: 38-26700
- GNIS feature ID: 1036035
- Website: flaxtonnd.myruralwater.com

Flaxton is a city in Burke County, North Dakota, United States. The population was 60 at the 2020 census. Flaxton was founded in 1900 and was named because the predominant crop in the area is flax.

== Geography ==
According to the United States Census Bureau, the city has a total area of 0.28 square miles (0.73 km^{2}), all land.

== Demographics ==
Historical population
Census	Pop.	Note	%±
1910	301		—
1920	374		24.3%
1930	423		13.1%
1940	362		−14.4%
1950	436		20.4%
1960	375		−14.0%
1970	286		−23.7%
1980	182		−36.4%
1990	121		−33.5%
2000	73		−39.7%
2010	66		−9.6%
2020	60		−9.1%
2021 (est.)	62		3.3%
U.S. Decennial Census; 2020 Census

=== 2010 census ===
As of the census of 2010, there were 66 people, 32 households, and 14 families residing in the city. The population density was 235.7 inhabitants per square mile (91.0/km^{2}). There were 69 housing units at an average density of 246.4 per square mile (95.1/km^{2}). The racial makeup of the city was 100.0% White. Hispanic or Latino of any race were 18.2% of the population.

There were 32 households, of which 21.9% had children under the age of 18 living with them, 31.3% were married couples living together, 12.5% had a male householder with no wife present, and 56.3% were non-families. 53.1% of all households were made up of individuals, and 25% had someone living alone who was 65 years of age or older. The average household size was 2.06 and the average family size was 3.14.

The median age in the city was 44.5 years. 28.8% of residents were under the age of 18; 0.0% were between the ages of 18 and 24; 21.2% were from 25 to 44; 24.3% were from 45 to 64; and 25.8% were 65 years of age or older. The gender makeup of the city was 56.1% male and 43.9% female.

=== 2000 census ===
As of the census of 2000, there were 73 people, 40 households, and 19 families residing in the city. The population density was 258.8 inhabitants per square mile (99.9/km^{2}). There were 77 housing units at an average density of 273.0 per square mile (105.4/km^{2}). The racial makeup of the city was 100.00% White.

There were 40 households, out of which 15.0% had children under the age of 18 living with them, 37.5% were married couples living together, 7.5% had a female householder with no husband present, and 52.5% were non-families. 50.0% of all households were made up of individuals, and 25.0% had someone living alone who was 65 years of age or older. The average household size was 1.83 and the average family size was 2.58.

In the city, the population was spread out, with 21.9% under the age of 18, 20.5% from 25 to 44, 28.8% from 45 to 64, and 28.8% who were 65 years of age or older. The median age was 53 years. For every 100 females, there were 108.6 males. For every 100 females age 18 and over, there were 111.1 males.

The median income for a household in the city was $13,571, and the median income for a family was $21,250. Males had a median income of $28,250 versus $11,250 for females. The per capita income for the city was $8,264. There were 50.0% of families and 53.3% of the population living below the poverty line, including 76.0% of under eighteens and 38.5% of those over 64.

== Climate ==
This climatic region is typified by large seasonal temperature differences, with warm to hot (and often humid) summers and cold (sometimes severely cold) winters. According to the Köppen Climate Classification system, Flaxton has a humid continental climate, abbreviated "Dfb" on climate maps.
