= Bert Delotto =

American politician

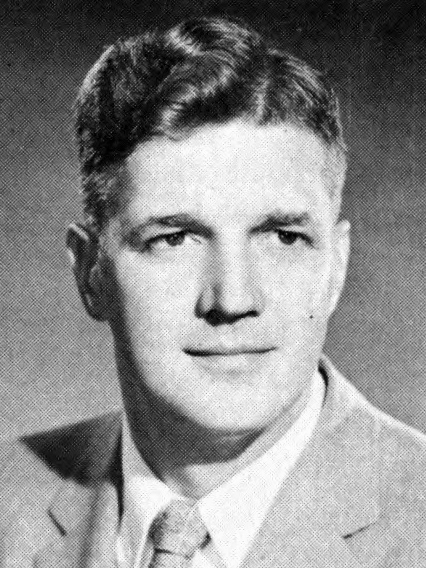
- Official portrait, 1961

Member of the California State Assembly from the 32nd district
- In office January 5, 1959 – January 7, 1963
- Preceded by: Wallace Henderson
- Succeeded by: George N. Zenovich

Personal details
- Born: June 21, 1919 Cleveland, Ohio, U.S.
- Died: October 16, 1991 (aged 72)
- Party: Democratic
- Spouse: Eileen McDonough
- Children: 2

Military service
- Branch/service: United States Navy
- Battles/wars: World War II

Umbert J. Delotto (June 21, 1919 – October 16, 1991) served in the California State Assembly for the 32nd district from 1959 to 1963 and during World War II he served in the United States Navy. Delotto died on October 16, 1991, at the age of 72.
