= Glenn M. DeVore =

American attorney and politician (1886–1950)

12th Mayor of Fresno, California
- In office May 9, 1947 – April 25, 1949
- Preceded by: Z. S. Leymel
- Succeeded by: Gordon Dunn

Personal details
- Born: Glenn Marwood DeVore; October 2, 1886 Cochranton, Pennsylvania, U.S.
- Died: April 19, 1950 (aged 63) Fresno, California, U.S.
- Party: Republican
- Spouse(s): Elizabeth Lee Ryce (m.1911-1925) d.1925 Eva M. Jackson (m.1946-1950)
- Children: Virginia Lee DeVore

Glenn M. DeVore was a telephone lineman, labor negotiator, district attorney, private attorney, city commissioner, and mayor of Fresno from 1947 to 1949 following the death of Z. S. Leymel.

Glenn Marwood DeVore was born October 2, 1886, to Frank DeVore and Ada May in Cochranton, Pennsylvania. DeVore came to Fresno originally as a electrician and lineman for the Pacific Telephone and Telegraph Company. In 1911, DeVore married Elizabeth Lee Ryce in Selma, California. While working for Pacific Telephone and Telegraph, DeVore became active with labor and worked closely in union representation between the workers and company directors. This led DeVore to begin to study law. DeVore continued as a lineman while he studied, tested and passed State Bar Exam in 1919. It was at this time that DeVore began to practice law and be counsel for labor groups. DeVore is considered one of the founding members of the Fresno Labor Council.

== Transit strike ==
On May 28, 1920, drivers of the Fresno Traction Company began to strike and return rail cars to the car barn due to company refusal to recognize their desire and support for a union. Initially, the strike lasted until June 24, 1920, when wage demands were agreed however the Fresno Traction Company refused to remove the strike-breakers hired over the four week period. DeVore was selected as representative for the union to negotiate with the owners of the Fresno Traction Company and the City of Fresno for wages, policy, and recognition. The result was the eventual unionization of the Fresno Traction Company and the early beginnings of the Amalgamated Transit Union Local 1027. The successful negotiation by DeVore made him popular amongst workers and in 1921, DeVore ran for the Fresno City Commission, the precursor to the Fresno City Council.

== Political career ==
DeVore served on the Fresno City Commission for the first time from 1921 to 1926. During that time, DeVore's votes were fiscally conservative and for small government. DeVore voted down may proposals that would have increased the size of the city government or place the government in charge of private enterprise. However, he worked to negotiate favorable financial terms for the city in the form of franchise agreements where the city received a payment for a private business to perform a service to city residents. DeVore was reelected in 1923 to serve a full term.

=== Fresno County District Attorney ===
DeVore ran in 1926 in a seven person race for Fresno County District Attorney against incumbent George Lovejoy.

During his tenure as District Attorney, DeVore increased the pressure on raiding gambling halls, and bootlegging. It is noted that in the first two years as district attorney, DeVore and assistants had a 90% conviction rate. DeVore also worked as counsel for the county and charter committee in the adoption of a new home-rule charter which is still in use in Fresno County today. In 1932, DeVore sought the Republican nomination for the House of Representatives losing to Henry E. Barbour by a coin-flip after tying in number of votes cast. DeVore continued to serve as Fresno County District Attorney until 1934 when he lost to Daniel F. Conway. DeVore returned to private practice; however, his political career took only a short break.

=== City Commission ===
On April 9, 1942, DeVore was unanimously reappointed to the Fresno City Commission to fill the position of a commissioner who recently died and vacated the seat. This led DeVore to reengage in holding elected office by then starting a campaign for Fresno Superior Court Judge within a month of appointment back to the city commission. DeVore lost the close race by 23 votes. DeVore remained on the Fresno City Commission as a commissioner until being appointed mayor after the death of mayor Z. S. Leymel.

=== Mayor ===
DeVore was the second mayor after Alva E. Snow promoted to the mayoral office after the death of the incumbent and the second Fresno mayor after Snow to have served previously as the Fresno County District Attorney before becoming mayor.

During DeVore's mayoral tenure, Fresno installed its first parking meters in the downtown district and began to unite the city and county health departments into the Fresno County Department of Public Health. DeVore and the city commission oversaw the first collaboration of city and Fresno City Schools on giving access to school playgrounds for recreation. His term also saw the development of the Fresno Yosemite International Airport. In April 1949, DeVore ran for a full term as mayor and lost to Gordon Dunn. DeVore ran for Superior Court Judge in 1950, but never made it to the primary.

== Death ==
Glenn M. DeVore died April 19, 1950, just 48 days before the June 1950 primary for Superior Court Judge. The cause of death was attributed to either a heart attack or stomach ailment. Flags in the city were ordered to half-mast by Mayor Gordon Dunn to honor DeVore.

Political offices
Preceded by Z. S. Leymel	12th Mayor of Fresno; 1947-1949	Succeeded by Gordon Dunn
