= Karen Humphrey =

American politician (born 1945)

21st Mayor of Fresno
- In office May 9, 1989 – May 11, 1993
- Preceded by: Dale Doig
- Succeeded by: Jim Patterson

Personal details
- Born: Karen Humphrey; January 1, 1945 (age 81) White Sulphur Springs, West Virginia, U.S.
- Party: Democratic
- Spouse: Ken Clarke (m. 1972) (Died 2019)
- Education: University of Southern California (BA); California State University, Sacramento (MPP), (MWS)

Karen Humphrey is a former local news reporter, who later served as mayor of Fresno, California between 1989 and 1993. She was the first female mayor of Fresno, and as to date, the last Democratic mayor the city has had. She lost re-election to businessman Jim Patterson, not only losing in the primary, but only receiving 18% of the vote, and finishing third overall.

== Education ==
Humphrey obtained a bachelor's degree in Humanities from the University of Southern California and a master's Degree in public policy and women's studies from California State University, Sacramento.

== Careers ==
The start of Humphrey's career and professional life began when she was a news reporter and anchor for local news stations in Eureka and Fresno, California. She was the first woman reporter on air in Fresno. In 1979, she decided to take her talents elsewhere and was elected to the Fresno City Council, where she served two terms.

After her career as mayor, Humphrey worked in educational policy at the state level. She became Executive Director of the California Postsecondary Education Commission in 2009, and served in that role until 2011 when the commission was disbanded.

Since her move to Sacramento, she has focused her attention on getting more women into public office.

== Electoral history ==
1989 Fresno mayoral election
Candidate	Votes	%
Karen Humphrey	24,187	52.30
Tony Capozzi	19,682	42.60
Mike Eagles	543	1.1
Anthony G. Garza	507	1.0
Michael Escandon	419	0.9
Edmund D'Arcy-Clarke	310	0.6
Fred Askew	305	0.6
Gabriel Cervantes	221	0.4
Esteban Martinez	0	0.0
Total votes	46,174	100
Turnout	{{{votes}}}	31.70%

1993 Fresno mayoral election
Candidate	Votes	%
Jim Patterson	31,405	46.60
Brian Setencich	21,325	31.60
Karen Humphrey	11,391	16.9
Others	3,304	4.9
Total votes	67,425	100
Turnout	{{{votes}}}	31.70%

== Family ==
Humphrey was married to Ken Clarke, and she resides in Sacramento.

Political offices
Preceded by Dale Doig	21st Mayor of Fresno; 1989-1993	Succeeded by Jim Patterson
