= Frank A. Homan =

American politician (1875–1958)

10th Mayor of Fresno, California
- In office April 26, 1937 – April 28, 1941
- Preceded by: Z. S. Leymel
- Succeeded by: Z. S. Leymel

Personal details
- Born: Francis Andreas Hohman; May 29, 1875 Fremont, California, U.S.
- Died: June 25, 1958 (aged 83) Fresno, California, U.S.
- Party: Republican
- Spouse: Sarah Estella Chance (m.1900-1958)
- Education: Master of Public Service (Honorary)

Frank Andrew Homan (born Francis Andreas Hohman) was a business owner, Fresno Unified School District board member, Fresno City commissioner, and mayor of Fresno from 1937 to 1941.

Frank A. Homan was born May 29, 1875, to Catherine (Katherina) and Jacob (Jakob) Hohman in Fremont, California. Frank was one of six children for the Hohmans. By 1883, the Hohmans moved to Fresno from Mayfield, California (present-day Palo Alto, California). The Americanization of "Hohman" to "Homan" began about the time of Jacob's naturalization in 1868. By the time the family arrived in Fresno, Homan was the surname used. Frank Homan grew up on the edge of the Germantown neighborhood of Fresno.

Homan attended Fresno High School being involved in student government and baseball. Homan played baseball outside of class for The Fresno Expositor on a company sponsored team alongside future MLB player and manager Frank Chance.

After graduation in 1893, Homan begin work as a reporter for The Fresno Morning Republican. Homan would work until 1895 when he would join the United States Postal Service as the assistant postmaster until 1903. On January 4, 1900, Homan would marry Frank Chance's sister, Sarah, in which Chance would give away the bride during the off-season while a player for the Chicago Cubs. Homan would go into the private financial business selling oil stock and supplies.

== Civic career ==
=== Fresno City Board of Education ===
Homan ran for office in 1909 to serve as Board President of the Fresno City Schools During that term, Homan, along with school superintendent C. L. McLane built an open air school to teach quarantined students that did not have the Smallpox vaccine. Homan served for a single term from 1909 to 1913. Although no longer on the school board, Homan would continue to advocate for better schools, bond measures and the construction of the new Fresno High School.

While not engaging directly in civic business, Homan continued to build his business as he began to transform his business into a sporting goods and athletics supplies store called Homan & Company.

=== Merchant's Association ===
Homan was part of the original businesses that established the Merchants Association of Fresno where he would be elected president of the association from 1915 to 1918. Homan would also find himself called upon by virtue of his associations with politicians and merchants alike to continue in civic leadership. As World War I began, Homan was placed in charge of Fresno's Liberty bond campaign which further made Homan a staple in the city after raising $75,000 (equivalent to $1.6 million in 2020 dollars) in a single day.

Homan continued in business ventures alongside his sporting goods store. Homan would serve until the Great Depression as the Vice-President of Fresno County Chamber of Commerce. During the 1920s, Homan would serve on the board of directors for banks and mortgage businesses. Homan would begin to reenter the political world with an appointment by Mayor A. E. Sunderland to study the matters of improving of travel and traffic through the city. The committee would recommend traffic police, crosswalks, uniform street widths, signal lights, parking meters, parallel parking, and speed limits throughout the city. The committee would also recommend the expansion of Fresno Chandler Executive Airport.

During the Depression, Homan would be selected by Mayor Z. S. Leymel to be part of the committee of fifteen that would review, advise, and approve PWA projects as part of the New Deal under the Franklin D. Roosevelt Administration.

=== Mayor ===
In March 1937, Homan agreed to enter the race for mayor against Z. S. Leymel who was going for his third consecutive term. Leymel recently had lost a citywide vote on city takeover of public utilities and was seen as weak going into the election. He ran on a pro-business, pro-recovery, lower private-owned utility rate platform and won with 62% of the vote over the incumbent. During this term, Homan and the city commission worked with New Deal opportunities to build a new city hall (today known as the City Hall Annex) and work to begin the first of several projects to create flood control. Homan's term however was dominated by the discontinuing of the electric trams of the Fresno Traction Company in favor of bus service. Homan and the city commission worked for nearly two years to create a franchise agreement that would result in less annual revenue to the city in trade for the scrap metal from the removal of the steel tracks. The agreement was completed and the Fresno Traction Company discontinued railway service and began bus service on March 1, 1939. On March 22, Fresno Traction Company's parent company the Southern Pacific Transportation Company sold the line to National City Lines which rebranded the system Fresno City Lines, Inc. Homan and city commissioner Jean L. Vincenz were unaware of the sale until invited to the March 22 announcement by Southern Pacific Transportation Company. Less than one year later, Homan and the city commission were then informed that National City Lines had sold Fresno City Lines, Inc. to Pacific City Lines. The bus service would continue to follow Homan's administration to the ballot box in April 1941 where he would run for re-election the same day that the city would vote to end the franchise agreement and begin the bus service as a municipal ran system. Both the municipal bus service vote and Homan would be defeated at the ballot box when former Mayor Z. S. Leymel would win and regain the mayoral office with 57% of the vote.

=== Post-Mayor ===
His post-mayoral civic career found Homan sitting as Chairman of the Fresno State College board of governors from 1941 to 1958 and earning an honorary Master's Degree in Public Service. Homan found himself continuing to be called upon in civic affairs as a city elder to work on a new city charter, the only living former mayor between 1950 and 1957, President of the Fresno County Historical Society, and Chairman of the corps advisory council for the Fresno Salvation Army. Homan would honored by the city and Fresno City School with the Frank A. Homan Elementary School named for him in 1952.

Political offices
| Preceded by Z. S. Leymel | 10th Mayor of Fresno; 1937-1941 | Succeeded by Z. S. Leymel |
