= Dale Doig =

American politician (1935–2022)

20th Mayor of Fresno
- In office January 26, 1985 – May 9, 1989
- Preceded by: Dan Whitehurst
- Succeeded by: Karen Humphrey

Personal details
- Born: July 24, 1935 Los Angeles, California, U.S.
- Died: February 10, 2022 (aged 86)
- Party: Democratic
- Spouse: Cecelia Anne Fletcher (m.1958 d.2017)
- Education: California State University, Fresno (MA)
- Occupation: High school teacher

Dale Edwin Doig (July 24, 1935 – February 10, 2022) was an American politician who served four terms from 1973 to 1989 on the Fresno City Council. He also served as Mayor of Fresno, California, between 1985 and 1989.

== Early life and education ==
Doig was born in Los Angeles, California, on July 24, 1935, to Frank Dennimore Doig and Pauline Ruth Turner as the eldest of three children. He was raised in the Beach Cities area of Los Angeles County.

Doig graduated Mira Costa High School in 1953 and attended California State University, Fresno graduating in 1957. Following a similar path as his father, Doig earned a teaching credential and began teaching. In 1966, Doig began teaching at Roosevelt High School and continued there until retiring in 1996.

== Political career ==
In 1973, Doig ran and was elected to the Fresno City Council. As a city councilmember, Doig was involved in the creation of the 1974 and 1984 General Plans for Fresno. In addition, during his time on the council, the city created its first historic preservation ordinances which included the listing of the Old Fresno Water Tower.

On January 26, 1985, Doig became acting mayor after the resignation of Dan Whitehurst finishing out Whitehurst's last four months of his term before running and winning his own term. It was at this time in early 1986 Doig and the city of Fresno were approached by MTM Enterprises about the comedy miniseries Fresno. Mayor Doig served in the role as himself. Filming in Fresno started July 1986.

== Personal life and death ==
Doig was predeceased by his wife and his son, Kenneth. He died on February 10, 2022, at the age of 86.

== See also ==
- List of mayors of Fresno, California

Political offices
Preceded by Dan Whitehurst	20th Mayor of Fresno; 1985-1989	Succeeded by Karen Humphrey
