= Ted C. Wills =

Mayor of Fresno from 1969 to 1977

18th Mayor of Fresno
- In office January 22, 1969 – April 25, 1977
- Preceded by: Floyd H. Hyde
- Succeeded by: Dan Whitehurst

Personal details
- Born: Theodore Carl Wills; November 28, 1911 Sanger, California, U.S.
- Died: November 6, 2003 (aged 91) Fresno, California, U.S.
- Party: Democratic
- Spouse: Bertha Metzler (m. 1932; died 1995)
- Children: Theodore Carl Wills Jr.

Theodore Carl Wills Sr. (November 28, 1911 – November 6, 2003) was an American labor leader and politician in Fresno, California. He served as a Fresno City Council member from 1954 to 1987 and was the mayor of Fresno from 1969 to 1977. He was the father of major-league pitcher Ted Wills.

== Biography ==
Theodore Carl Wills was born on November 28, 1911, in Sanger, California, to Alexander Wills and Katherine Andreas; both Volga German immigrants from Russia. On December 31, 1932, Wills married Bertha Metzler. Their child, Theodore Carl Wills Jr., was born February 8, 1934—he went on to become a professional baseball player.

Starting as a mechanic at a local creamery, Wills worked into being a labor leader amongst the local unions and was elected to serve as secretary-treasurer for the Fresno Chapter of the Creamery Employees Association in 1936. In 1954, Wills was appointed to serve on the Fresno City Commission, the predecessor to the Fresno City Council. This was the beginning of his three decade role in city politics and policy for Fresno, which included civic and policy choices such as the construction of Fulton Mall and Selland Arena. Other policies that Wills supported were the suburban growth of Fresno to help spur post-World War II growth away from the central part of the city and north towards the San Joaquin River and Madera County.

In 1969, Wills became acting mayor after incumbent Floyd H. Hyde was appointed by President Richard Nixon to be the Under Secretary of Housing and Urban Development. Later that year, Wills successfully ran for his first full term as mayor.

In 1977, Wills ran for a third term as mayor; however, he lost the race by 117 votes to Dan Whitehurst. At the time, the mayor sat on the city council, so Wills lost both the mayoral race and his city council seat. Wills ran once again a few years later, and won a seat on the Fresno City Council. In 1987, Wills lost his District 1 seat to Craig Scharton.

Ted C. Wills Sr. died on November 6, 2003, from complications due to Alzheimer's disease. The Ted C. Wills Community Center in Fresno is named in his honor.

Political offices
Preceded by Floyd H. Hyde	18th Mayor of Fresno; 1969-1977	Succeeded by Dan Whitehurst
