= Lee Brand =

American politician

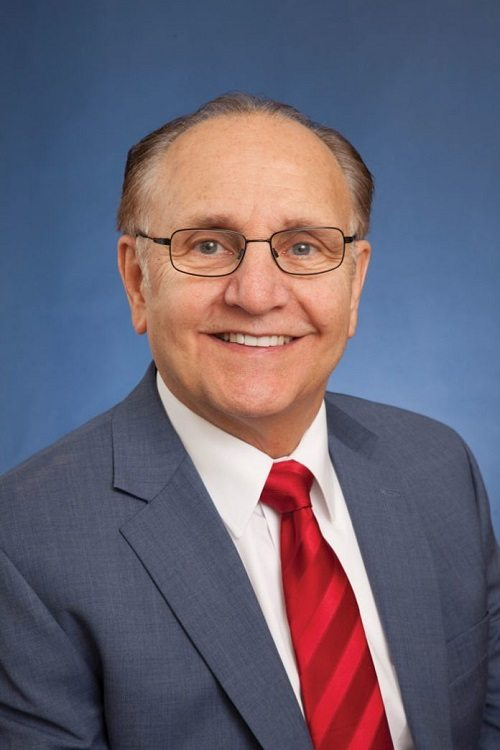

25th Mayor of Fresno
- In office January 3, 2017 – January 5, 2021
- Preceded by: Ashley Swearengin
- Succeeded by: Jerry Dyer

Personal details
- Born: April 5, 1949 (age 77) The Dalles, Oregon, U.S.
- Party: Republican
- Spouse: Trish Brand (m. 1980)
- Children: 4
- Education: Fresno City College; California State University, Fresno (BA); University of Southern California (MPA)

Military service
- Allegiance: United States
- Branch/service: United States Air Force
- Years of service: 1967–1973
- Unit: California Air National Guard

Lee R. Brand (born April 5, 1949) is an American politician and businessman who served as the 25th mayor of Fresno, California. He took office as the successor for Ashley Swearengin on January 3, 2017. Upon inauguration, Brand became the oldest to assume the mayoralty of Fresno beating the previous holder Dr. Chester A. Rowell by 3 years and 21 days.

== Early life ==
Brand was born in The Dalles, Oregon. His father was Archie L. Brand better known as ‘Brandy,’ of English descent, and his mother was Florence G. Trosi. His parents, his brother and he lived in a small motel room with no indoor bathroom. Archie and Florence worked for his grandfather Archie M. Brand better known as A.M. as dishwashers and general labor at the café, gas station, motel and small zoo A.M. operated.

Brand's mother was from Fresno, and his maternal grandfather and grandmother, Ralph Trosi and Pierina Trosi immigrated to the U.S. from Naples.

The Brand family moved to Fresno when A.M. no longer ran the roadside business and started a career as a sea lion trainer, touring the county with his ‘Sparky the Seal’ act. Brand's family arrived in Fresno in 1954 where he and his brother began Elementary school.

Growing up in a poor household, Brand began committing petty theft while in elementary school. While in junior high, Brand and some friends were arrested for breaking and entering several schools and served time in the juvenile hall work program. In 1964, when Brand was only 15, his father died in a plane crash.

After graduating in 1967, Brand briefly attended Fresno City College before enlisting in the California Air National Guard.

After less than half a year in active duty as a technician, Brand returned to Fresno and engaged in a lifestyle he described as "sex, drugs, and rock and roll" before experiencing a "calling from God" in 1971. Brand began taking heavy course loads at Fresno City College and later California State University, Fresno (Fresno State) and graduated in 1973 from Fresno State summa cum laude. Brand paid for his education by working at a local Sears and doing weekend patrol for the California Air National Guard. He later received an honorable discharge from the Guard.

== Business career ==
Brand completed his M.P.A. at the University of Southern California in 1974 via a project instead of thesis. From 1974 to 1978, Brand was an assistant mental health administrator for Madera County. On the side, Brand flipped houses and eventually opened a real estate business, Brand-Glenn & Associates, and car stereo store named The Sound Machine. Brand's real estate business became Brand & Associates in 1981, and Brand co-founded Westco Equities in 1987.

== Political career ==
In 1996, Brand managed the successful campaign of Fresno City Council candidate Ken Steitz.

After an unsuccessful campaign for the city council in 2000, Brand began serving on the Fresno Planning Commission as an appointee of mayor Alan Autry.

Brand won election to the City Council in 2008 for the northeast Fresno seat previously held by Jerry Duncan. He was re-elected to a second four term in 2012. During his eight years on the Fresno City Council, he wrote 19 legislative acts focused on fiscal management and better government. In 2011, he served as the Council President.

In 2016, Brand ran for the Mayor of the City of Fresno. He finished second in the primary and won the November runoff. He was sworn in as the 25th Mayor of Fresno on January 3, 2017.

== Post-Political career ==
Lee Brand concluded his term as Mayor of Fresno on January 5, 2021. After finishing his political career, he began researching his family ancestry finding surprising information about his father and grandfather.

This motivated him to write a book about family relationships through generations. His debut novel Discovering the Family I Never Knew, is a fictional book inspired by real people and events in his life.

In 2024, his second fiction book called The Emperor of California was published. In 2025, Brand released his third book, The Last Desperado, a novel set behind the backdrop of the Great Depression.

== Electoral history ==
2000 Fresno County Supervisor seat 2 election
Candidate	First round		Runoff	
Candidate	Votes	%	Votes	%
Susan B. Anderson	22,844	46.12	44,471	68.50
Ken Steitz	14,901	30.08	20,383	31.40
Lee Brand	9,355	18.89		
John Mendoza	2,365	4.77		
Write-ins	68	0.14	70	0.11
Total	49,533	100	64,924	100

2008 Fresno City Council District 6 election
Candidate	Votes	%
Lee Brand	8,601	70.92
Michelle Jorgensen	3,128	25.79
Matt White	378	3.12

2012 Fresno City Council District 6 election
Candidate	Votes	%
Lee Brand (incumbent)	11,074	98.33
Write-ins	118	1.67
Total	11,273	100
Voter turnout	28.85%	

2016 Fresno Mayoral Primary election
Candidate	First round		Runoff	
Candidate	Votes	%	Votes	%
Lee Brand	25,491	30.79	71,776	51.20
Henry Perea	37,006	44.70	68,053	48.54
H. Spees	15,089	18.23		
Doug Vagim	2,910	3.52		
Richard B. Renteria	2,090	2.52		
Write-ins	199	0.24	363	0.26
Total	69,795	100	140,192	100

== See also ==
- List of mayors of the 50 largest cities in the United States

Political offices
Preceded by Ashley Swearengin	25th Mayor of Fresno; 2017–2021	Succeeded by Jerry Dyer
