= Dan Whitehurst =

American lawyer

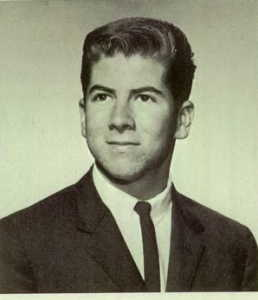

19th Mayor of Fresno
- In office April 25, 1977 – January 26, 1985
- Preceded by: Ted C. Wills
- Succeeded by: Dale Doig

Personal details
- Born: Daniel Keenan Whitehurst; October 4, 1948 (age 77) Los Banos, California, U.S.
- Party: Democratic
- Spouse: Kathleen McCann (m. 1969)
- Education: Saint Mary's College of California (BA); University of California, Hastings College of the Law (JD)

Daniel Keenan Whitehurst (born October 4, 1948) is an American former Democratic Party politician, who served as the mayor of Fresno, California from 1977 to 1985.

== Early life and education ==
He started college at age 16 and law school at age 20. He practiced law briefly and then worked for a time at his father's funeral home before entering politics in 1975.

== Civic career ==
Whitehurst was a member of Fresno City Council from 1975 to 1977, and was elected mayor of Fresno in 1977. He took office at the age 28, making him the youngest mayor of a major city in the U.S. and the youngest mayor in the history of Fresno. In 1982, while still serving as mayor, Whitehurst ran against California Governor Jerry Brown for the Democratic nomination to the U.S. Senate. He came 4th with 167,574 votes (6.10%).

After leaving office in 1985, Whitehurst remained active in local politics. Beginning in 1986, he was the chair of the California Healthy Cities Steering Committee, and between 1986 and 1987, he was the program evaluator at the Ford Foundation Innovations in Government Program. From 1985 to 1988, Whitehurst participated in Harvard University's Executive Session on Community Policing. He was also the chair of the Arts to Zoo Commission in the Fresno Metropolitan Projects Authority (1993-1994), and of the Great Valley Center (1997-1999).

Whitehurst practiced also law and was engaged in various business ventures. He ran again for mayor of Fresno in 2000, but he lost to Republican Alan Autry.

Political offices
Preceded by Ted C. Wills	19th Mayor of Fresno; 1977-1985	Succeeded by Dale Doig
