= Alan Autry =

American football player, politician and actor (born 1952)

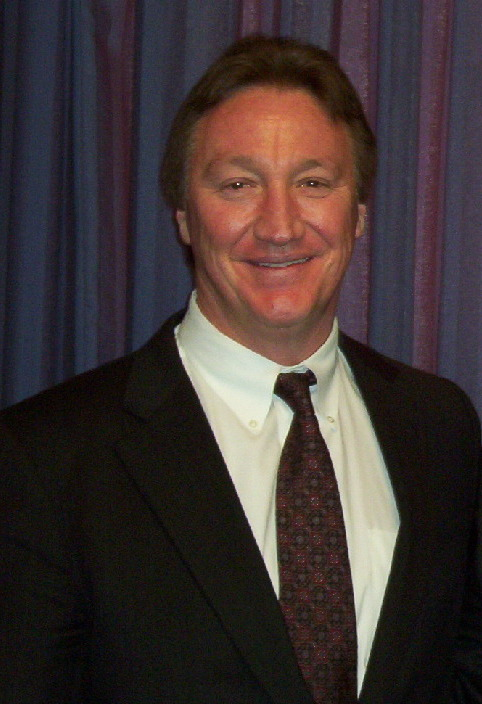
- Autry in 2003

23rd Mayor of Fresno
- In office January 5, 2001 – January 6, 2009
- Preceded by: Jim Patterson
- Succeeded by: Ashley Swearengin

Personal details
- Born: Carlos Alan Autry Jr. July 31, 1952 (age 74) Shreveport, Louisiana, U.S.
- Party: Republican
- Spouses: Vicky Brown (m. 1980; div. 1986) Kimberlee Autry (m. 1994; died 2025)
- Children: 3
- Relatives: Gene Autry (distant cousin)
- Occupation: NFL football player, actor, radio host, politician

Carlos Alan Autry Jr. (also known for a time as Carlos Brown; born July 31, 1952) is an American actor, politician, and former football player. During his brief career in the National Football League, he played as a quarterback and was known as Carlos Brown.

Autry played the role of Captain Bubba Skinner on the NBC, and later CBS, television drama series In the Heat of the Night, starring Carroll O'Connor. He has also appeared in films and other television shows. In November 2000, he was elected mayor of Fresno, California, and served for two four-year terms through January 2009. From 2008 to 2011, Autry hosted a talk-radio show on KYNO AM 940 in Fresno. He now hosts a midday show on KXEX 1550 AM in Fresno.

== Early life ==
Autry was born in Shreveport, Louisiana, the son of Carl and Verna (née Brown) Autry. His name was changed to Carlos Brown when he was a year old, after his parents divorced. He worked alongside his mother and stepfather, Joe Duty, in California's San Joaquin Valley, where they planted and harvested crops, traveling around the valley living in migrant-worker camps. When he was 12, they settled in Riverdale, California.

== Football career ==
In high school, Autry was a star quarterback for the Riverdale Cowboys. He received an athletic scholarship to the University of the Pacific in Stockton, California, where he was a second-string tight end in his senior year for the Tigers. In 1975, he was selected by the Green Bay Packers, where he ended up in 1976, as the starting quarterback for three games.

His football career ended quickly when he was cut from the team by then-coach Bart Starr. Autry then went to Hollywood to become an actor. He made a football comeback attempt, playing for the B.C. Lions of the CFL in 1979 (as Carlos Brown). He was the third-string quarterback behind Joe Paopao and another ex-Green Bay Packer, Jerry Tagge.

== Acting career ==
Autry made his film debut in the 1978 motion picture Remember My Name. He met his father, Carl Autry Sr., for the first time in 1981, while on location in Shreveport for the motion picture Southern Comfort, after he found Carl's name in the telephone book. Afterwards, he made the decision to return to his birth surname of Autry. During his acting years, he struggled with drug and alcohol use, according to an interview with Pat Robertson's The 700 Club in 2007.

== Personal life ==
After nine years in Hollywood, Autry returned home and left his career. "I realized that God had moved in my life like never before. I really realized what God and the power of Jesus Christ was," he said on The 700 Club.

By 1986, he was divorced and became a born-again Christian and began to devote much of his time to working with charitable causes. He was married to his second wife, Kimberlee Autry, for 31 years until her death in 2025; the couple has two children, and Autry has a child (b.1981) from his first marriage.

== Filmography ==
=== Television ===
==== Starring roles ====
- In the Heat of the Night (1988–95) as Officer/Sergeant/Lieutenant/Captain Bubba Skinner
- Grace Under Fire (1995–96) as Rick Bradshaw
- Style & Substance (1998) as Earl
- Sons of Thunder (1999) as Butch McMann

==== Guest-starring roles ====
- Hello, Larry – "The Final Papers" (1979) as Max [credited as Carlos Brown]
- Seven Brides for Seven Brothers – "Gold Fever" (1982) as J.T. [credited as Carlos Brown]
- Best of the West – "The Funeral" (1982) [credited as Carlos Brown]
- Cheers – "The Boys in the Bar" (1983) as Tom Kenderson
- The Mississippi – "Murder at Mt. Parnassus" (1983)
- The A-Team
  - "Labor Pains" (1983) as Gary Crenshaw
  - "Quarterback Sneak" (1986) as Mike "The Hammer" Horn
- The Dukes of Hazzard
  - "Dr. Jekyll and Mr. Duke" (1984) as Hurley
  - "10 Million Dollar Sheriff" (Parts 1&2) (1981) as Dawson [credited as Carlos Brown]
- Hunter – "High Bleacher Man" (1984) as Whitey McVee
- Newhart – "Will the Real Dick Loudon Please Shut Up?" (1986) as Ed McKendrick
- St. Elsewhere – "Out on a Limb" (1986) as John Corzinsky
- The Facts of Life – "Peekskill Law" (1988) as Clark Darrin
- Hart of Dixie (2015) – as Mayor Todd Gainey Sr. of rival town Fillmore, AL
- Tulsa King (2022) - as Brian Gillen
- 9-1-1: Lone Star (2023–24) - as Ranger Chief Bridges

=== Films ===
Credited as Alan Autry

- Roadhouse 66 (1984) as Hoot
- O.C. and Stiggs (1985)
- The Eagle and the Bear (1985)
- Brewster's Millions (1985) as Biff Brown
- House (1985) as Cop #3
- Nomads (1986) as Olds
- Blue de Ville (1986) as Sgt. Auggie Johnson
- At Close Range (1986) as Ernie
- Proud Men (1987) as Brian Winoon
- Destination America (1987) as Larry Leathergood
- Amazing Grace and Chuck (1987) as George
- World Gone Wild (1987) as Hank
- Street of Dreams (1988) as Maury Fields
- The Big One: The Great Los Angeles Earthquake (1990) as Matt
- Intruders (1992) as Joe Wilkes
- The Legend of Jake Kincaid (2002) as Jake Kincaid
- Forgiven (2011) as Jake Kincaid
- Victory by Submission (2016) as Hank Hendricks

Credited as Carlos Brown

- Remember My Name (1978) as Rusty
- North Dallas Forty (1979) as Balford
- Rage! (1980) as Man #B
- Popeye (1980) as Slug (a bully)
- Southern Comfort (1981) as Cpl. Nolan (Coach) Bowden
- Dangerous Company (1982) as Donald Robinette

== Politics ==
Autry, a Republican, was elected in 2000 to succeed Jim Patterson as the mayor of Fresno, defeating former mayor Dan Whitehurst. He was elected to a second term (2005–2009) on March 2, 2004, with more than 72% of the vote. Because of term limits, he was ineligible to run for re-election. In November 2008, he endorsed Ashley Swearengin, who was elected to succeed him as mayor.

== Dirt Road Productions ==
In 1997, Autry launched his own production company, Dirt Road Productions. In 2002, he released The Legend of Jake Kincaid, a Western-based on a story he wrote. He was also the director of this film.

== Music ==
Autry and his In the Heat of the Night co-star Randall Franks joined forces under the banner of Autry-Franks Productions to produce the charity In the Heat of the Night CD Christmas Time's A Comin', featuring the cast of the show. The project raised funds for drug-abuse prevention charities. With Franks producing, Autry performed his rendition of "Rudolph the Red-Nosed Reindeer" in homage to Gene Autry.

Franks and Autry both performed on "Jingle Bells" and "Christmas Time's A Comin'". The duo was able to include many music legends, including Kitty Wells, Jimmy Dickens, and Pee Wee King, and many from the bluegrass genre, from Jim & Jesse to The Lewis Family. The Christmas Time's A Comin' CD, released on Sonlite and MGM/UA, was one of the most popular Christmas releases of 1991 and 1992 with Southern retailers.

Crimson Records released their second Autry-Franks Productions project Alan Autry and Randall Franks Mississippi Moon: Country Traditions in 2013, an Americana CD featuring both actors vocally on various classic and original songs. The project, which incorporates country, bluegrass, and Southern gospel, includes special appearances by Bluegrass Hall of Fame members Jim and Jesse McReynolds and three-time Dove Award nominee Mark Wheeler of the Marksmen Quartet.

== Electoral history ==
2000 Fresno mayoral election
| Candidate | First round | | Runoff | |
| Candidate | Votes | % | Votes | % |
|---|---|---|---|---|
| Alan Autry | 22,951 | 28.75 | 66,555 | 61.23 |
| Dan Whitehurst | 22,177 | 27.78 | 41,920 | 38.57 |
| Chris Mathys | 10,503 | 13.16 | | |
| Garry Bredefeld | 10,029 | 12.56 | | |
| Daniel Ronquillo | 7,929 | 9.93 | | |
| Sal Quintero | 5,046 | 6.32 | | |
| Chris Petersen | 699 | 0.88 | | |
| Benjerman J. Raya | 214 | 0.27 | | |
| Michael Eagles | 203 | 0.25 | | |
| Write-ins | 86 | 0.11 | 214 | 0.20 |
| Total | 79,837 | 100 | 108,689 | 100 |

2004 Fresno mayoral election
| Candidate | Votes | % |
|---|---|---|
| Alan Autry (incumbent) | 48,744 | 72.53 |
| Sue Saigal | 13,904 | 20.69 |
| Johnny W. Nelum, Sr. | 2,348 | 3.49 |
| Benjamin Junior Ra | 2,389 | 4.54 |
| Tony Farmer | 813 | 1.21 |
| Barbara Ann Hunt (write-in) | 8 | 0.01 |
| Other write-ins | 225 | 0.33 |
| Total votes | 67,201 | |

Political offices
| Preceded by Jim Patterson | 23rd Mayor of Fresno, California; January 2001 – January 6, 2009 | Succeeded by Ashley Swearengin |
