= Jim Patterson (California politician) =

American politician from California

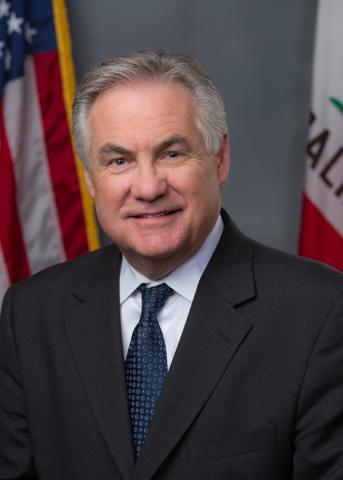

Member of the California Assembly
- In office December 3, 2012 – November 30, 2024
- Preceded by: Linda Halderman (redistricted)
- Succeeded by: David Tangipa
- Constituency: 23rd district (2012–2022); 8th district (2022–2024)

22nd Mayor of Fresno
- In office 1993–2001
- Preceded by: Karen Humphrey
- Succeeded by: Alan Autry

Personal details
- Born: James Norwood Patterson; February 18, 1948 (age 78) San Mateo, California, U.S.
- Party: Republican

James Norwood Patterson (born February 18, 1948) is an American politician who served in the California State Assembly from 2012 to 2024. He represented the 8th district, which encompasses eastern Fresno County, including the cities of Fresno and Clovis, and a small slice of Tulare County. A Republican, he is the former Mayor of Fresno.

== Early career ==
Prior to being elected to public office, he was a business executive and broadcaster owning and operating radio stations in California and Idaho.

== Mayor ==
Patterson was Mayor of Fresno between 1993 and 2001, defeating incumbent Democrat Karen Humphrey for reelection by a landslide, and being succeeded by Alan Autry.

== 2002 Congressional election ==
Patterson ran for the Republican nomination in California's 21st congressional district, a district with new boundaries created through reapportionment after the 2000 United States census. His opponents were State Assemblyman Mike Briggs and Devin Nunes, the California State Director for the United States Department of Agriculture's Rural Development section. Patterson came in close second place to Nunes, who would eventually win the general election.

== 2010 Congressional election ==
Patterson ran for the Republican nomination in California's 19th congressional district, to take over the seat of retiring Congressman George Radanovich. He finished second in the June 8, 2010 primary to state Senator Jeff Denham, who won the general election.

== Political positions ==
In the wake of a 2018 shooting spree in Tulare County by an illegal alien, Patterson called on his fellow legislators to change California Sanctuary Law SB54 to allow local law enforcement agencies to cooperate with detainer requests from U.S. Immigration and Customs Enforcement.

== 2024 election ==
Patterson is barred by term limits from seeking reelection to the state Assembly. He's announced that he plans to run for the Fresno County Board of Supervisors in 2024.

== Electoral history ==
1996 Fresno mayoral election
| Candidate | Votes | % |
|---|---|---|
| Jim Patterson (incumbent) | 36,281 | 53.0 |
| Michael Erin Woody | 24,531 | 35.8 |
| James "Jim" Lanas | 2,125 | 3.1 |
| Lewis A. Jackson | 1,901 | 2.7 |
| Randy Risner | 1,201 | 1.7 |
| Johnny Nelum | 1,068 | 1.5 |
| Michael Eagles | 763 | 1.1 |
| Lawrence A. Cano | 558 | 0.8 |
| Mauro Buzz Gugliemo | 2 | 0.0 |
| Frank Ramirez | 0 | 0.0 |
| Unqualified write-ins | 20 | 0.0 |
| Total votes | 68,450 | 100 |

2002 California's 21st United States House of Representatives district Republican primary
| Party | Candidate | Votes | % |
|---|---|---|---|
| Republican | Devin Nunes | 21,438 | 37.1 |
| Republican | Jim Patterson | 19,099 | 33.0 |
| Republican | Mike Briggs | 14,864 | 25.7 |
| Republican | Tom Wright | 1,413 | 2.5 |
| Republican | Nathan Short | 436 | 0.7 |
| Republican | Richard Morgan | 369 | 0.6 |
| Republican | Greg Ingles | 258 | 0.4 |
| Total votes | | 57,441 | 100 |

2010 California's 19th United States House of Representatives district Republican primary
| Party | Candidate | Votes | % |
|---|---|---|---|
| Republican | Jeff Denham | 26,594 | 36.3 |
| Republican | Jim Patterson | 22,355 | 30.6 |
| Republican | Richard Pombo | 15,196 | 20.7 |
| Republican | Larry Westerlund | 9,126 | 12.4 |
| Total votes | | 73,271 | 100 |

2012 California's 23rd State Assembly district election
Primary election
| Party | Candidate | Votes | % |
|---|---|---|---|
| Republican | Jim Patterson | 30,827 | 39.4 |
| Republican | Bob Whalen | 19,992 | 25.5 |
| Democratic | Richard Rojas | 17,690 | 22.6 |
| Republican | Vong Mouanoutoua | 5,487 | 7.0 |
| Republican | David DeFrank | 4,278 | 5.5 |
| Total votes | | 78,274 | 100.0 |
General election
| Republican | Jim Patterson | 83,817 | 54.7 |
| Republican | Bob Whalen | 69,457 | 45.3 |
| Total votes | | 153,274 | 100.0 |
| Republican hold | | | |

2014 California's 23rd State Assembly district election
Primary election
| Party | Candidate | Votes | % |
|---|---|---|---|
| Republican | Jim Patterson (incumbent) | 55,914 | 100.0 |
| Total votes | | 55,914 | 100.0 |
General election
| Republican | Jim Patterson (incumbent) | 82,417 | 100.0 |
| Total votes | | 82,417 | 100.0 |
| Republican hold | | | |

2016 California's 23rd State Assembly district election
Primary election
| Party | Candidate | Votes | % |
|---|---|---|---|
| Republican | Jim Patterson (incumbent) | 73,686 | 77.4 |
| Republican | Gwen L. Morris | 21,522 | 22.6 |
| Total votes | | 95,208 | 100.0 |
General election
| Republican | Jim Patterson (incumbent) | 125,123 | 75.9 |
| Republican | Gwen L. Morris | 39,656 | 24.1 |
| Total votes | | 164,809 | 100.0 |
| Republican hold | | | |

2018 California's 23rd State Assembly district election
Primary election
| Party | Candidate | Votes | % |
|---|---|---|---|
| Republican | Jim Patterson (incumbent) | 58,927 | 64.9 |
| Democratic | Aileen Rizo | 31,902 | 35.1 |
| Total votes | | 90,829 | 100.0 |
General election
| Republican | Jim Patterson (incumbent) | 98,789 | 59.4 |
| Democratic | Aileen Rizo | 67,443 | 40.6 |
| Total votes | | 166,232 | 100.0 |
| Republican hold | | | |

2020 California's 23rd State Assembly district election
Primary election
| Party | Candidate | Votes | % |
|---|---|---|---|
| Republican | Jim Patterson (incumbent) | 85,465 | 100% |
| Total votes | | | |
| Republican hold | | | |

2022 California's 8th State Assembly district election
Primary election
| Party | Candidate | Votes | % |
|---|---|---|---|
| Republican | Jim Patterson (incumbent) | 91,237 | 100% |
| Libertarian | Thomas Edward Nichols (write-in) | 15 | 0.0 |
| Total votes | | 91,252 | 100% |
General election
| Republican | Jim Patterson (incumbent) | 128,124 | 74.2 |
| Libertarian | Thomas Edward Nichols | 44,451 | 25.8 |
| Total votes | | 172,575 | 100% |
| Republican hold | | | |

== See also ==
- List of mayors of Fresno, California

Political offices
| Preceded by Karen Humphrey | 22nd Mayor of Fresno; 1993–2001 | Succeeded by Alan Autry |
