= Fresno Police Department =

Police department serving the City of Fresno, California

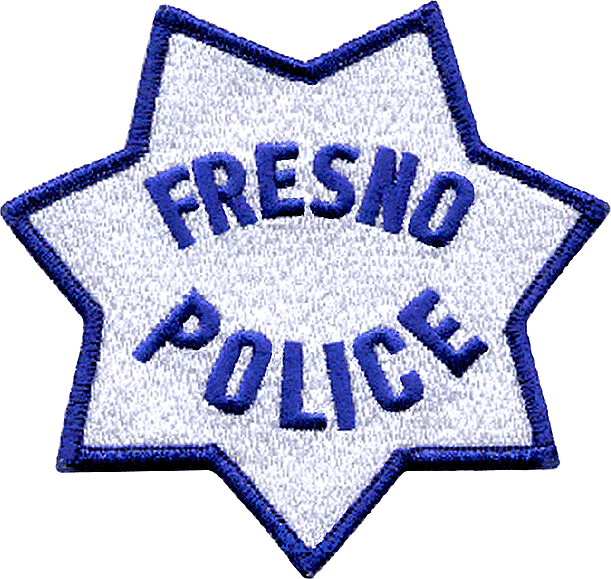
- Patch of the Fresno Police Department

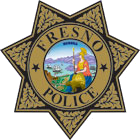
- Seal of the Fresno Police Department

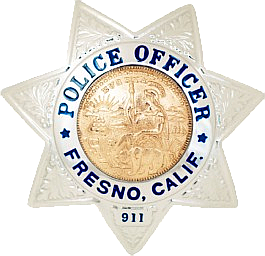
- Badge of the Fresno Police Department

- Flag of Fresno, California
- Common name: Fresno P.D.
- Abbreviation: FPD
- Motto: "Safety, Service and Trust!"

Agency overview
- Employees: 926 (2024)
- Annual budget: $481 million (2024)

Jurisdictional structure
- Operations jurisdiction: Fresno, California, United States
- Area: 104.8 square miles (271 km2)
- Population: 530,073 (2018)
- Legal jurisdiction: City of Fresno
- Governing body: Fresno City Council
- General nature: Local civilian police

Operational structure
- Headquarters: 2323 Mariposa Mall; Fresno, California, U.S.
- Police officers: 811
- Unsworn members: 252
- Agency executive: Mindy Casto, Chief of Police
- Field Operations Divisions: 5: Southwest; Southeast; Northeast; Northwest; Central

Facilities
- Vehicles: 813: Ford Crown Victoria Police Interceptor; Dodge Charger; Dodge Magnum (K9); Special service SUV; Special Service Trucks
- Helicopters: 2
- Planes: 1
- K9s: 14

Website
- www.fresno.gov/police/

The Fresno Police Department (FPD) is the municipal police department for Fresno, California. Their headquarters is located at 2323 Mariposa Mall. Mindy Casto is the current Chief of Police for the Fresno Police Department since June 13, 2024 following a scandal of Former Chief Paco Balderrama who later resigned on June 25, 2024

== Fallen officers ==
Since the establishment of the Fresno Police Department, 15 officers have died in the line of duty.

== Special Units ==
The Fresno Police Department has 11 specialized units which provide support in different situations.

=== DUI Education Program ===
In an effort to reduce traffic violations and vehicle collisions the FPD established the DUI Education Program (DUI stands for: Driving Under the Influence). The DUI Education Program is involved in educating, enforcement and prevention of driving under the influence.

=== Explosive Ordnance Disposal Unit (EOD) ===
The Fresno Police Department's Explosive Ordnance Disposal Unit is a bomb squad established in 1974. The unit is involved in training explosive ordnance technicians.

The unit assisted during the September 11 attacks, going full-time as the city's first Anti-Terrorism Unit. Recent advancements include a new robot, greater detection and disruption capabilities and a total containment vessel.

=== Internal Affairs Bureau ===
The Internal Affairs Bureau investigates allegations of misconduct by members of the FPD.

=== K9 Unit ===
The FPD K9 Unit was established in 1993. The police dogs are utilized every day, assisting patrol and other specialized department units with warrant arrests, building searches, suspect tracking, evidence location, vehicle stops and narcotic searches, accompanied by special units if necessary.

=== Violence Intervention & Community Engagement Unit (VICS) ===
The Violence Intervention & Community Engagement Unit, formerly known as the Mayor's Gang Prevention Initiative, was established in 2006. The objective of this unit is to minimize violence throughout the community and to reduce gang-related crime. VICS is involved in the engagement and services of the community.

=== Mounted Patrol ===
The Fresno Police Department's Mounted Patrol Unit was established in 1999. In 2010, the decision was made to disband the unit, but in the same year, the unit was able to resume its activities due to community contributions. The Mounted Patrol teams patrol public areas on horseback.

=== Skywatch ===
Skywatch was established in 1996. This unit is the Fresno Police Department's Air Support Unit and its helicopter patrol service.

=== Street Violence Unit ===
The Street Violence Unit responds to violence crimes around Fresno. The Street Violence Unit comprises the Homicide Unit, Robbery/Felony Assault Unit, the plain clothes Tactical Team, and the Night Detective Unit.

=== Special Weapons And Tactics (SWAT) ===
The Fresno Police Department SWAT Team supports the Fresno Police Department with a tactical response to critical incidents which are beyond the capabilities of normally equipped and trained Department members.

=== Traffic unit ===
The Department's Traffic unit focuses on traffic safety. The unit is involved in educating drivers about safety and to combat impaired driving.

=== Records & Information Service Bureau ===
The Records and Information Service Bureau maintains reports and records for the Fresno Police Department

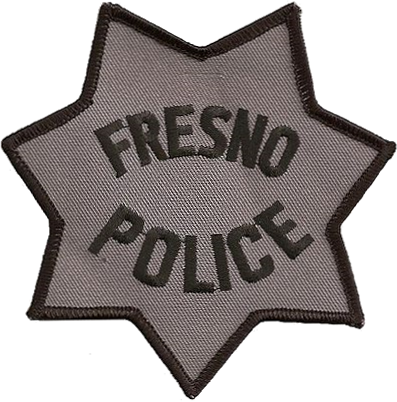
Fresno Police Department tactical patch

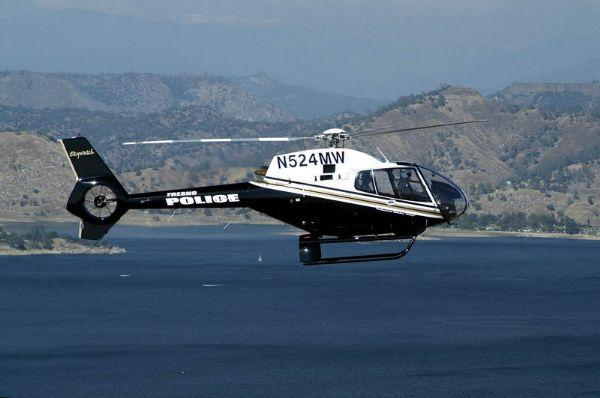
Fresno Police Skywatch

== See also ==
- List of law enforcement agencies in California
