= History of Chinese Americans in Fresno =

The Fresno area population includes a large number of people with Chinese ancestral backgrounds and they were among the first to settle in the area. They faced segregation and formed a Chinatown community on the west side of the Central Pacific Railroad tracks.

== History ==
The 1849-era California Gold Rush drew many Chinese immigrants to the United States, seeking fortune or simply seeking work. War, famine, and a poor economy created difficult living conditions in southeastern China at that time which also spurred the migration. Although these immigrants ended up spreading all over of the United States, some saw mining opportunities in the still largely unsettled Fresno area.

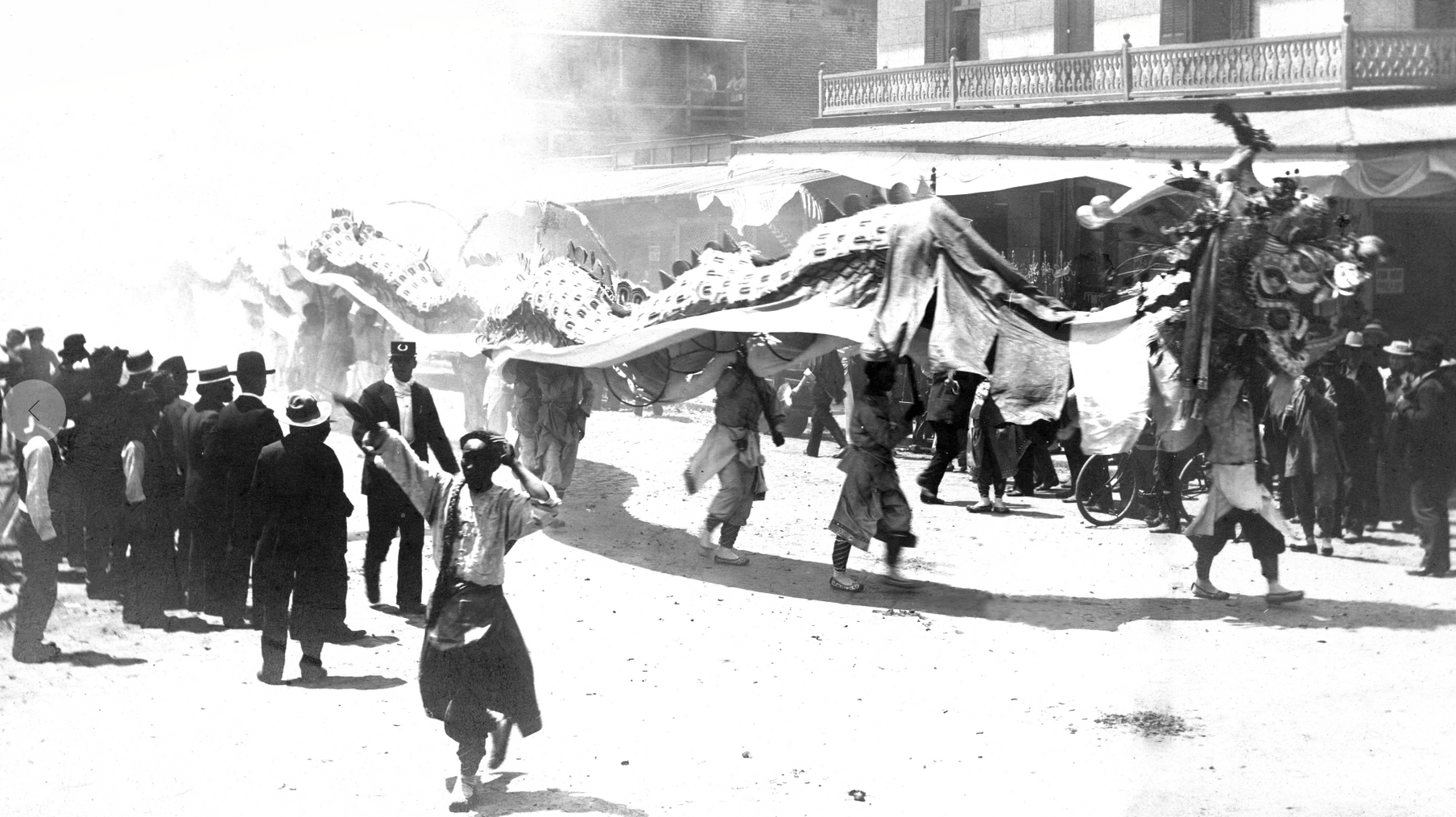
Chinese New Year Celebration in Fresno's Chinatown - early 20th Century

They found early success in the mines along the upper reaches of the San Joaquin River but the 1850 Foreign Miners Tax drove many Chinese from working the mines. Turning to merchant opportunities to make a living, a substantial Chinese community grew in Millerton, the location where San Joaquin River miners stopped before flowing into the mountains and when coming back from them. Chinese in the Millerton settlement still faced considerable hardship, segregated from other settlers. Chinese stores were targeted for looting by desperadoes.

Millerton was named the original county seat of Fresno County in 1856 before the city of Fresno existed but a large flood in 1862 damaged the settlement. Another large flood in 1867 spelled the end of the settlement and most moved down to the Fresno area, which became the new county seat in 1874. When the county seat was moved, 200 of the total Fresno population of 600 were Chinese residents.

=== Fresno Chinatown ===
Many of the Chinese in the Fresno area began to establish new businesses and residences on the west side of the Central Pacific Railroad tracks. The 1898 Sanborn Map generally indicated Chinatown as existing between E, Mariposa, G and Kern Streets. When a Chinese blacksmith attempted to lease a washhouse located outside of this enclave in 1873, a meeting was held to prevent it. Community leaders collected signatures of other residents to pledge to not sell, lease, or rent to Chinese any property on the east side of the railroad track, forming a forcibly segregated area.

The open hostility toward the Chinese extended to an editorial in the Fresno Morning Republican by Dr. Chester Rowell published in 1876 and titled "The Chinese Question." The editorial described the influx of Chinese as "the greatest drawback to the prosperity of the country." This hostility was reflected in federal laws passed during this time, including the Chinese Exclusion Act in 1882 and the Geary Act in 1892.

Nevertheless, Chinatown during the early twentieth-century became a vibrant and resilient community. The few square blocks offered many amenities to the residents including work, food, benevolent associations, entertainment, education, and religious houses. A Chinese theater was located on China Alley and a Joss House (Chinese Temple) faced G Street. Most Chinese worked in local agriculture, farming figs, grapes, cotton and wheat.

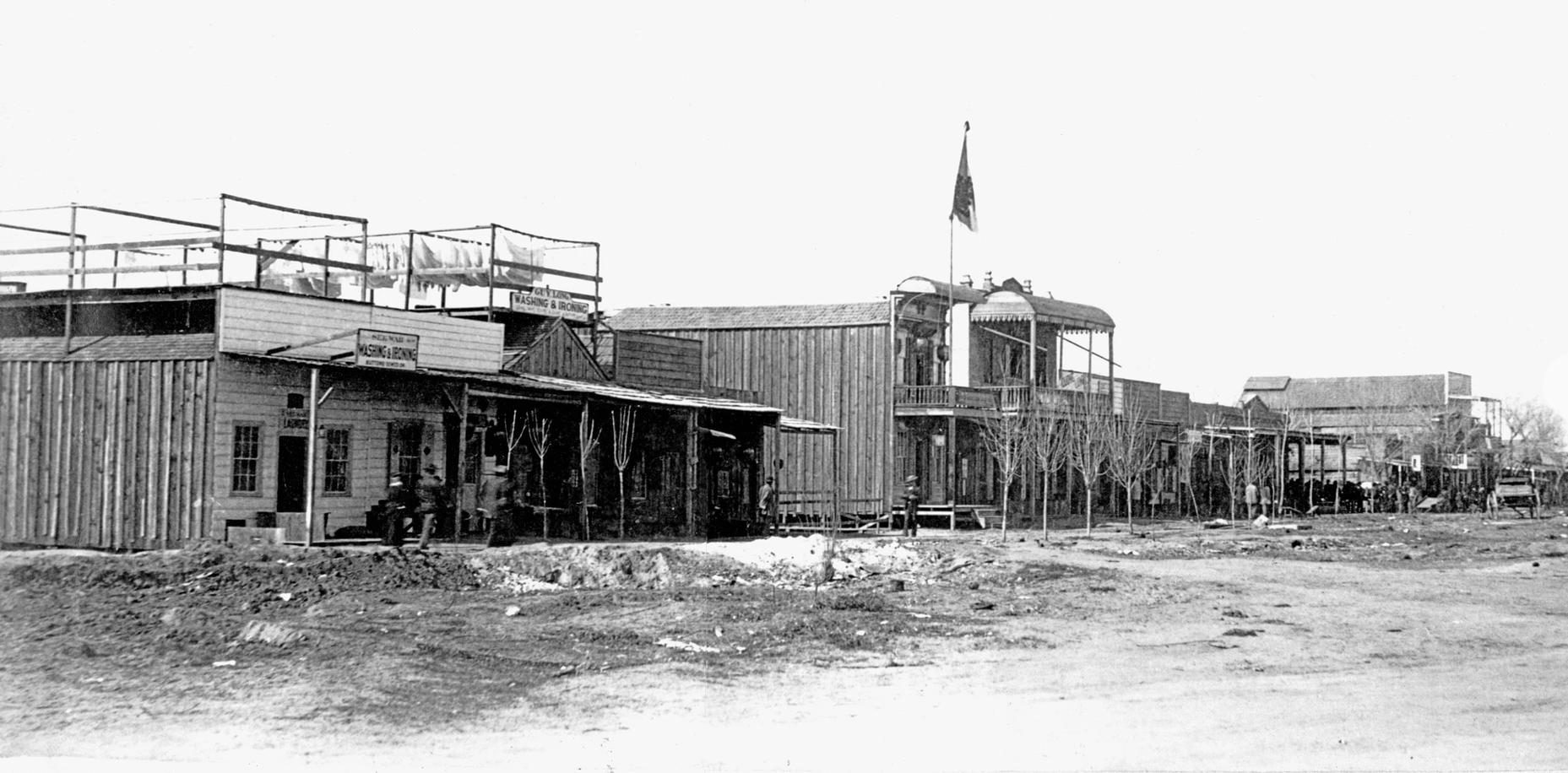
Early photo of Chinatown in Fresno, CA, circa 1880

Similar to the other Chinatowns in California such as in San Francisco, Los Angeles and Oakland, Fresno's Chinatown was regarded as a center of gambling, prostitution, and opium by the public and bore the brunt of many efforts to stifle vice in Fresno. In December 1885, the City of Fresno enacted an ordinance banning the use of Opium. Prostitution stings were also frequent.

Chinatown tunnels were built in an effort to escape from the Fresno heat, hide from police raids, and possibly travel to other parts of the town secretly. One tunnel originated from a fish company storage room, through a door and descended down a case of stairs. Excavation and exploration of these tunnels occurred during the construction of the California High-Speed Rail, routed through Fresno. Some tours of the tunnels have been conducted to allow the public to experience them.

The 1960s saw an effort at urban renewal in Fresno, which led to the demolition of Chinatown buildings and the displacement of residents. Decline of the area as a cultural enclave followed. The under-construction California High-Speed Rail route impinges on the Fresno Chinatown area but there are ongoing efforts to revitalize it.
