= George H. Conley =

American educator

- Born: October 11, 1853
- Died: December 20, 1905 (aged 52)
- Education: College of the Holy Cross (BA); Saint-Sulpice Seminary
- Occupation: Educator

George H. Conley (October 11, 1853 – December 20, 1905) was an American educator who served as superintendent of Lowell and Boston Public Schools.

== Early life ==
Conley was born on October 11, 1853, in Lowell, Massachusetts. He attended Lowell Public Schools and graduated from the College of the Holy Cross in 1874. He studied for the priesthood at Saint-Sulpice Seminary in Montreal, but ill health forced him to return to Lowell and seek a less strenuous career, which led him to teaching.

== Career ==
In 1876, Conley was appointed principal of the Horace Mann Grammar School in Lowell. He was transferred to the Butler School when it opened in 1883. On April 10, 1884, he was elected superintendent of schools. In 1886 he resigned to become a supervisor of schools in Boston. In 1893 he was appointed to the Massachusetts Board of Education. On July 12, 1904, he was elected superintendent of schools. On the morning of December 20, 1905, Conley, who had been in poor health, died at his home in Brookline, Massachusetts.

Educational offices
Preceded by Charles Morrill	Superintendent of Lowell Public Schools; 1884–1886	Succeeded by George F. Lawton
Preceded by Edwin P. Seaver	Superintendent of Boston Public Schools; 1904–1905	Succeeded by Stratton D. Brooks
