= Leslie A. Simpson =

American politician (1868–1926)

President pro tempore of the North Dakota Senate
- In office 1909–1911
- Preceded by: John A. Regan
- Succeeded by: Charles W. Plain

Member of the North Dakota Senate from the 31st district
- In office 1901–1913
- Preceded by: Alexander C. McGillivray
- Succeeded by: Morton L. McBride

Member of the North Dakota House of Representatives from the 31st district
- In office 1893–1897
- Preceded by: Jefferson A. Farrah
- Succeeded by: Alfred White

Personal details
- Born: December 7, 1868 Deer Isle, Maine, U.S.
- Died: September 29, 1926 (aged 57) Dickinson, North Dakota, U.S.
- Party: Republican
- Spouse: Rosaline Messersmith (m. 1891)
- Occupation: Attorney

Leslie A. Simpson (December 7, 1868 – September 29, 1926) was an American attorney and politician who was the president pro tempore of the North Dakota Senate from 1909 to 1911.

== Early life ==
Simpson was born on December 7, 1868 in Deer Isle, Maine. He resided in Portland, Maine from the age of nine until 1886, when he entered the University of Minnesota. He read law in the office of George P. Flannery in Minneapolis and was admitted to the Minnesota bar in 1889. In 1891, he married Rosaline Messersmith.

== Legal career ==
In 1889, Simpson moved to Dickinson, North Dakota and opened a law office. The office remains in business today as the Mackoff Kellogg Law Firm. He was disbarred in 1900 for unprofessional conduct, but was reinstated three years later. In 1909, he represented a Dickinson man claiming to be the missing son of Massachusetts legislator and businessman Daniel Russell. The Russell will case went on until the following April, during which time 205 witnesses were called, 346 exhibits were presented, and a stenographic record of 11,400 pages was produced. The New York Times called it "the most dramatic will case in Boston's history". Judge George F. Lawton ruled that Simpson's client was an impostor named James D. Ruseau and dismissed his claims to the Russell estate. In 1921, Simpson was appointed by Governor Lynn Frazier to prosecute D. R. Offley for the murder of M. K. Bowen. Offley was acquitted. That same year, Simpson and former Stark County sheriff T. N. Hartung were charged with obstruction of justice for allegedly assisting a pair of accused boxcar robbers evade justice by encouraging them to join the United States Army during World War I. The case was dismissed the following year by Judge Andrew Miller.

== Politics ==
Simpson was elected to the North Dakota House of Representatives in 1892 and served two terms. From 1896 to 1900, he was the state's attorney for Stark County. During the Spanish–American War, he was a member of the 3rd United States Volunteer Cavalry Regiment, also known as Grigsby's Cowboys. He was chairman of the 1900 Republican state convention. In 1904, he was appointed to the newly-created position of receiver of public moneys in Dickinson by President Theodore Roosevelt.

Simpson represented the Thirty-First Legislative District in the North Dakota Senate during the seventh, eighth, ninth, tenth, eleventh, and twelfth legislative assemblies. From 1909 to 1911, he was president pro tempore of the North Dakota Senate.

Simpson was a Republican candidate for the United States House of Representatives seat in North Dakota's 3rd congressional district in 1912 and 1914, losing the nomination both times to Patrick Norton.

== Business ==
Simpson was active in the early development of Dickinson and Stark County. He helped organized and for a time was president of the Gladstone State Bank in Gladstone, North Dakota. He also helped organize the Farmers State Bank in Dickinson and was its vice president. He was an organizer of the Missouri Slope Land and Investment Company, which purchased 120,000 acres of land in western North Dakota for development. At the time of his death, Simpson was one of the largest landowners in the state and also had extensive real estate holdings in Florida.

== Death ==
Simpson suffered a minor heart attack on September 26, 1926. He recovered and returned to work the following day. He suffered another heart attack on September 28 and died the following morning from heart disease.
