= Senator Simpson =

Senator Simpson may refer to:

== Members of the United States Senate ==
- Alan Simpson (American politician) (born 1931), U.S. Senator from Wyoming from 1979 to 1997
- Milward Simpson (1897–1993), U.S. Senator from Wyoming from 1962 to 1967

== United States state senate members ==
- Alexander Simpson (politician) (1872–1953), New Jersey State Senate
- Cleave Simpson (born 1960/61), Colorado State Senate
- Daniel R. Simpson (1927–2015), North Carolina State Senate
- Deborah Simpson (fl. 2000s–2010s), Maine State Senate
- Edward B. Simpson (1835–1915), Wisconsin State Senate
- F. Gary Simpson (fl. 1990s–2010s), Delaware State Senate
- Frank Simpson (politician) (born 1945), Oklahoma State Senate
- George W. Simpson (1870–1951), New York State Senate
- Harold D. Simpson (1926–2001), Nebraska State Senate
- John Simpson (Kansas politician) (born 1934), Kansas State Senate
- Joseph W. Simpson (1870–1944), Maine State Senate
- Leslie A. Simpson (1868–1926), North Dakota State Senate
- Philemon Simpson (1819–1895), Wisconsin State Senate
- Richard F. Simpson (1798–1882), South Carolina State Senate
- Vi Simpson (born 1946), Indiana State Senate
- William T. Simpson (1886–1980), New York State Senate
- Wilton Simpson (born 1966), Florida State Senate
