= Fresno Morning Republican =

Defunct Fresno newspaper

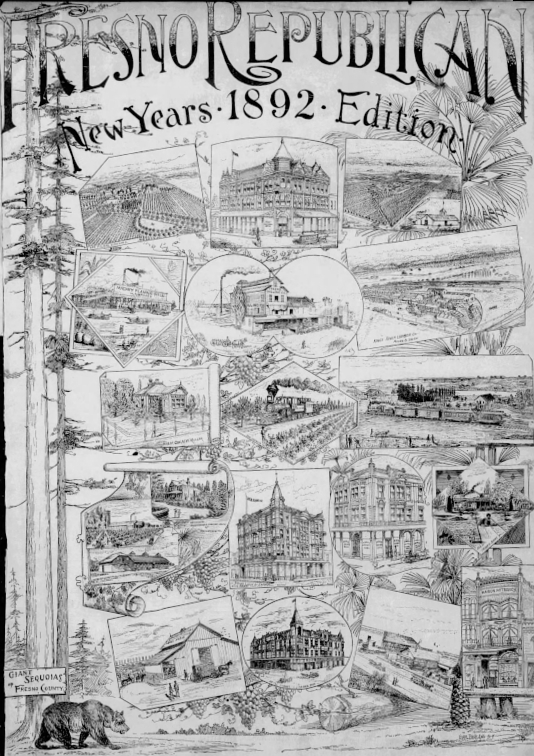
- Cover page of the Fresno Republican newspaper on New Year's Day 1892
- Type: Daily newspaper
- Owner: Chester Rowell
- Founded: September 23, 1876; 150 years ago
- Ceased publication: 1932
- Political alignment: Progressive
- Headquarters: Fresno, California
- OCLC number: 30442762

The Fresno Morning Republican (also known as the Fresno Republican, Fresno Weekly Republican or the Fresno Daily Republican) was a newspaper serving Fresno, California from 1876 through 1932. It was founded by Dr. Chester Rowell and operated by his nephew, Chester Harvey Rowell.

== History ==
=== Beginnings ===
The newspaper began on Sept. 23, 1876, when Dr. Chester Rowell, a local physician and politician, published 750 copies of the Fresno Weekly Republican.

When the weekly paper became a daily morning publication 11 years later, Rowell renamed it The Fresno Morning Republican. Rowell, one of the few Republicans in Fresno at the time, named his newspaper to reflect his political stance.

Rowell was inspired by the Massachusetts-based Springfield Republican. He wanted to emulate the way the Springfield Republican served as a venue for analysis and public discussion of political economics in its region.

William Glass became the business manager in 1890 and stabilized operations. By syndicating the Associated News service in their paper, they helped rural Fresno County remain connected to the nation and world at large.

=== Advocacy and growth ===
In 1898, the paper had a circulation of less than 3,000 and the operation was worth less than the loans taken out for it. Dr. Rowell offered the managing editor job to his nephew, Chester Harvey Rowell, who at that point in his career had earned a doctoral degree from the University of Michigan, worked as a clerk in the U.S. House of Representatives, traveled to Europe and taught in Kansas, Wisconsin and Illinois. The younger Rowell had limited ties to California but had followed the politics from afar and had acquired hostility towards the Southern Pacific Railroad company.

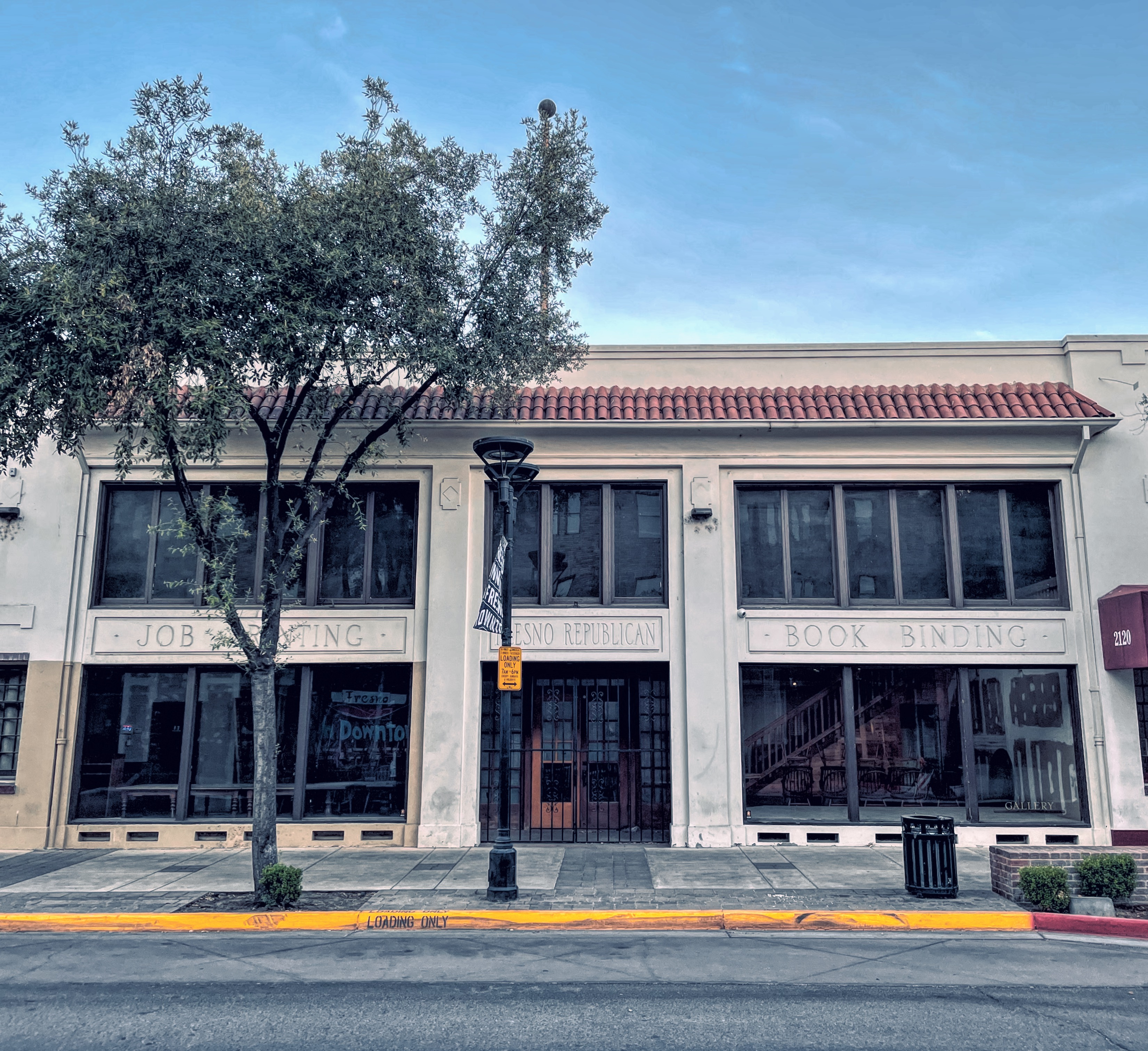
1919 printery building

As editor, Rowell oversaw the growth of the paper as a source of local news but he also penned and printed his own editorials. His editorial critiques focused on vice, liquor, crime and crooked politics in Fresno and California in general. He led a drive to clean up Fresno's corruption and encouraged city leaders to write a city charter. The charter became a reality in 1899.

Expanding his scope statewide, Rowell formed the Lincoln–Roosevelt League and began a political reform effort, targeting the Southern Pacific Railroad in particular. The paper's political stance was Progressive, which meant that it lent support to politicians such as Theodore Roosevelt, Robert M. La Follette and Hiram Johnson.

In 1920, the paper was bought by George A. Osborn and Chase Osborn Jr. of the Fresno Herald, an afternoon daily. The sale price exceeded $1,000,000.

From 1922 through 1930, the paper sponsored a countywide tennis tournament.

=== Takeover by the Fresno Bee ===
James McClatchy's Sacramento Bee had been publishing in California since 1857. McClatchy's sons, CK and Valentine Stuart, looked to expand their business and founded the Fresno Bee in 1922. CK's son Carlos McClatchy became the Fresno Bee's first editor. They followed by founding the Modesto Bee in 1924. These newspapers formed the basis of what became the McClatchy Company.

In the 1920s, the Fresno Bee competed with the Fresno Morning Republican, although the Bee differentiated itself by distributing in the afternoon as opposed to the morning. In 1932, the Fresno Bee bought out the Morning Republican and took over the subscription lists and merged the newspapers. The Republican printed its last issue on March 21, 1932, after publishing for 56 years. For many years, The Republican's name remained on the Fresno Bee's masthead.

The Morning Republican's former offices at the southern corner of the intersection of Tulare Street and Van Ness Avenue were sold to a furniture store in 1935. The building was remodeled and its brick exterior was covered in stucco but sat vacant for many years and was torn down in 2004.

== Legacy ==
In 1964, Chester Harvey Rowell was posthumously inducted into the California Newspaper Hall of Fame.

== Notable staff ==
- Frank A. Homan, mayor of Fresno from 1937 to 1941, worked as a reporter for the Morning Republican.

== See also ==
- Fresno Republican Printery Building
- Timeline of Fresno, California
