= George F. Lawton =

George Field Lawton (October 17, 1845 – July 17, 1925) was an American jurist who was a justice of the Middlesex County, Massachusetts probate court from 1894 until his death in 1925.

== Biography ==
Lawton was born in Lowell, Massachusetts on October 17, 1845. He served in the 6th Massachusetts Militia Regiment during the American Civil War. He graduated from Williams College in 1868 and was a schoolmaster in Lowell for five years. He was admitted to the bar in 1877 and was city solicitor of Lowell from 1880 to 1882 and 1885 to 1886. In 1886, he was appointed superintendent of Lowell Public Schools. He succeeded George H. Conley, who took a position in the Boston Public Schools. Lawton declined reappointment in 1891 to return to the practice of law.

On September 13, 1894, he was appointed to the Middlesex probate court by Governor Frederic T. Greenhalge. He presided over the Russell will case, which lasted 118 days, saw 205 witnesses called and 346 exhibits presented, and produced a stenographic record of 11,400 pages. Lawton ruled that the claimant to the Russell estate was not the missing son of Daniel Russell, but instead an imposter named James D. Ruseau. Following the decision, a crowd of around 1,000 supporters of the claimant gathered in Melrose, Massachusetts and burned an effigy of Lawton outside of the Russell home.

On July 17, 1925, Lawton drowned in Herring Pond near his country estate in Eastham, Massachusetts. He is interred in the Lawton family mausoleum in Lowell Cemetery alongside his wife, daughter, and sister-in-law.
