= George W. Cartwright =

American politician (1863–1939)

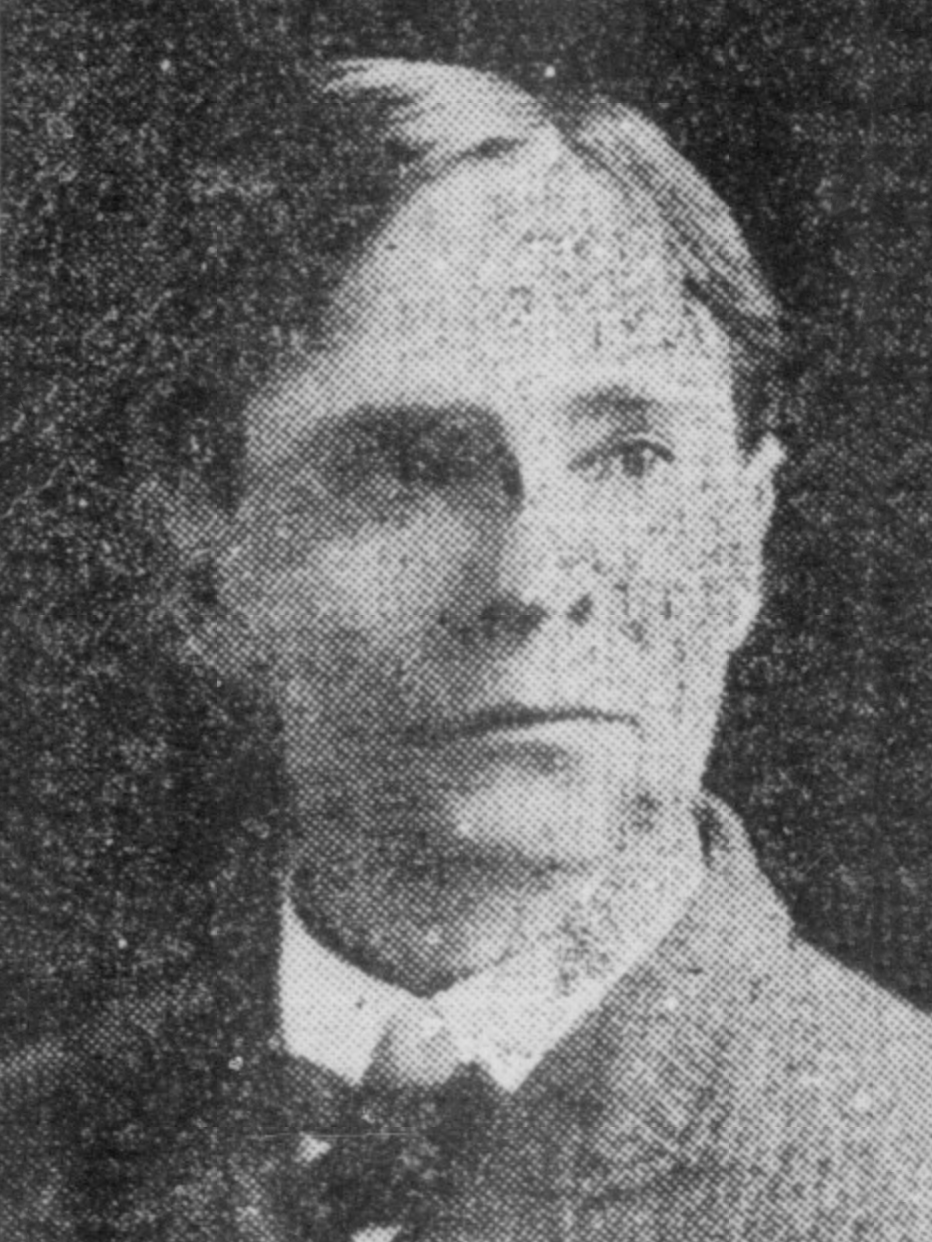

Member of the California State Senate from the 26th district
- In office 1907–1915
- Preceded by: Chester Rowell
- Succeeded by: W. F. Chandler

Member of the California State Senate from the 62nd district
- In office 1897–1899
- Preceded by: Nathan LaFayette Bachman
- Succeeded by: John M. Griffin

Personal details
- Born: George Wilder Cartwright; November 9, 1863 Coles County, Illinois, U.S.
- Died: November 23, 1939 (aged 76) Los Angeles, California, U.S.
- Resting place: Mountain View Cemetery; Fresno, California
- Party: Democratic
- Other political affiliations: People's Party
- Spouse: Rosa S. Otto (m. 1889)
- Children: Hazel

George Wilder Cartwright (November 9, 1863 – November 23, 1939) was an American politician and attorney who served in both houses of the California State Legislature.

== Early life ==
Cartwright was born on November 9, 1863 in Coles County, Illinois. His grandfather, Reddick Cartwright, fought in Battle of New Orleans and was one of the first white settlers of Sangamon County, Illinois. His father, Rev. John Cartwright, was a Baptist minister who fought in the American Civil War. The family moved from Illinois to Colusa County, California in 1869. In 1885, John Cartwright purchased a 40-acre property outside of Malaga, California, where he operated a vineyard.

George W. Cartwright attended public school in Willows, California and studied under professor J. L. Wilson in Colusa County. From 1885 to 1894, he taught in the Fresno County public schools. On December 24, 1889, he married Rosa S. Otto of Wisconsin in Fresno, California. They had one daughter, Hazel.

== Business ==
In 1889, John Cartwright began manufacturing a unique brand of pruning shears. The business was continued by George W. Cartwright and his brother, John M. Cartwright, under the name J. Cartwright & Sons. He also served as secretary and business manager of the Malaga Packing Association for four years. In June 1912, he was elected president of Pacific National Insurance. He gave up his law practice later that year to focus on his duties at Pacific National.

== Politics ==
In 1894, Cartwright was the People's Party nominee for Fresno County superintendent of schools, but lost to Republican Thomas J. Kirk. In 1896, he was elected on the Fusion ticket to represent California's 62nd State Assembly district. During his single term in the California State Assembly, Cartwright authored an income tax bill and introduced a resolution to amend the Constitution of California to eliminate the poll tax, although both were defeated on a party-line vote. In 1898, he was elected county clerk on the Democratic and People's tickets. In 1903, he left politics to practice law. He was admitted to the bar on March 12, 1903. He was the legal counsel for "Fresno Dan" during the Russell will case. From 1907 to 1915, Cartwright was a member of the California State Senate. He authored California's antitrust law, the Cartwright Act.

== Later life ==
After leaving the Senate, Cartwright wrote on industry and labor and made numerous public speaking appearances, including a lecture tour in favor of the open shop. He died on November 23, 1939 at his home in Los Angeles of a heart ailment.
