= Progressivism in the United States =

Political philosophy and reform movement

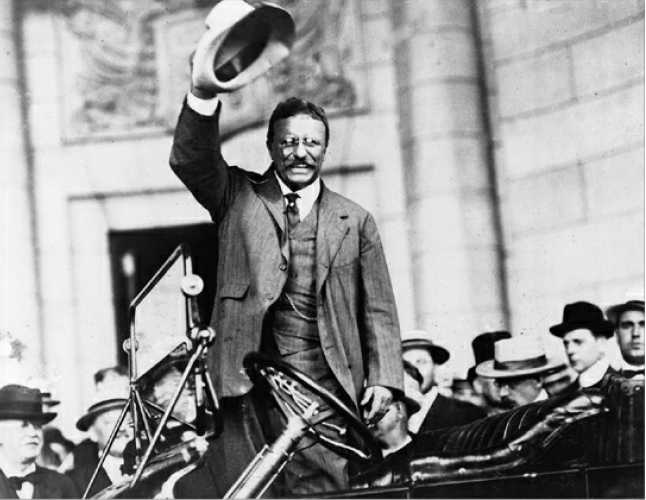
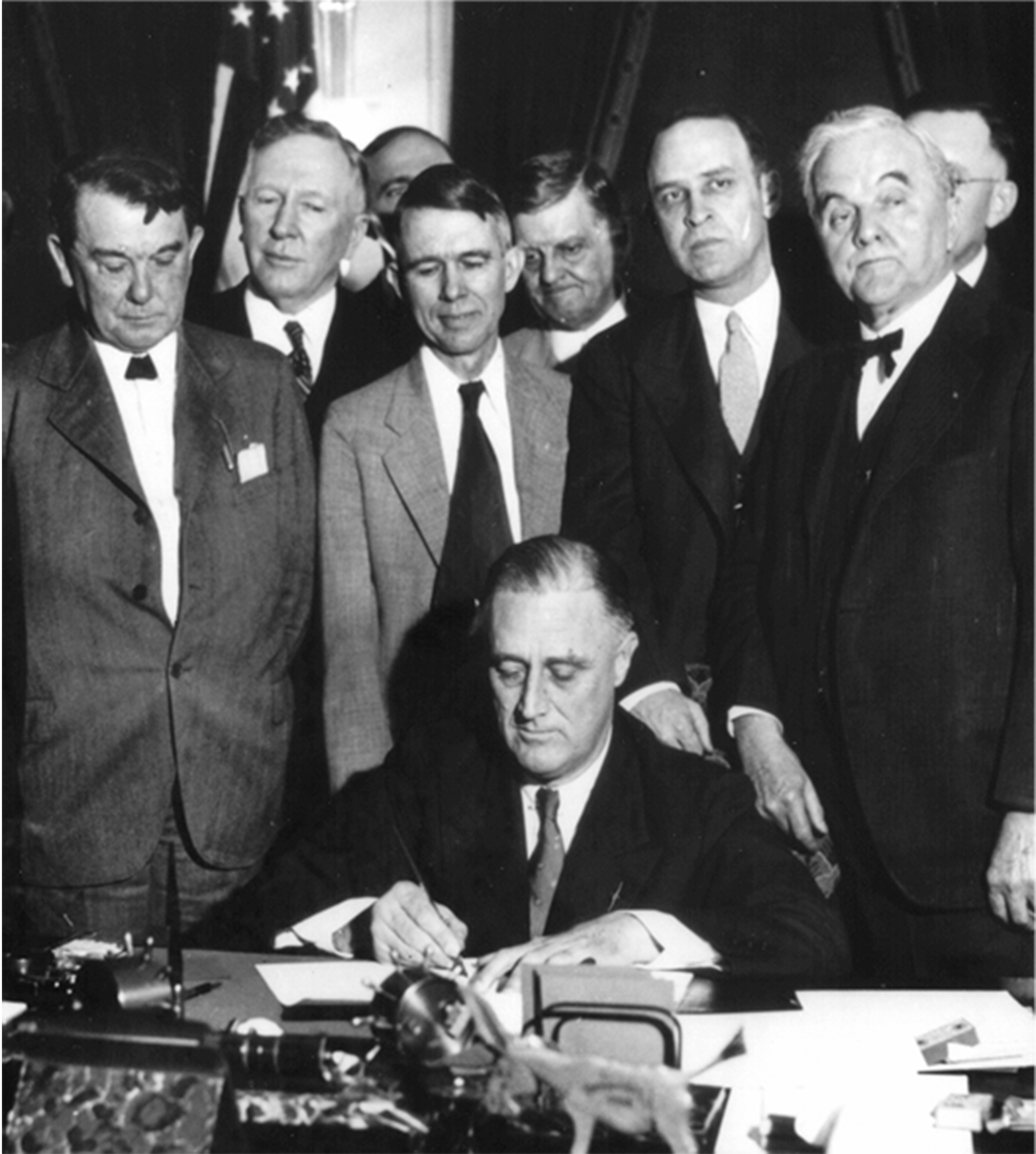
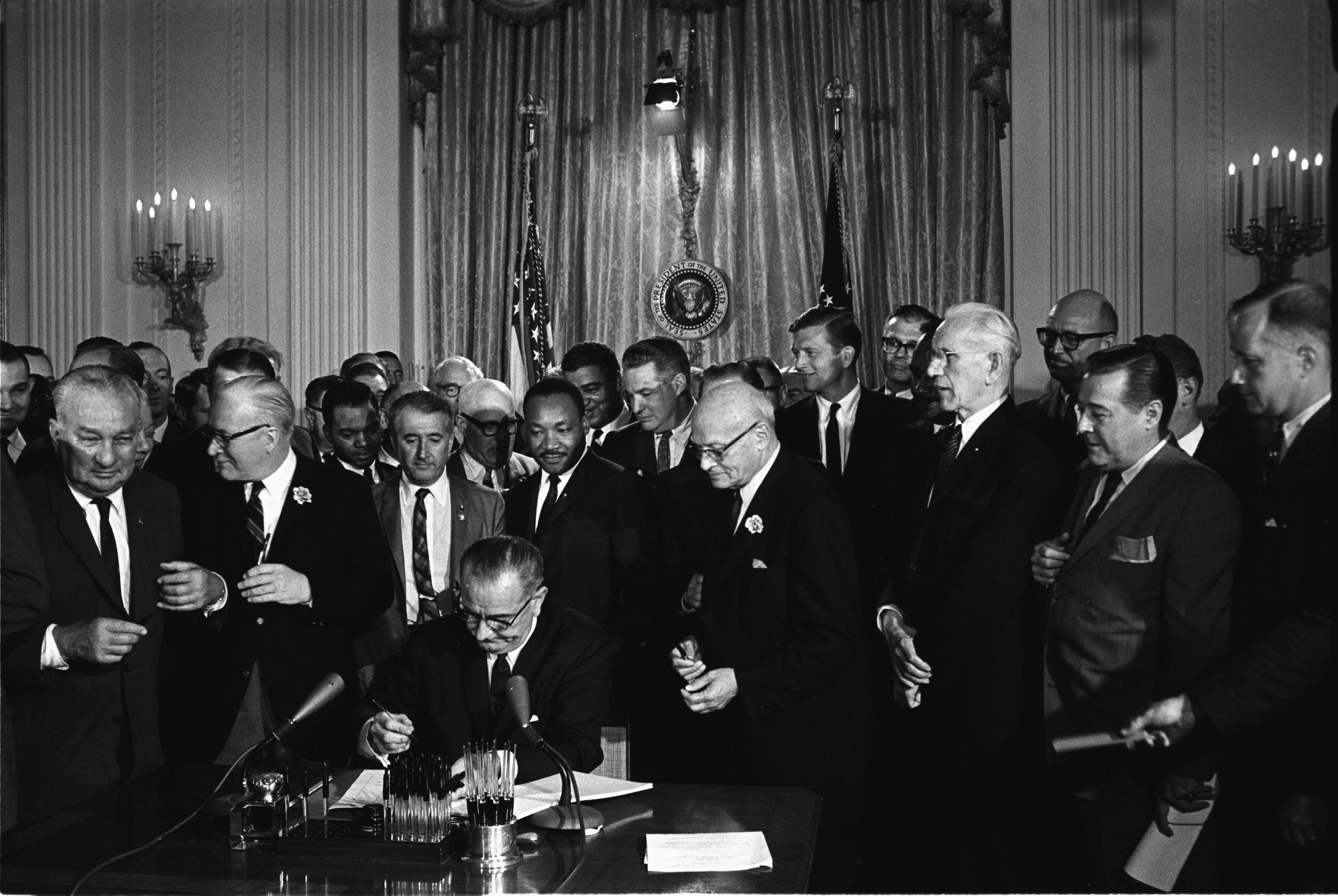
Clockwise from top:
- Theodore Roosevelt visits D.C. in 1914
- Franklin D. Roosevelt signing the TVA Act
- Senator Bernie Sanders and Congresswoman Alexandria Ocasio-Cortez speaking with attendees at a Fighting Oligarchy tour rally at Mullett Arena in Tempe, Arizona
- Lyndon B. Johnson signing the Civil Rights Act of 1964 with Martin Luther King, Jr. standing behind him

Progressivism in the United States is a left-leaning political philosophy and reform movement. Into the 21st century, it advocates policies that are generally considered social democratic and part of the American Left. It has also expressed itself and interacted with some variants of conservative politics, such as in New Nationalism and progressive conservatism. It reached its height early in the 20th century. Middle, working class and reformist in nature, it arose as a response to the vast changes brought by modernization, such as the growth of large corporations, pollution, and corruption in American politics.

Progressive economic policies incorporate the socioeconomic principles of social democracy and the concept of social justice, having the goal of improving the human condition through government regulation, social protections, and the maintenance of public goods. Economic progressivism is based on the idea that capitalist markets left to operate with limited government regulation are inherently unfair, favoring big business, large corporations, and the wealthy. Specific economic policies that are considered progressive include progressive taxes, income redistribution aimed at reducing inequalities of wealth, a comprehensive package of public services, universal health care, resisting involuntary unemployment, public education, social security, minimum wage laws, antitrust laws, legislation protecting labor rights, and the rights of labor unions. While the contemporary progressive movement may be characterized as largely secular in nature, the progressivism of the Progressive Era was by comparison to a significant extent rooted in and energized by religion.

== 20th century: Progressive Era ==
Historians debate the exact contours, but they generally date the Progressive Era in response to the excesses of the Gilded Age from the 1890s to either World War I in 1917 or the onset of the Great Depression in the United States in 1929. Many of the core principles of the progressive movement focused on the need for efficiency in all areas of society, and for greater democratic control over public policy. Purification to eliminate waste and corruption was a powerful element as well as the progressives' support of worker compensation, improved child labor laws, minimum wage legislation, a limited workweek, graduated income tax and allowing women the right to vote. Arthur S. Link and Vincent P. De Santis argue that the majority of progressives wanted to purify politics. For some Progressives, purification meant taking the vote away from blacks in the South.

=== Large corporations and monopolies: trust busting vs. regulation ===
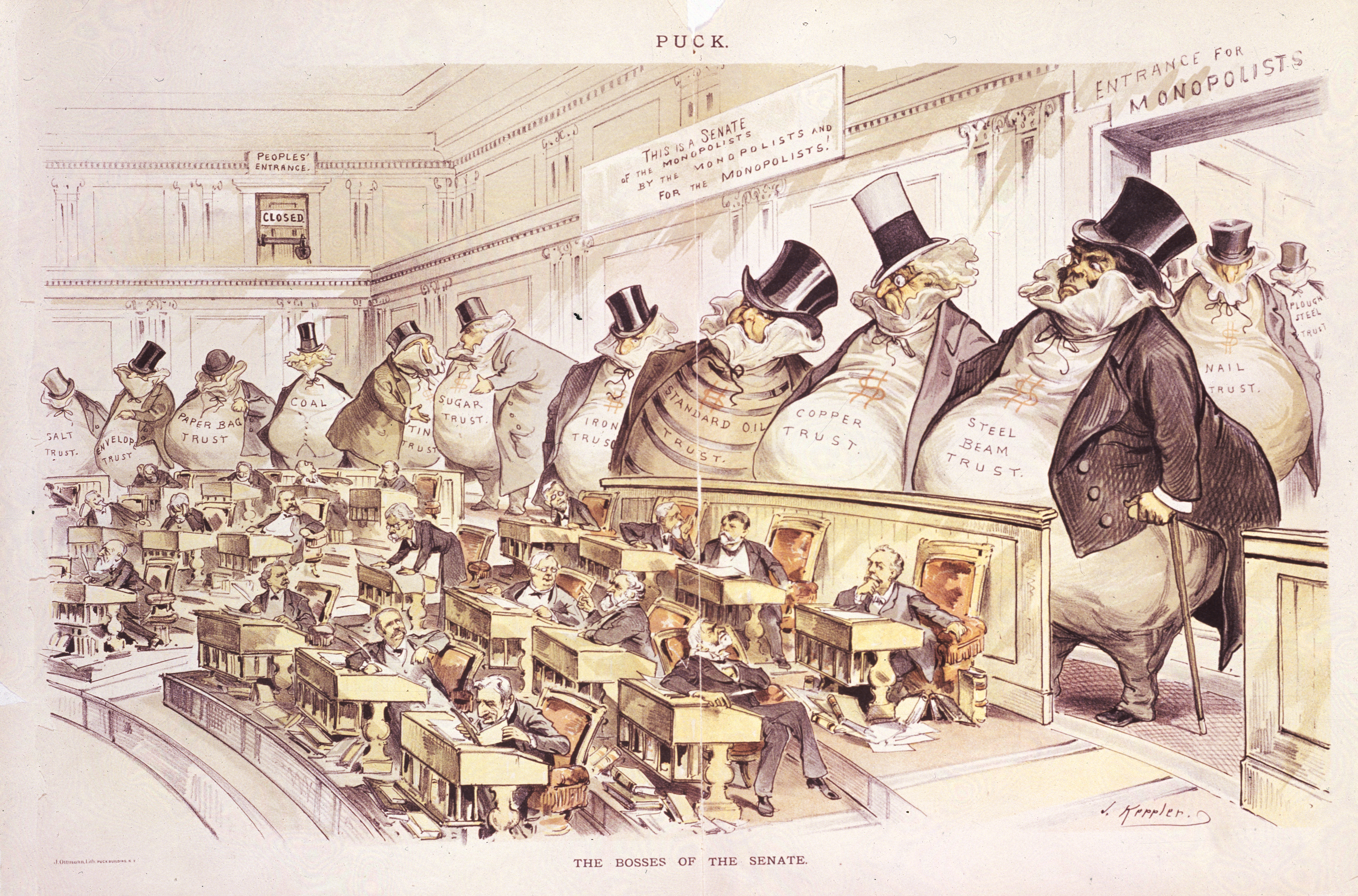
The Bosses of the Senate, a cartoon by Joseph Keppler depicting corporate interests—from steel, copper, oil, iron, sugar, tin, and coal to paper bags, envelopes and salt—as giant money bags looming powerfully over the tiny, weak U.S. Senators

Most progressives hoped that by regulating large corporations they could liberate human energies from the restrictions imposed by industrial capitalism. Nonetheless, the progressive movement was split over which of the following solutions should be used to regulate corporations. Many progressives argued that industrial monopolies were unnatural economic institutions which suppressed the competition which was necessary for progress and improvement. United States antitrust law prohibits anti-competitive behavior (monopoly) and unfair business practices. Presidents such as Theodore Roosevelt and William Howard Taft supported trust-busting. During their presidencies, the otherwise-conservative Taft brought down 90 trusts in four years while Roosevelt took down 44 in seven and a half years in office.

Progressives, such as Benjamin Parke De Witt, argued that, in a modern economy, large corporations and even monopolies were both inevitable and desirable. He argued that with their massive resources and economies of scale, large corporations offered the United States advantages which smaller companies could not offer. However, these large corporations might abuse their great power. The federal government should allow these companies to exist, but otherwise regulate them for the public interest. President Roosevelt generally supported this idea and incorporated it as part of his "New Nationalism".

=== Efficiency ===
Many progressives such as Louis Brandeis hoped to make American governments better able to serve the people's needs by making governmental operations and services more efficient and rational. Rather than making legal arguments against ten-hour workdays for women, he used "scientific principles" and data produced by social scientists documenting the high costs of long working hours for both individuals and society. The progressives' quest for efficiency was sometimes at odds with the progressives' quest for democracy. Taking power out of the hands of elected officials and placing that power in the hands of professional administrators reduced the voice of the politicians and in turn reduced the voice of the people. Centralized decision-making by trained experts and reduced power for local wards made government less corrupt but more distant and isolated from the people it served. Progressives who emphasized the need for efficiency typically argued that trained independent experts could make better decisions than the local politicians. In his influential Drift and Mastery (1914) stressing the "scientific spirit" and "discipline of democracy", Walter Lippmann called for a strong central government guided by experts rather than public opinion.

One example of progressive reform was the rise of the city manager system in which paid, professional engineers ran the day-to-day affairs of city governments under guidelines established by elected city councils. Many cities created municipal "reference bureaus" which did expert surveys of government departments looking for waste and inefficiency. After in-depth surveys, local and even state governments were reorganized to reduce the number of officials and to eliminate overlapping areas of authority between departments. City governments were reorganized to reduce the power of local ward bosses and to increase the powers of the city council. Governments at every level began developing budgets to help them plan their expenditures rather than spending money haphazardly as needs arose and revenue became available. Governor Frank O. Lowden of Illinois showed a "passion for efficiency" as he streamlined state government.

=== Anti-corruption ===
Corruption represented a source of waste and inefficiency in the government. William Simon U'Ren in Oregon, Robert M. La Follette in Wisconsin and others worked to clean up state and local governments by passing laws to weaken the power of machine politicians and political bosses. In Wisconsin, La Follette pushed through an open primary system that stripped party bosses of the power to pick party candidates. The Oregon System included a "Corrupt Practices Act", a public referendum and a state-funded voter's pamphlet, among other reforms which were exported to other states in the Northwest and Midwest. Its high point was in 1912, after which they detoured into a disastrous third party status.

=== Education reform ===
Early progressive thinkers such as John Dewey and Lester Frank Ward placed a universal and comprehensive system of education at the top of the progressive agenda, reasoning that if a democracy were to be successful, its leaders, the general public, needed a good education. Progressives worked hard to expand and improve public and private education at all levels. They believed that modernization of society necessitated the compulsory education of all children, even if the parents objected. Progressives turned to educational researchers to evaluate the reform agenda by measuring numerous aspects of education, later leading to standardized testing. Many educational reforms and innovations generated during this period continued to influence debates and initiatives in American education for the remainder of the 20th century. One of the most apparent legacies of the Progressive Era left to American education was the perennial drive to reform schools and curricula, often as the product of energetic grass-roots movements in the city.

Since progressivism was and continues to be "in the eyes of the beholder", progressive education encompasses very diverse and sometimes conflicting directions in educational policy. Such enduring legacies of the Progressive Era continue to interest historians. Progressive Era reformers stressed "object teaching", meeting the needs of particular constituencies within the school district, equal educational opportunity for boys and girls and avoiding corporal punishment.

David Gamson examines the implementation of progressive reforms in three city school districts—Denver, Colorado; Seattle, Washington and Oakland, California—during 1900–1928. Historians of educational reform during the Progressive Era tend to highlight the fact that many progressive policies and reforms were very different and at times even contradictory. At the school district level, contradictory reform policies were often especially apparent, though there is little evidence of confusion among progressive school leaders in Denver, Seattle and Oakland. District leaders in these cities, including Frank B. Cooper in Seattle and Fred M. Hunter in Oakland, often employed a seemingly contradictory set of reforms. Local progressive educators consciously sought to operate independently of national progressive movements as they preferred reforms that were easy to implement and were encouraged to mix and blend diverse reforms that had been shown to work in other cities.

The reformers emphasized professionalization and bureaucratization. The old system whereby ward politicians selected school employees was dropped in the case of teachers and replaced by a merit system requiring a college-level education in a normal school (teacher's college). The rapid growth in size and complexity the large urban school systems facilitated stabilized employment for women teachers and provided senior teachers greater opportunities to mentor younger teachers. By 1900, most women in Providence, Rhode Island, remained as teachers for at least 17.5 years, indicating teaching had become a significant and desirable career path for women.

=== Culture and social work ===
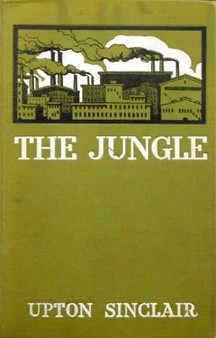
Upton Sinclair's The Jungle exposed Americans to the horrors of the Chicago meatpacking plants.

The foundation of the progressive tendency was indirectly linked to the unique philosophy of pragmatism which was primarily developed by John Dewey and William James. Equally significant to progressive-era reform were the crusading journalists known as muckrakers. These journalists publicized to middle class readers economic privilege, political corruption and social injustice. Their articles appeared in McClure's Magazine and other reform periodicals. Some muckrakers focused on corporate abuses. Ida Tarbell exposed the activities of the Standard Oil Company. In The Shame of the Cities (1904), Lincoln Steffens dissected corruption in city government. In Following the Color Line (1908), Ray Stannard Baker criticized race relations. Other muckrakers assailed the Senate, railroad companies, insurance companies and fraud in patent medicine.

Novelists criticized corporate injustices. Theodore Dreiser drew harsh portraits of a type of ruthless businessman in The Financier (1912) and The Titan (1914). In The Jungle (1906), socialist Upton Sinclair repelled readers with descriptions of Chicago's meatpacking plants and his work led to support for remedial food safety legislation. Leading intellectuals also shaped the progressive mentality. In Dynamic Sociology (1883), Lester Frank Ward laid out the philosophical foundations of the progressive movement and attacked the laissez-faire policies advocated by Herbert Spencer and William Graham Sumner. In The Theory of the Leisure Class (1899), Thorstein Veblen attacked the "conspicuous consumption" of the wealthy. Educator John Dewey emphasized a child-centered philosophy of pedagogy known as progressive education which affected schoolrooms for three generations.

Progressives set up training programs to ensure that welfare and charity work would be undertaken by trained professionals rather than warm-hearted amateurs. Jane Addams of Chicago's Hull House typified the leadership of residential, community centers operated by social workers and volunteers and located in inner city slums. The purpose of the settlement houses was to raise the standard of living of urbanites by providing adult education and cultural enrichment programs.

==== Anti-prostitution ====
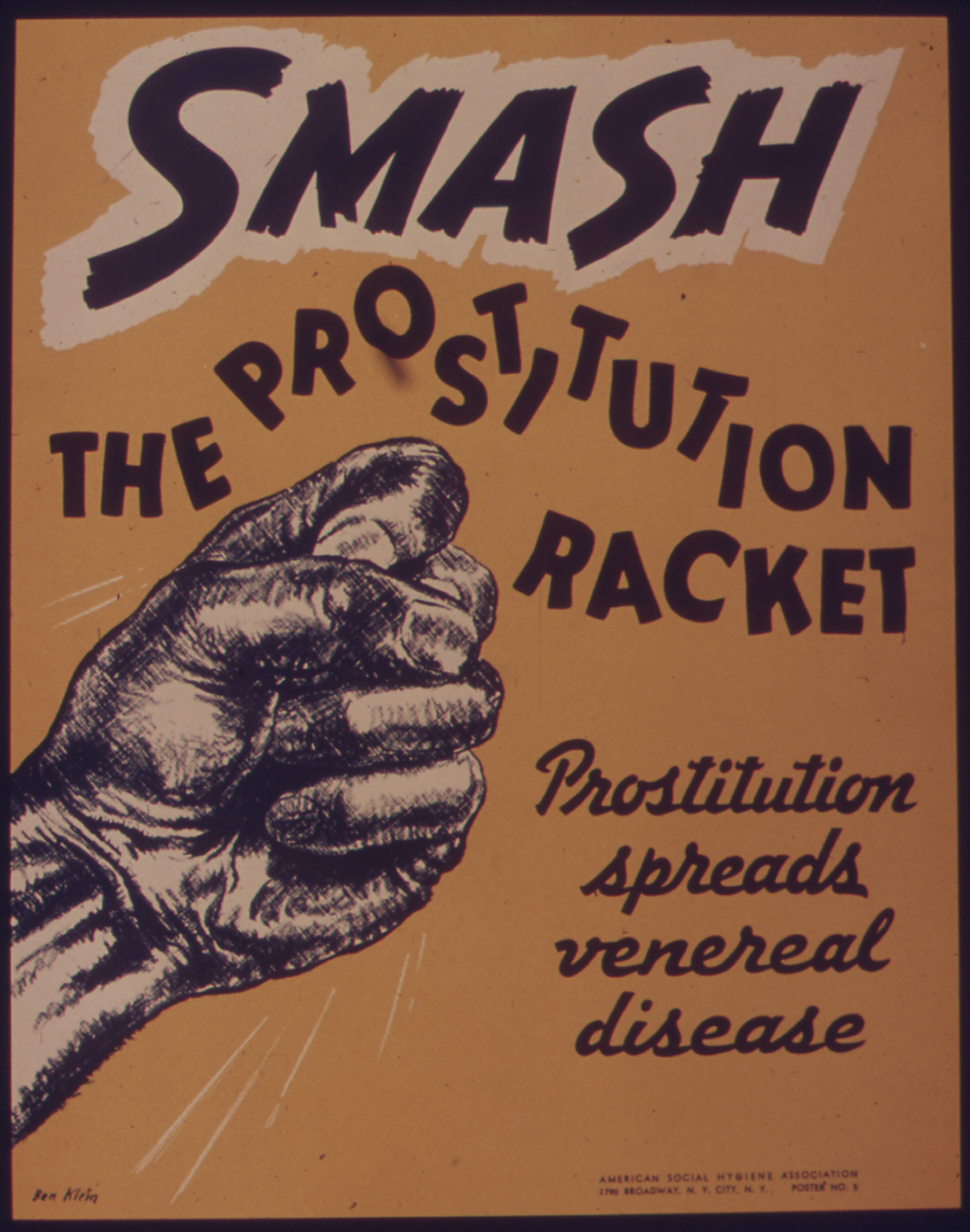
United States federal government World War II era poster against prostitution

During this era of massive reformation among all social aspects, elimination of prostitution was vital for the progressives, especially the women. The anti-prostitution movement involved three main groups: Christians, Progressive Era feminists, and physicians. Many individuals active in the anti-prostitution movement shared some of the same perspectives from each of these groups. Jane Addams, one of the most notable of early American social workers, wrote a book addressing prostitution. According to her argument in A New Conscience and an Ancient Evil, the reason why women resorted to prostitution was due to the inadequate salaries they received. However, she also mentions the absence of family oversight of female modesty, as young women migrated from rural to urban areas. Although most prostitutes were born in America, the public believed that women were being brought into the United States and later sold into prostitution. The opposition against prostitution could have been a reflection of concerns regarding the influx of immigrants, the growth of cities, the development of industries, and the erosion of established moral standards.

==== Enactment of child labor laws ====
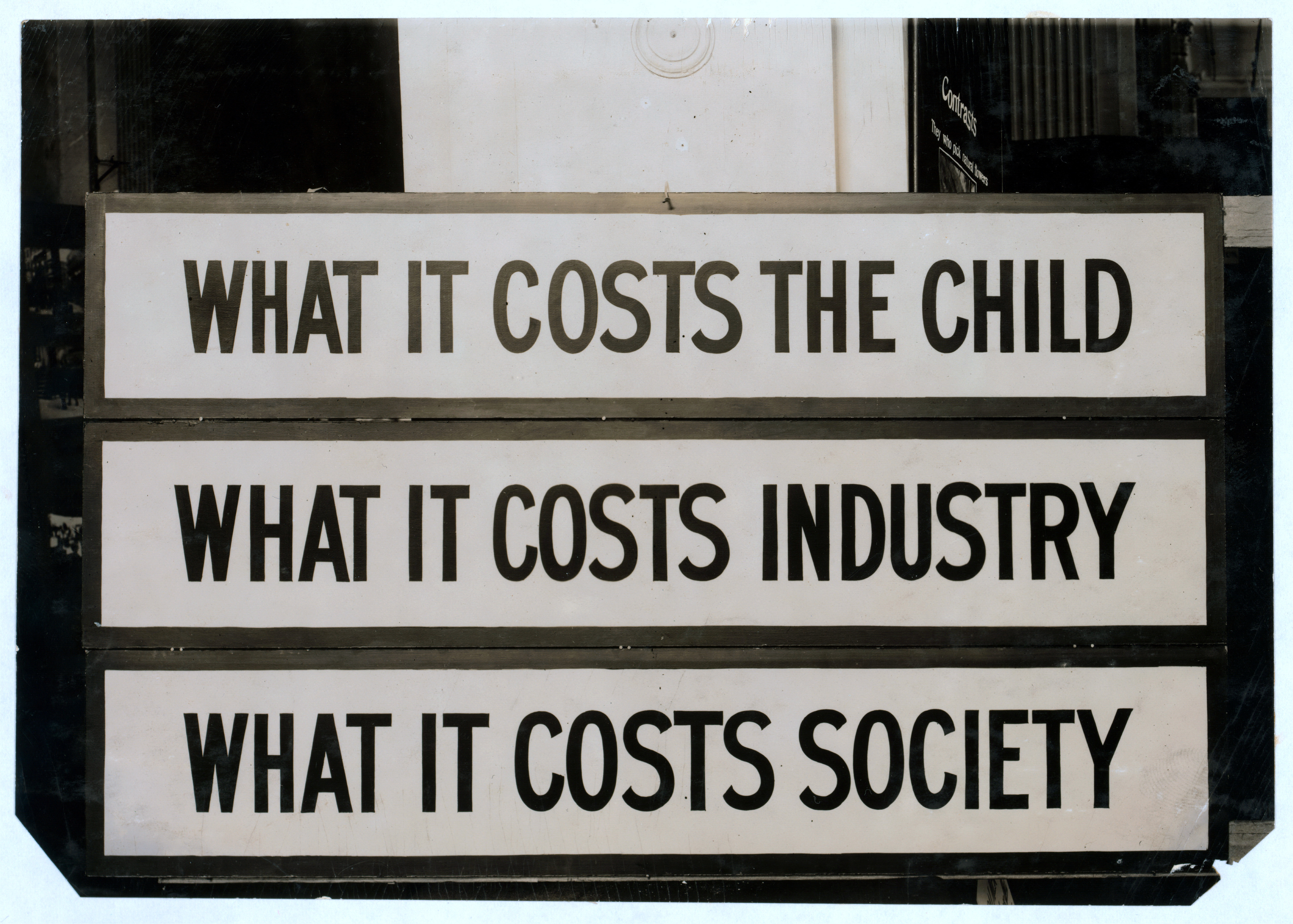
A poster highlighting the situation of child labor in the United States in the early 20th century

Child labor laws were designed to prevent the overuse of children in the newly emerging industries. The goal of these laws was to give working class children the opportunity to go to school and mature more institutionally, thereby liberating the potential of humanity and encouraging the advancement of humanity. Factory owners generally did not want this progression because of lost workers. Parents relied on the income of children to keep the family solvent. Progressives enacted state and federal laws against child labor, but these were overturned by the US Supreme Court. A proposed constitutional amendment was opposed by business and Catholics; it passed Congress but was never ratified by enough states. Child labor was finally outlawed by the New Deal in the 1930s.

==== Prohibition ====
Most progressives, especially in rural areas, adopted the cause of prohibition. They saw the saloon as political corruption incarnate and bewailed the damage done to women and children. They believed the consumption of alcohol limited mankind's potential for advancement. Progressives achieved success first with state laws then with the enactment of the Eighteenth Amendment to the United States Constitution in 1919. The golden day did not dawn as enforcement was lax, especially in the cities where the law had very limited popular support and where notorious criminal gangs such as the Chicago gang of Al Capone made a crime spree based on illegal sales of liquor in speakeasies. The "experiment" (as President Herbert Hoover called it) also cost the federal and local treasuries large sums of taxes. The 18th amendment was repealed by the Twenty-first Amendment to the United States Constitution in 1933.

=== Support for organized labor ===
Labor unions grew steadily until 1916, then expanded fast during the war. In 1919, a wave of major strikes alienated the middle class and the strikes were lost which alienated the workers. In the 1920s, the unions were in the doldrums. In 1924, they supported Robert M. La Follette's Progressive Party, but he only carried his base in Wisconsin. The American Federation of Labor under Samuel Gompers after 1907 began supporting the Democrats, who promised more favorable judges as the Republicans appointed pro-business judges. Theodore Roosevelt and his third party also supported such goals as the eight-hour work day, improved safety and health conditions in factories, workers' compensation laws and minimum wage laws for women. At the same time, the legacy of slavery created deep racial divisions within the American working class, unlike the more unified labor movements in other Western countries. This division led to a two-tiered workforce with differing political priorities, weakening class solidarity. Many white working-class Americans feared that welfare and similar policies would come at their expense, viewing economic redistribution as a zero-sum game, where benefits for Black Americans meant losses for themselves. This fear of losing economic ground pushed many white workers toward conservative, anti-socialist ideologies that promised to protect their interests and social status. As a result, this racial divide contributed to the absence of strong left-wing political movements and parties in the U.S.

=== Eugenics faction ===
Eugenics emerged in the United States as a progressive social movement. With progressives sponsoring eugenics as a solution to excessively large or under-performing families, hoping that birth control would enable parents to focus their resources on fewer, better children while others, like Margaret Sanger advocated it. Progressives also advocated for compulsory sterilization of those deemed "unfit". Progressive leaders such as Herbert Croly and Walter Lippmann indicated their classical liberal concern over the danger posed to the individual by the practice of eugenics. Progressive politician William Jennings Bryan opposed eugenics on the grounds of his anti-evolution activism. In a paper titled "The Progressives: Racism and Public Law", American legal scholar Herbert Hovenkamp (MA, PhD, JD) wrote:

When examining the Progressives on race, it is critical to distinguish the views that they inherited from those that they developed. The rise of Progressivism coincided with the death of scientific racism, which had been taught in American universities since the early nineteenth century and featured prominently in the scientific debate over Darwin’s theory of evolution. Eugenics, which attempted to use genetics and mathematics to validate many racist claims, was its last gasp. The most notable thing about the Progressives is that they were responsible for bringing scientific racism to an end.

=== Electoral changes ===
Progressives repeatedly warned that illegal voting was corrupting the political system. They especially identified big-city bosses, working with saloon keepers and precinct workers, as the culprits who stuffed the ballot boxes. The solution to purifying the vote included prohibition (designed to close down the saloons), voter registration requirements (designed to end multiple voting), and literacy tests (designed to minimize the number of ignorant voters).

All of the Southern states used devices to disenfranchise black voters during the Progressive Era. Typically, the progressive elements in those states pushed for disenfranchisement, often fighting against the conservatism of the Black Belt whites. A major reason given was that whites routinely purchased black votes to control elections, and it was easier to disenfranchise blacks than to go after powerful white men. In the Northern states, progressives such as Robert M. La Follette and William Simon U'Ren argued that the average citizen should have more control over his government. The Oregon System of "Initiative, Referendum, and Recall" was exported to many states, including Idaho, Washington and Wisconsin. Many progressives such as George M. Forbes, president of Rochester's Board of Education, hoped to make government in the United States more responsive to the direct voice of the American people, arguing:

[W]e are now intensely occupied in forging the tools of democracy, the direct primary, the initiative, the referendum, the recall, the short ballot, commission government. But in our enthusiasm we do not seem to be aware that these tools will be worthless unless they are used by those who are aflame with the sense of brotherhood. ... The idea [of the social centers movement is] to establish in each community an institution having a direct and vital relation to the welfare of the neighborhood, ward, or district, and also to the city as a whole.

Philip J. Ethington seconds this high view of direct democracy, saying that "initiatives, referendums, and recalls, along with direct primaries and the direct election of US Senators, were the core achievements of 'direct democracy' by the Progressive generation during the first two decades of the twentieth century".

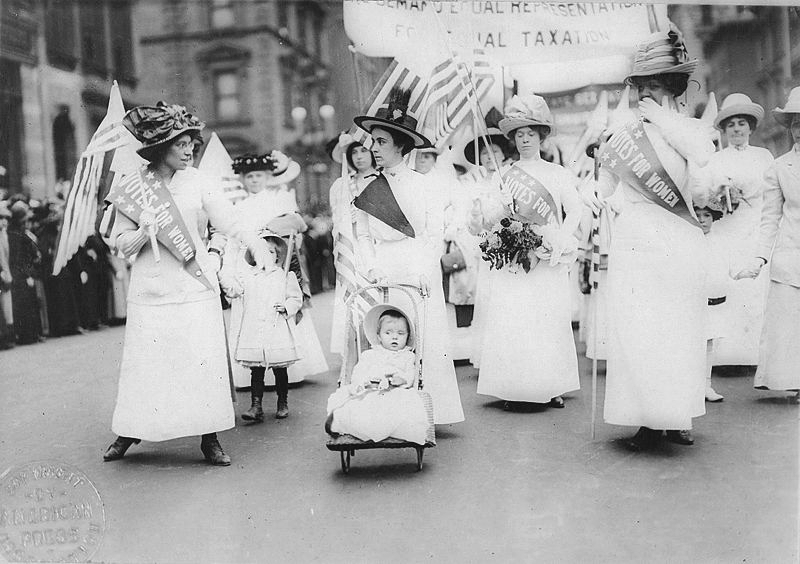
Women marching for the right to vote, 1912

Progressives fought for women's suffrage to purify the elections using supposedly purer female voters. Progressives in the South supported the elimination of supposedly corrupt black voters from the election booth. Historian Michael Perman says that in both Texas and Georgia "disfranchisement was the weapon as well as the rallying cry in the fight for reform". In Virginia, "the drive for disfranchisement had been initiated by men who saw themselves as reformers, even progressives".

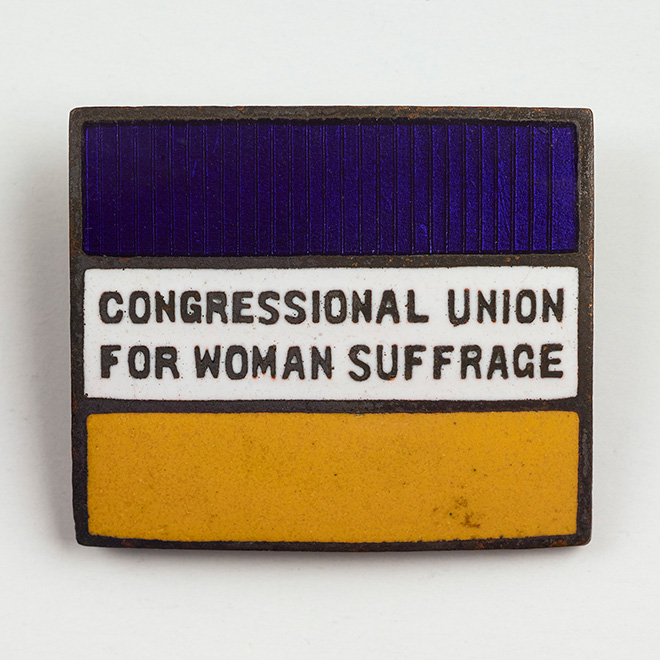
Congressional pin with characteristic purple-and-gold banner of the National American Woman Suffrage Association

While the ultimate significance of the progressive movement on today's politics is still up for debate, Alonzo L. Hamby asks:

What were the central themes that emerged from the cacophony [of progressivism]? Democracy or elitism? Social justice or social control? Small entrepreneurship or concentrated capitalism? And what was the impact of American foreign policy? Were the progressives isolationists or interventionists? Imperialists or advocates of national self-determination? And whatever they were, what was their motivation? Moralistic utopianism? Muddled relativistic pragmatism? Hegemonic capitalism? Not surprisingly many battered scholars began to shout 'no mas!' In 1970, Peter Filene declared that the term 'progressivism' had become meaningless.

=== Municipal administration ===
The progressives typically concentrated on city and state government, looking for waste and better ways to provide services as the cities grew rapidly. These changes led to a more structured system, power that had been centralized within the legislature would now be more locally focused. The changes were made to the system to effectively make legal processes, market transactions, bureaucratic administration and democracy easier to manage, putting them under the classification of "Municipal Administration". There was also a change in authority for this system as it was believed that the authority that was not properly organized had now given authority to professionals, experts and bureaucrats for these services. These changes led to a more solid type of municipal administration compared to the old system that was underdeveloped and poorly constructed.

The progressives mobilized concerned middle class voters as well as newspapers and magazines to identify problems and concentrate reform sentiment on specific problems. Many Protestants focused on the saloon as the power base for corruption as well as violence and family disruption, so they tried to get rid of the entire saloon system through prohibition. Others such as Jane Addams in Chicago promoted settlement houses. Early municipal reformers included Hazen S. Pingree (mayor of Detroit in the 1890s) and Tom L. Johnson in Cleveland, Ohio. In 1901, Johnson won election as mayor of Cleveland on a platform of just taxation, home rule for Ohio cities and a 3-cent streetcar fare. Columbia University President Seth Low was elected mayor of New York City in 1901 on a reform ticket.

=== Conservation ===
During the term of the progressive Republican President Theodore Roosevelt (1901–1909) and influenced by the ideas of philosopher-scientists such as George Perkins Marsh, William John McGee, John Muir, John Wesley Powell and Lester Frank Ward, the largest government-funded conservation-related projects in United States history were undertaken.

On March 14, 1903, President Roosevelt created the first National Bird Preserve, the beginning of the Wildlife Refuge system, on Pelican Island, Florida. In all, by 1909, the Roosevelt administration had created an unprecedented 42 million acres (170,000 km^{2}) of United States National Forests, 53 National Wildlife Refuges and 18 areas of "special interest" such as the Grand Canyon.

==== Reclamation ====
In addition, Roosevelt approved the Newlands Reclamation Act of 1902 which gave subsidies for irrigation in 13 (eventually 20) Western states. Another conservation-oriented bill was the Antiquities Act of 1906 that protected large areas of land by allowing the president to declare areas meriting protection to be national monuments. The Inland Waterways Commission was appointed by Roosevelt on March 14, 1907, to study the river systems of the United States, including the development of water power, flood control and land reclamation.

=== National politics ===
In the early 20th century, politicians of the Democratic and Republican parties, Lincoln–Roosevelt League Republicans (in California) and Theodore Roosevelt's Progressive ("Bull Moose") Party all pursued environmental, political and economic reforms. Chief among these aims was the pursuit of trust busting, the breaking up very large monopolies and support for labor unions, public health programs, decreased corruption in politics and environmental conservation.

The progressive movement enlisted support from both major parties and from minor parties as well. One leader, the Democratic William Jennings Bryan, had won both the Democratic Party and the Populist Party nominations in 1896. At the time, the great majority of other major leaders had been opposed to populism. When Roosevelt left the Republican Party in 1912, he took with him many of the intellectual leaders of progressivism, but very few political leaders. The Republican Party then became notably more committed to business-oriented and efficiency-oriented progressivism, typified by Herbert Hoover and William Howard Taft.

== New Deal consensus and increased influence of social liberalism ==
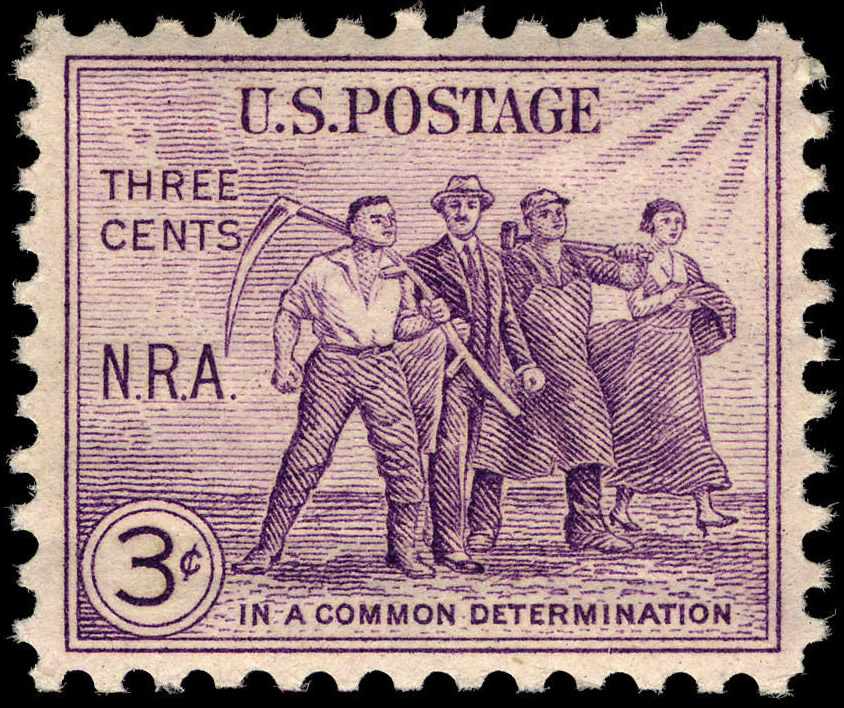
New Deal National Recovery Administration 3-cent 1933 issue U.S. stamp

When Franklin Roosevelt began his run for a second gubernatorial term in May 1930, he reiterated his doctrine from the campaign two years before: "that progressive government by its very terms must be a living and growing thing, that the battle for it is never-ending and that if we let up for one single moment or one single year, not merely do we stand still but we fall back in the march of civilization." He was re-elected to a second term 56% to 33%. Roosevelt proposed economic relief and the creation of the Temporary Emergency Relief Administration for fund distribution. In 1930, Roosevelt passed through the legislature a bill creating old-age insurance for New Yorkers over the age of 70. Roosevelt supported reforestation with the Hewitt Amendment in 1931, which gave birth to New York's State Forest system. Roosevelt also began an investigation into corruption in New York City among the judiciary, the police force, and organized crime, prompting the creation of the Seabury Commission. The Seabury investigations exposed an extortion ring, led many public officials to be removed from office, and made the decline of Tammany Hall inevitable.

Being a progressive governor with popular support and with there being an increasingly unpopular president in Herbert Hoover, Roosevelt saw an opening toward a potentially successful bid for president as the Democratic nominee. Facing the Great Depression, Roosevelt the nominee called for securities regulation, tariff reduction, farm relief, government-funded public works, and other government actions to address the economic hardship. The 1932 Democratic platform included a call for the repeal of Prohibition (a change from earlier progressive viewpoint Following the convention, Roosevelt won endorsements from several progressive Republicans, including George W. Norris, Hiram Johnson, and Robert La Follette Jr. Roosevelt ultimately won the election with 57% of the popular vote and carried all but six states. Historians and political scientists consider the 1932–36 elections to be a political realignment. Roosevelt's victory was enabled by the creation of the New Deal coalition, small farmers, the Southern whites, Catholics, big-city political machines, labor unions, northern black Americans (southern ones were still disfranchised), Jews, intellectuals, and political liberals. The creation of the New Deal coalition transformed American politics and started what political scientists call the "New Deal Party System" or the Fifth Party System with the backing of a diverse voting coalition in support of progressive policies and economically populist themes.

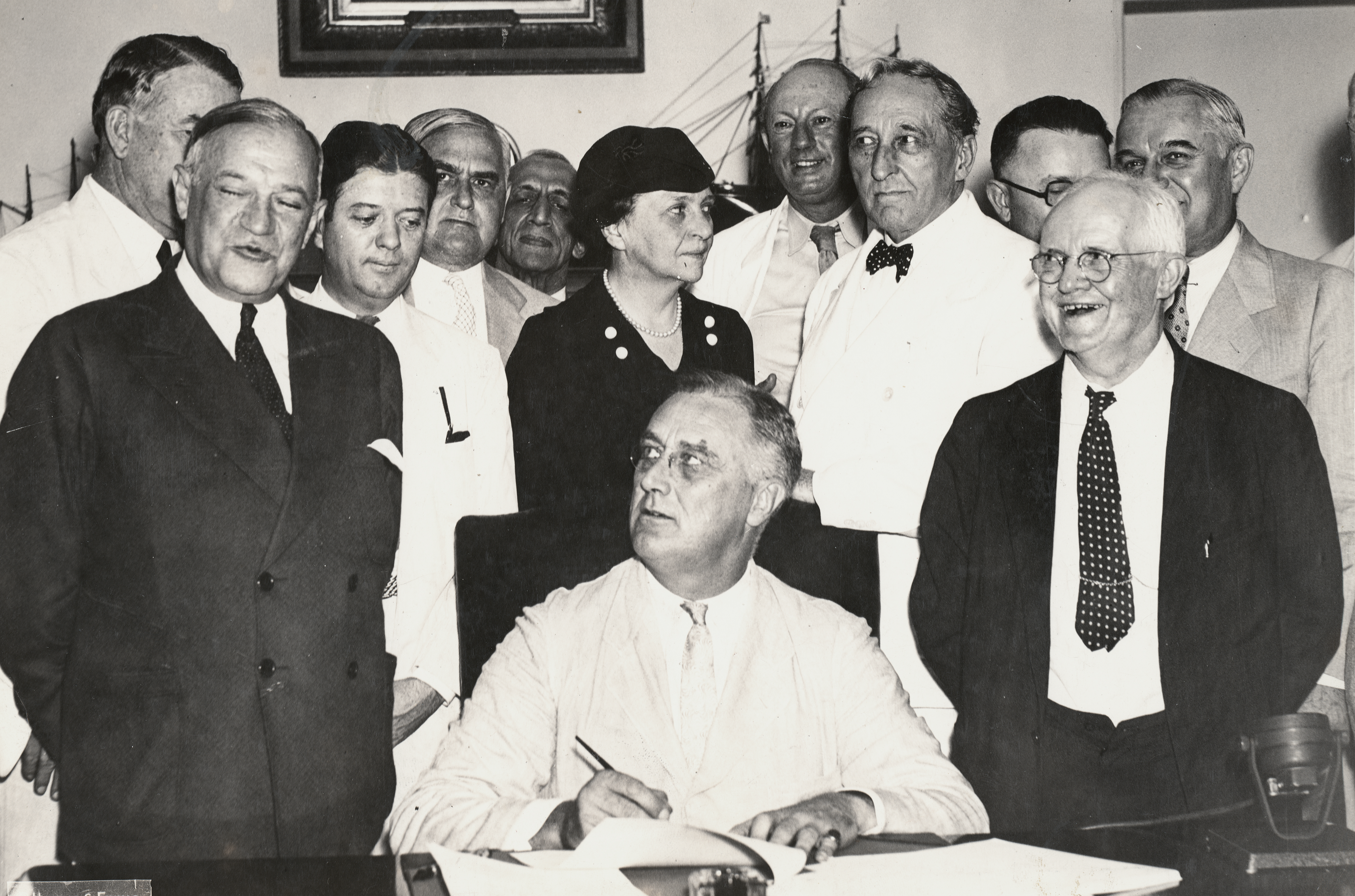
President Roosevelt signing the Social Security Act. Among those in attendance were Senator Alben Barkley, Senator Robert F. Wagner, and Senator Robert LaFollette Jr.. August 14, 1935

The New Deal under the F.D.R. administration brought new influence onto progressive thought with social liberalism and Keynesian economics. By 1936, the label of "progressive" became nearly synonymous with supporters of the New Deal. From 1934 to 1938, there existed a "pro-spender" majority in Congress (drawn from two-party, competitive, non-machine, progressive and left party districts). In the 1938 midterm election, Roosevelt and his progressive supporters lost control of Congress to the bipartisan conservative coalition. Despite additional pushback on Roosevelt's more progressive Second New Deal of 1935–1936, the progressive legacy of the New Deal and its impact on the American psyche remained strong. Republican President Dwight D. Eisenhower, in accepting a degree of government intervention in the economy to correct market failures, and despite his suspicion that these programs would eventually lead to rampant statism and socialism, attempted to contain, rather than repeal, New Deal laws as many conservative Republicans wished to do. Eisenhower understood the popularity of F.D.R.'s progressive economic reforms and recognized the political impossibility of undermining them, critiquing right-wing conservatives and saying in a letter to his brother Edgar: "Should any political party attempt to abolish social security, unemployment insurance, and eliminate labor laws and farm programs, you would not hear of that party again in our political history. There is a tiny splinter group, of course, that believes you can do these things...[But] their number is negligible and they are stupid." The New Deal provided a backdrop for the future expansive liberal programs proposed and, to varying degrees of success, enacted in John F. Kennedy's New Frontier or Lyndon B. Johnson's Great Society. From 1969 and onwards, and especially into the 1980s of the Reagan Revolution, deregulation of the economy gained bipartisan support, and progressive inclination waned.

== Contemporary progressivism in the 21st century ==
Contemporary progressivism can be seen as encompassing many notable differences from the historical progressivism of the 19th–20th centuries. Some viewpoints of contemporary progressivism highlight these perceived differences like those of Princeton economics professor Thomas C. Leonard who viewed historical progressivism in The American Conservative as being "[a]t a glance, ... not much here for 21st-century progressives to claim kinship with. Today's progressives emphasize racial equality and minority rights, decry U.S. imperialism, shun biological ideas in social science, and have little use for piety or proselytizing." The scholar Gideon Rose sees the difference as being explained in two lessons: "One lesson the case teaches, therefore, is that certain kinds of reforms can make life better...A second lesson, however, is that other kinds of reforms can make life worse." Rose pointed out how both the old progressivism of the Progressive Era and the contemporary movement share the notions that completely free markets and industrialization lead to economic inequalities needing amelioration in order to protect the American working class, and that this can be accomplished by a continuing turn toward essentially social democratic policies.

=== Mitigating income inequality ===
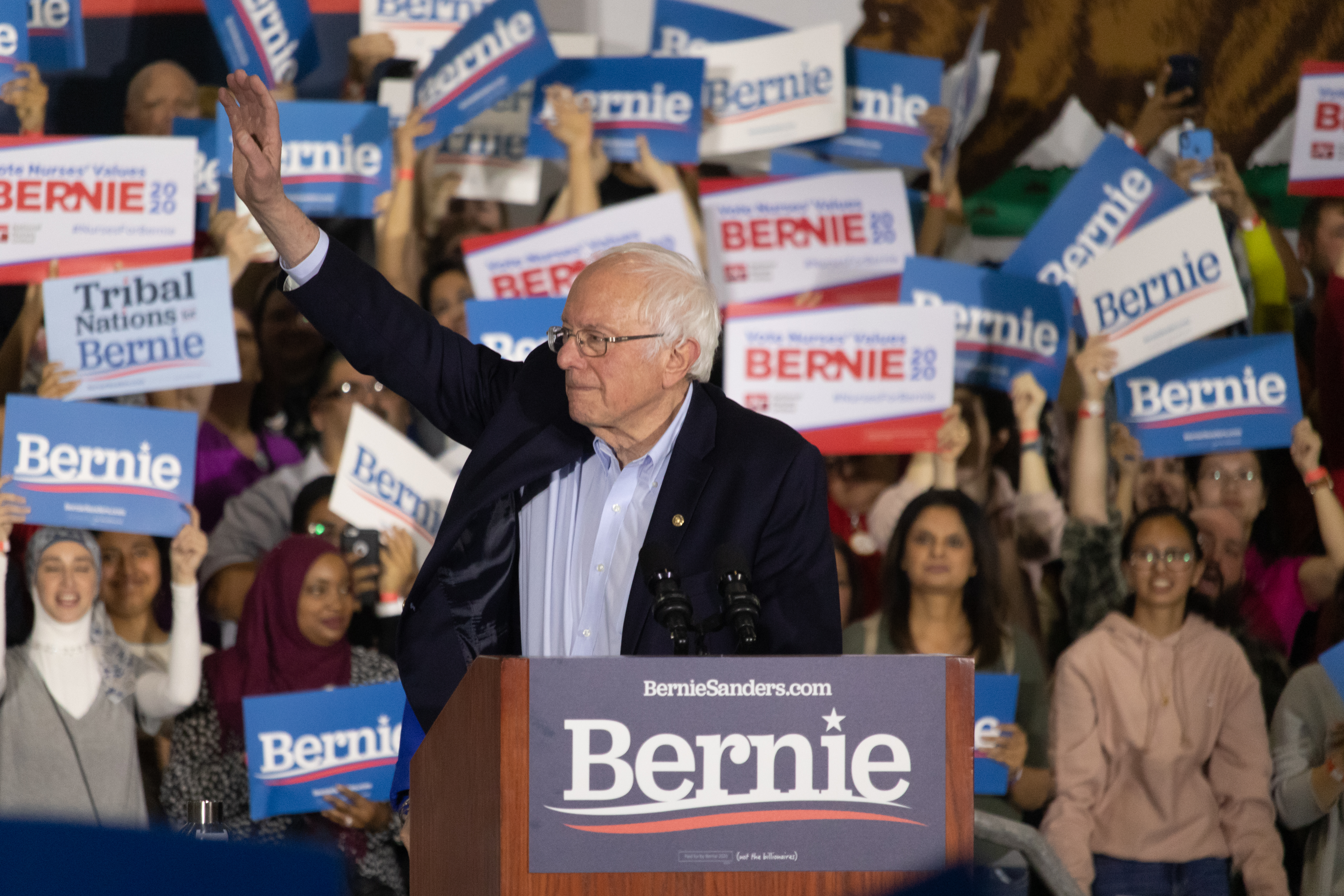
Politician Bernie Sanders (pictured at podium) is widely recognized for contributing to a progressive shift within the Democratic Party since the 2010s.

Income inequality in the United States has been on the rise since 1970. Progressives argue that lower union rates, weak policy, globalization and other drivers have caused the gap in income. The rise of income inequality has led progressives to draft legislation including, but not limited to, reforming Wall Street, reforming the tax code, reforming campaign finance, closing loopholes and keeping domestic work.

==== Wall Street reform ====
Progressives began to demand stronger Wall Street regulation after they perceived deregulation and relaxed enforcement as leading to the 2008 financial crisis. The Occupy Wall Street movement, launched in downtown Manhattan, was one high-profile reaction to the financial shenanigans. Passing the Dodd-Frank financial regulatory act in 2010 provided increased oversight on financial institutions and the creation of new regulatory agencies, but many progressives argue its broad framework allows for financial institutions to continue to take advantage of consumers and the government. Among others, Bernie Sanders has argued for reimplementing Glass-Steagall, which regulated banking more strictly, and for breaking up financial institutions where market-share is concentrated in a select few 'too big to fail' corporations.

==== Minimum wage ====
Adjusted for inflation, the minimum wage peaked in 1968 at around $9.90 an hour in 2020 dollars. Progressives believe that stagnating wages perpetuate income inequality and that raising the minimum wage is a necessary step to combat inequality. If the minimum wage grew at the rate of productivity growth in the United States, it would have reached $21.72 an hour in 2012, nearly three times as much as the current $7.25 an hour. Popular progressives such as Senator Bernie Sanders and Representative Alexandria Ocasio-Cortez have endorsed a federally mandated wage increase to $15 an hour. The movement has already seen success with its implementation in California with the passing of a bill to raise the minimum wage $1 every year until reaching $15 an hour in 2021. New York workers are lobbying for similar legislation as many continue to rally for a minimum wage increase as part of the Fight for $15 movement.

=== Health care reform ===
In 2009, the Congressional Progressive Caucus (CPC) outlined five key healthcare principles they intended to pass into law. The CPC mandated a nationwide public option, affordable health insurance, insurance market regulations, an employer insurance provision mandate and comprehensive services for children. In March 2010, Congress passed the Affordable Care Act, generally referred to as Obamacare, which was intended to increase the affordability and efficiency of the United States healthcare system. Although considered a partial success by some progressives, many argued that it did not go far enough in achieving healthcare reform as exemplified with the Democrats' failure in achieving a national public option. In recent decades, single-payer healthcare has become an important goal in healthcare reform for progressives. In the 2016 Democratic Party primaries, progressive presidential candidate Bernie Sanders raised the issue of a single-payer healthcare system, citing his belief that millions of Americans are still paying too much for health insurance and arguing that millions more do not receive the care they need. In November 2016, an effort was made to implement a single-payer healthcare system in the state of Colorado, known as ColoradoCare (Amendment 69). Senator Sanders held rallies in Colorado in support of Amendment 69 leading up to the vote. Despite high-profile support, Amendment 69 failed to pass, with just 21.23% of voting Colorado residents voting in favor and 78.77% against.

=== Environmental justice ===
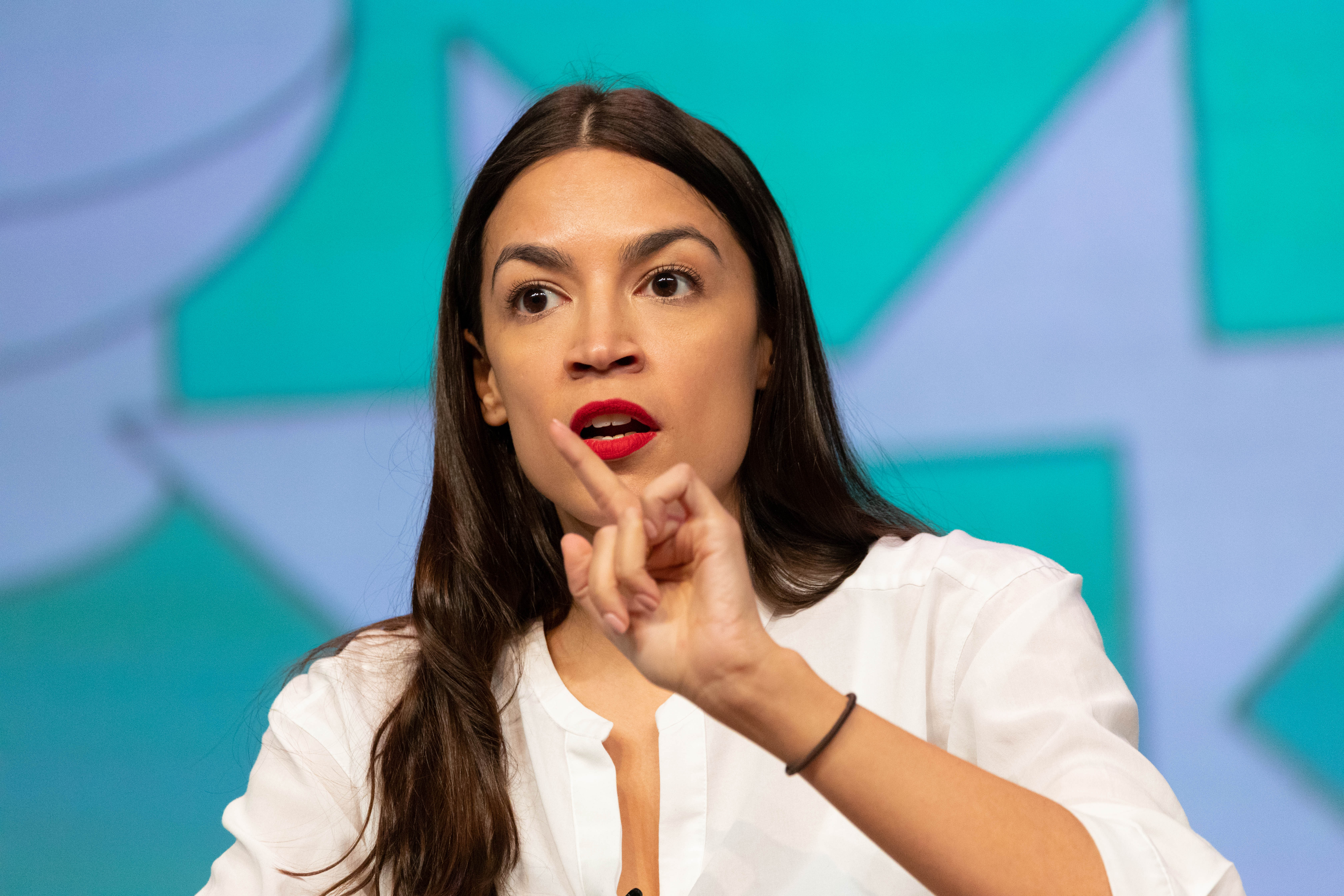
U.S. representative Alexandria Ocasio-Cortez from New York, an advocate of action on climate change and author of the Green New Deal

Contemporary progressives advocate strong environmental protections and measures to reduce or eliminate pollution. One reason for this is the strong link between economic injustice and adverse environmental conditions as groups that are economically marginalized tend to be disproportionately affected by the harms of pollution and environmental degradation.

=== Social justice ===
In the 21st century progressives in the United States are advocating for the implementation of legislation that will promote a more equal society and help reduce the gaps between diverse populations in the American society, including the gaps between populations of different races, gender gaps and socio-economic gaps. Progressives support the promotion of criminal justice reform to rectify systemic injustices, and the eradication of discriminatory practices in areas such as employment and housing.

=== Definition debate within the Democratic Party ===
With the rise in popularity of progressives such as Alexandria Ocasio-Cortez, Bernie Sanders, and Elizabeth Warren, the term progressive began to carry greater cultural currency, particularly in the 2016 Democratic primaries. While answering a question from CNN moderator Anderson Cooper regarding her willingness to shift positions during an October 2015 debate, Hillary Clinton referred to herself as a "progressive who likes to get things done", drawing the ire of a number of Sanders supporters and other critics from her left. Senator John Fetterman, who was elected on a progressive platform, later shifted to the right on foreign policy and domestic positions on issues such as the war in Gaza and the increased illegal immigration on the southern border, later stating that he no longer considered himself a progressive. While debate about the ideological scope of the term has persisted within the Democratic Party and without since the election of Donald Trump in the 2016 United States presidential election, the label in a partisan context generally indicates some affiliation with the more left flank of the Democratic Party.

=== Democratic socialism ===
Some progressives within the Democratic Party have self-identified as democratic socialists, with Senator Bernie Sanders described by USA Today as "the godfather of modern American democratic socialism". Rather than a fully defined political ideology, democratic socialism in the United States is defined by academic experts and existing members as "a belief that the economy should be run for the public's benefit through democratic decision-making", often through expanding public services in areas such as housing or healthcare, which has overlap with common progressive views. The New York Times describes it as the most far-left aspect of the "progressive coalition", but that it "support[s] working within the capitalist system rather than abolishing it outright", such as through raising the minimum wage. It wrote that the ideology has "no standard definition" and that many of its ideas had more in common with social democracy rather than actual socialism. As a result, democratic socialism in the American context has been described as being used as a synonym for social democracy itself. Academics have rejected similarities to communism, while noting extensive conservative red-baiting.

The Democratic Socialists of America is an external group seeking to shift the Democratic Party to the left, often by working with, endorsing, or opposing progressive Democrats. In turn, some progressive Democrats have sought to court or distance themselves from the organization.

== Progressive parties ==
Following the first progressive movement of the early 20th century, three later short-lived parties have also identified as progressive, as well as one contemporary minor third party.

=== Progressive Party, 1912 ===
The first political party named the Progressive Party was formed for the 1912 presidential election to elect Theodore Roosevelt. It was formed after Roosevelt lost his bid to become the Republican candidate to William Howard Taft, and became defunct by 1920.

=== Progressive Party, 1924 ===
In 1924, Wisconsin Senator Robert M. La Follette ran for president on the Progressive Party ticket. La Follette won the support of labor unions, German Americans, and socialists by his crusade. He carried only Wisconsin, and the party vanished elsewhere. In Wisconsin, it remained a force until the 1940s.

=== National Progressives, 1938 ===
Governor Phil La Follette announces formation of the National Progressives of America, April 28, 1938.

=== Progressive Party, 1948 ===
A third party was initiated in 1948 by former Vice President Henry A. Wallace as a vehicle for his campaign for president of the United States. He saw the two parties as reactionary and war-mongering, and attracted support from left-wing voters who opposed the Cold War policies that had become a national consensus. Most liberals, New Dealers, and especially the Congress of Industrial Organizations, denounced the party because in their view it was increasingly controlled by Communists. It faded away after winning 2% of the vote in 1948.

=== Working Families Party, 1998 ===
WFP logo in 2020

The Working Families Party is a progressive minor political party in the United States. Founded in New York in 1998, it has active chapters in nearly two dozen states.

The Working Families Party was first organized in 1998 by a coalition of labor unions, community organizations, members of the now-inactive national New Party, and a variety of advocacy groups such as Citizen Action of New York and ACORN: the Association of Community Organizations for Reform Now. The party takes advantage of electoral fusion laws in certain states to prop-up progressive candidates via endorsement within the current two-party system.

== See also ==
- Democratic socialism
- Left-wing populism
- Lincoln–Roosevelt League
- Oregon Progressive Party
- Progressive Citizens of America
- Vermont Progressive Party
- Washington Progressive Party
