= Lowell Public Schools =

School district in Massachusetts, United States

Location
- 155 Merrimack Street, Lowell, MA 01852 United States

District information
- Type: Public; Open enrollment
- Grades: K-12
- Superintendent: Liam Skinner (2023–Present)
- Schools: 24
- Budget: $257,347,416 total $12,864 per pupil (2025)

Students and staff
- Students: 16,504
- Teachers: 1,154
- Student–teacher ratio: 14 to 1

Other information
- Website: www.lowell.k12.ma.us

Lowell Public Schools is a school district headquartered in the Bon Marche building at 155 Merrimack Street in downtown Lowell, Massachusetts.

The Lowell Public Schools (LPS) is one of the largest districts in Massachusetts, currently enrolling more than 14,150 students in grades PreK-12. In 1987 Mary Jane Mullen, a guidance counselor at the school district, stated on WGBH-TV that around 1977 there were significant numbers of Latinos and Greek speaking people, and that by 1987 there were still significant numbers of Latinos but that there were no longer significant numbers of Greek-speaking students. By 1987 the district received an influx of Cambodian students.

== Previous Superintendents ==
- George H. Conley (1884–1886)
- George F. Lawton (1886–1891)
- Vincent McCartin (1933–1969)
- Wayne Peters (1969–1972)
- Hugh McDougall (1972–1973)
- Earl Sharfman (1973–1977)
- Patrick Morgan (1977–1982)
- Henry Mroz (1982–1990)
- George Tsapatsaris (1991–2000)
- Karla Brooks Baehr (2000–2008)
- Chris Scott (2008–2011)
- Jean Franco (2011–2015)
- Salah Khelfaoui (2015–2018)
- Jeannie Durkin (2018–2019, acting)
- Dr. Joel Boyd (2019–2023)
- Liam Skinner (June 2023–present, interim tag removed on Jan 18, 2024)

== Schools ==
Schools include:

High school

- Lowell High School (9–12)

K-8 schools

- Joseph G. Pyne Arts Magnet School
- Bartlett Community Partnership School
- Edith Nourse Rogers Stem Academy

Middle schools

(5–8)

- Benjamin F. Butler Middle School
- Dr. An Wang Middle School - named for An Wang co-founder of Wang Laboratories.
- H.J. Robinson Middle School
- James S. Daley Middle School
- Kathryn P. Stoklosa Middle School
- James F. Sullivan Middle School of Communications

Elementary schools

PreK-4 schools

- Abraham Lincoln Elementary School
- Charlotte M. Murkland Elementary School
- Greenhalge Elementary School
- Pawtucketville Memorial Elementary School
- S. Christa McAuliffe Elementary School
- John J. Shaughnessy Elementary School
- Washington Elementary School
- C.W. Morey Elementary School
- Dr. Gertrude M. Bailey Elementary School
- Joseph A. McAvinnue Elementary School

K-4 schools

- Moody Elementary School
- Peter W. Reilly Elementary School
