= Russell will case =

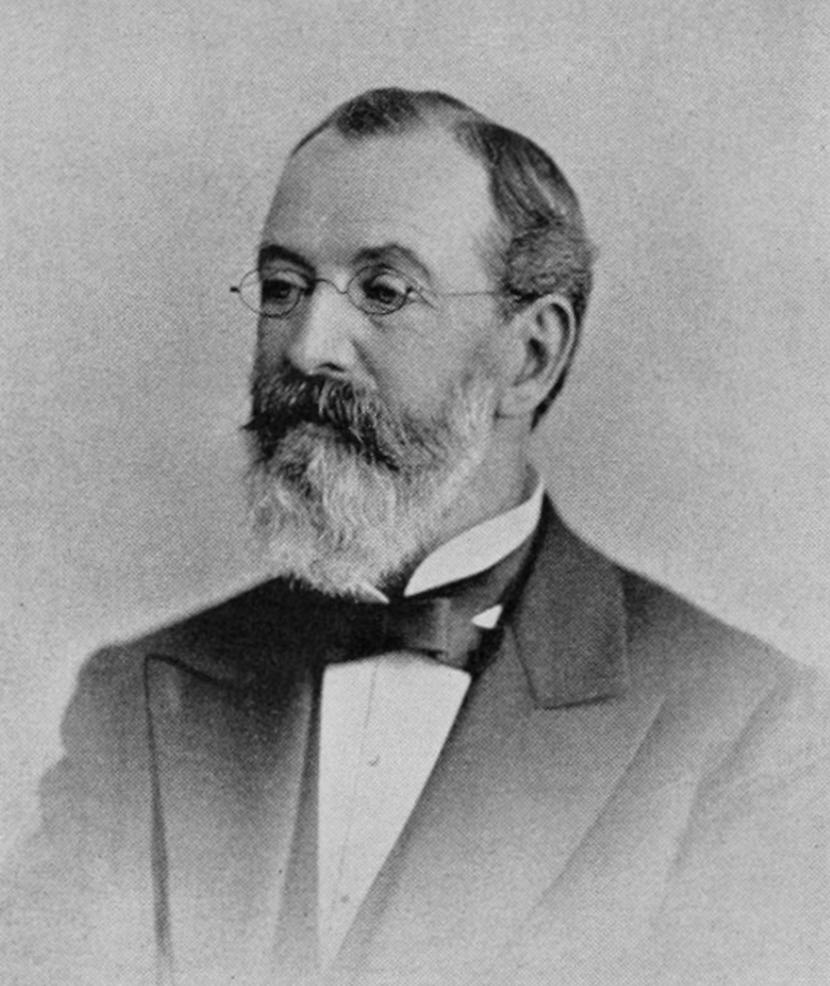
Daniel Russell

The Russell will case was a four-year dispute over the estate of Daniel Russell, an American businessman and politician from Melrose, Massachusetts. Russell died in 1907 and left his estate to his two sons – William C. Russell and Daniel Blake Russell. Daniel Blake Russell had not been seen since 1895 and two years after Daniel Russell's death, a man from North Dakota claiming to be Daniel Blake Russell sought half of the estate. William C. Russell did not believe this man was his brother, leading to a court battle, during which time a second claimant, this one from Fresno, California, appeared. This claimant was recognized by William Russell and the case was resolved in 1913 in favor of "Fresno Dan".

== Background ==
Daniel Russell was a partner of Isaac Fenno & Co. (a Boston clothing company), president of the Melrose Savings Bank, and a member of the Massachusetts Senate. He and his wife, Mary Lynde, had two sons, William C. Russell and Daniel Blake Russell. Daniel left home in 1885, and his parents never heard from him again. Mary Lynde Russell died in 1899.

Daniel Russell died on January 23, 1907, after a brief illness. He left his $500,000 estate to William, with the request that if Daniel ever returned home, he would be given his share of the estate. His brother-in-law, Ferdinand Almy, and William C. Russell were appointed co-executors and a receiver was appointed to hold Daniel Blake Russell’s portion of the estate.

== Arrival of “Dakota Dan” ==
In 1909, Minneapolis businessman Horace G. Whitmore met a cattle rancher in Dickinson, North Dakota who claimed to be Daniel Blake Russell. Whitmore agreed to finance his attempt to establish his identity and in exchange, the man would invest in one of Whitmore’s enterprises once he received his inheritance. Whitmore reached out to an acquaintance in Boston and learned that the executors of the Russell estate had been advised by their attorneys that if Daniel Blake Russell were alive, he had no legal interest in the will. That April, the rancher, accompanied by Minneapolis attorney Charles J. Traxler, appeared in Melrose claiming to be Daniel Blake Russell. According to the rancher, he had left home due to an argument with his father and did not know of his father’s death until a year after it happened.

William C. Russell did not recognize this man as his brother, but a number of people who knew Daniel Blake Russell as a child met with the rancher and stated that he was able to recall incidents that only the real Daniel Blake Russell would remember. On April 30, 1909, the man claiming to be Daniel Blake Russell appeared in the law office of Berry & Upton in Boston and successfully picked William C. Russell out of a lineup of five men. He also provided the names of three people his father had employed about 25 years prior. On May 1, he returned to the Russell homestead and pointed out all of the changes that had taken place in the past quarter century.

On May 4, 1909, the man claiming to be Daniel Blake Russell left for North Dakota to tend to his business and because Boston’s climate had a negative impact on his health. Before leaving, Traxler stated that his client would return and, if necessary, go to court to receive his share of the estate. In July 1909, the man claiming to be Daniel Blake Russell, now represented by Nelson Sheldon of Boston and Leslie A. Simpson of North Dakota, filed petitions with the Middlesex Probate Court requesting the estate of Daniel Russell be divided according to his will, that the receiver be appointed to hold Daniel Blake Russell’s part of the estate be discharged, and that the executor bonds be increased. William C. Russell refused to recognize the man as his brother and contested his claim to the estate. Judge George F. Lawton scheduled a hearing for September 20, 1909.

== First hearing ==
The hearing began on September 20, 1909. William C. Russell did not appear in court and Nelson Sheldon alleged that he had avoided service. The petitioner attended the first seven days of the hearings, but did not appear afterwards. His attorneys refused to have him return to the courtroom until William C. Russell appeared, as they wanted the court to compare the two men.

Multiple former classmates of Russell identified the North Dakota man as Daniel Blake Russell, including one who testified that he had the man claiming to be Russell write some letters in a cipher Melrose schoolboys had used during his youth to prove his identity. Also testifying were a former tramp (Bob Twist) and constable from the North Country of New York, who knew the petitioner as Dan Blake in the 1880s. On September 29, a first cousin of Daniel Blake Russell, Frank G. Lynde testified that he believed the petitioner was Russell. Simpson rested his case after presenting 36 witnesses who identified the petitioner as Daniel Blake Russell.

The respondents’ attorneys began their case on October 1, 1909. Counsel John K. Berry declared that they would prove the petitioner was not Daniel Blake Russell, but instead James Delbert Ruseau (sometimes spelled Rousseau). William Ruseau and Mary (Ruseau) Arno identified the petitioner through multiple photographs as their brother, James. Admitted into evidence were six letters Ruseau’s parents received from James, who was using the name J. D. Russell, sent from the Dickinson area. Theodore H. Hayes, a ranch owner from Midway, North Dakota testified that he knew the petitioner as J. D. Russell and the two had been business partners in North Dakota. Russell had told him he had been born in northern New York and during a serious illness asked to be sent back there to be buried in a Catholic cemetery.

Handwriting experts Charles French and Dr. Bennett F. Davenport testified letters penned by the petitioner and James Delbert Ruseau were written by the same person. Simpson, however, disputed the authenticity of the letters alleged to have been written by the petitioner, calling them “an absolute forgery”. He presented his own expert, William E. Hingston, who testified that the letters were written by two different people and stated that one of the letters allegedly sent by J. D. Russell to the Ruseaus was a forgery because some of the ink had not yet oxidized, which indicated that it had been written recently. Another expert witness for the petitioner, Albert H. Hamilton, testified that he believed the letters entered into evidence by the respondents "were written with an attempt to simulate" and "artificially created to defraud".

Levi S. Gould and Sidney H. Buttrick, both former mayors of Melrose and close friends of Daniel Russell, testified that the claimant was an imposter. Buttrick, who was also Daniel Blake Russell’s Sunday school teacher, stated that the claimant did not recognize him when the two met. Buttrick had some difficulty with the photo identification process and when Judge Lawton suggested it would be easier to make an identification with the petitioner in court, Simpson stated his client would appear before Buttrick or Gould, but not members of the Ruseau family. When Simpson attempted to bring in more witnesses to identify the petitioner as Daniel Blake Russell during rebuttal, Judge Lawton refused to permit their testimony unless they could rebut the respondents' counsel’s claim that the petitioner was James Delbert Ruseau. He then presented one of Ruseau’s former friends and a physician who treated Ruseau, who both testified that Ruseau had suffered a deep knife wound that would have left a permanent scar.

The claimant took the witness stand on December 17, 1909. According to the claimant, on June 3, 1885, he had an argument with his father that ended with an ultimatum to his father to either fire their maid, Kate Mulock, or he would leave home. He left on the night of June 5 and three days later met Bob Twist and began traveling with him. The claimant eventually arrived in Tracy, Minnesota, where he worked as a farrier's helper. In 1887, he became a blacksmith for the Cedar River Company. He rafted logs on the Mississippi River in the spring of 1888 then traveled to New York state. While in Syracuse, New York he saw a notice his father had placed in a newspaper asking for his whereabouts, but he did not return to Melrose because he felt he did not have enough money. In Malone, New York, he saw the name of a Boston man in a hotel ledger and fearing the man had been sent by his father to bring him back home, he fled. While working at a camp in St. Regis Falls, New York, he wrote two letters to his uncle, Tom Lynde, asking him to tell his mother he was okay and not to tell his father where he was. At some point, he received a lock of his mother’s hair, but he could not remember when and did not have it with him during the trial. While in New York, he had two daughters, Eliza and Marion with his first wife, Jennie Carpenter. The claimant was unsure if he was the father of either girl and left Carpenter shortly after Marion was born. That spring, he traveled west, working at a blacksmith shop in Cincinnati. He then worked for the John Robinson Circus in Omaha and Minneapolis. When the circus disbanded in October 1889, he worked for the St. Croix Lumber Company in Stillwater, Minnesota. He left Stillwater in the spring of 1891 and traveled to Chicago, Malone, Montreal, and Liverpool. He returned to Stillwater that fall to work on a steamboat. In 1893, he worked for the Ringling Brothers Circus. When the circus traveled to Boston, he hid to avoid being found by his father. In 1900, he began herding cattle in North Dakota. He remained on the stand until he was released from cross-examination on January 4, 1910.

On Christmas Day, the claimant had dinner with ten of Russell's boyhood friends at the Parker House. He was arrested later that day for public drunkenness.

The petitioners ended their rebuttal on January 6, 1910, 109 days after the hearing began, and the respondents’ attorneys began their surrebuttal the following day. On January 10, Sarah Ruseau identified the Russell claimant as her son, Jim. The following day, three of her children identified the claimant as their brother. The attorneys then presented a number of new witnesses who testified that they knew the claimant as James Ruseau. One of their witnesses, Mary Cook, did not identify the claimant as Ruseau, instead pointing out a court spectator when asked if she saw Ruseau in the courtroom. Sarah Almy, sister of respondent Ferdinand Almy and a housekeeper and cousin of William C. Russell, former housekeeper Kate Mulock, and other Russell household employees, contradicted claims made by the petitioner. William Bloomer, a farmer from Malone, New York, testified that the claimant had resided with him under the name James Rusaw and presented a few lines of poetry the man had written in an album for his daughter.

On February 28, 1910, William C. Russell took the stand. He contradicted a number of the claimants' stories regarding his home life and stated the man’s feet and hand size, eye and hair color, and face and head shape were different from his brother’s. On March 7, 1910, the 102nd day of the contest, Judge Lawton was able to examine the two men side-by-side.

The evidence portion of the contest concluded on March 24, 1910, the 116th day of the trial. During the trial, 205 witnesses were called, 346 exhibits were presented, and a stenographic record of 11,400 pages was produced. The New York Times called it "the most dramatic will case in Boston's history" and that the "famous Tichborne case pales before it in dramatic interest."

== Arrival of “Fresno Dan” ==
In March of 1910, a homeless man from Fresno signed an affidavit claiming to be Daniel Blake Russell. On March 21, 1910, the court recognized William Odlin as the attorney for "Fresno Dan", who left for Boston on three days with counsel George W. Cartwright. According to "Fresno Dan", he left home on June 10, 1885 and both of his parents were aware of his departure beforehand. He had been a wandering laborer, primarily working as a fruit picker and vineyard hand in the San Joaquin Valley, ever since leaving and used the alias Henry Johnson for the past 15 years. He chose not to return home and had not communicated with his parents or brother because he felt he had disgraced the family name and would not be welcome back. He did not know about his father’s death or the dispute over the will until he read a story in the Fresno Herald on February 21, 1910. According to him, he did not want any of his family’s money, but chose to come forward to protect his brother and the estate. "Fresno Dan" and Cartwright arrived in Boston on March 30, 1910 and immediately met with newspaper reporters, as Cartwright wanted his client to "be drained of every bit of information he has about Melrose, the Russell family and their relations" before he met “with anyone who could tell him about Melrose or about the testimony". Reporters questioned the claimant for five consecutive hours.

Simpson and Sheldon produced three men who swore that Fresno Dan was in fact William Cole of Dover, New Hampshire. One of Cole’s sisters was shown a picture of Fresno Dan and denied that the man was her brother. According to her, William Cole was residing in Denver and she had received a Christmas card from him the previous year.

On April 2, 1910, Fresno Dan was examined by William C. Russell in the office of his attorneys. He examined scars on the claimant’s right leg and foot and asked him questions regarding them. According to the claimant, he had accidentally cut his leg with a box cutter while working at a tea store and injured his toe with a hatchet at the Russell home. These answers, according to William, were correct.

== Lawton’s ruling ==
On April 12, 1910, Lawton ruled that "Dakota Dan" was an impostor and dismissed his three petitions. Lawton cited the 48 witnesses who identified the man as James D. Ruseau, letters to members of the Ruseau family sent from places where the claimant lived, statements on the petitioner’s application to the Woodmen of the World regarding his family that matched the family details of Ruseau but were inconsistent with those of Daniel Blake Russell, the testimony of the owner of the Bloomer album and her father who identified the claimant as writing the verses under the name “James Rusaw” and expert witnesses who swore that the verses were written by the petitioner, the petitioner’s decision not to be examined by an independent surgeon for scars and tattoos, and William C. Russell’s sincere insistence that the petitioner was not his brother as reasons for his decision. Further, he wrote that the claimant’s reference to Daniel Blake Russell’s close friend Edward Frentz as “Edward French”, incorrect testimony that William Clifton Russell's middle name was Clifford, recalling butternut stains on his hands from the trees that were in fact buttonwoods, misidentifying Daniel Russell as being connected with a hose company instead of a manufacturer of rubber hose, and serious errors made when mapping the layout the Russell home were not mistakes the actual Daniel Blake Russell would make. He denied the petitioner's claim of fraud and forgery regarding the Ruseau letters and photographs because it would require too many conspirators.

Following the decision, a crowd of around 1,000 people visited the homes of those who testified against "Dakota Dan". The homes of Edward Frentz, Sidney H. Buttrick, and James R. Axford were attacked. Axford in turn threatened the mob with a golf club and was beaten by the mob. Effigies of Judge Lawton and Ferdinand Almy outside of the Russell home and fire was set to the Russell's fence. The fire department responded and were asked to turn their hoses on the crowd, but they refused. Two police officers standing on the Russell property were injured by the mob. The crowd dispersed after a plea from Mayor Eugene H. Moore.

== William C. Russell’s recognition of "Fresno Dan" ==
On April 14, 1910, William C. Russell issued a statement recognizing "Fresno Dan" as his brother. The statement read:

I desire to state publicly at this time that I am convinced and satisfied that Daniel Blake Russell, who has recently come to Boston from Fresno, California, is the son of my father, Daniel Russell, late of Melrose, and is my own brother.

"Fresno Dan" moved into the Russell home, which was guarded by detectives after the riot.

== Second trial ==
On April 20, 1910, Simpson filed an appeal on behalf of Dakota Dan. He was granted a second trial which began on July 16, 1912 and ended on June 6, 1913. Gilbert A. A. Pevey was appointed by Massachusetts Supreme Judicial Court to oversee the trial, which went on for 161 days and saw nearly 300 witnesses called. The two trials depleted the $500,000 Russell estate to $220,000.

On October 22, 1913, Peavey ruled that "Fresno Dan" was the true heir and "Dakota Dan" was Jim Russeau, an imposter who had "hynotized" (sic) dozens of well-meaning Melrose citizens into believing he was the true Daniel Blake Russell. His reported stated that "Dakota Dan" did not have the physical characteristics of the Russell family and that the "bold, illiterate, and immoral" Dakota Dan did not have the "bashful, refined, and delicate" Russell family traits that Fresno Dan possessed. Pevey's report removed the possibility of any further litigation regarding the estate and left "Dakota Dan" open to prosecution for perjury.

== Aftermath ==
William C. Russell died on November 28, 1913. His attorney and physician both believed that the trials had impacted his health and hastened his death. "Dakota Dan" suspected foul play and demanded an investigation. District attorney John J. Higgins ordered an autopsy at the request of one of Russell's cousins, Mrs. Fred Leach. Medical examiner Dr. Roscoe D. Perley performed the autopsy. He told reporters that every organ in Russell's body was diseased and that "it is a wonder that Mr. Russell didn't die 10 years ago". Fresno Dan received half of William C. Russell's estate, with the remaining half going to other relatives.

In December 1913, "Fresno Dan" told The Boston Globe that he had didn't have much experience with women because he had been poor most of his life and had not received any marriage proposals since inheriting the Russell estate. This led to a deluge of proposals, as well as threats from supporters of Dakota Dan. On December 12, Fresno Dan, tired of reading all of the letters he received, announced he would meet with potential suitors at his home the following afternoon and evening and would ask those who did not meet his standards to stop pursuing him. However, he was persuaded by members of the Russell family not to go through with this plan.

Dakota Dan was living in the Melrose area as late as 1915 and continued to claim that he was the rightful heir to the Russell estate. In 1929, the Boston American received a letter from Dakota Dan, then living in Harlowton, Montana, stating that he hoped to return to Melrose and prove his claim to the Russell estate. On February 18, 1932, the Melrose Home Sector published a letter James Cassell received from Dakota Dan, who stated that he was now 70 years of age, living in Gig Harbor, Washington, and had broken both of his legs in an automobile accident.

Judge Lawton drowned in Herring Pond in Eastham, Massachusetts on July 17, 1925.

"Fresno Dan" died on March 25, 1943. He had sold the Russell mansion several years before and was residing in a Melrose boarding house at the time of his death.
