= Chester Harvey Rowell =

Rowell in 1920

Chester Harvey Rowell (November 1, 1867 – April 12, 1948) was an early leader of the progressive movement in California.

== Biography ==
Born in Bloomington, Illinois, he earned a degree from the University of Michigan in 1888. His father was Jonathan H. Rowell, a U.S. congressman in Illinois.

Rowell studied three years in Europe, including terms at the Universities of Halle, Berlin, Paris and Rome. In 1898 he became the editor and manager of the Fresno Morning Republican, the newspaper founded by his uncle Dr. Chester Rowell. He remained as editor for 22 years.

Members of the Panama–Pacific International Exposition State Commission c. 1912–1915

In 1907, he was the co-founder and chairman (1907–1911) of the Lincoln-Roosevelt League, a coalition of progressive Republican activists. The league was instrumental in the election of Hiram Johnson as governor of California. In 1912, Rowell was a member of the sub-committee that wrote the national platforms for both the Republican and Progressive parties. He was appointed to the Panama–Pacific International Exposition Commission in 1911.

Later, Rowell was a lecturer in journalism at the University of California, Berkeley (1911) and in political science at Stanford University (1927–1934). He was editor of the San Francisco Chronicle (1932–1939). He was a member of the University of California Board of Regents from 1914 until shortly before his death in 1948.

He took an interest in the popularization of science. He also served on the board of trustees for Science Service, now known as Society for Science & the Public, from 1921 to 1923.

== Legacy ==
In 1964, Rowell was posthumously inducted into the California Newspaper Hall of Fame.
