= Lincoln–Roosevelt League =

League of Lincoln–Roosevelt Republican Clubs
- Founder: Chester H. Rowell; Edward Dickson
- Founded: 1907
- Dissolved: 1912
- Succeeded by: Progressive Party
- Ideology: Progressivism; Anti-monopolism; New Nationalism
- National affiliation: Republican Party

The Lincoln–Roosevelt League, officially known as the League of Lincoln–Roosevelt Republican Clubs, was founded in 1907 by California journalists Chester H. Rowell of the Fresno Morning Republican and Edward Dickson of the Los Angeles Express. Initially, it was a coalition of progressive Republican activists. Although it never had more than 100 members, the league was instrumental in the election of Hiram Johnson as governor of California in 1910 and the formation of the national Progressive ("Bull Moose") Party in 1912.

The initial aim of the league was to curb the power of the Southern Pacific Company in California politics. Some specific elements of their appeal for reform were a direct primary system (the voter initiative, referendum, and recall), as well as "the regulation of public utilities; the conservation of forests; the outlawing of child labor, prostitution, and gambling; hospital and prison reform; women's suffrage; and a minimum wage law for working women; the direct election of United States senators; the systemization of public finance; charter reform; public transportation."
