= Butler School (Lowell, Massachusetts) =

- U.S. National Register of Historic Places
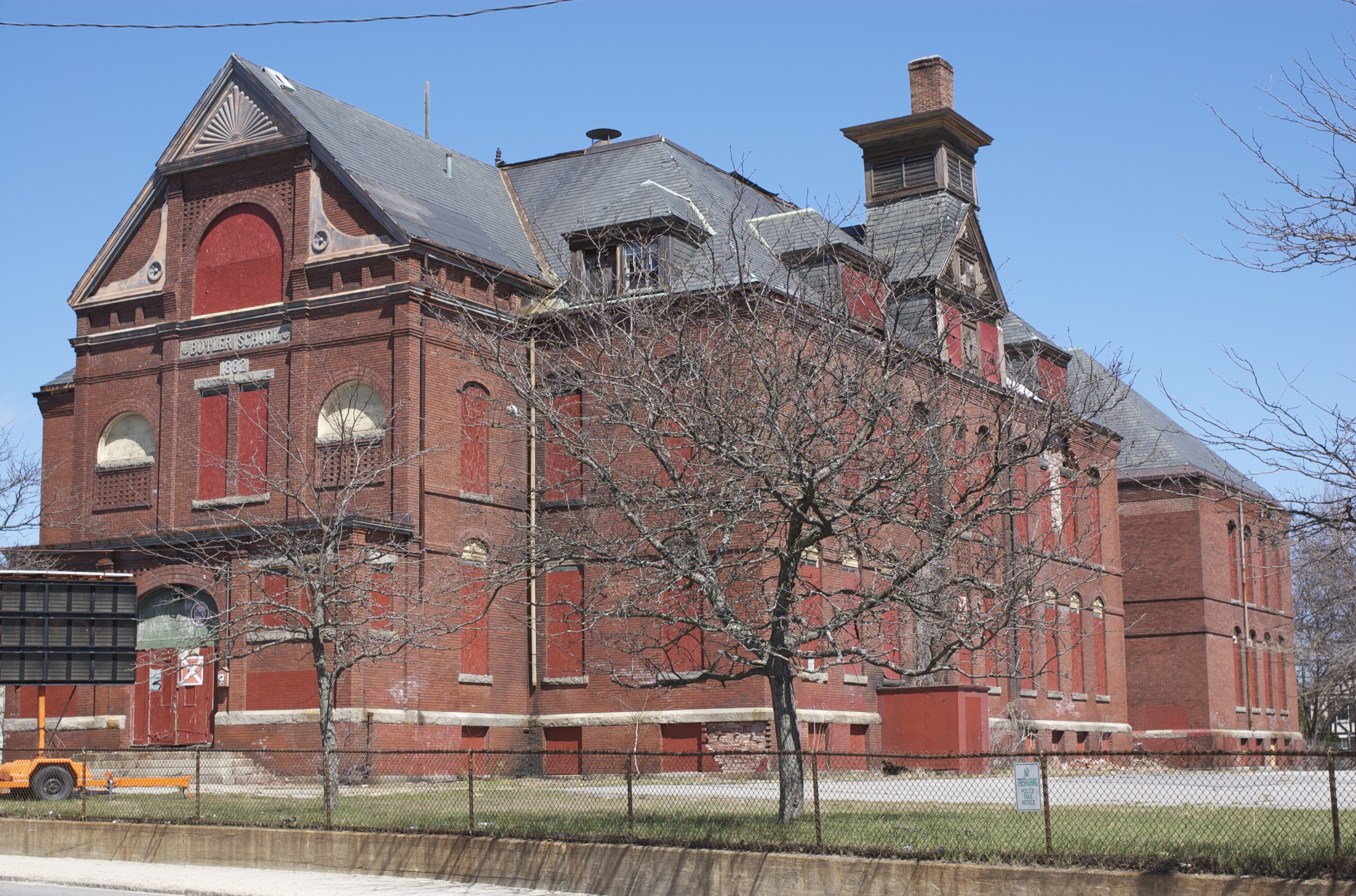

- Location within Massachusetts Location within the United States
- Location: Lowell, Massachusetts
- Coordinates: 42°37′50″N 71°18′30″W
- Built: 1882
- Architect: Stickney, Frederick W.
- Architectural style: Queen Anne
- Demolished: 2013
- NRHP reference No.: 94001634
- Added to NRHP: February 2, 1995

The Butler School was a historic school building at 812 Gorham Street in Lowell, Massachusetts. It was used by the Lowell Public Schools.

The school, named after Benjamin F. Butler, a longtime Lowell resident, Massachusetts Governor, and Civil War general, was built in 1882 and added to the National Register of Historic Places in 1995. Vacant since 1994, the building deteriorated. In May 2013, demolition began on the vacant building, and two new business buildings will be constructed on the lot.

A new Butler School facility was built further up Gorham Street in 1992.

== See also ==
- National Register of Historic Places listings in Lowell, Massachusetts
