= Chester Rowell =

American politician

Chester A. Rowell
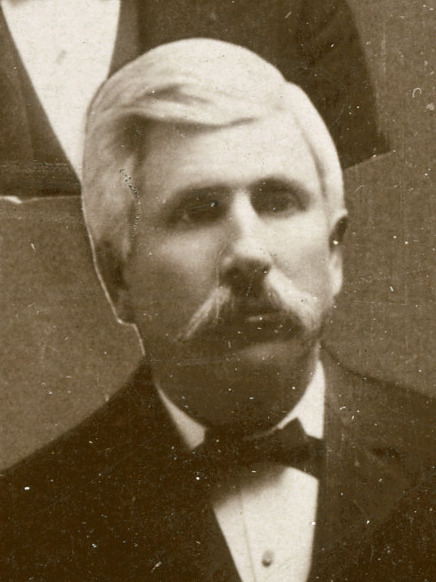

4th Mayor of Fresno
- In office April 26, 1909 – May 23, 1912
- Preceded by: Ed. F. Bush
- Succeeded by: Alva E. Snow

Member of the California State Senate
- In office January 2, 1899 – January 7, 1907
- Preceded by: Alfred Joel Pedlar
- Succeeded by: George W. Cartwright
- In office January 5, 1880 – January 8, 1883
- Succeeded by: Patrick Reddy
- Constituency: 4th district (1880–1883); 16th district (1899–1903); 26th district (1903–1907)

Personal details
- Born: Chester A Rowell; October 17, 1844 Woodsville, New Hampshire, U.S.
- Died: May 23, 1912 (aged 67) Los Angeles, California, U.S.
- Party: Republican
- Spouse: Nellie Imogene Rowell (m. 1872; died 1884)
- Children: Frank Rowell; Imogene Rowell
- Parent(s): Jonathan Barney Rowell, Cynthia Hay Abbott
- Relatives: Jonathan H. Rowell (brother), Chester Harvey Rowell (nephew)

Military service
- Allegiance: United States
- Branch/service: Union Army
- Years of service: 1861-1864
- Rank: Private
- Unit: 17th Illinois Infantry Regiment
- Battles/wars: Civil War: Fort Donelson; Battle of Shiloh; Siege of Vicksburg

Chester A. Rowell (October 17, 1844 – May 9, 1912) was an American physician and politician who served as a California state senator and as mayor of Fresno. He was also a regent of the University of California.

== Biography ==
Before moving to California, Dr. Rowell was a Union soldier in the Civil War mustered in the 17th Illinois Infantry along with four of his brothers. He took part in several battles between 1861 and 1864, including the Fort Donelson, the Battle of Shiloh and the Siege of Vicksburg.

Dr. Rowell arrived in Fresno in 1874 to practice medicine. In September 1876, he established the Fresno Republican newspaper. It was purchased by and eventually merged into the present-day Fresno Bee.

In 1879 he was elected to the state senate in California as a Republican. The county was heavily Democratic at the time, and Rowell was the first Republican to win an election in Fresno County.

In 1909 he received an overwhelming share of the vote to win the mayoral election.

Rowell commissioned the construction of Fresno's first skyscraper, now known as the Rowell building. It is six stories tall and located in downtown Fresno at the southeast corner of Tulare and Van Ness streets.

In 1914, Fresno commissioned Haig Patigian to create a memorial sculpture. The base of the memorial contains a relief where Rowell is shown seated at a patient's bedside. It can be found in the Fresno County Courthouse park, across the street from the Rowell family home in downtown Fresno.

Political offices
Preceded by Ed. F. Bush (acting)	4th Mayor of Fresno; 1909-1912	Succeeded by Alva E. Snow
