= Daniel Russell (Massachusetts politician) =

American politician

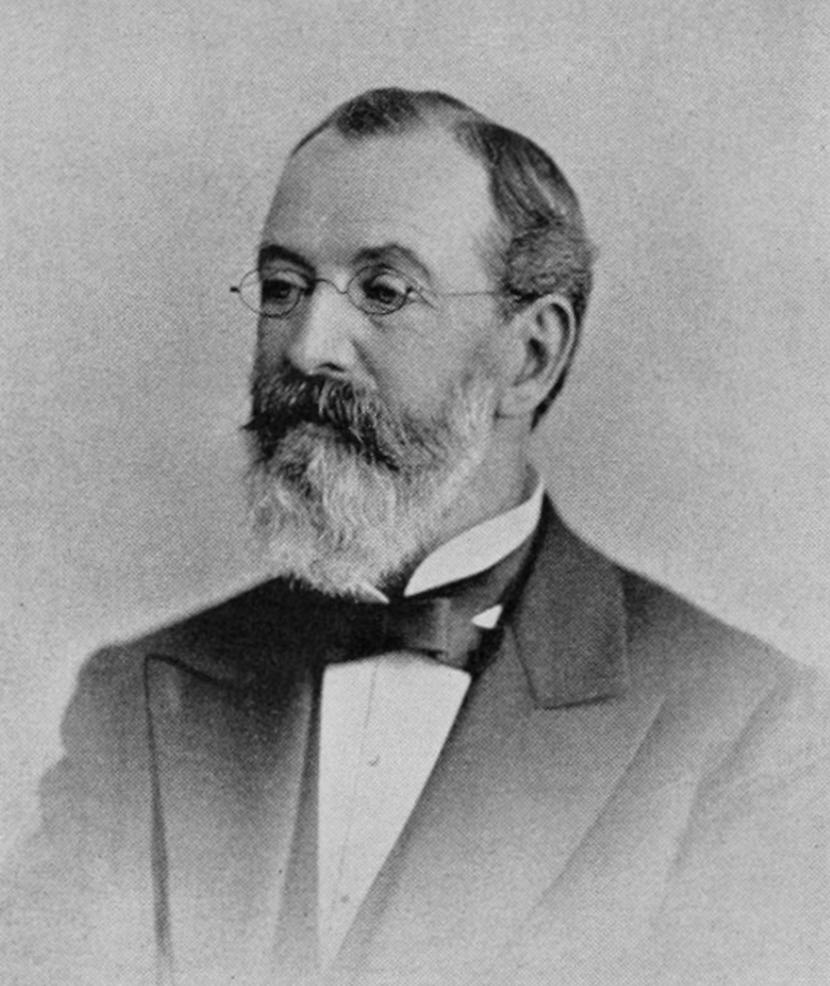

Member of the Massachusetts Senate for 6th Middlesex District
- In office 1879–1880
- Preceded by: Abraham B. Coffin
- Succeeded by: Thomas Winship

Personal details
- Born: July 10, 1824 Providence, Rhode Island, U.S.
- Died: January 23, 1907 (aged 82) Melrose, Massachusetts, U.S.
- Resting place: Wyoming Cemetery; Melrose, Massachusetts
- Party: Republican
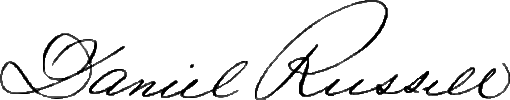
- Signature

Daniel Russell (July 10, 1824 – January 23, 1907) was an American politician who was a member of the Massachusetts Senate from 1879 to 1880.

== Career ==
Russell was born on July 10, 1824, in Providence, Rhode Island. He left school at the age of sixteen to work as a carriage painter. In 1847, he moved to Boston and worked as a clothing salesman. After three years with Edward Locke & Co., Russell moved to Isaac Fenno & Co., where he became a partner in 1861. He retired in 1869 due to poor health, but his health eventually recovered.

In 1852, Russell moved to Melrose, Massachusetts. He was the president of the Melrose Savings Bank and a director of the Malden and Melrose Gas Company. He served on the town's board of selectmen and water loan sinking fund commission. From 1879 to 1880, he represented the 6th Middlesex District in the Massachusetts Senate. He was a delegate to the 1880 Republican National Convention.

== Personal life ==
Russell and his wife, Mary Lynde, had two sons, William C. Russell and Daniel Blake Russell. Lynde died in 1899 and afterwards, Russell's niece Sarah Almy was his caretaker.

Russell was a charter member of the Hugh de Payens Commandery Knights Templar and was the organist for the Wyoming Lodge of Masons for 35 years. He was also a trustee of the Universalist Church.

== Death ==
Russell died on January 23, 1907, after a brief illness. A funeral with masonic honors was held at his home and he was buried at Wyoming Cemetery. He left his estate to his two sons. Two men claiming to be Daniel Blake Russell, who had disappeared in 1885, appeared following Russell's death, which led to a four-year legal battle over the estate.
