= Timeline of Fresno, California =

Coordinates: 36.750°N 119.767°W

Fresno is a city in the San Joaquin Valley of California, United States, founded in 1872 and incorporated in 1885. It is the county seat of Fresno County and the largest city in the greater Central Valley region.

== 19th century ==
- 1856 – Fresno County formed in 1856 with Millerton, a settlement along the San Joaquin River, as the county seat.
- 1865 – William Helm brings his wife and his sheep to the valley floor area south of Millerton.
- 1870 - Weekly Expositor newspaper in publication.
- 1872 – Fresno station founded by the Central Pacific Railroad Company
- 1874 – County seat of Fresno County moves from Millerton to Fresno due to population growth.
- 1875
  - Fresno County Courthouse built.
  - Central California Colony established south of Fresno, creating a successful model for attracting settlers.
- 1876 – Fresno Morning Republican newspaper in publication.
- 1877 – Fresno Volunteer Fire Department organized.
- 1881 - William Helm bought the block bounded by Fresno, R, Merced and S Streets from Louis Einstein.
- 1882 – St. John Church built.
- 1884 – Big Fresno Fair begins.
- 1885 – Fresno incorporated.
- 1889 – Meux Home built.
- 1890
  - Barton opera house opens.
  - Population exceeds 10,000.
- 1892 - Street cars introduced
- 1893 – Fresno Free Public Library opens.
- 1894
  - Fresno Parlor Lecture Club organized.
  - Fresno Water Tower built.
  - San Francisco-Fresno bike messenger service (during the Pullman Strike) initiated.
- 1899 – Santa Fe Passenger Depot opens.
- 1900 – Population: 12,470.

== 20th century ==
=== 1900s–1940s ===
- 1901
  - Fresno City Railway in operation.
  - Fresno Buddhist Temple founded.
- 1904
  - Gottschalks shop in business.
  - First Butcher Shop Opened by Andrew David Green
- 1906 – Forestiere Underground Gardens begin developing.
- 1908 – Asparēz Armenian/English-language newspaper begins publication.
- 1909 – Raisin Day festival begins.
- 1910 – Fresno Junior College opens.
- 1911
  - Fresno State Normal School founded.
  - Sunnyside Country Club opens.
- 1913 – Commercial Club organized.
- 1914 – Holy Trinity Church built.
- 1918
  - Sun-Maid raisin facility begins operating.
  - Bank of Italy building constructed.
- 1919 – Fresno Historical Society and Temple Beth Israel founded.
- 1921 – Fresno State College established.
- 1922
  - KMJ 580AM Radio begins broadcasting.
  - Fresno Bee newspaper begins publication.
- 1923
  - Fort Washington Country Club established.
  - San Joaquin Light and Power Corporation Building constructed.
- 1925 – Security Pacific Bank Building constructed.
- 1926 – Fresno State Stadium dedicated.
- 1928 – Pantages Theater opens.
- 1929
  - Roeding Park Zoo opens.
  - Z. S. Leymel becomes mayor.
  - Chandler Airport opens as area's primary airport.
- 1932 – Fresno Memorial Auditorium built.
- 1935 – Academy (social group) formed.
- 1939 – Tower Theatre opens.
- 1942 – U.S. Air Force Hammer Airfield and Japanese American internment camp in use.
- 1944 – Pacific Bible Institute founded.
- 1946 – Sierra Sky Park Airport residential aviation community established near city.
- 1947 – Hammer Field National Guard training area and Fresno Air Terminal established, becoming primary hub of commercial aviation instead of Chandler Airport.
- 1948 – Azteca Theater built.

=== 1950s–1990s ===
- 1954 – Peoples Church and Fresno Philharmonic founded.
- 1955 – Bernice F. Sisk becomes U.S. representative for California's 12th congressional district.
- 1960 – Mexican American Political Association founded.
- 1961 – City of Fresno Takes over municipal bus service.
- 1962 – Farm Workers Association founding meeting held in Fresno.
- 1964 - Fulton Mall dedicated.
- 1966
  - Fresno Convention Center complex built.
  - Fresno County Courthouse rebuilt.
- 1967 – Catholic Diocese of Fresno established.
- 1968 - Woodward Park opened in north Fresno.
- 1969 – Kiddie Kinema movie theatre opens.
- 1970
  - Fashion Fair Mall in business.
  - Population: 167,927.
- 1973 – Good Company Players founded.
- 1977 – KMTF television begins broadcasting.
- 1983 – Fresno Metronews begins publication.
- 1984
  - Nanaksar Gurdwara founded.
  - Fresno Metropolitan Museum established.
- 1989
  - Fresno Municipal Sanitary Landfill closes.
  - Karen Humphrey becomes mayor.
- 1990
  - Vida en el Valle Spanish/English-language newspaper begins publication.
  - Population: 354,202.
- 1992 – Hmong Times newspaper in publication.
- 1993
  - Hmong Today (television program) begins broadcasting.
  - San Joaquin Valley Heritage & Genealogy Center established.
  - Jim Patterson becomes mayor.
- 1996 – Tahoe Joe's restaurant in business.
- 1997
  - Community Food Bank active.
  - River Park shopping center in business.
- 1998
  - City website online.
  - Fresno Grizzlies baseball team formed.
  - Fresno Stadium 22 cinema opens.
- 2000
  - University High School established.
  - Mormon Fresno California Temple dedicated.

== 21st century ==
- 2001 - Alan Autry becomes mayor.
- 2002 - Grizzlies Stadium opens.
- 2003
  - Save Mart Center (arena) opens.
  - Ani-Jam anime convention begins.
- 2005
  - Woodward Shakespeare Festival and Artists' Repertory Theatre founded.
  - Jim Costa becomes U.S. representative for California's 20th congressional district.
  - Coyle United States Courthouse built.
- 2008 – Neighborhood Thrift shop in business.
- 2009 – Ashley Swearengin becomes mayor.
- 2010
  - Fresno Metropolitan Museum closes.
  - Population: 494,665.
- 2012 - Fresno meat plant shooting.
- 2013
  - Poet laureate inaugurated.
  - Bitwise Industries launches, bringing a technology and entrepreneur community together. Starts with Bitwise Mural District, and more Fresno campuses follow.
- 2014 - Fresno General Plan adopted, becoming the first one in decades to not expand the Sphere of Influence.
- 2015
  - On January 6, Governor Jerry Brown attends a groundbreaking ceremony for California High-Speed Rail in downtown Fresno at the future location of Fresno's High Speed Rail Station.
  - Fresno declares drought; worst recorded precipitation levels in 130 years. Water use reduction/conservation begins.
- 2017 – 2017 Fresno shootings.
- 2019 – 2019 Fresno shooting.
- 2020 -
  - COVID-19 has affected the Fresno area, which resulted in lock-downs and temporary retail business closures.
  - Population: 542,161.
- 2021 - Former Police Chief Jerry Dyer becomes Fresno's 26th mayor.

== See also ==
- History of Fresno
- National Register of Historic Places listings in Fresno County, California
- Timelines of other cities in the Northern California area of California: Mountain View, Oakland, Sacramento, San Francisco, San Jose
