= Fulton Mall (Fresno) =

Former pedestrian mall in Fresno, California

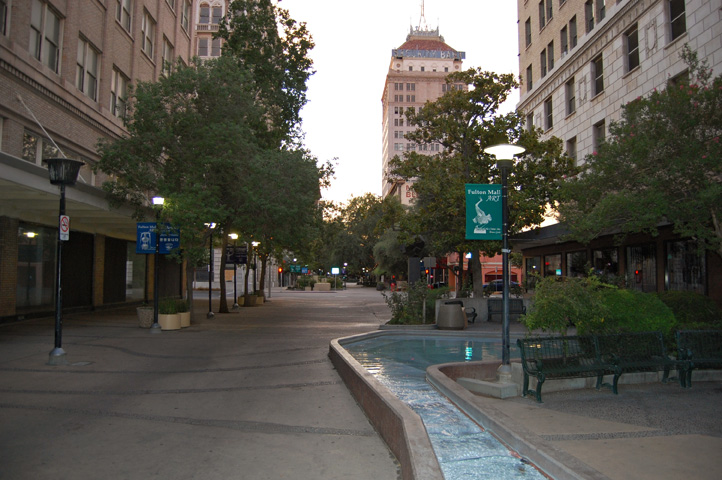
- Fulton Mall between Kern and Tulare Streets in 2011, before reintroduction of traffic
- Type: Pedestrian Mall
- Location: Fresno, California
- Coordinates: 36.7348°N 119.7912°W

Construction
- Construction start: March 31, 1964
- Completed: September 1, 1964
- Demolished: March 3, 2016

Other
- Designer: Garrett Eckbo as part of EDAW
- Known for: Modernist landscape design

The Fulton Mall was a six-block corridor in downtown Fresno, California which was closed to traffic in 1964 and made into a pedestrians only mall. Despite opening to much fanfare, the downtown mall suffered from the city's suburban expansion, especially the opening of the Fashion Fair Mall six miles to the north. By the 1980s, most storefronts on the mall were empty and plans to renovate the mall were discussed. In 2017, car traffic was reintroduced to the street after most of the public art and amenities had been relocated to sidewalk areas.

The mall was an early example of the design intent and masterplan-oriented thought process of shopping mall pioneer Victor Gruen, whose ideas were emulated, albeit in a modified form, across the United States. The mall is also an example of noted landscape architect Garrett Eckbo's modernist landscape design ethos.

== History ==
=== Pedestrian mall ===
Fulton Street, originally J Street, has been a main corridor for business activity for Fresno since the city's inception. It sits a block over from the Fresno station (California High-Speed Rail), the primary way early visitors came to Fresno. J Street was renamed "Fulton" in honor of prominent local financier Fulton G. Berry after his death in 1910.

Several notable buildings were constructed on Fulton Street, including the 10-story Helm Building in 1914, which was called Fresno's first skyscraper. Locally-founded Gottschalks moved into a large retail space on Fulton Street in 1914. The 8-story Bank of Italy building followed in 1918 as well as the Rustigian Building on the south end of Fulton Street, completed in 1920. Adding to the retail activity in the area, the Radin-Kamp Department Store opened on Fulton Street in 1924. The historic San Joaquin Light and Power Corporation Building and the Warnors Theater sit on the north end of Fulton Street, both built in the 1920s.

Fresno experienced a population boom after World War II, reaching 100,000 in 1958. Much of the growth pushed northward, with Fresno State relocating in 1956. Retail centers opened to the north in the late 1950s as well, such as Manchester Center and Fig Garden Village. To revitalize downtown, the Arthur L. Selland-led city of Fresno hired pioneering Austrian architect Victor Gruen who had attempted similar revitalization projects in Kalamazoo, Michigan and Fort Worth, Texas.

Under Gruen's supervision, Fulton street was transformed into a pedestrian-only space named Fulton Mall. The project was designed by American landscape architect Garrett Eckbo, as part of his EDAW landscape architecture design firm. The mall was dedicated on September 1, 1964, to much fanfare. The mall contained major retailers such as Gottschalks, Montgomery Ward, Woolworth, and JCPenney.

The mall was designed as a social space, a focus of community interest and events, a promenade and rendezvous with friends, a play area for children, and a meeting place for teenagers.

— Garrett Eckbo, People in a Landscape (1998)

The opening of Fashion Fair Mall in 1970 indicated that the Fresno's northward sprawl was not abating. The Fulton Mall declined, with one notable example occurring in 1988 when Gottschalks, an anchor since 1914, moved from the mall to the Woodward Park area.

Fresno poet Gary Soto memorialized the street scene of Fulton Mall in a 2001 poem.

=== Reintroducing traffic ===
In 2002, a city redevelopment agency presented a plan to the city council proposing to return auto traffic to the Fulton Mall. The move was opposed by a group of citizens called the Downtown Fresno Coalition. In 2006, the city council called for another study of the Fulton Mall so that a decision could be made but the standoff only intensified.

In 2008, the preservationist citizens group prepared a nomination of the Fulton Mall to the National Register of Historic Places (NRHP) in an effort to block or complicate the reintroduction of cars. The mall was deemed eligible for the NRHP but was not listed due to objections from the city administration and a majority of the property owners.

Mayor Ashley Swearengin commissioned a plan which included three options for renovating the mall. Two of the options returned car traffic with varying degrees of preservation of the existing mall features and amenities. The third option kept the mall pedestrian free.

In September 2013, the City of Fresno received a $15.9 million TIGER Grant from the US Department of Transportation to reintroduce traffic to Fulton. On February 27, 2014, the Fresno City Council decided the fate of Fulton Mall with a 5–2 vote in favor of putting traffic back on Fulton street while preserving as much of the character of the original design as possible.

A groundbreaking ceremony was held on March 3, 2016. The $20 million project was completed in October 2017 and the reopening was attended by mayor Lee Brand, former mayor Swearengin, representative Jim Costa and others.

== Notable features ==
=== Public Art ===
Money was raised from private donors to buy or commission public art and install it on the mall.

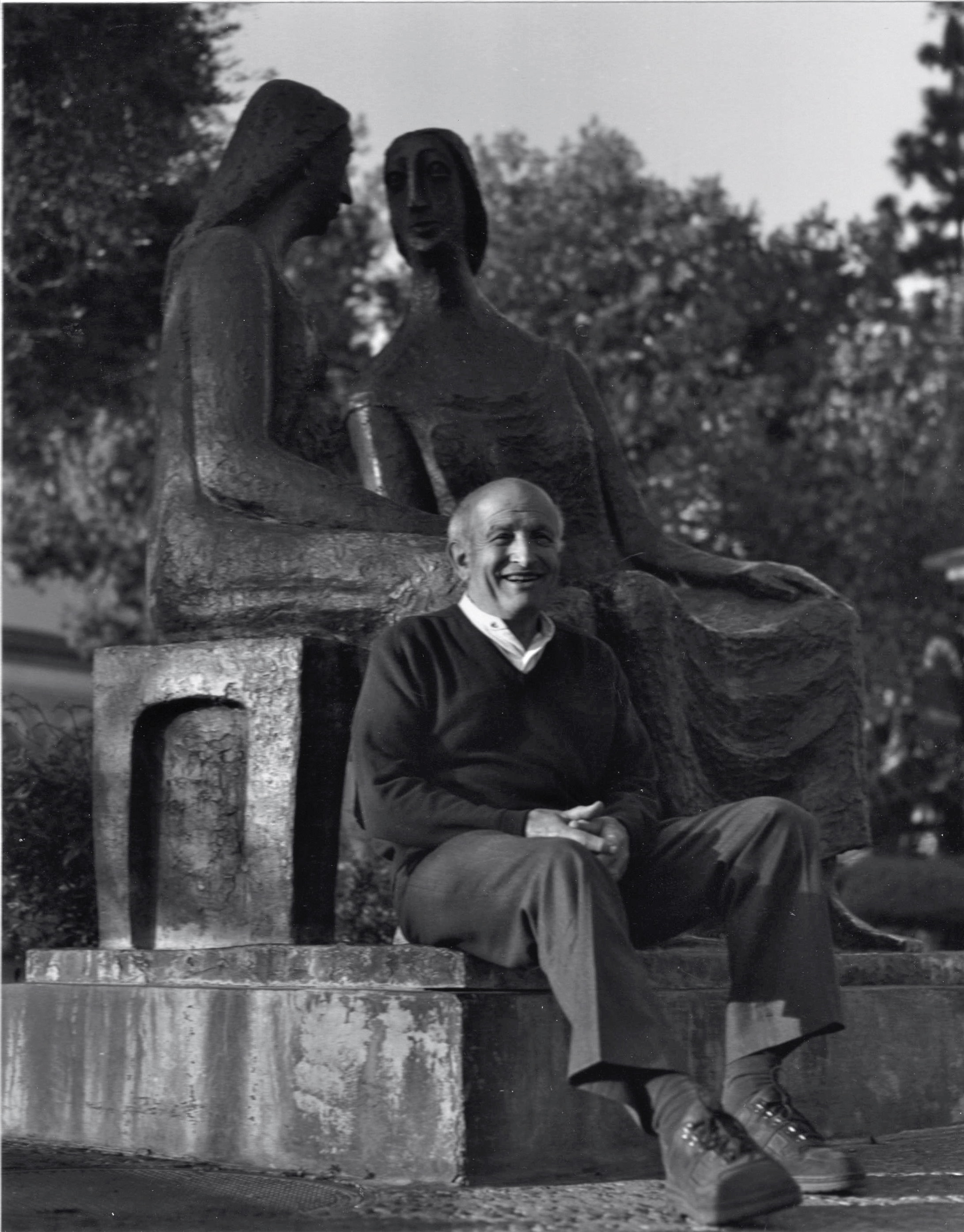
Clement Renzi in front of his The Visit sculpture installed on the north end of the mall.

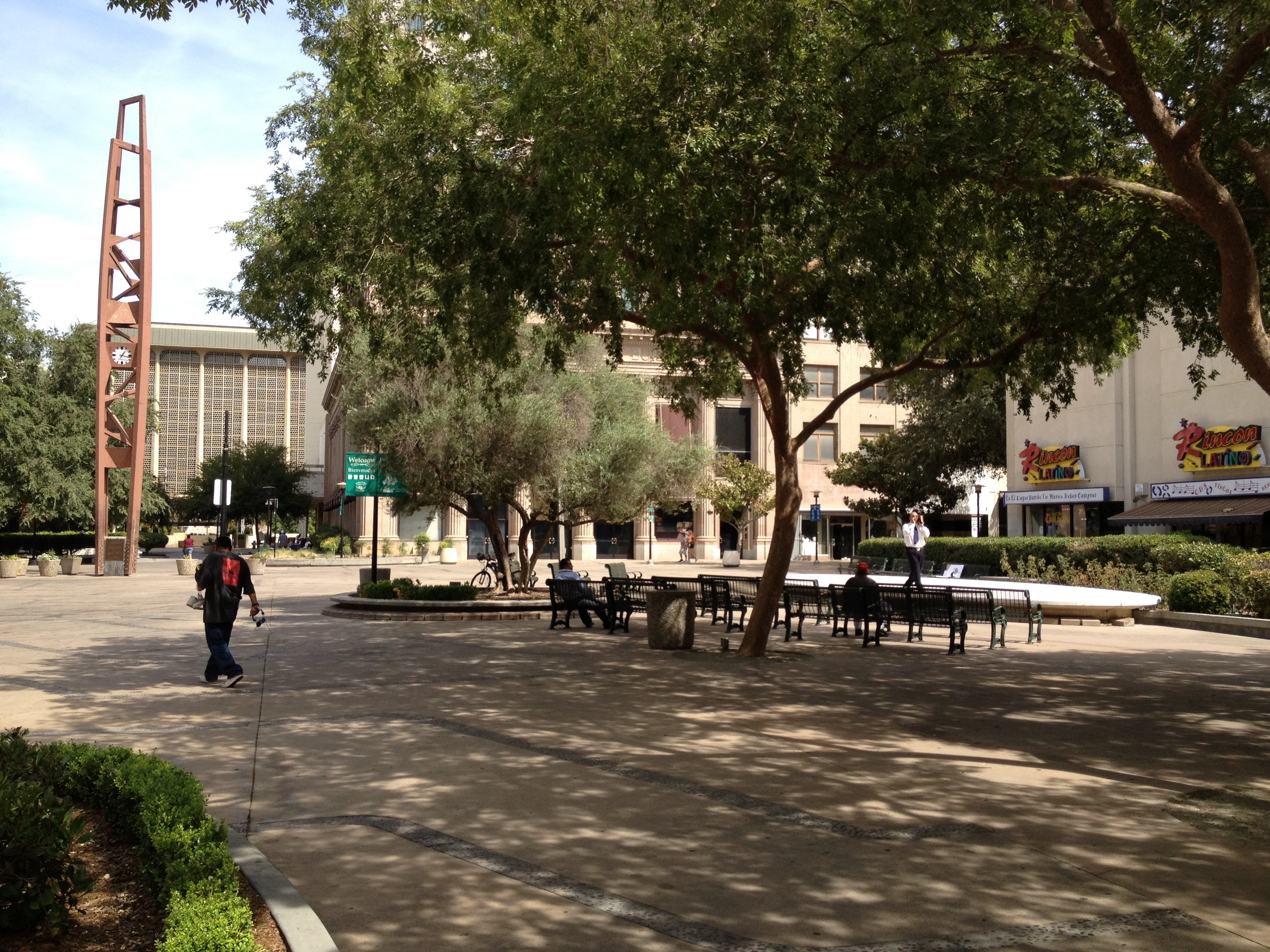
Historic concrete platform which was the site of a free speech fight and the Clock Tower installation at the center of the mall.

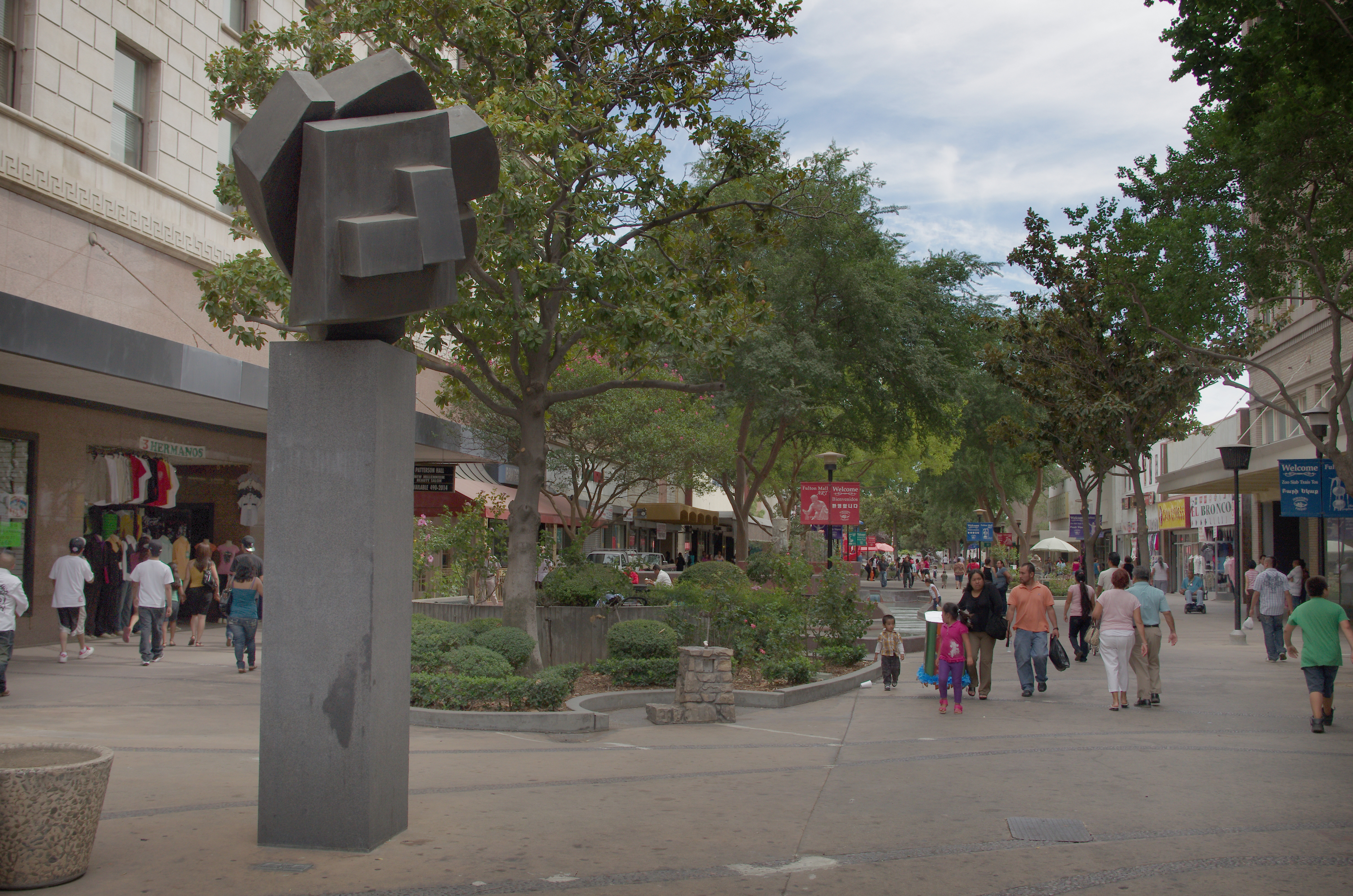
Orion Sculpture in 2011.

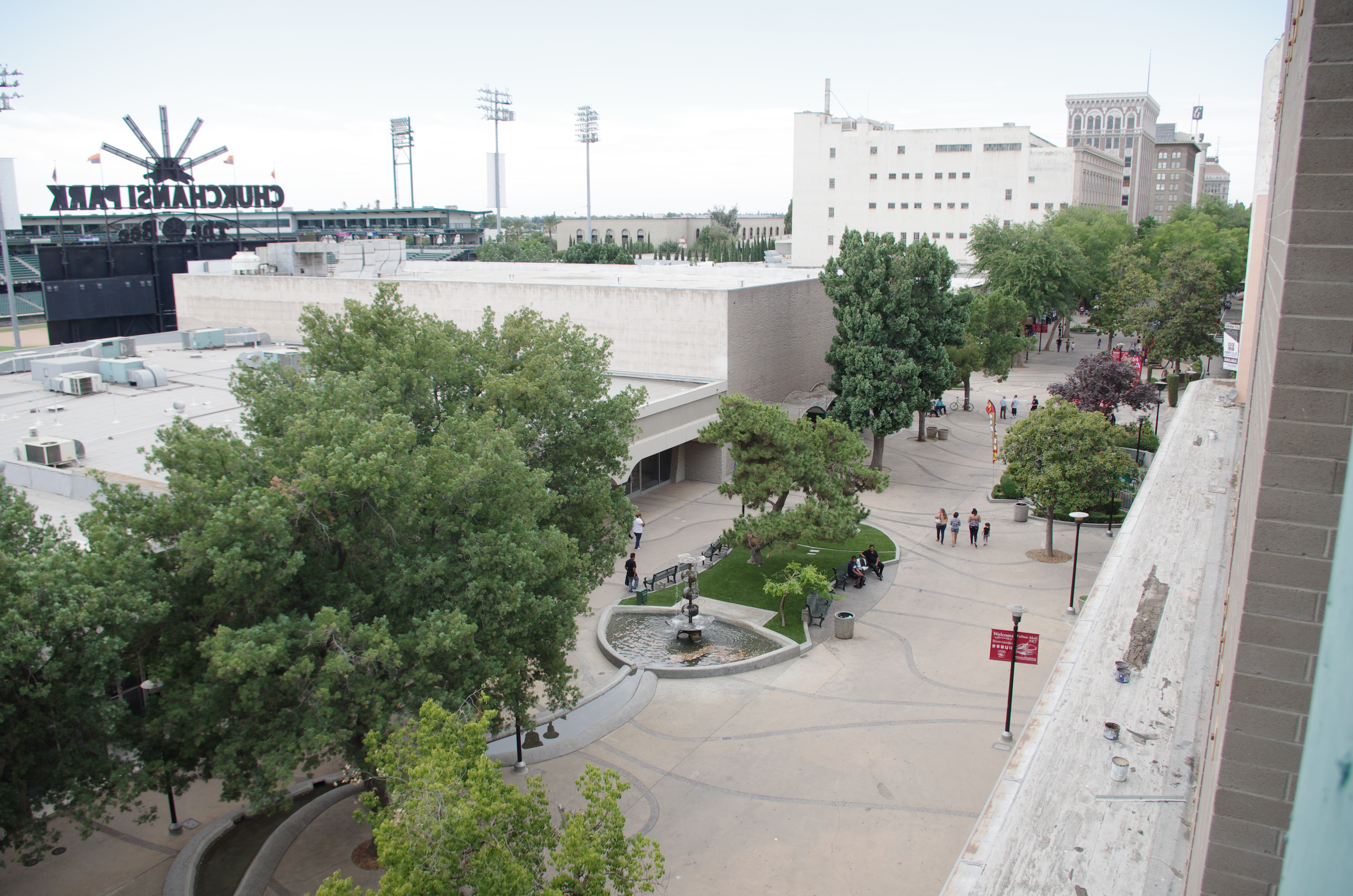
South end of Fulton Mall in 2011. Obos fountain is seen in the center of the frame.

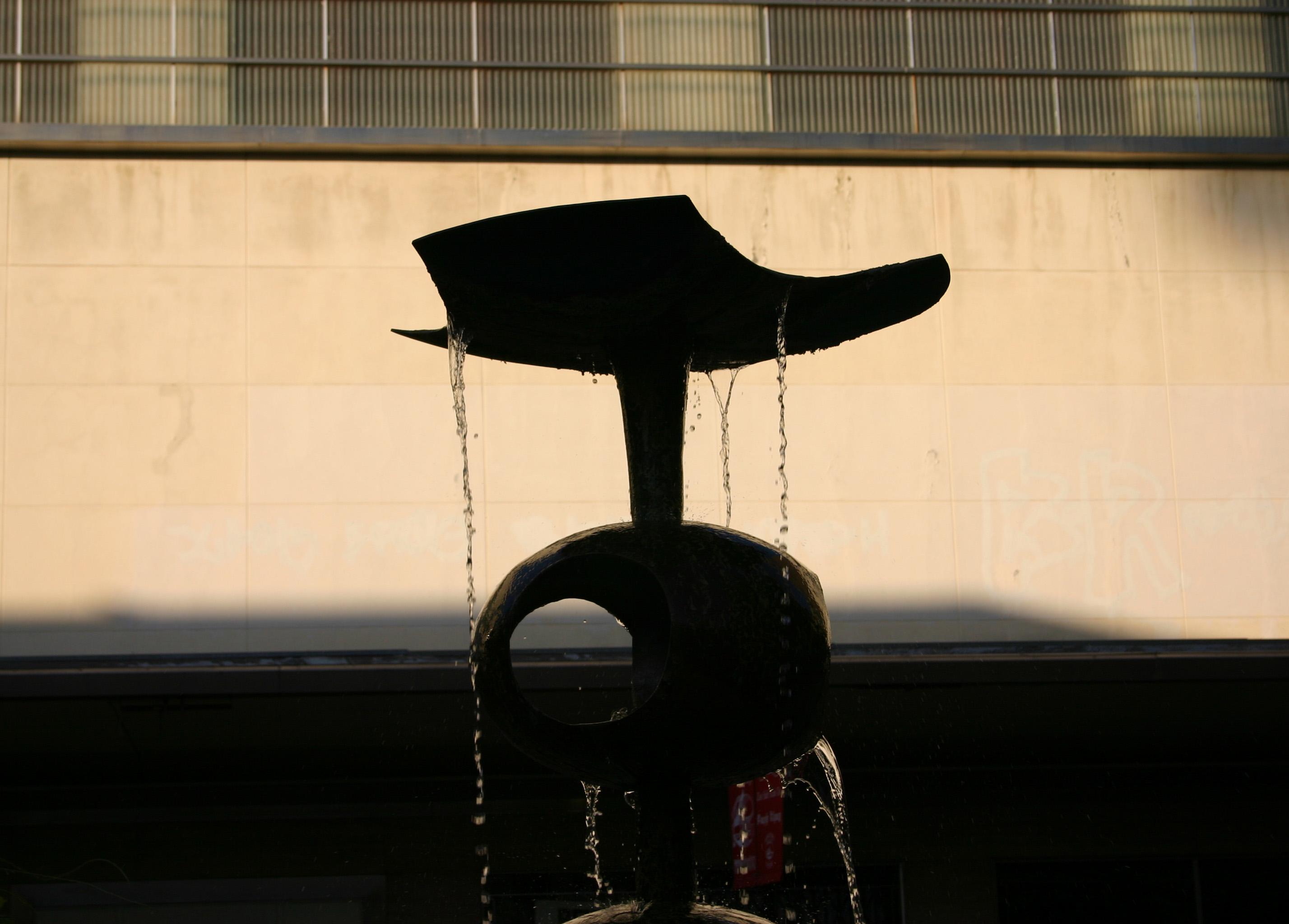
Obos fountain at sunset in 2005

- The Visit by Clement Renzi.
- Rite of the Crane by Bruno Groth, a 6 feet (1.8 m) high bronze sculpture.
- Talos by James Lee Hansen, a predecessor to Talos No. 2 in Portland, Oregon.
- Aquarius Ovoid by George Tsutakawa, a brass sculpture.
- Trisem by T. Newton Russell, an installation of three columns of granite boulders, approximately 12 feet (3.7 m) high, set inside of a pool water feature.
- Dancing Waters by Stan Bitters.
- Valley Landing by Gordon Newell, a sculpture made of black granite from a local quarry.
- La Grand Laveuse (Washer Woman) by Pierre Auguste Renoir.
- A concrete platform commemorating the location where the Industrial Workers of the World fought for the right of free speech in their efforts to organize labor in Fresno. It is registered on the list of California Historical Landmarks as number 873.
- Clock Tower by Jan de Swart, an approximately 60 feet (18 m) high installation made of wood and fiberglass. It includes four clocks at the top which face in each direction.
- Big A by Peter Voulkos, a sculpture consisting of aluminum pillars and cross plates with bronze ovals on the plates.
- Arbre Echelle by Brancois Stahly, an approximately 10 feet (3.0 m) high bronze sculpture.
- Orion by Bernard Rosenthal.
- Mother & Child by Romondo Puccinelli, a porpyry sculpture approximately 2.5 feet (0.76 m) high, on an approximately 3 feet (0.91 m) high base of locally sourced granite.
- Ellipsoid VI by Charles Owen Perry, an approximately 4 feet (1.2 m) high bronze plate sculpture located in the middle of a pool water feature.
- Smoldering Fires by Claire Falkenstein.
- Yokuts Native American by Clement Renzi, a cast bronze sculpture representing a member of the Yokuts tribe standing with his arms stretched upward to greet the rising run.
- Obos by George Tsutakawa, an approximately 10 feet (3.0 m) high bronze sculpture fountain. Obos are said to represent stacked stones found in the Himalayas.

Most mall features were relocated from the middle of the mall to the sidewalk areas in 2016, making way for vehicular traffic. There were moved to approximately following locations:

	Mural District
	Fulton Street
Stanislaus St.	Fulton Street	Stanislaus St.
PG&E Building	Fulton Street	Warnors Theater
Tuolumne St.	Fulton Street	Tuolumne St.
	Fulton Street	The Visit
Talos	Fulton Street	Rite of the Crane
Merced St.	Fulton Street	Merced St.
Brix Building	Fulton Street	Trisem
	Fulton Street	Aquarius Ovoid
Fresno St.	Fulton Street	Fresno St.
Guarantee Savings Building	Fulton Street	Valley Landing
Helm Building	Fulton Street	La Grande Laveuse
Big A	Fulton Street
Mariposa St.	Fulton Street	Mariposa St.
Clock Tower	Fulton Street	Pacific Southwest Building
Mariposa Plaza	Fulton Street	Arbre Echelle
	Fulton Street	Mason Building
Tulare St.	Fulton Street	Tulare St.
	Fulton Street	T. W. Patterson Building
Orion	Fulton Street	Mother & Child
	Fulton Street	Ellipsoid VI
Dancing Waters; Smoldering Fires	Fulton Street	Kern St.
	Fulton Street	Old Gottschalks Building
	Fulton Street	Obos
	Fulton Street	Yokuts Native American
	Fulton Street	Spiral Garage
Inyo St.	Fulton Street	Inyo St.
	Brewery District
