= Renzi (surname) =

Renzi is an Italian surname. Notable people with the surname include:

- Andrea Renzi (actor) (born 1963), Italian actor
- Andrea Renzi (basketball) (born 1989), Italian professional basketball player
- Anna Renzi (c.1620–after 1660), Italian opera singer
- Carli Renzi (born 1982), Australian judo competitor and wrestler
- Clement Renzi (1925–2009), American sculptor
- Eva Renzi (1944–2005), German actress
- Grace Renzi (1922–2011), American painter
- Lorenzo Renzi (born 1939), Italian linguist and philologist
- Maggie Renzi (born 1951), American film producer and actress
- Matteo Renzi (born 1975), 56th Prime Minister of Italy
- Mike Renzi (1941–2021), American composer, music director, pianist and jazz musician
- Nicola Renzi (born 1979), Sammarinese politician
- Pina Renzi (1901–1984), Italian film actress
- Renzo Renzi (born 1956), Sammarinese politician
- Rick Renzi (born 1958), American politician

== Fictional characters ==
- Carlo Renzi, a character in The Sopranos TV series
