= Richard Felchlin =

American architect

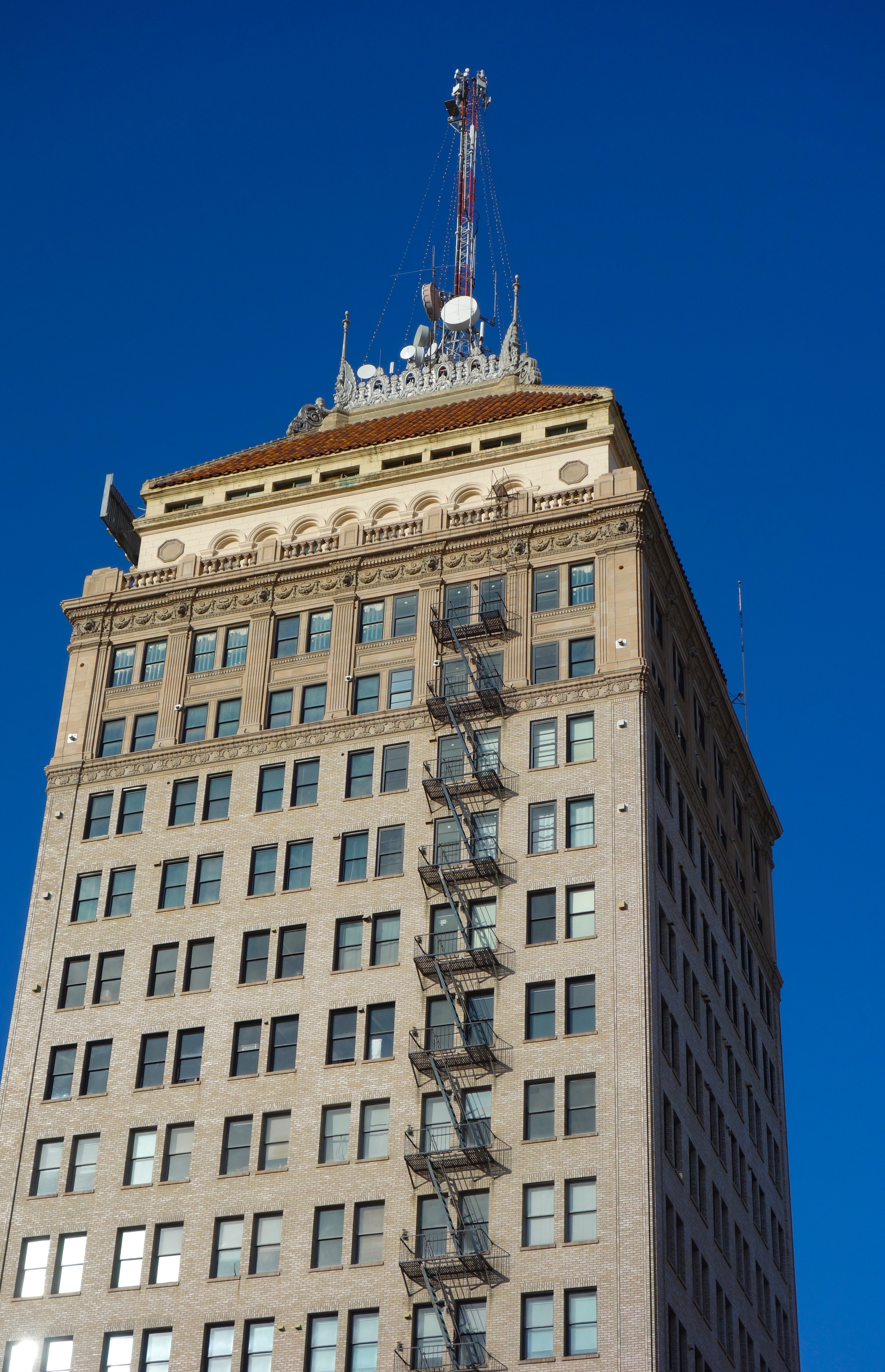
Pacific Southwest Building

Richard Ferdinant Felchlin (October 9, 1888 – January 6, 1960) was a civil engineer who designed many of the buildings that give downtown Fresno, California its architectural character. He studied civil engineering at the University of California, then moved to Fresno and entered practice. He was born in Stockton, California.

== Notable buildings ==
Felchlin and his Fresno company R.F. Felchlin Company (later Felchlin, Shaw, & Franklin) designed many notable Fresno commercial and residential buildings, a number of which are now on the National Register of Historic Places.

Commercial buildings designed by Felchlin and his firm include:

=== On National Register in Fresno ===
- San Joaquin Light and Power Corporation Building (1923)
- Bank of Italy building (1918)
- California Hotel (1922)
- Kindler home

=== Others in Fresno ===
- Fresno Pacific Towers (1925) which stood as the tallest structure in the city for 80 years.

=== Los Angeles ===
- Myer Siegel department store, 733 S. Flower St., Downtown Los Angeles (1926-7)
Richard Felchlin buildings
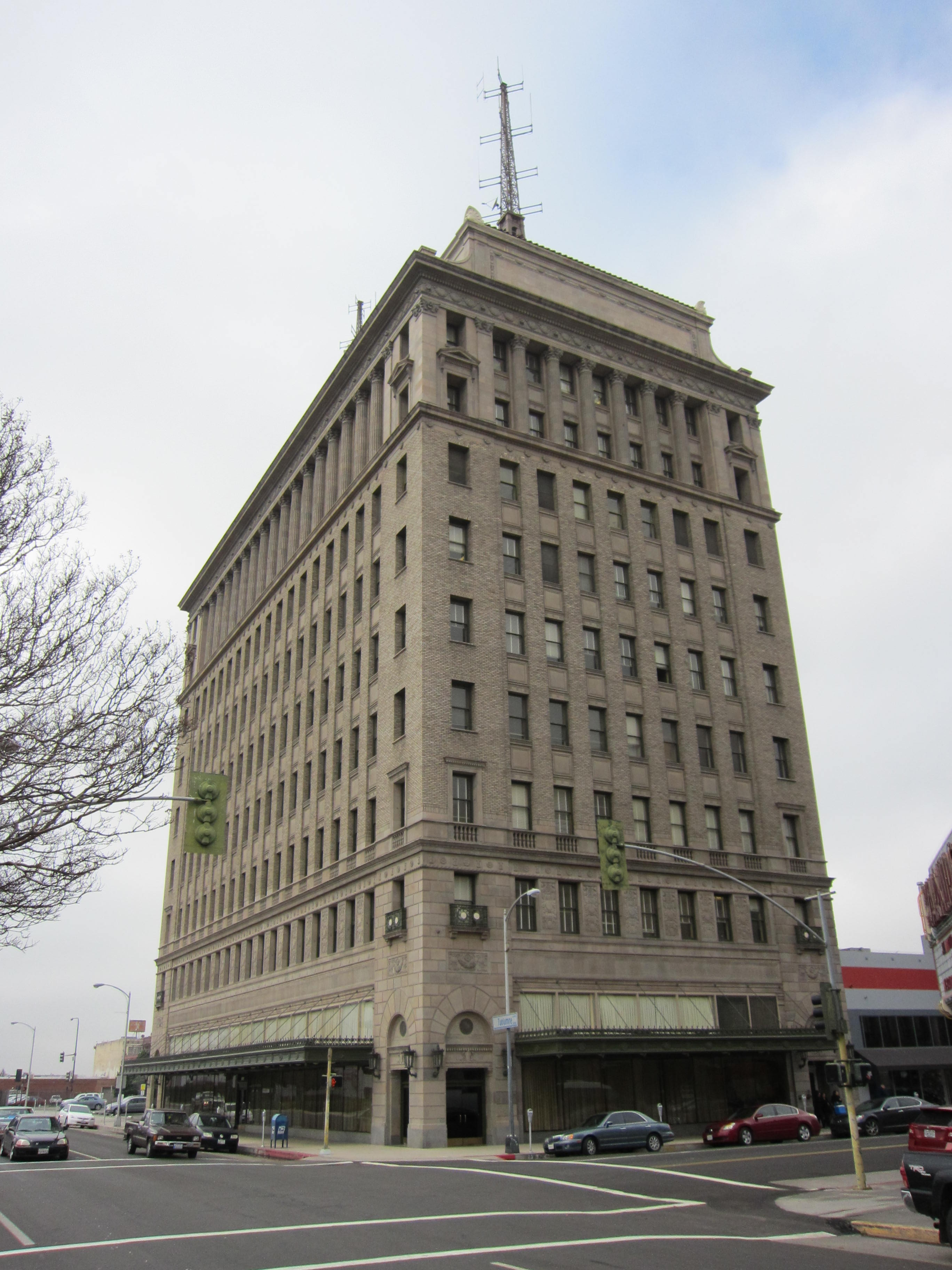
San Joaquin Light and Power Corporation Building

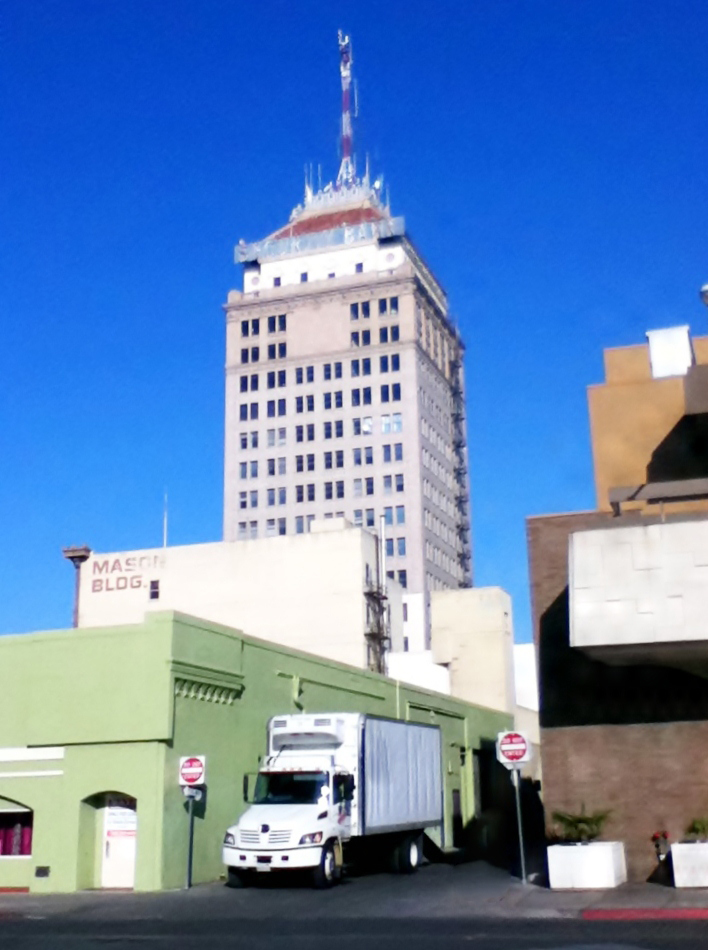
Fresno Pacific Towers

== See also ==
- List of Registered Historic Places in California#Fresno County
