= Fresno Christian High School =

School in California, United States

Fresno Christian Schools

Location
- 7280 North Cedar Avenue; Fresno, California; United States (36°50.596′N 119°45.292′W)

Information
- Type: Private
- Established: 1977
- Grades: K-12
- Colors: Maroon and Black
- Nickname: Eagles
- Accreditation: Association of Christian Schools International and Western Association of Schools and Colleges
- Newspaper: The Feather
- Website: www.fresnochristian.com

Fresno Christian High School (abbr. FCHS) is a private, Christian high school sponsored by 12 evangelical churches, located in Fresno, California, United States. The high school is a division of Fresno Christian Schools, offering various classes from Kindergarten through Grade 12. Grades K–12 share a campus with Peoples Church at 7280 N. Cedar Ave.

== History ==
Although conceived several years earlier, Fresno Christian Schools finally became a reality in 1977. Founded by seven local churches, the school aims to provide a quality learning environment and encourage God’s word within the classroom. In 1977, the school began classes, with 135 students in grades K-6. Now, the school continues to provide Christian educations to over 700 students in grades K-12, spread over two campuses. The student body typically represents over 100 different churches, and includes students from as far as Kerman, Kingsburg, Sanger, Selma, and Madera. FCS has been recognized nationally as an example of how Christians can cooperate to provide a quality alternative Christian school for a total community.

== Mission ==
The Mission of Fresno Christian Schools is to equip young people for life and service for Jesus Christ through biblical foundations, character development, and academic preparation in partnership with the home and local church. FCS gives special attention to meeting the spiritual, moral, academic, and physical needs of the student both in the formal classroom setting and in extracurricular and social activities.

== Church involvement ==
Peoples Church hosts Fresno Christian Junior/Senior High School (grades 7–12) and Fresno Christian Elementary (grades K–6). In addition to providing location, Peoples Church is also a founding partner of Fresno Christian Schools.

== Extracurricular activities ==
=== Yearbook ===
The Shield, Fresno Christian High School's annual yearbook publication, is written and designed by a group of students. The Shield has received numerous awards and recognition by various scholastic press associations both locally and nationally. Approximately 250 yearbooks are ordered annually, and the yearbook fee is included with the yearly tuition beginning fall 2008. The yearbooks are published by Jostens.

=== Newspaper ===
2015-16 school year: Fresno Christian's award-winning newspaper is The Feather Online. As of September 2015, The Feather Online staff numbers in excess of 50 members, whose goal is to "reflect, represent, inform, and entertain the student body through the campus news, features, profiles, and sports activities." The Feather Online is a daily multimedia newspaper, which publishes over 900 articles during each school year. This does not include the game-by-game accounts of each varsity sporting event, television shows or other weekly events.

The awards for the 2014-15 school year include: The Columbia Scholastic Press Association awarded The Feather Online a Gold Crown designation and a gold medalist in March 2015 judging. The Feather scored over 960 out of 1,000 points, earning all 3 All-Columbian Honors. The Crown award ceremony will be hosted at the 91st annual CSPA convention at Columbia University in March 2015. The National Scholastic Press Association awarded The Feather its 4th All-American honor in a row in November 2014 and all 5 Marks of Distinction and a score of over 4,100 out of 4,300 points in the annual fall critique.

Six staff members then attended the Columbia Scholastic Press Association's 89th annual journalism convention held at Columbia University in New York City, March 20–22, 2013. The Feather Online was named a Crown Finalist earlier in the school year and on March 22, the CSPA honored the online newspaper with its third Digital Gold Crown. The Feather Online has also earned two Digital Silver Crowns as well.

For the second time in campus history, the Columbia Scholastic Press Association at Columbia University in New York City honored The Feather Online their top award. The CSPA awarded The Feather Online a Gold Crown in March 2011 along with 8 other high school newspapers from across the United States, including one other from California. In March 2010 The Feather won its first Gold Crown and was honored with a Silver Crown in February 2009. In 2009, the Crown award was only presented to the top seven high school online publications, one of which being The Feather.

For the third time in campus history, The Feather Online was awarded an online Pacemaker in Portland, Oregon, from the National Scholastic Press Association, April 17, 2010. There were a total of 12 Pacemakers given but The Feather was the only California school to win an online Pacemaker this year out of the 26 finalists. The Fresno Bee honored The Feather by giving the high school newspaper a Thumbs up, in the April 24 editorial outlining The Feather's nomination in the Opinions section for both the 2010 Pacemaker and Gold Crown awards.

On April 19, 2008, The Feather Online was recognized as one of the best online high school newspapers in the United States by the National Scholastic Press Association in Anaheim, CA. This is the second time The Feather Online has won the prestigious Pacemaker award. The first time was in April 2006. The Fresno Bee printed an article, outlining The Feather's nomination in a Metro article for a Pacemaker award.

The online edition has received many additional awards, including winning the National Scholastic Press Association's 2006 Online Pacemaker. During the fall 2007 semester, Feather staff writers created 250 articles in an effort to become a daily publication of Fresno Christian High School. The Feather Online unveiled a new, updated version in late January 2007.

Feather authors' works have been featured in publications other than The Feather, including the pieces Piece "The Upside to Down Syndrome" in PBS NewsHour Extra: Student Voice.

Feather reporters were also recognized by a national online publication in the 2007 fall semester. While The Feather does not always participate in the National Edition, the staff had 35 articles selected by the National Edition online newspaper during 14 consecutive weeks of publication. As of mid December, 20 different Feather reporters were honored by this selection. The National Edition is a national high school publication sponsored by the American Society of Newspaper Editors. The National Edition began publication in September 2003 and publishes about 30 articles each week, drawing from over 665 high school online publications. In addition to providing daily news, The Feather began podcasting in the fall of 2007. Feather podcasts can also be found on iTunes. Many of the Feather staff have also begun blogging.

The print edition of The Feather has also received numerous awards, such as First Place by the International Quill & Scroll (2009, 2008, 2007, 2006, 2003, and 2000) and a Gold medal from Columbia Scholastic Press Association of New York City in 2009, 2008, 2006 (Silver medals 2007, 2006, 2005, 2003, 2002, 2000). The staff has also been honored by the National Scholastic Press Association. Most recently the NSPA gave The Feather a First Class rating with two marks of distinction in 2009. (The same award was given 2008, 2007, 2006, 2005, 2000). The Feather print edition also won the San Joaquin Valley Scholastic Press Association's Sweepstakes award on March 1, 2008. This is annually given to the grand champion of the day at California State University, Fresno, in the annual conference and contest. High school newspaper staffs from Lodi, CA, to Bakersfield, CA, regardless of school size, attend the competition.

=== Band ===
The high school has several divisions of the performing arts department, including jazz band, concert band, and marching band. The bands have appeared on the KMPH Fox 26 morning show, "Great Day". Programs begin as early as elementary grades, continuing through senior high. The band department also includes the color guard that marches with the marching band in parades and the winterguard that performs in separate competitions during the months of January, February, and March.

=== Choir ===
The choir program at Fresno Christian includes the concert choir, women's chorale, men's chorale, and ensemble, however some programs are not offered during the school year due to lack of enrollment in the subject. The choral groups received a total of five awards in the Heritage Music Festival, hosted in San Diego on March 19–22, 2009. Programs begin as early as elementary grades, continuing through senior high.

=== Drama ===
The drama classes perform multiple productions throughout the year, both before the student body during weekly chapels or as separate events.

== Clubs ==
=== CSF ===
The Fresno Christian High School chapter of the California Scholarship Federation consists of second-semester freshmen through seniors, attempting to improve the surrounding communities through community service. One such service started by CSF in the 2008–2009 school year, is free, peer tutoring. The California Junior Scholarship Federation is also offered to students in junior high grades, many of whom filter into the high school's CSF.

=== Destination ImagiNation ===
The Destination ImagiNation team is mostly independent from the rest of the school’s clubs and activities. The FCHS chapter of D.I. was started by seven juniors midway through the 2007–2008 school year. Although the club was young, the FCHS Destination ImagiNation team progressed to the state championships, and later nationals, winning multiple awards and recognition along the way. FCS did not field a team for the 2010-2012 school years.

=== Book & Walking Buddies ===
Fresno Christian has partnered with Pinedale Elementary to offer unique opportunities for both elementary and high school-level students. In exchange for community service hours, which are required for each high school student every semester, high school students walk or read with younger students who may have challenges or special needs in such areas. Students leave the Peoples Church campus during chapels on Thursday, returning in time for the commencement of seventh period.

=== FCA ===
The Fellowship of Christian Athletes is a club hosted on campus during lunch to encourage athletes of any sport to further develop their relationship with Christ. Although the club has been offered in the past, it was not available during the 2008-2012 academic years.

== Sports ==
The following sports are offered as opportunities to students at Fresno Christian:

Fall

- Eight-man football
- Girls' Tennis
- Girls' Volleyball
- Boys' and girls' cross country

Winter

- Girls' Basketball
- Boys' Basketball
- Boys' Soccer
- Girls' Soccer

Spring

- Boys' Tennis
- Boys' Volleyball
- Golf
- Track & Field
- Girls' Softball
- Boys' Baseball

== Accreditation ==
Fresno Christian Schools is fully accredited by the Association of Christian Schools International (ACSI), and the Western Association of Schools and Colleges (WASC).
