= Rustigian Building =

Rusitigian Building
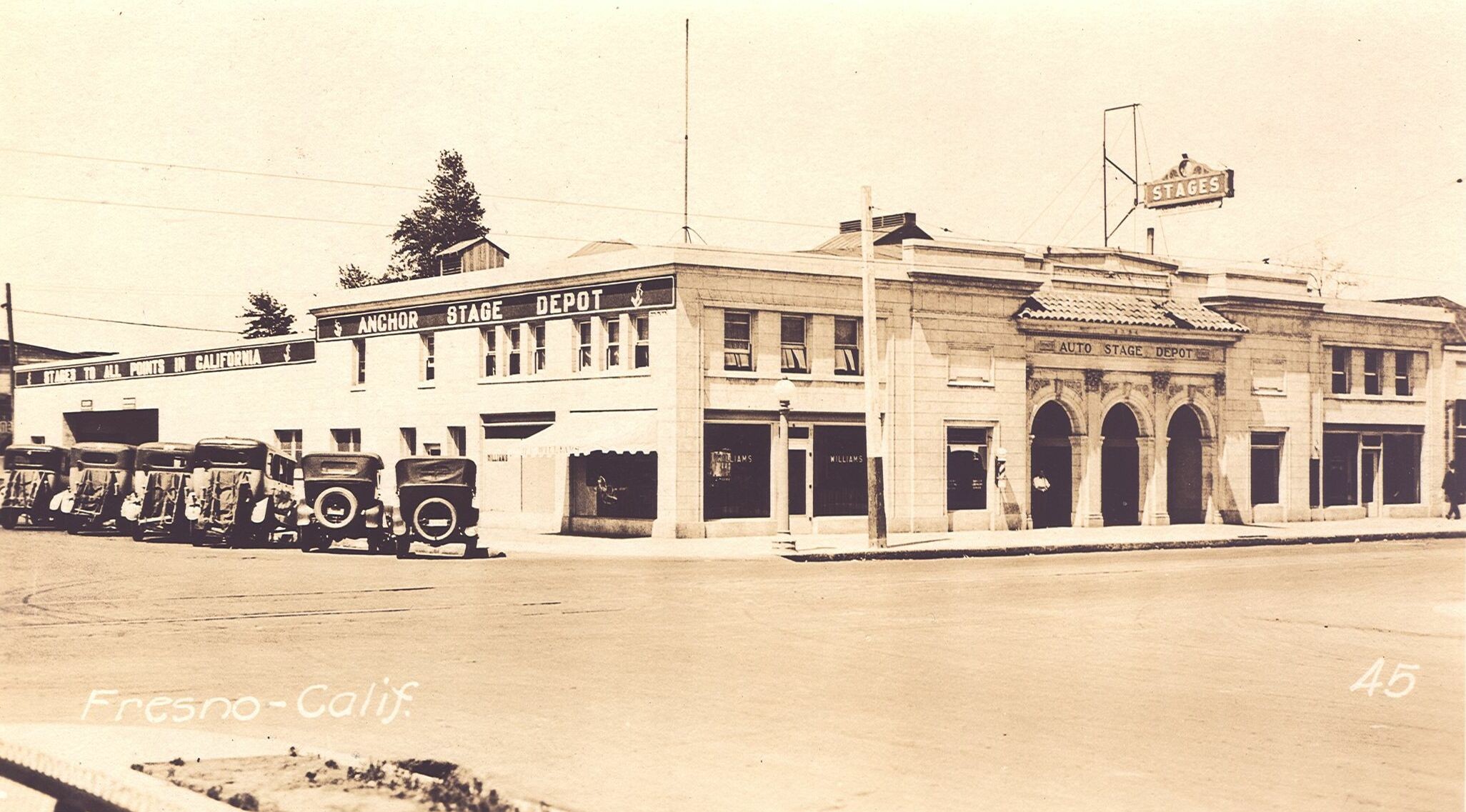
- Interactive map of the Rusitigian Building area

General information
- Location: 701-723 Fulton Street, Fresno, California, United States
- Coordinates: 36.731220°N 119.787430°W
- Elevation: 308 ft (94 m)
- Completed: 1920

Technical details
- Floor area: 22,000 sq ft (2,000 m^{2})

Design and construction
- Architects: Schwartz & Rayland

The Rusitigian Building, at Fulton and Mono Streets in Fresno, California, was built in 1920 in Classical Revival style architecture. Originally built as a bus depot, it was renovated and reopened 2019 for retail and restaurant tenants. It is listed as a historic place by Fresno's Local Register of Historic Resources.

== Location ==
The building is on the south end of the Fulton Mall, in downtown Fresno. The original address for the building was 715 J Street, however J Street was renamed to Fulton Street in honor of prominent local financier Fulton G. Berry after his death in 1910. The building now spans the addresses of 701-723 Fulton Street.

== History ==
The Rustigian Building is a one-and-a-half story Classical Revival building with scored stucco siding, a flat roof with a parapet and simple cornice. An arcade is located at the center of the front façade with “J.M. Rustigian” inscribed above. It was designed by the architecture firm of Schwartz & Rayland. Schwartz & Rayland were known for designing residential, commercial and school buildings throughout the Central Valley. They later expanded to the Bay Area and by the 1930s had established branch offices in Monterey and Salinas.

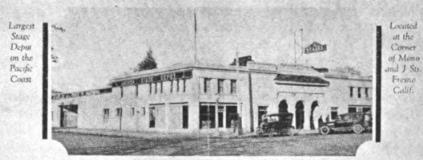
Rustigian Building in a 1922 Anchor Stage Lines advertisement

The original owner and namesake is James M. Rustigian. He was born in Harpoot, Armenia, in 1866 and was a Fresno-area rancher. The building was completed in 1920 and Anchor Stage Lines moved in as a tenant in October of that year. The Fresno depot served as a hub for rides to the surrounding orchards, vineyards, mountains and beaches.

James M. Rustigian died in 1922 and is buried at Ararat Cemetery in Fresno. After his death, the rise of the private automobile and the pressure of competitors, notably Greyhound, made the depot unsustainable. Anchor Stage Lines ceased operations there at beginning of 1931. Upon losing that tenant, Rustigian's widow, Eimas, defaulted on the mortgage and the building was sold to satisfy the debt.

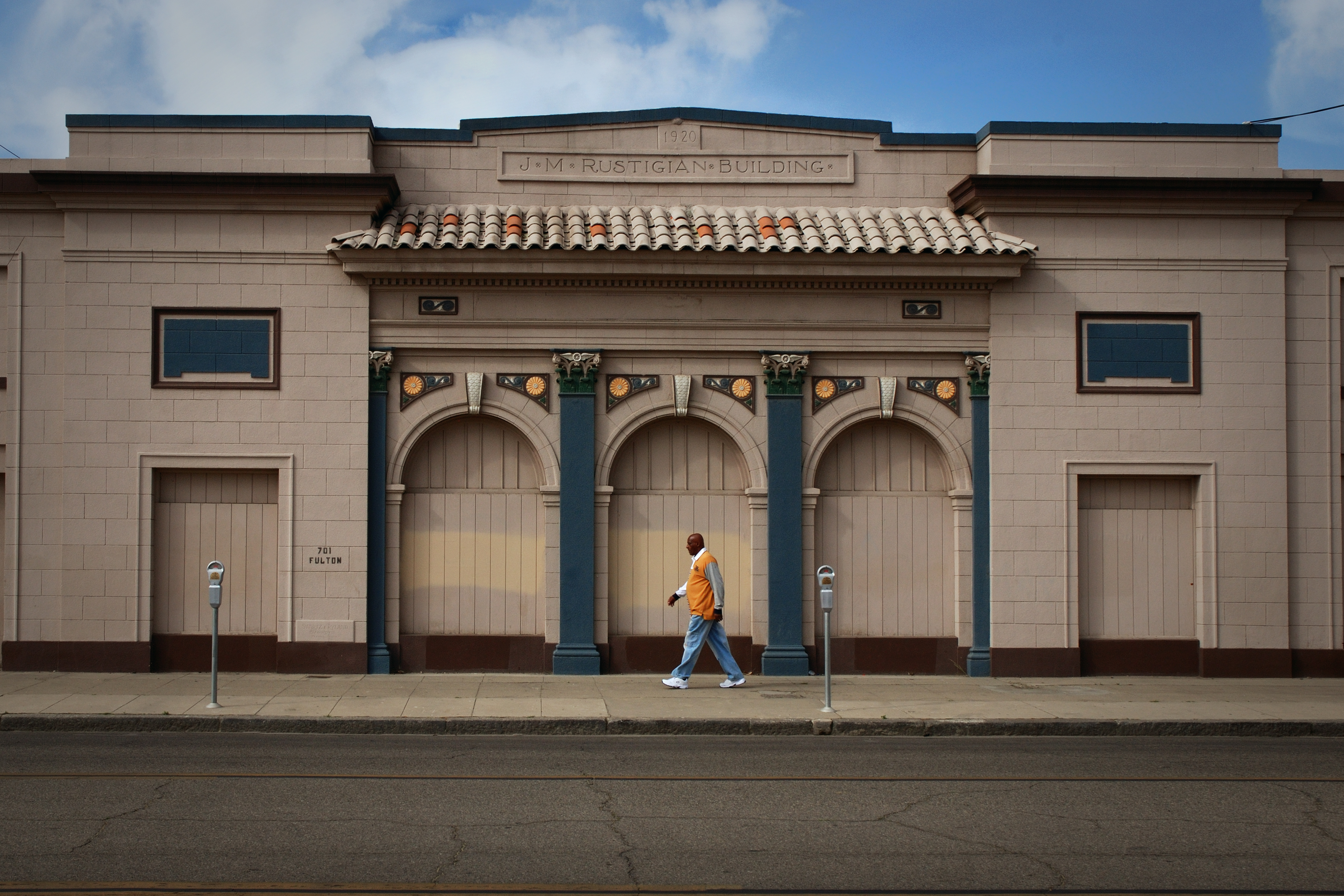
Rustigian Building in 2008, before it was renovated

In the 1930s, 40s, and 50s, the building was occupied by a wide variety of tenants, at one point even housing an apartment on the second floor. In 1960, Wilshire Paint opened as an anchor tenant in 701 Fulton, which it occupied until 1999.

The building sat vacant or as storage for many years before new owner Nora Monaco renovated the building in 2019. The tenants were selected based on whether they fit the up-and-coming Fresno "brewery district" community, of which this building is now a part of. A restaurant and two bars signed leases to operate in the renovated spaces. One bar included "Stage Depot" in their name, a nod to Anchor Stage's original use of the building.

The building's front façade was added to Fresno's Local Register of Historic Resources as H.P. #161.
