= River Park (Fresno, California) =

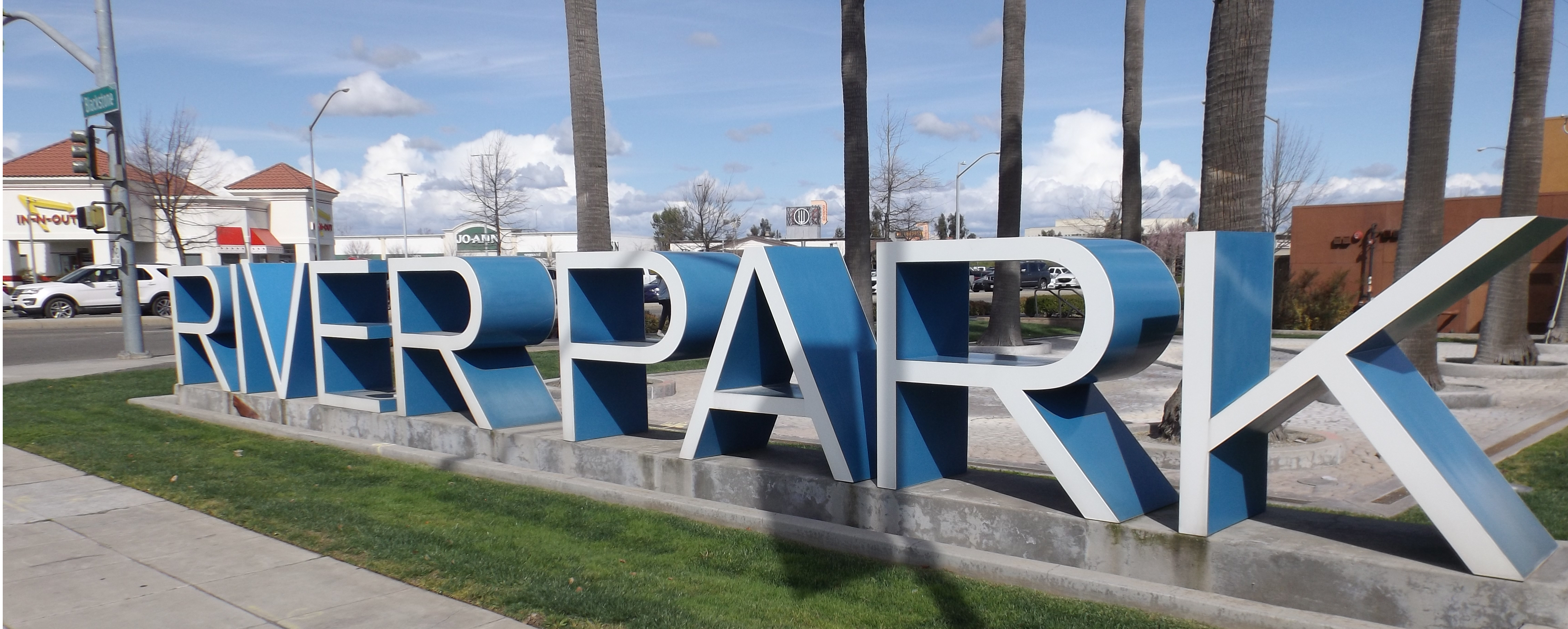
- River Park Shopping Center sign at North Blackstone Avenue
- Location: Fresno, California, United States
- Coordinates: 36.84723°N 119.78877°W
- Address: 70 El Camino
- Opened: 1996 (Marketplace); 1997 (Shops); 2004 (Kohl's); 2005 (Gottschalks-Macy's/REI)
- Manager: Lance-Kashian & Company
- Num. of stores: >75
- Num. of anchor tenants: 5
- Floors: 1 (2 in Macy’s, Regal, & REI)
- Parking: lot and garage
- Website: shopriverpark.com

River Park is an outdoor shopping center in Fresno, California on the east side of Blackstone Avenue. River Park is divided into three areas: The Marketplace, a traditional power center anchored by Target and Kohl's; an auxiliary shopping center with Chick-fil-A, Chipotle Mexican Grill and In-N-Out Burger, and The Shops at River Park, an outdoor lifestyle center anchored by Macy's, an Edwards Theatres cinema, and REI.

== History ==
River Park opened in several phases starting in 1996. Target and Best Buy anchored the initial phase of the project, which also included Old Navy, Marshalls, OfficeMax, Sports Authority, a JCPenney Home Store, CompUSA, and Linens 'n Things. Kohl's opened in 2004, followed by an expansion of the shopping center's lifestyle center The Shops at River Park in 2005. This added Gottschalks and REI as additional anchors, along with the existing Home Fabrics (which had replaced Zany Brainy), Borders, and Edwards Cinemas. The bankruptcies and subsequent liquidations of CompUSA, Gottschalks, Borders, Linens 'n Things, and Sports Authority left several large boxes in the center, which were filled with an Ashley Furniture (formerly CompUSA), Macy's (formerly Gottschalks), an H&M (formerly Borders), a Buy Buy Baby (formerly Linens 'n Things), and a Dick's Sporting Goods (formerly Sports Authority) respectively.

JCPenney Home Store closed in August 2017, with a smaller selection of home products being added at the JCPenney department store at nearby Fashion Fair Mall. The space is now replaced by Bob's Discount Furniture.

Romano's Macaroni Grill, an original restaurant to The Marketplace opening in 1998, permanently closed in April 2020 and was demolished the next year. In August 2022, Nike signed a lease to open a new 14,000 square foot retail store on the site of the former restaurant. In March 2024, construction was completed and is now open to the public.

Regal Cinemas fully remodeled the 22 screen Edwards Cinema during the COVID-19 closure period, which had remained unchanged since its opening in 1996. Edwards Cinemas Fresno 22 was rebranded and reopened as a 19 screen Regal Cinemas, known as Regal Fresno Riverpark 19. The standalone IMAX theater elsewhere in the center was permanently closed, and a new IMAX auditorium was constructed within the main theater. In 2024, the former IMAX space was reopened as a Kids Empire, a chain of indoor playgrounds.

The center has seen several store closures since the 2020 COVID-19 pandemic, including Haagen-Dazs, Blaze Pizza, Rubio's Coastal Grill, The Children's Place, Buy Buy Baby, Origins Cosmetics, Sur la Table, Destination Maternity, and Justice, while at the same time gaining Torrid, J. Crew Factory, Sunglass Hut, and several new local restaurants.

== Anchors and major stores ==
- Target - 126,929 sq ft (11,792.1 m^{2})
- Macy's - 100,000 sq ft (9,300 m^{2}), opened 2010 in former Gottschalks
- Regal Cinemas - 94,600 sq ft (8,790 m^{2}), formerly Edwards Cinemas
- Kohl's - 90,000 sq ft (8,400 m^{2})
- Bob's Discount Furniture - 50,885 sq ft (4,727.4 m^{2}), formerly JCPenney Home Store (1996–2017)
- Dick's Sporting Goods - 43,200 sq ft (4,010 m^{2}), opened 2017 in former Sports Authority
- Best Buy - 40,438 sq ft (3,756.8 m^{2})
- OfficeMax - 5,000 sq ft (460 m^{2})
- Marshalls - 30,500 sq ft (2,830 m^{2})
- REI - 25,526 sq ft (2,371.4 m^{2})
- H&M - 25,000 sq ft (2,300 m^{2}), opened 2014 in former Borders
- Burlington - 20,000 sq ft (1,900 m^{2}), Former Buy Buy Baby, opened 2011 in former Linens 'n Things
- Yard House - 6,000 sq ft (560 m^{2}), opened 2012 in former Zany Brainy
- Ashley Furniture - 5,000 sq ft (460 m^{2}), opened 2010 in former CompUSA

== See also ==
- Fashion Fair Mall
