= Clement Renzi =

American sculptor (1925–2009)

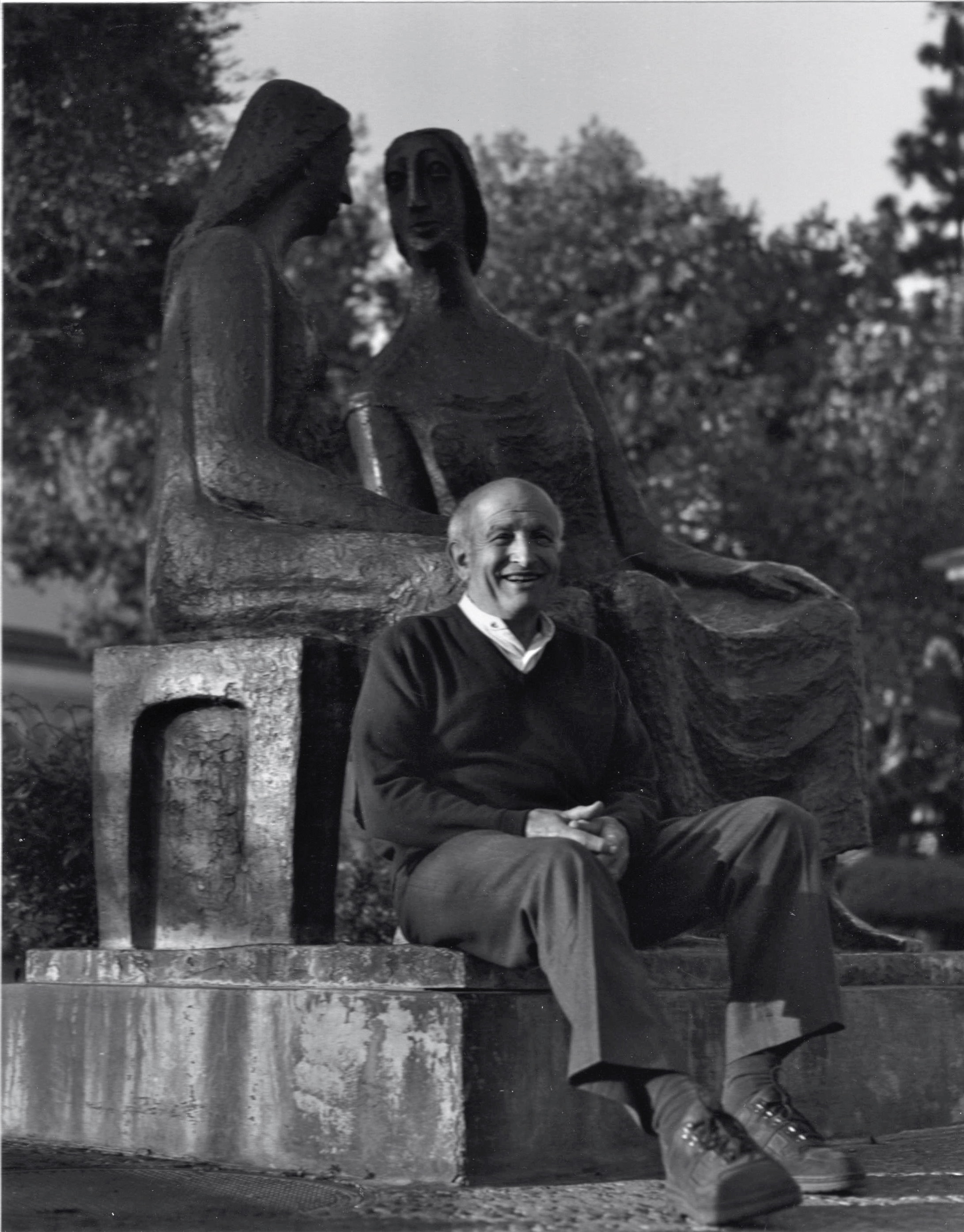
- Born: Clement Edward Joseph Peter Renzi; January 31, 1925; Farmersville, California, United States
- Died: December 1, 2009 (aged 84); Fresno, California
- Education: The Institute of Art Education, Berkeley, California, United States; The Academy of Applied Arts, Vienna, Austria; Art Students League of New York, NYC; Sculpture Center, New York City
- Known for: Sculpture, block print

Clement Renzi (born as Clement Edward Joseph Peter Renzi; 1925–2009) was an American sculptor whose figurative bronze and terra cotta works depict people, human relationships, animals, and birds. His work has been popular with collectors in California's Central Valley and is placed in more than 60 public venues, primarily in that region.

== Childhood and family ==
Clement Renzi was the third of seven children, born to parents Clemente Renzi and Luisa Guastaferro. The couple had been drawn to Central California's Tulare County because of its resemblance to the landscape of Clemente's native village of Dugenta, Italy. After the family lost their prune orchard in the stock market crash of 1929, they moved to Farmersville, California, where Clemente worked managing a ranch.

== Beginnings as a sculptor ==
Clement Renzi's first drawing, at about age seven, depicted a cow on his family's farm. He resolved to become a sculptor during a family trip to San Francisco's Palace of the Legion of Honor. During that visit, he encountered the sculptures of Auguste Rodin and had difficulty keeping his hands off them, despite admonitions of a security guard.

At the end of World War II, while serving as a naval officer in Hawaii, Renzi worked in a lumberyard, where he began to experiment with woodcarving.

Later, while at U.C. Berkeley studying business administration through the G.I. Bill, he took art classes with Jacques Schnier and Richard O'Hanlon. After he had graduated in 1947 and was working as an accountant for Standard Oil, a fellow student urged him to attend a lecture by art educator Henry Schaefer-Simmern. The lecture was an epiphany for Renzi, who said, "It was just like I had walked into daylight from darkness."

"It was that kind of an experience and it had a profound effect on me. Here was Henry saying that art cannot be imposed upon you. You have to make your own judgments. I had thought that the teacher alone played that part and made all the judgments, but Henry said, 'No, you are perfectly free to do it your own way. The most important thing is that you do what you can do, in the way that you feel it, and the way you can express it. It has perfect validity as a work of art when you do it your own way.' That enormous sense of freedom gave me an exciting license to advance along my own path."

At age 27, Renzi enrolled as a charter member of Schaefer-Simmern's Institute of Art Education and continued his studies there for five years. He later said that Schaefer-Simmern provided a “course to guide my whole life work.”

Although Renzi experimented with drawing, painted needlework, mosaic, and block printing, Schaefer-Simmern observed that his work all seemed to resemble sculpture and encouraged him to focus on that medium.

In 1950, Renzi married Dorothy Ohannesian, a classically trained singer from Fresno, California. When Renzi complained to Dorothy that his accounting job at Standard Oil felt increasingly unsatisfying, she persuaded him to seek part-time jobs that would allow him to focus on his art.

In 1954–1955, Dorothy studied singing in Vienna through an Alfred Hertz Master's Fellowship from UC Berkeley. During this time, Clement studied at Vienna's Academy of Applied art, P. 16. with a special focus on block printing. The couple also studied in Paris.

== New York ==
Following their return to the United States, Clement completed his first major commission, The "Fourteen Stations of the Cross", for a Christian Brothers retreat center in St. Helena.

In 1957, he and Dorothy moved to New York City to accommodate Dorothy's recording contract with MGM records. Renzi studied anatomy at the Art Students League, and before long, he had secured a workspace at New York's Sculpture Center. Clement offered a large tapestry, Eat, Drink and Be Merry, for sale at the gallery at an audaciously high price, not fully wanting to part with it. When, to his surprise, the work was sold, Dorothy encouraged Clem to devote himself full-time to his sculpture. P. 16. With the Sculpture Center, he participated in several New York exhibits, was featured in shows traveling nationwide, and held a one-man exhibit in 1960.

In a brochure for the 1960 exhibit, Sculpture Center's founder, Dorothea Henrietta Denslow commented, “These little people with their long noses, big eyes, and chubby figures live in a far-away land. They are friendly, warm and at peace with themselves, enjoying their unimportant happy moments. We do not know them or their country, but Renzi does, as you can readily see by this show. Through his sculpture, we watch them as they work and play in close harmony, concerned only with the miracles of their simple world.”

== Fresno, California ==
In 1963 the couple moved to Dorothy's hometown of Fresno, to raise their daughter in a quieter environment. Although he had intended to continue shipping his work to the Sculpture Center in New York, his work quickly proved appealing to Fresno collectors. Within a year, Renzi had secured a commission for a large bronze, The Visit, for the City's new outdoor mall.

Renzi taught in the art department at Fresno State College for three years, but left when it seemed to be taking too much attention from his work. Renzi had built a studio in his backyard in Fresno's Fig Garden neighborhood, and travelled periodically to cast his larger bronze works through the lost wax process in Italy and Spain. As costs rose in Europe, he turned to foundries in Mexico City and California. His terra cotta works, made from locally derived clay, were often cast in a kiln on the premises of his home. Most of the completed works were unique or cast in editions of two or three.

Renzi continued to receive almost uninterrupted commissions for large bronzes for area hospitals, banks, churches, schools, colleges, the Fresno library, entertainment centers, civic buildings, parks, malls and businesses. In addition, he produced hundreds of smaller works, which he sold from his home and through local galleries. He also continued to offer works through the Lillian Kornbluth gallery in Fairlawn, New Jersey; the William Beattie Gallery in Chicago, and Sculpture Center in New York City.

== Controversy about Brotherhood of Man ==
In 1969, one of Renzi's sculptures, Brotherhood of Man, drew attention to his work when a group unsuccessfully contested its placement at the Fresno County Courthouse, asserting that its subject matter violated the separation of church and state.

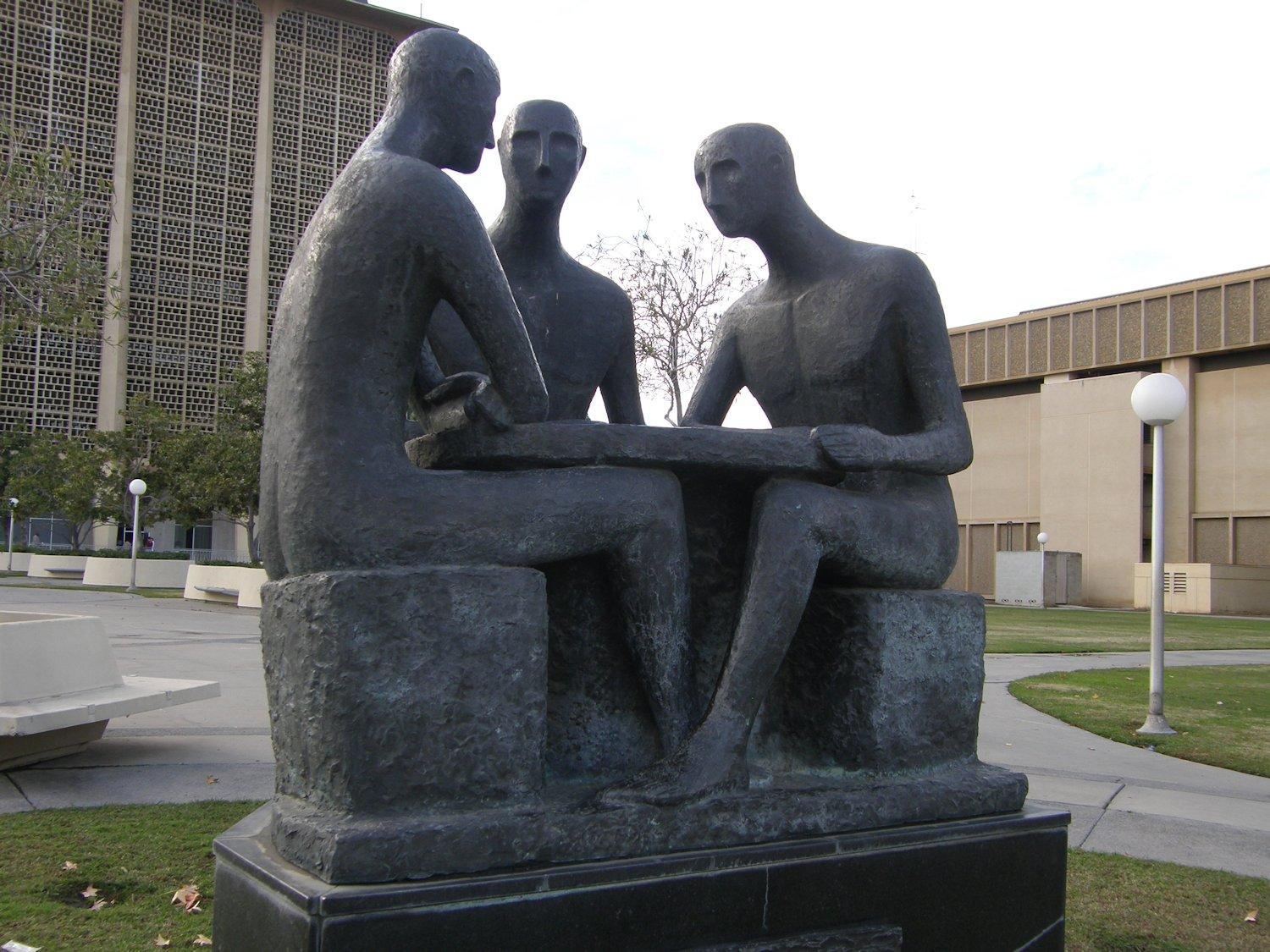
The Brotherhood of Man (1969), Courthouse Park, Fresno, California.

== Style ==
Renzi's style sometimes resembles the work of Ernst Barlach, reflecting the influence of German expressionism in his training, and has also been compared to folk art. However, Renzi did not identify with any particular style or movement and considered the character of his work to have evolved through an introspective, self-directed process of trial and error. "I try to find something completely my own within me and try to enlarge on the concepts that come out of inner search," he said in a 1974 interview. "I search within and get ideas from within."

Renzi's early work often featured tall, slender forms. In the early 60's his sculptures could be characterized as “fat and flat”. Later works assumed a more rounded, friendly aspect (P 13) with cherubic children making a frequent appearance, although he also experimented with other kinds of forms, such as a series of bird-like boats with abstract human passengers, and with weightier themes, such as heroic figures from the Old Testament.

== Legacy ==
Although Renzi's art was well received by critics and collectors during his New York years, and he continued to market smaller pieces through galleries in the Chicago and the New York area, the demand for his work was so strong in Fresno and its surrounding communities that as time went on, he gave little attention to promoting his work in major urban centers. He remains best known in California's Central Valley.

== Exhibitions ==
=== One-man exhibitions ===
- The Sculpture Center, New York New York. 1960 and 1973
- St. Mary's College, Moraga, California
- University of Virginia Gallery, Charlottesville, Virginia
- Fresno Art Center (Clement Renzi: The Fresno Years, 1989. Renzi: Art, Life, Legacy, 2012)
- Kings Gallery, Hanford, California
- L'Entrepreneur Art Gallery, Fresno, California. December 1965 – January 1966. Bronze and Terra Cotta sculptures.
- William Rogers Gallery, Fresno, California. Renzi: A showing of bronze and terra cotta sculptures completed during 1977, 1977.
- Couvier Gallery, Fresno, California

=== Other shows ===
- San Francisco Museum of Art
- Notre Dame University (permanent collection)
- University of Virginia Museum (permanent collection), Charlottesville, Virginia
- St. Mary's College Museum, Moraga, California
- Pennsylvania Academy of Fine Arts
- Kornbluth Gallery, Fairlawn, New Jersey
- Benjamin-Beattie Gallery, Chicago, Illinois
- Wilson Gallery, Fresno, California
- Plum's Gallery, Fresno, California

== Public works by Clement Renzi ==
- 1958 The Fourteen Stations of the Cross. Carmelite House of Prayer, Oakdale, California (Relocated from Christian Brothers Retreat Center in Hellendale, California)
- 1962 Stations of the Cross. Bronze. Location unknown.
- 1964 The Visit. Fulton Mall, Fresno, California
- 1964 The Reader. Woodrow Wilson High School, Hanford, California
- 1966–1967 "Walking Madonna and Christ Child." Sacred Heart Cathedral Chapel Sacred Heart Chapel, Ellis St., San Francisco, CA
- 1967 The Musicians II Chase Bank, Mooney Blvd at Whitesdale, Visalia, California
- 1967 Peasant Dancers. Chase Bank, 7777 Girard (at Silverado), La Jolla, California
- 1967 The New Book. Mariposa Library, Fresno, California
- 1967 Fish (Mosaic). Saint Mary's College of California, Moraga, California
- 1968 The Acrobats. Fresno City College, Gym, Fresno, California
- 1968 Brotherhood of Man. Fresno County Courthouse, Fresno, California
- 1968 Mother and Child (Madonna and Child). Saint Mary's College of California, St. Albert Hall Library, 2nd floor balcony, Moraga, California
- 1970 Christ the Healer. Cast in Bergamo, Italy. Saint Agnes Medical Center, Fresno, California
- 1971 The Family. Bigby Villa, 1329 E. Rev. Chester Riggins Ave, Fresno, California
- 1971 The Three Graces. California State University, East side of Music building, Fresno. Fresno, California
- 1971 Water Birds (Cranes). Shaw and Milbrook Ave., Fresno, California
- 1971 Trusting Hands (Mother and Child). San Joaquin Memorial High SchoolTulare County Historical Museum, Tulare, California
- 1972 Boy in the Fountain (A Summer Day). Valley Children's Hospital, Madera, California
- 1972 The Waifs. Chase Bank, Corner of "O" St and Jensen Ave, Sanger, California*
- 1973 The Yokuts Man. Fulton Mall, Fresno, California
- 1973 Marsh Birds. McHenry Ave. at Loveland Lane, Modesto, California
- 1973 Sound the Trumpets. Visalia Convention Center, Visalia, California
- 1974 Boy with Birds. Fresno Chaffee Zoo Fresno, California
- 1974 Bambini.Valley Children's Hospital, Madera, California
- 1974 Christ the Healer. Saint Agnes Medical Center, Fresno, California
- 1975?* Duet. San Joaquin Delta College, Irving Goleman Learning Center, 5151 Pacific Avenue, Stockton, California
- 1975 St. Anthony. St. Anthony of Padua Church, Fresno, California
- 1991 The Three R's.
1. Fresno County Office of Education, Fresno, California
2. Fresno County Educational Employees Credit Union, Shaw/Valentine branch, Fresno, California
- 1977 Family Matters. Westamerica Bank, Shaw Ave. at Forkner Ave., Fresno, California
- 1978 The Young Readers. Edition of two.
1. Media Center, San Joaquin Memorial High School San Joaquin Memorial High School, Fresno, California
2. Hiebert Library, Fresno Pacific University, Fresno, California
- 1978 Caring. California Armenian Home for the Aged, Kings Canyon at Armstrong Ave, Fresno, California
- 1979 Common Bonds (Sharing).
1. F & M Bank, Dale at Veneman Rd., Modesto, California
2. Laguna Hills, California
- 1980? Acrobats. Valley Children's Hospital, Madera, California.
- 1980 A Day Out with Grandma. Olive & M. Street, Merced, California
- 1981 A Day in the Park. (terra cotta relief) 1930 E. Shields Ave., Fresno, California (threatened and possible damaged due to fire)
- 1982 Elephant Arch. Chaffee Zoo, Fresno, California
- 1982 Children at Play (Spirit of Youth). Edition of 2.
1. University Picadilly Hotel, Courtyard, Fresno, California
2. Panther Creek Shopping Center, Village Square entrance, Woodlands, Texas.
- 1982 The Reader. Offices of Grabe, Schapansky, Moss and Claypool, Fresno, California
- 1983 Young Corbett III (The Boxer). Selland Arena, Fresno, California
- 1983 Mother and Son (To the Sea, Into the Wind, Mother and Child Running). City Hall, 110 E. Cook at Broadway, Santa Maria, California
- 1983 Take My Hand. Fresno Art Museum, Fresno, California
- 1984 Family Celebration. Kings County Government Center, 319 E. Douty, Hanford, California
- 1985 Firstborn. Kaweah Delta Medical CenterKaweah Delta District Hospital, Visalia, California
- 1986 Sleeping Child. (terra cotta) Saint Agnes Medical Center, Department of Obstetrics and Gynecology, Fresno, California
- 1990 Monseigneur Dowling and the Children. Shrine of St. Therese, 1410 N. Wishon, Fresno, California.
- 1995 Memorial to Tommy. Chaffee Zoo Fresno, California
- 1996 Graduation Day (The Diploma). Tulare County Department of Education, Visalia, California
- 1986 St. Francis. Westminster Presbyterian Church, Thorne Ave at Santa Anna, Fresno, California
- 1997 The Engineer. Sumner Engineering, 887 N. Irwin, Hanford, California
- 1998 The Three R's. Kremen School of Education and Development, Fresno, California
- 2002 Quail. Quail Park Retirement Village, Visalia, California
- 2004 Children Dancing. Trolley Creek Park, 5110 E. Huntington Blvd., Fresno, California
- 2004 Storytime. Kings County Office of Education, Hanford, California
- 2005 Fig Garden Swim and Racquet Club Founders' Memorial Statue. Maroa Ave at Rialto Ave., Fresno, California
- 2005 Boy Chasing Birds. U.S. District Court Federal Courthouse. Mezzanine. Fresno, California
- 2006 Children Learning. Copper Hills Elementary School, Clovis, California
- 2007 Deborah, Judge of Israel. (created 1989) Appellate Court, 2424 Ventura, Fresno, California
- 2009 Commencement. Merced County Department of Education, 13th St. at "N" St., Merced, California (Completed after the artist's death)

== Awards ==
- The Architectural League of New York 1961 Award for Sculpture.
- Audubon Society of New York 1961 Sculpture Selection
- The Silvermine Guild, Silvermine, Connecticut1962 Stone Carving Award
- Pennsylvania Academy of the Fine Arts, Philadelphia, Pennsylvania 1964 Purchase Award
- Horizon Award, Fresno Arts Council

== Bibliography ==
- Fresno City College RAM, 1976–77. The Renzi Style: Sculpting the Spirit. By Darlene McAfee. Photos by G. Kim Vargas. pp 12–19
- Davenport, William. W.; The Editors of Sunset Magazine. Art Treasures of the West. Menlo Park, Ca: Lane Magazine & Book, 1966.
- His figure and his ground: An art educational biography of Henry Schaefer-Simmern. (Volumes I and II) Berta, Raymond C., Ph.D. Stanford University, 1994 (UMI 300 N. Zeeb Rd. Ann Arbor, MI48106)
