= Ani-Jam =

Annual anime convention (2003–2014)

Coordinates: 36°44′1.14″N 119°47′0.49″W

- Status: Defunct
- Genre: Anime, Manga, Japanese culture
- Venue: Fresno Convention Center
- Location: Fresno, California
- Country: United States
- Inaugurated: 2003
- Most recent: 2014
- Attendance: 1,600+
- Organizer: Ani-Jam LLC
- Website: http://www.ani-jam.com/

Ani-Jam was an annual two-day anime convention held during August at the Fresno Convention Center in Fresno, California.

== Programming ==
The convention offered anime screenings, a cosplay masquerade, live music, table top games, vendors, video game tournaments, and workshops.

== History ==
The first event in 2003 lasted for six hours and attracted 500 attendees. The convention moved to the Fresno Convention Center in 2012. Ani-Jam celebrated its 10th anniversary in 2013. The convention held a day zero (Friday) event before the start of the 2014 convention where pre-registered attendees could attend a formal ball.

=== Event history ===
Dates	Location	Attend.	Guests
March 28, 2003	Ramada Fresno North; Fresno, California	500+	Edward Luena.
August 19–20, 2006	Fresno Fairgrounds; Fresno, California		Agent 760, Akai SKY, Johnny Yong Bosch, Eyeshine, Trish Ledoux, Fred Perry, Quarter-Circle Jab, Random Ninjas, Kristine Sa, Stephanie Yanez, and Toshifumi Yoshida.
August 18–19, 2007	Radisson Hotel & Conference Center; Fresno, California		Adella, Johnny Yong Bosch, Eyeshine, Melissa Hudson, Lord Katsuhiko Jinnai, Trish Ledoux, Kenyth Mogan, Fred Perry, Quarter-Circle Jab, Kristine Sa, Amanda Tomasch, and Toshifumi Yoshida.
August 2–3, 2008	Radisson Hotel & Conference Center; Fresno, California		Akai SKY, Robert Axelrod, Leah Clark, Justin Cook, Che Gilson, Lord Katsuhiko Jinnai, LYV, Makenai, Vic Mignogna, Fred Perry, Quarter-Circle Jab, Kristine Sa, and Stephanie Yanez.
August 20–21, 2011	Radisson Hotel & Conference Center; Fresno, California		Akai SKY, Greg Ayres, Lord Katsuhiko Jinnai, La Carmina, Robert McCollum, Vic Mignogna, Hannah Minx, Sebastiano Serafini, and Team LoveHate.
August 18–19, 2012	Fresno Convention Center; Fresno, California		Greg Ayres, Eric Caldero, Lord Katsuhiko Jinnai, Kairu, Brittney Karbowski, Kazha, Mari Watanabe, and Stephanie Yanez.
August 17–18, 2013 "10th anniversary"	Fresno Convention Center; Fresno, California	1,600+	Greg Ayres, Richie Branson, Lord Katsuhiko Jinnai, Cynthia Martinez, Chris Patton, Aimee Major Steinberger, Mari Watanabe, Robert Axelrod, Brittney Karbowski, and Valkyrie Kiss.
August 16–17, 2014	Fresno Convention Center; Fresno, California		Akai SKY, Greg Ayres, Jessica Calvello, Chris Cason, Samantha Inoue-Harte, Raj Ramayya, Chii Sakurabi, Jad B. Saxton, Steam Powered Giraffe, and David Vincent.

== Ani-Vent ==
Ani-Vent was a one-day convention held in 2010 with the goal of expanding into different events.

=== Event history ===
Dates	Location	Atten.	Guests
July 17, 2010	Fresno Fairgrounds, Chance Avenue Entrance; Fresno, California		

== Gallery ==
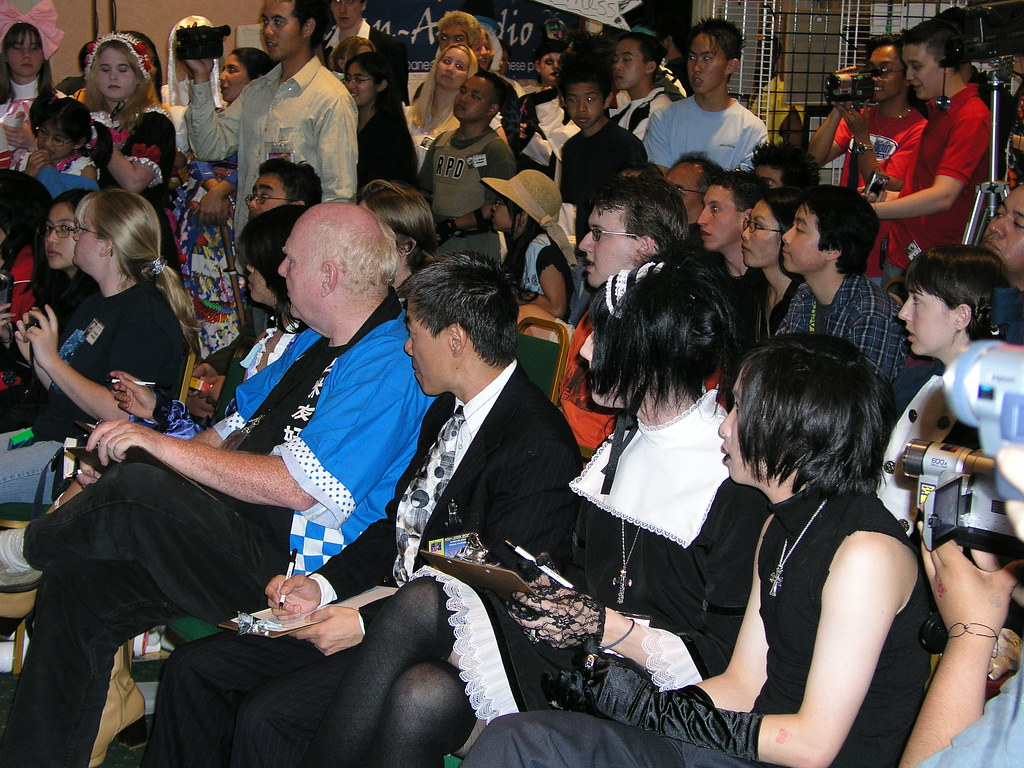
Attendees at the first Ani-Jam event held in Fresno, California in April 2003.

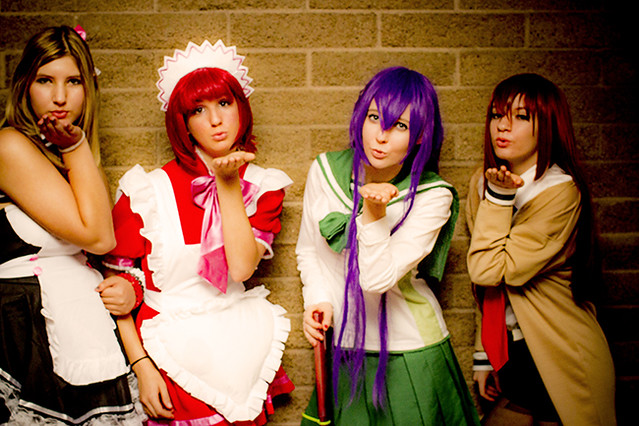
Cosplayers at Ani-Jam 2012 in Fresno, California.
