= Peoples Church =

Megachurch in Fresno, California

Coordinates: 36.8412°N 119.7534°W

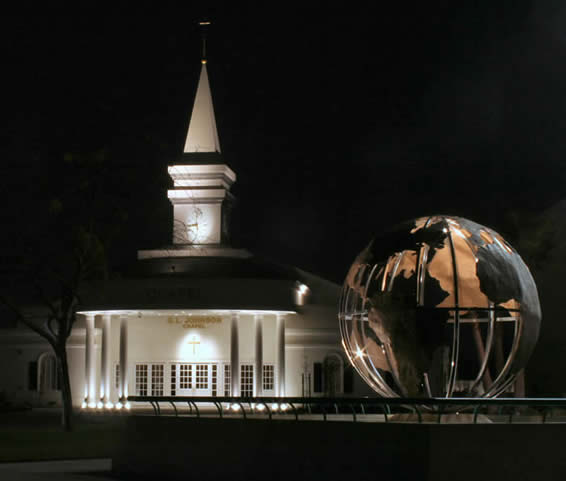
Peoples Church "G.L. Johnson Chapel"

Peoples Church is an evangelical non-denominational Christian megachurch in Fresno, California, US. The church is led by Pastor Dale Oquist. The church campus includes Fresno Christian High School, a private school attended by students in grades K-12.

== History ==
Peoples Church was founded in 1954 by several families from the Fresno area. The first pastor, Rev. Floyd Hawkins, led the church from January 1955 to August 1959. He was followed by Rev. Guy A. Davidson who led the church until April 1963. Under his leadership the congregation of about 200 converted old turkey houses into their first church building.

In 1964, Pastor G. L. Johnson replaced Davidson as head pastor. Under Johnson's leadership, the church grew into a 2000-seat sanctuary in 1977 at the church's current location at Cedar and Herndon avenues. Since moving to the Herndon campus, the church has added two Sunday school buildings, a youth building, a Worship Ministries wing and, most recently, the G.L. Johnson Chapel.

On Sunday, June 3, 2007, Johnson announced during the three morning services his intention to tender his resignation in spring 2008. He said the timeliness of his decision was based upon his 80th birthday and his 45th anniversary as leader of the Peoples Church congregation. Johnson retired in late February 2008, and the pastoral search committee began a nationwide search for a replacement.

In 2010, Rev. Dale Oquist, formerly of Olympia, Washington, was elected Lead Pastor at Peoples Church by an overwhelming majority of voting members.

In 2018, Peoples Church moved the 220 ton G.L. Johnson Chapel in order to make room for future expansion. The expansion plan is expected to cost $20 million and be completed by Easter 2021. The new construction will include a new 45,000 square foot building which will be dedicated for use by the children of the congregation, although the extended lobby will be available for community events.
