= Fashion Fair =

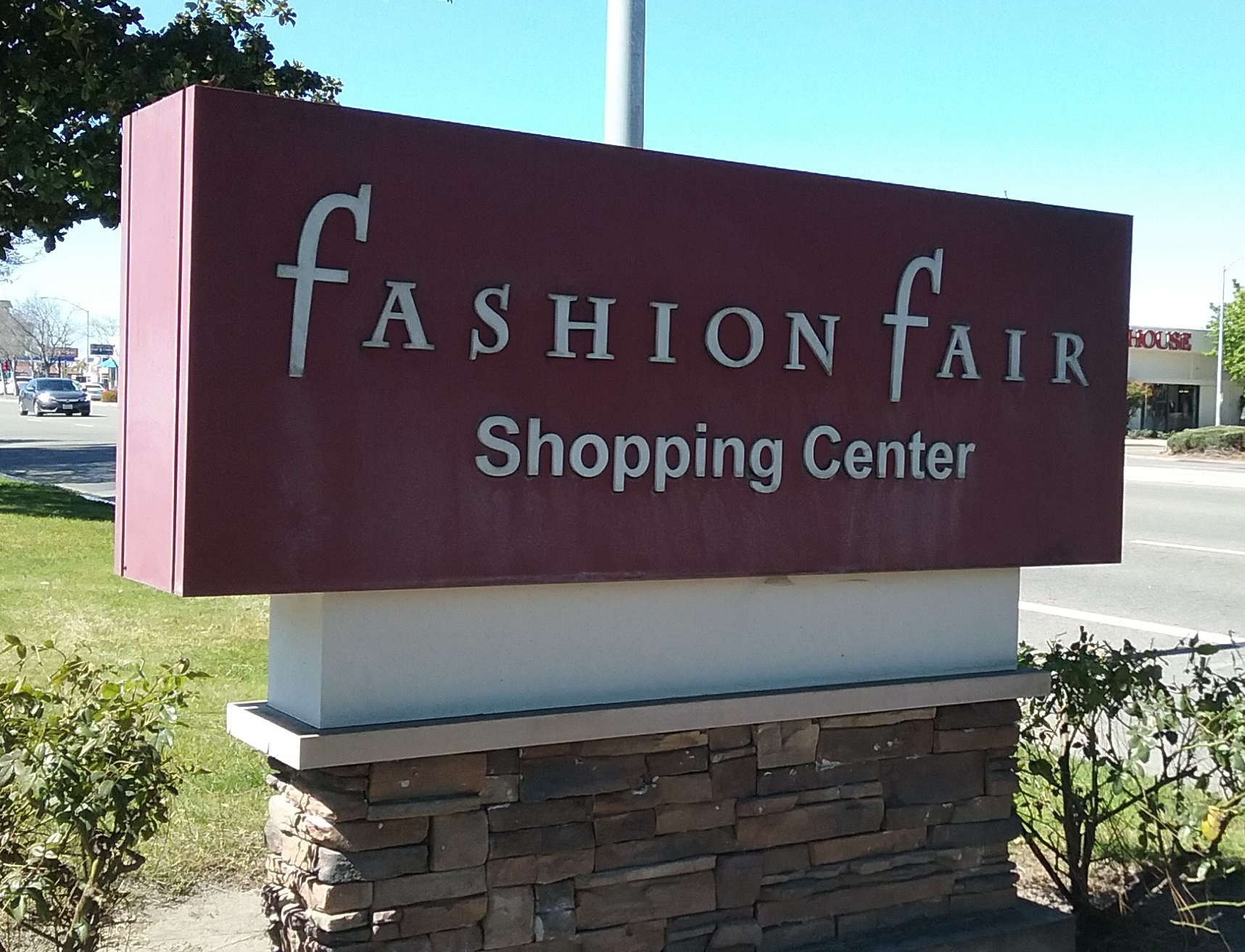
- Fashion Fair Mall sign
- Location: Fresno, California, United States
- Coordinates: 36.806°N 119.776°W
- Address: 645 E. Shaw Avenue
- Opened: 1970
- Developer: MacDonald Group
- Owner: Macerich
- Num. of stores: 130+
- Num. of anchor tenants: 4 (1 coming soon)
- Floor area: 963,000 sq ft (89,500 m^{2})
- Floors: 1 (2 in JCPenney, 3 in Forever 21 and Macy's)
- Parking: parking lot, valet
- Website: fashionfairmall.com

Fashion Fair is an enclosed regional shopping mall in Fresno, California, United States, anchored by two Macy's stores and JCPenney. There is a Dick’s House of Sport currently under development. Originally opened in 1970, Fashion Fair was expanded in 1983 (to accommodate Macy's and a new food court) and in 2005 (with the addition of an outdoor lifestyle wing). It competes with The Shops at River Park and Fig Garden Village, two outdoor shopping centers in the city of Fresno.

== History ==
The 500,000 sq ft (46,000 m^{2}) mall was built in 1970 by the MacDonald Group and was sold in 1987. The mall originally opened with Gottschalks, JCPenney, and Weinstock's; Macy's joined the roster in 1983, along with an expansion wing west of JCPenney that included a food court. As a result, the mall has the distinction where one has to enter JCPenney to access one end of the mall to the other while inside.

In 1996, Weinstock's parent company, Broadway Department Stores, merged with its competitor, Federated Department Stores. While most of Broadway's stores were converted to the Macy's nameplate, Weinstock's stores in Fresno and Modesto were traded to Gottschalks. This allowed Gottschalks to take over the larger Weinstock's buildings, while Macy's converted the original Gottschalks stores into separate Macy's Men's & Children's stores. Gottschalks filed for bankruptcy in 2009 and sold its lease to Forever 21. In 2019, Macy's relocated the children's department back to the original Macy's building to make room for the addition of Macy's Backstage.

After an extensive remodel, Forever 21 opened on April 1, 2011; this was the largest Forever 21 operating in the United States (at the time) at 164,052 square feet. Approximately one year after opening, the store downsized and took the third level out of service. In spring 2019, amid company restructuring, the store downsized again, leaving only the first floor in use. The second level partially reopened on August 30, 2019, however, was closed again by October 24, 2019, leaving only the first floor in use once again. Forever 21 filed for Chapter 11 bankruptcy on September 29, 2019. On October 1, 2019, this location was placed on the initial list of stores set to close by the end of the year. By October 31, 2019, the store was removed from the list of locations to close. However, the store began a liquidation sale on February 15, 2025, with an unknown closure date set.

In 2005, construction on a 94,000 square-foot expansion commenced. Dubbed The Village at Fashion Fair, the open-air wing features several upscale retailers.

The Village has experienced significant turnover since it opened, with major retailers Urban Outfitters, Anthropologie, and Z Gallerie (among others) exiting the property after less than 10 years in business. The former Urban Outfitters was replaced with an Ulta Beauty store in 2018, which was joined by Fresno's second H&M store later in the year. Charming Charlie, which originally replaced Z Gallerie, closed in 2019, and was replaced with a Five Below which opened September 27, 2019.

The mall added a forest-themed play area in 2008.

In 2022, the malls Foot Action, Kids Foot Locker, and Lady Foot Locker stores were all closed, replaced by a newly expanded Foot Locker store housing all departments in one location. Additionally, X Lanes Family Entertainment Center opened a 50,000 square foot location featuring bowling, an arcade, and a restaurant in the mall's basement level, which had not been accessible since the mall's 2003 renovation.

Barnes & Noble opened a small format location in the former Guess store in The Village.

Anchor stores Forever 21 began a store closing sale on February 15, 2025 and closed later in 2025.

In 2026, it was announced that Dick’s Sporting Goods was looking to open one of their large format Dick’s House of Sport concept stores at the former Forever 21 anchor space. The store was approved by the Fresno Historic Preservation Commission and is under development as of March 2026.

== Anchor stores ==
Anchor	Year opened	Square Feet	Notes
Macy's Women's, Children's, and Home	1983	176,410 sf	Opened in 1983 as anchor to mall expansion.
Macy's Men's & Backstage	1996	76,650 sf	Built 1970 as Gottschalks, became Macy's Men's & Children's in 1996 after Gottschalks relocated to former Weinstock's, Kids department relocated to women's store to make room for addition of Macy's Backstage in 2019
JCPenney	1970	153,769 sf	Original anchor
H&M	2018	22,000 sf	Junior anchor; formerly Forever 21 and Love Culture
X Lanes Family Entertainment Center	2022	50,000 sf	Opened in 2022 in previously inaccessible basement level of the mall
Ulta Beauty	2018	10,164 sf	Junior anchor; formerly Urban Outfitters

== Former anchors ==
- Weinstock's (Opened 1970, closed 1996 due to Broadway-Federated merger)
- Gottschalks (Opened 1970, moved to former Weinstock's in 1996, closed 2009 due to company liquidation)
- Love Culture (Opened 2012 in former Forever 21 space, closed 2018, replaced by H&M)
- Forever 21 (Opened 2011 in former Gottschalks space, noted as formerly the largest Forever 21 store in operation until its closure in 2025)

== See also ==
- Fulton Mall
- The Shops at River Park
