= Artists' Repertory Theatre =

Artists' Repertory Theatre (ART) is community theatre group based in Fresno, California. Founded in 2005, the group's maiden performance took place in 2006, with the critically acclaimed Love's Fire. In 2009, ART produced the Fresno premier of the Pulitzer Prize–winning Rabbit Hole, by David Lindsay-Abaire, and caused a local stir with the Fresno premier Richard O'Brien's The Rocky Horror Show.

According to the Fresno Bee, ART is one of few theatre groups in Fresno with an "established reputation for quality."

== Production history ==
Because many ART Board members are affiliated with the summer Woodward Shakespeare Festival, the ART performance season runs from fall to spring.

=== 2009 - 2010 season ===
Fall 2009: All in the Timing Director's Cut, including all seven All in the Timing plays previously performed by ART, and one new play, all by David Ives.

Rogue Festival 2010: Parallel Lives, by Kathy Najimy & Mo Gaffney.

=== 2008 - 2009 season ===
Fall 2008: The Rocky Horror Show, by Richard O'Brien.

Winter 2009: Rabbit Hole, by David Lindsay-Abaire.

Rogue Festival 2009: All in the Timing Too, three one-act plays by David Ives, including Mere Mortals, The Universal Language, and Sure Thing.

Spring 2009: The Fantasticks, music by Harvey Schmidt and lyrics by Tom Jones.

=== 2007 - 2008 season ===
Winter 2008: Vagina Monologues, by Eve Ensler.

Rogue Festival 2008: All in the Timing, four one-act plays by David Ives, including Words, Words, Words, The Philadelphia, Phillip Glass Buys a Loaf of Bread, and Variations on the Death of Trotsky.

Spring 2008: Glengarry Glen Ross, by David Mamet.

=== 2007 season ===
Winter 2007: The Tempest, by William Shakespeare.

Spring 2007: Arcadia, by Tom Stoppard.

=== 2006 season ===
Rogue Festival 2006: Love's Fire, ART's maiden performance, consisting of three one-act plays: 140, by Marsha Norman; Terminating, by Tony Kushner; and Bitter Sauce, by Eric Bogosian.

Spring 2006: One Flew Over the Cuckoo's Nest, adapted for the stage by Dale Wasserman, based on the novel by Ken Kesey.

== Reviews & external links ==
- Fresno Bee's review of Parallel Lives.
- Parallel Lives Rogue Festival page.
- The Fantasticks interview for the Fresno Bee.
- Fresno Bee's review of The Fantasticks.
- Fresno Bee's review of All in the Timing Too.
- Fresno Bee's review of Rabbit Hole
- Fresno Bee's review of The Rocky Horror Show.
- Glengarry Glen Ross interview for the Fresno Bee.
- All in the Timing reviews from Rogue 2008.
- Fresno Bee's review of All in the Timing.
- Fresno Bee's review of Vagina Monologues.
- Arcadia interview for the Fresno Bee.
- Fresno Bee's review of Arcadia.
- Fresno Bee's review of The Tempest.
- Fresno Bee's review of Love's Fire.
- Fresno Famous article on One Flew Over the Cuckoo's Nest.
- ART MySpace page
