= Manchester Center (Fresno, California) =

Shopping mall in Fresno, California

Manchester Center is a mixed-use shopping mall in Fresno, California. It is located at the intersection of North Blackstone Avenue and East Shields Avenue. Manchester Center has transitioned from a traditional enclosed shopping mall into a mixed-use development.

== History ==
Manchester Center
- Location: Fresno, California, United States
- Coordinates: 36.7801°N 119.7892°W
- Address: 1901 E. Shields Avenue
- Opened: October 1, 1955
- Closed: c. 2025 (as an enclosed mall; redeveloped as mixed-use)
- Developer: C. Arthur Berfield (Manchester Mortgage Co.)
- Owner: Omninet Capital
- Architect: Walter Wagner (1955); Bode & Bode Architects (1978 renovation)
- Num. of stores: ~50
- Num. of anchor tenants: 3 (former)
- Floor area: 1,023,000 sq ft (95,000 m^{2})
- Floors: 2
- Public transit: Fresno Area Express (FAX Manchester Transit Hub)
- Website: thenewmanchester.com

Manchester Center was built on 40 acres of land, 2.6 miles north of downtown Fresno. It is one of the first major shopping centers in the San Joaquin Valley. Mayfair market grocery became the first operational store on November 5, 1953. It formally opened its doors to the public on October 1, 1955, having nine operational stores.

Manchester Center was developed at Blackstone and Shields avenues. The property had previously been part of the Markarian Fig Garden and had at one point been considered as a site for Fresno State College before the college selected another location in 1949. C. A. Berfield, president of the Manchester Land Company, subsequently developed the shopping center. Architect Walter Wagner designed the project, with Harris Construction Company serving as the builder. Construction began in 1953 and the center formally opened in 1955. Manchester Center was originally a one-story, open-air pedestrian shopping center. The project cost approximately $15 million and, when completed, contained 83 stores and parking for about 6,500 vehicles.

Work began in 1978 to enclose the shopping center and construct a second level. The expansion and renovation were completed in 1980.

=== Decline and redevelopment ===
By 1995, Manchester Center was experiencing financial difficulties and had accumulated more than $1 million in debt. The property was sold in 1996. A $50 million redevelopment proposal announced the following year included a movie theater and a combined ice and roller skating facility, although the plan was not completed.

A carousel was added to Manchester Center in 1998 as part of a multi-year expansion that connected the Sears building with the rest of the shopping center. The carousel became a longstanding feature of the mall before being placed in storage during later redevelopment work.

Gottschalks closed its Manchester Center department store on June 27, 2009, as the chain liquidated its stores following bankruptcy.

In 2016, owner Omninet Capital began another redevelopment project. Plans included a redesigned entrance and facade, new signage, an outdoor event area and a two-story food marketplace. Several new restaurants subsequently opened at the property, although portions of the proposed redevelopment were not completed.

In October 2016, the Fresno Police Department opened a Central Policing District station at Manchester Center. Located on the mall's second floor, the approximately 10,000-square-foot facility was expected to accommodate about 80 officers.

By 2018, redevelopment plans called for the former Gottschalks building to be converted into a food marketplace containing 11 local eateries. The mall's second floor was planned primarily for office uses, while retail and dining remained concentrated on the first floor.

Sears, which had operated at Manchester Center since 1956, announced the closure of its store in November 2019. Portions of the former Sears space were later renovated for Ross Dress for Less and dd's Discounts, which opened in 2021.

Interior view of the upper-level corridor at Manchester Center, 2025.

In 2023, plans filed with the City of Fresno called for 610 residential units at Manchester Center while retaining approximately 112,000 square feet of retail space. The proposal also included about 11,500 square feet of office space and 44,000 square feet of storage. The first phase was planned to contain 221 studio and one-bedroom apartments.

In March 2023, the former Sears property was sold by Seritage Growth Properties to Ethan Conrad Properties for $10.7 million. The building, which is separately owned from the main Manchester Center property, had previously been subdivided to accommodate multiple retailers.

In 2024, plans were announced to convert much of the former mall's usable interior space into approximately 600 apartments while retaining more than 100,000 square feet of retail space. The redevelopment was proposed under the name One Fresno at Manchester Center.

By 2025, the City of Fresno had approved a permit for the first 221 apartments planned as part of the Manchester Center redevelopment, pending payment of development fees. The first phase of the project was expected to take approximately 18 to 20 months.

El Super opened a supermarket in the former Sears building in July 2025.
