= Pacific Southwest Building =

High-rise in Fresno, California

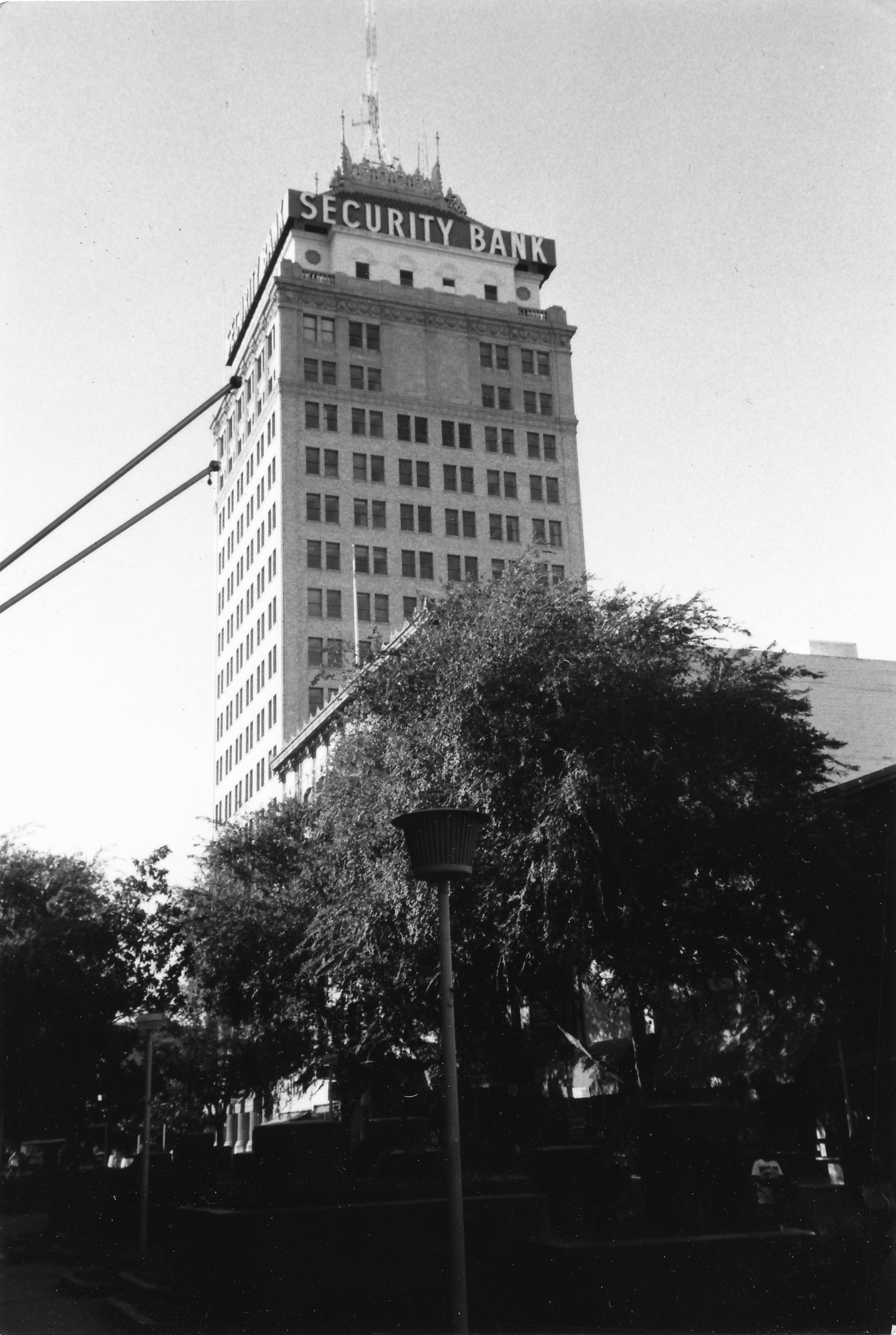
- Former names: Fresno Pacific Towers; Wells Fargo Bank; Security Bank Building
- Alternative names: 1060 Fulton

General information
- Type: Commercial offices Residential condominiums
- Architectural style: Neo-Classical
- Location: 1060 Fulton Street; Fresno, California
- Coordinates: 36.7348631°N 119.7906454°W
- Construction started: 1923; 103 years ago
- Completed: 1925; 101 years ago
- Cost: US$3 million
- Owner: Hrayr, Serko and Sevag Khatchadourian

Height
- Antenna spire: 96 m (315 ft)
- Roof: 67.36 m (221.0 ft)

Technical details
- Floor count: 15
- Lifts/elevators: 3

Design and construction
- Architects: R.F. Felchlin Company; Robert Richmond Architect

The Pacific Southwest Building (also known as the Security Bank Building) is a 15-story, 67 m (220 ft) high-rise completed in 1925 in downtown Fresno, California. The tower's antenna rises to 315 ft (96 m). Original construction took eighteen months and cost $1,200,000 for the headquarters for the Fidelity Branch of the Pacific-Southwest Trust and Savings Bank. Originally, a beacon on top of the tower served as a frost warning to farmers within a 30-mile radius. It is the tallest building in Fresno.

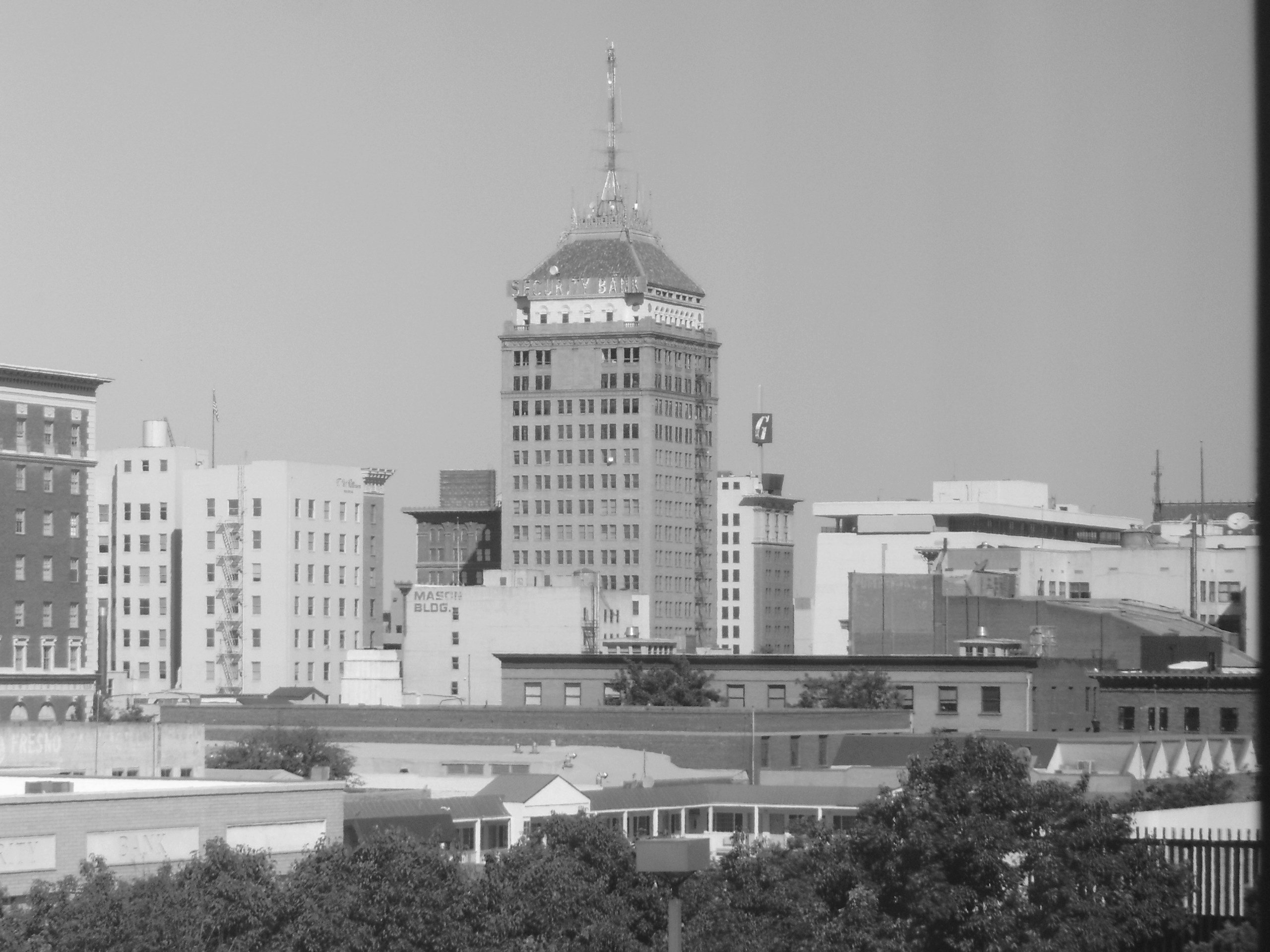
The Pacific Southwest Building in the Fresno skyline

Fresno banker William Sutherland was instrumental in the planning and construction of the building. In 1925, the Pacific Southwest Trust and Savings Bank, with Sutherland as its president, moved its offices there.

The building is currently owned by Beverly Hills-based developers, Sevak, Hrayr and Serko Khatchadourian. The top floors of the building have been converted into apartments and have in recent years increased occupancy in the building from 5% to 95%.
