= San Joaquin Light and Power Corporation Building =

High-rise in Fresno, California

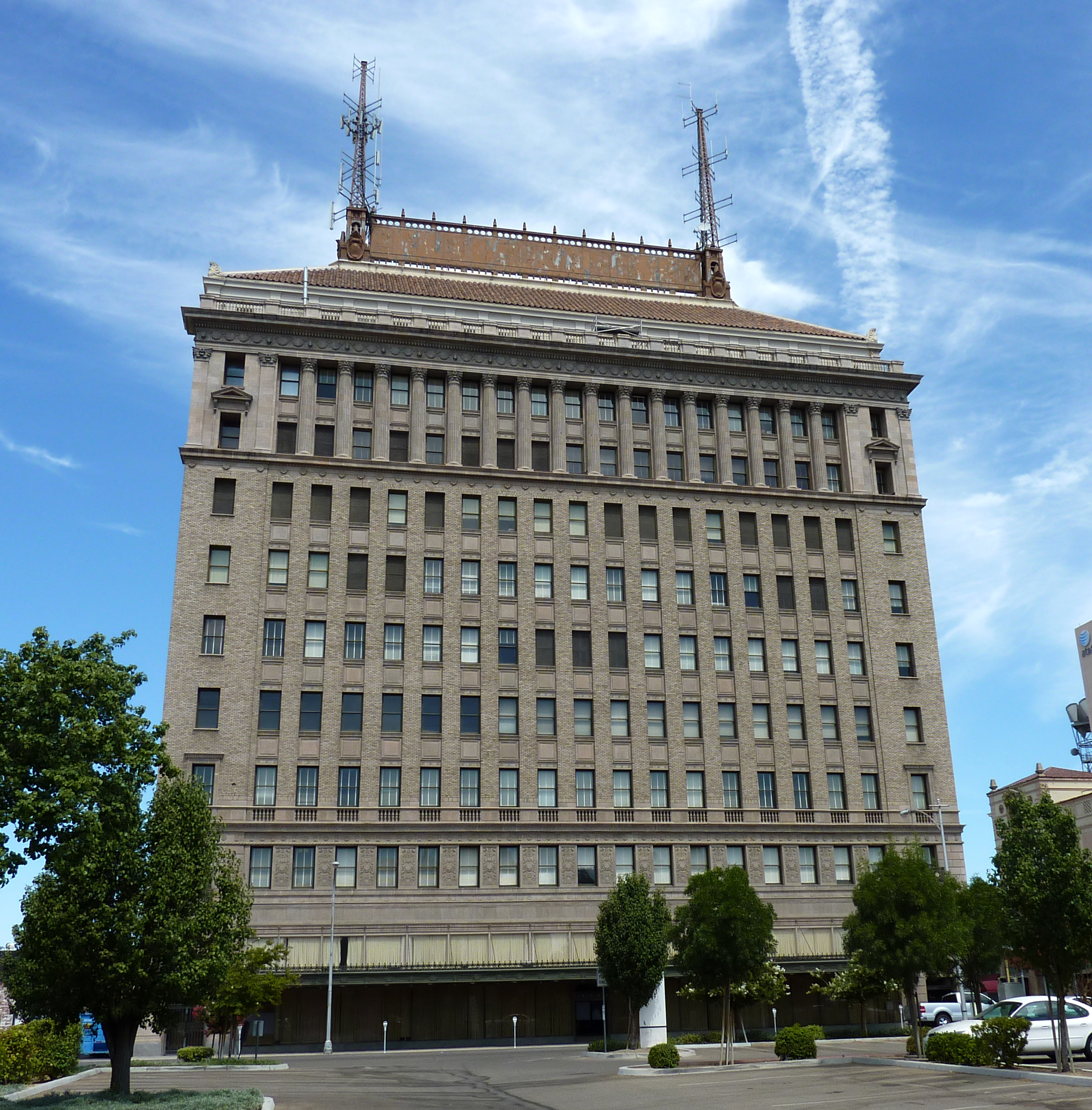

- Location within California
- Former names: Trade Center; San Joaquin Light & Power; Pacific Gas and Electric; PG&E Building

General information
- Type: Commercial offices
- Architectural style: Beaux-Arts
- Location: 1401 Fulton Street; Fresno, California
- Coordinates: 36.7369°N 119.7947°W
- Completed: 1923

Height
- Roof: 52.8 m (173 ft)

Technical details
- Floor count: 11
- Lifts/elevators: 3

Design and construction
- Architects: Raymond R. Shaw; R.F. Felchlin Company
- San Joaquin Light and Power Corporation Building
- U.S. National Register of Historic Places
- Built: 1924
- Architect: Richard Felchlin
- Architectural style: Renaissance
- NRHP reference No.: 05001497
- Added to NRHP: January 3, 2006

San Joaquin Light and Power Corporation Building is an historic 11-story, 52.8 m (173 ft) high-rise in downtown Fresno, California. The building was completed in 1923 for the San Joaquin Light and Power Corporation, which later became the Pacific Gas and Electric Company, by chief designer Raymond R. Shaw of the R.F. Felchlin Company. The building is the fourth tallest in the city.
