= Sunnyside High School (Fresno) =

Public school in California, U.S.

Location
- 1019 S. Peach Avenue; Fresno, California 93727; 36.73273°N 119.71687°W

Information
- Type: Public
- Motto: Be Proud of who you are and what you represent
- Established: 1999; 27 years ago
- CEEB code: 051045
- NCES School ID: 061455007963
- Principal: Michele Anderson
- Teaching staff: 133.24 (FTE)
- Grades: 9-12
- Student to teacher ratio: 20.63
- Campus: Suburban
- Colors: Dark Blue and Gold
- Athletics conference: North Yosemite League
- Mascot: Wildcat
- Feeder schools: Terronez Middle School; Kings Canyon Middle School
- Website: sunnyside.fresnounified.org

Sunnyside High School is a high school in Fresno, California, USA. It is a part of the Fresno Unified School District.

== History ==
In November 1989, Fresno area voters passed Measure A which changed the Fresno Unified School District's election process. The ballot measure had two parts, expanding the district governing board from five to seven members and requiring trustees to live in the areas they represent. At that time, three of the five trustees lived in the Bullard High School area, leading to claims of under-representation of other areas, such as Sunnyside, located in southeast Fresno. Under Measure A, the Sunnyside area received its own trustee seat, despite not having a dedicated high school yet. The other six trustee seats were slated to represent Bullard High, Edison High, Fresno High, Hoover High, McLane High, and Roosevelt High.

Once campaigning for the new Sunnyside trustee seat began, many candidates stressed the need for building a new high school in the Sunnyside area to deal with rapid growth. Former Fresno Unified trustee Nancy Richardson won the Sunnyside seat in a June 1990 election and began serving her four-year term. To get the funding for constructing new facilities, Fresno Unified put a bond measure before voters in June 1995. The measure passed and the Sunnyside High School project received $48 million in funding. Overcrowding at existing Fresno schools was a very large concern, and a new campus had a chance to alleviate that issue.

Over 300 people attended a groundbreaking ceremony in August 1997, starting construction of the Sunnyside campus. Construction took two years, and the school opened to students on August 23, 1999. It was Fresno Unified's first new high school since Hoover opened in 1963. John Marinovich was the school's first principal.

Grades were phased in, starting with only 9th grade and 10th grade in the first year of operation. 11th grade was added the following year, then finally 12th grade, with the class of 2001 becoming the first graduating class in school history.

Marinovich served as school principal until 2004, when he moved to an administration role inside Fresno Unified. A teacher at Sunnyside, Tim Liles, was promoted to the principal position in 2012 and became a beloved figure. Liles died from brain cancer in 2020, and Michele Anderson took over as school principal.

== Students and faculty ==
As of the 2020–2021 school year, Sunnyside's enrollment was 2,948. In that year, the student population was 69% Hispanic, 20% Asian, 5% African American, and 3% white. Sunnyside's faculty had 111 full-time teachers.

The schools that feed into Sunnyside include Ayer, Aynesworth, Bakman, Burroughs, Easterby, Greenberg, Olmos, and Storey Elementary Schools. The middle schools that feed into Sunnyside are Terronez Middle School and Kings Canyon Middle School.

== Academics ==
Sunnyside was described as "one of the top feeders of students to Fresno State," by former university chancellor Joseph I. Castro.

=== Doctors Academy ===
Sunnyside High is home to the Doctor's Academy, a four-year path of course work and hand-on learning to prepare them for health science and health profession careers. A focus of the academy is to increase the number of minority and disadvantaged students who graduate from high school and college, and pursue careers in health and medicine. It was founded by Dr. Katherine Flores, a Fresno area family physician, who secured partnerships with local hospitals and clinics, as well as the Fresno County Office of Education. Approximately 140 students are enrolled in the academy and the program has close to a 100% college acceptance rate.

=== Video Production Academy ===
In the Video production Academy, nearly 100 students learn digital and social media skills and acquire work-based learning experiences, dual enrollment college credits and often are certified in programs such as Adobe Photoshop. Some academy activities include recording theater performances at local elementary schools and shooting promotional video for local organizations. Their work is shown on the schools daily broadcast and sometimes on a local network affiliate or public television. In 2019, the head of the Video Production Academy, Katie McQuone, won the Milken Educator Award for her leadership.

== Extracurricular activities ==
=== Athletics ===
The school competes in the North Yosemite League.

== Campus ==
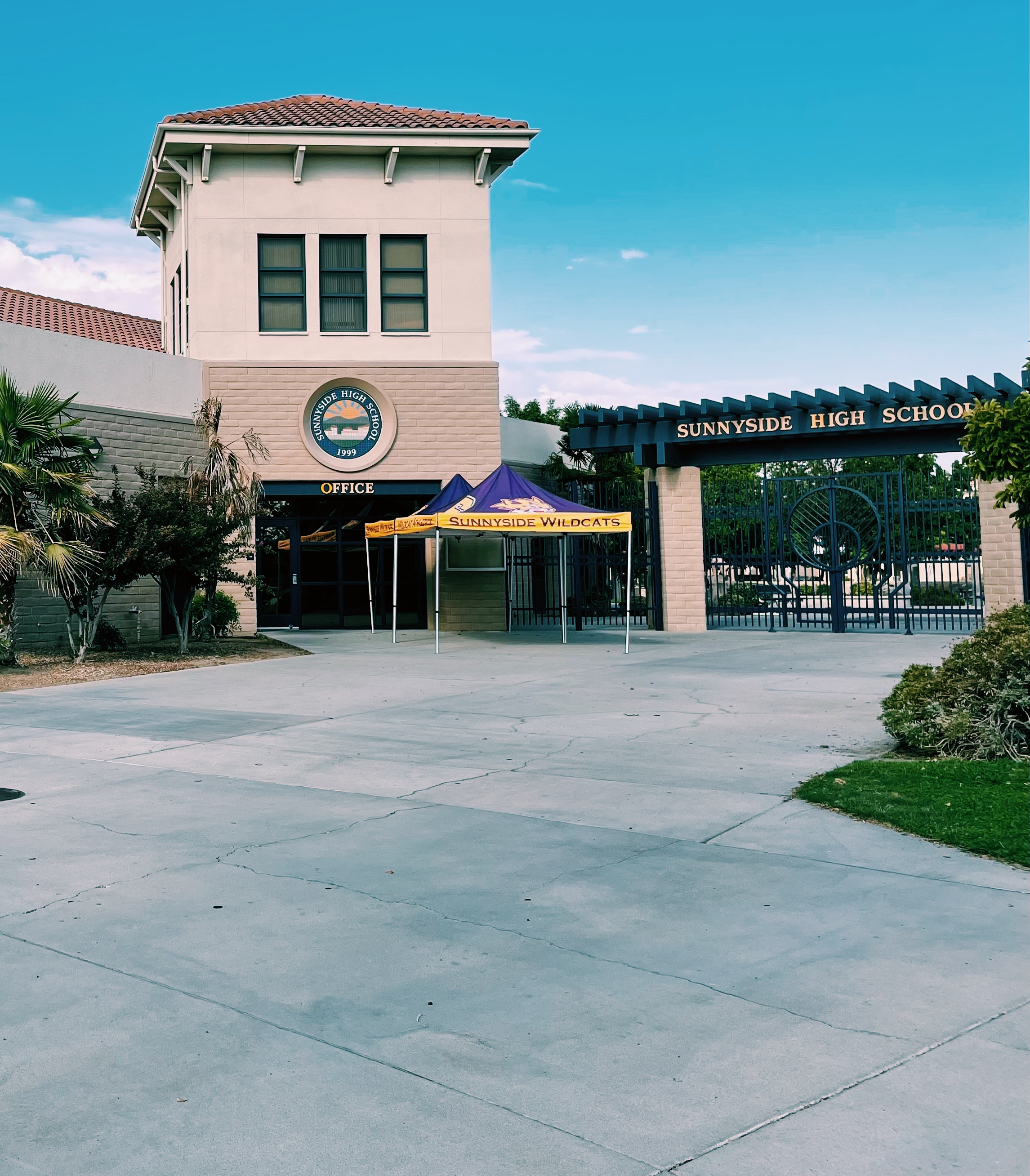
The front office and entry gate of Sunnyside High School in 2022

The school is named for the neighborhood of Fresno that it serves, anchored by the Sunnyside Country Club, established in 1906.

The campus was built on 50 acres at the southeast corner of Peach Avenue and Kings Canyon Road. Architectural firm Wolf, Lang and Christopher led the design effort with Fresno-based Temple-Anderson-Moore on board as associate architects. The design team sought out community input, asking District staff, Sunnyside area neighbors, and representatives from various communities agencies to share their vision for the school. The campus was envisioned as a hub for activities in the southeast Fresno area. A California mission-style campus was the result and the plans were adopted by the school board.

Selma-based Louis C. Nelson and Sons was the general contractor who led construction. The total construction cost was $55 million and it took two years. The combined area of all buildings totals 319,959 ft (97,524 m).

The campus features 109 classrooms, with a special emphasis on computer technology. Events can be held in the 530-seat theater, as well as the 80-seat lecture hall. The lighted football stadium has 4,963 seats and an all-weather track. The aquatics center includes a competition pool, a diving pool, a 3' deep learning pool as well as offices, changing rooms and a concession stand. The campus also has 12 outdoor lighted tennis courts and 4 competition ball diamonds.

== Notable alumni ==
- Destiny Wagner, Miss Earth 2021
- Marc Castro, professional boxer
