= Bryson Williams =

American basketball player (born 1998)

No. 11 – Pallacanestro Reggiana
- Position: Power forward
- League: LBA

Personal information
- Born: April 25, 1998 (age 28) Fresno, California, U.S.
- Listed height: 6 ft 8 in (2.03 m)
- Listed weight: 240 lb (109 kg)

Career information
- High school: Roosevelt (Fresno, California)
- College: Fresno State (2016–2018); UTEP (2019–2021); Texas Tech (2021–2022)
- NBA draft: 2022: undrafted
- Playing career: 2022–present

Career history
- 2022–2024: Ontario Clippers
- 2023: JL Bourg
- 2024: Bnei Herzliya
- 2024: Saskatchewan Rattlers
- 2024–2025: Petkim Spor
- 2025–present: Reggio Emilia

Career highlights
- First-team All-Big 12 (2022); First-team All-Conference USA (2020); Third-team All-Conference USA (2021); Third-team All-Mountain West (2018)
- Stats at NBA.com
- Stats at Basketball Reference

Bryson Najee Williams (born April 25, 1998) is an American professional basketball player for Pallacanestro Reggiana of the Italian Lega Basket Serie A (LBA). He played college basketball for the Fresno State Bulldogs, UTEP Miners and Texas Tech Red Raiders.

== High school career ==
Williams played basketball for Theodore Roosevelt High School in Fresno, California. As a Freshman, His Team would finish 15–14 and finish second in the North Yosemite League, His Team lost in the second round of the CIF Central Section to Mission Oak High School, His Team finished Top 10 in the CIF Central D3 Basketball. As a Sophomore, His Team would finish 27–8 and finish first in the North Yosemite League, His Team finished Top 15 in the CIF's Central Section, His Team reached CIF Central Section D3 Championship but lost to NYL League rival Fresno High School. As a Junior, His Team would go 24–5 and finish first in the North Yosemite League, His Team would finish Top 10 in the CIF's Central Section, His Team reached Central Section's D2 Semi-Finals but lost to Mission Oak High School. As a senior, he averaged 34 points and 18 rebounds per game. His Team would also have a 25–8 record and finish first place in the North Yosemite League, ranked Top 15 in the Central Section, Top 35 in CIF D3 Men's Basketball and 1st in the Central Section's D3 Men's Basketball, and win the CIF Central Section D3 Men's Basketball Championship against Selma High School. He set school and city records with 2,302 career points. Williams formed a relationship with Fresno State head coach Rodney Terry in eighth grade and committed to play college basketball for the program as soon as he was old enough.

== College career ==
As a freshman at Fresno State, Williams averaged 7.7 points and 4.4 rebounds per game. He was the runner-up for the Mountain West Freshman of the Year award. As a sophomore, Williams averaged 13.8 points and 6.1 rebounds per game, and received Third Team All-Mountain West honors from the league's coaches. For his junior season, he transferred to UTEP, following head coach Rodney Terry. He sat out a year as a redshirt and worked on his shooting. On January 15, 2020, Williams posted a career-high 34 points and 10 rebounds in an 80–77 overtime win against UTSA. He averaged 17.8 points and 7.2 rebounds per game as a junior, and was named to the First Team All-Conference USA. In his senior season, Williams averaged 15.1 points and 7.4 rebounds per game, earning Third Team All-Conference USA honors. He opted to use an additional year of eligibility, granted due to the COVID-19 pandemic, transferring to Texas Tech. On February 22, 2022, Williams surpassed the 2,000 point mark in a 66–42 win over Oklahoma, and finished with 13 points. For his super-senior year, Williams received First Team All-Big 12 and Big 12 All-Newcomer Team honors from the league's coaches.

== Professional career ==
=== Ontario Clippers (2022–2023) ===
On October 24, 2022, Williams joined the Ontario Clippers training camp roster.

=== JL Bourg (2023) ===
On May 2, 2023, Williams signed with JL Bourg of the Betclic Élite.

=== Return to Ontario (2023–2024) ===
On October 2, 2023, Williams signed with the Los Angeles Clippers, but was waived on October 20. Ten days later, he rejoined the Ontario Clippers.

=== Bnei Herzliya (2024) ===
On March 28, 2024, Williams signed with Bnei Herzliya of the Israeli Basketball Premier League. He played 10 games for the team, averaging 17.1 points (6th in the league), 7.6 rebounds (4th), and 1.0 blocks (8th) per game.

=== Saskatchewan Rattlers (2024) ===
On May 1, 2024, Williams signed with the Saskatchewan Rattlers of the Canadian Elite Basketball League.

=== Petkim Spor (2024–2025) ===
On August 7, 2024, Williams signed with Petkim Spor of the Basketbol Süper Ligi.

=== Pallacanestro Reggiana (2025–present) ===
On June 28, 2025, he signed with Pallacanestro Reggiana of the Italian Lega Basket Serie A (LBA).

== Career statistics ==
Legend
GP	Games played	GS	Games started	MPG	Minutes per game
FG%	Field goal percentage	3P%	3-point field goal percentage	FT%	Free throw percentage
RPG	Rebounds per game	APG	Assists per game	SPG	Steals per game
BPG	Blocks per game	PPG	Points per game	**Bold**	Career high

=== College ===
Year	Team	GP	GS	MPG	FG%	3P%	FT%	RPG	APG	SPG	BPG	PPG
2016–17	Fresno State	**33**	26	17.2	**.603**	–	.652	4.4	.2	.4	.6	7.7
2017–18	Fresno State	32	**32**	28.6	.596	.250	.602	6.1	**1.2**	.5	.7	13.8
2018–19	UTEP	Redshirt										
2019–20	UTEP	32	**32**	**31.8**	.499	.356	.811	7.2	.9	**.9**	**.9**	**17.8**
2020–21	UTEP	24	24	31.4	.481	.279	**.836**	**7.4**	.9	.6	.5	15.1
2021–22	Texas Tech	37	37	25.6	.535	**.417**	.755	4.2	1.1	.5	.4	14.1
Career		158	151	26.6	.569	.357	.740	5.7	.8	.6	.6	13.6
