= Justin Garza High School =

Public secondary school in Fresno, California, United States

Location
- 4100 N Grantland Ave. Fresno, California 93723; United States; 36°47′42″N 119°54′50″W

Information
- Type: Public high school
- Motto: Stand For More
- Established: 2021; 5 years ago
- School district: Central Unified School District
- Superintendent: Mark Marshall
- CEEB code: 054997
- NCES School ID: 060797014570
- Principal: Harman Dhillon
- Teaching staff: 91.67 (FTE)
- Grades: 9–12
- Gender: Coeducational
- Enrollment: 2,095 (2024-2025)
- Student to teacher ratio: 22.85
- Campus type: Suburban
- Colors: Blue and Red
- Athletics conference: County Metro League
- Mascot: Justin Garza Guardians
- Rival: Central East High School & Central High School
- Accreditation: Western Association of Schools and Colleges
- Feeder schools: Glacier Point Middle School
- Website: jghs.centralunified.org

Justin Garza High School is a public high school serving the rural area west of Fresno, California.

== History ==
=== Funding ===
In the early 2000s, administrators for the Central Unified School District noted growing enrollment and identified the district owned land next to Deran Koligian Stadium as the likely site for a new high school.

In 2008, voters passed Measure B, authorizing $152 million in bonds for improvements at existing schools as well as new campuses, including a new high school. The Great Recession of 2008 reduced the assessed home values in the area which made the full funding unsustainable. The bond amount was reduced to $64.7 million and delayed the ability to design and construct a high school. When asked about the delay, district administrator Kelly Porterfield described it: "...in 2008, the recession hit and with that went funding for the project."

In 2016, voters by a comfortable margin passed Measure C, which reauthorized the 2008 Measure B balance of $87.3 million, allowing the first phase of school construction to finally move forward. The project was also aided by California state matching funds.

Harris Construction won the construction bid and broke ground on June 29, 2019, in a ceremony attended by Congressman Jim Costa, Assemblymen Joaquin Arambula and Jim Patterson, and Fresno City Council members. Construction took about two years and cost approximately $130 million.

=== Naming, logo and boundaries ===
The district sought public input for the naming of the new school and they received over 200 proposed names, including former President Barack Obama, former Fresno Mayor Lee Brand, and social media celebrity Lovely Peaches. When the school board brought the matter up for an official decision in May 2020, discussion centered around two options, naming it after former Central High School coach Justin Garza or utilizing a directional name, such as Central North.

Justin Garza was the head football coach at Central High from 2012 through 2015, becoming a beloved campus and community figure after starting his career as a teacher there in 1999 and also serving as a football, track and golf assistant. Garza died in February 2017 at the age of 41, after six years of battling Hodgkin lymphoma. A community survey showed more support for the name "Central North," which led to a split board vote, but ultimately the name Justin Garza High School was selected in a 4-2 vote.

District boundaries were also a point of contention, coming up for a vote at an October 27, 2020 board meeting. Three options were discussed, one with the Garza area wrapping around the Central East area like a giant letter C, while the other options were a north/south pattern and an east/west pattern.

At the time of this discussion, the district had only one high school, Central High, but it was split into two campuses: "Central East", which opened in 1996 and sits at Cornelia and Dakota avenues, and "Central West", which opened in 1922 and sits at McKinley and Dickenson avenues. In all boundary options, the Central West campus would be converted to a school of choice with a strong agriculture program.

In a 5-1 vote, the board chose the north/south district pattern, a map that board member Naindeep Singh Chann said slightly favored the more affluent areas. Chann ultimately cast no vote.

The Guardians mascot and logo were revealed by Central Unified Superintendent Andrew Alvarado on October 5, 2020.

=== Opening ===
The school opened on August 11, 2021, with the Garza family as featured guests. The school served grades 9 through 10 during its first year of operation and phased in grade 11 in the fall of 2022. Grade 12 is slated to be added in the fall of 2023, completing the phase-in process.

== Campus ==
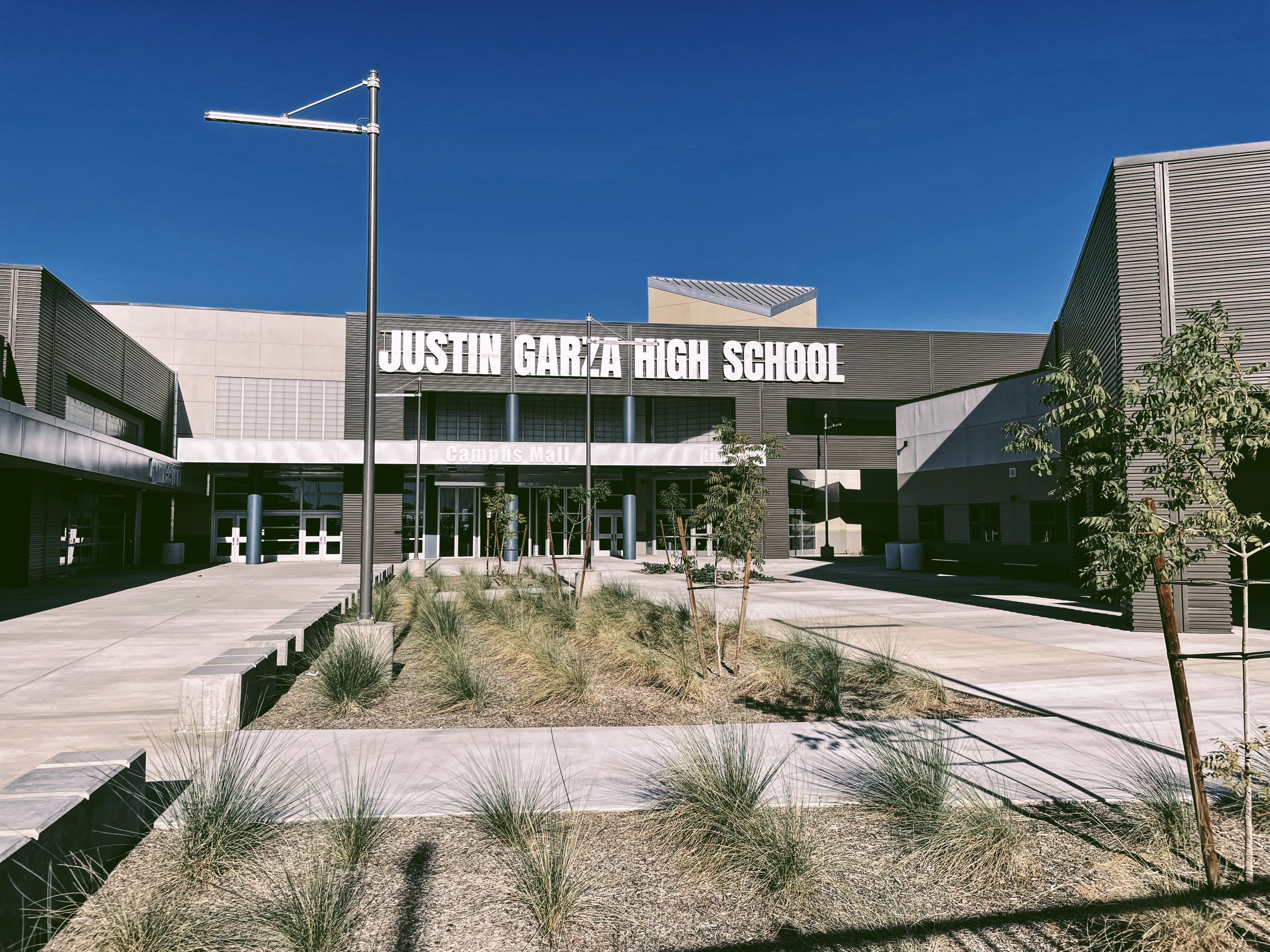
Garza High campus mall in 2022

The school sits sit on the northeast corner of Ashlan and Grantland avenues, adjacent to Harvest Elementary, Glacier Point Middle School and Koligian Stadium. The site was previously an empty plot of land.

When the campus first opened, it consisted of three two-story classroom buildings, an administration building, a building containing two gyms, a locker room building, kitchen, campus mall, ball fields, tennis courts, and exterior basketball courts. The three two-story buildings each houses multiple labs and classrooms allowing for flexible learning environments. A unique feature of the school is a community plaza outdoor mall that leads into an indoor campus mall. The indoor mall has a glass ceiling to let in natural light.

The district has continued to design and construct additional facilities for the school, including a performance arts building and a pool complex.

== Extracurriculars ==
=== Athletics ===
The Justin Garza Athletic Department offers cross country, football, golf (boys and girls), tennis (boys and girls), volleyball (boys and girls), water polo (boys and girls), basketball (boys and girls), soccer (boys and girls), wrestling, badminton, baseball, competitive sport cheer, softball, swim & dive and track & field. The sports are separated into fall, winter and spring sports seasons.

The athletic director is Hovig Torigian and Yosef Fares was selected to be the first head football coach. Fares graduated from Fresno State and had previously been a head coach at Madera and Bullard High Schools. In addition to his duties at the school, Fares was selected to work with the Atlanta Falcons during the 2022 season as part of the Bill Walsh Diversity Coaching Fellowship.

The school competes in the County Metro League.

=== Performing arts ===
The performing arts program consists of choir, modern dance, band, color guard, guitar and theatre. The school's first organized musical was In The Heights by Lin-Manuel Miranda which was performed in March 2022. Garza is a member of the Western Band Association.
