= North Yosemite League =

High school athletic league in California

The North Yosemite League is a high school athletics league that is a part of the CIF Central Section. It encompasses public high schools in Fresno County and Madera, California

The current NYL was formed before the start of the 1996-97 school year when the Central Section broke up the Northeast Yosemite League and Northwest Yosemite League..

The old NYL was a conference formed in 1951, and was considered the premier athletic league in the Central Section up until 1994, when it devolved into the NEYL and NWYL. Original members of the NYL include: Fresno, Roosevelt, Merced, Visalia, Madera, Hanford and Edison.

In 1955, Visalia split up into Redwood and Mt. Whitney High Schools and followed Hanford out of the NYL, leaving it with 5 teams. Clovis joined the league in 1957, Bullard and McLane came on in 1959, Hoover in 1963. Merced bolted to the Sac-Joaquin Section in 1968. Clovis West joined the NYL in 1979 and Sanger in 1981 to complete the 10-school roster.

With Buchanan and Central being upgraded to Large School status (D-I) in 1994, the Central Section decided to split up the NYL into two leagues of six. Buchanan, Clovis, Hoover, McLane, Roosevelt, and Sanger made up the NEYL. While Bullard, Central, Clovis West, Edison, Fresno, and Madera made up the NWYL.

For the 2022-2023 school year, Reedley High School will be moved to the Tri-County Athletic Conference. Madera South High School, Matilda Torres High School, and Sanger West High School will be added to the North Yosemite League

It is one of the top leagues in the Fresno area.

There is a seasonal selection of All League players in the scope of sports administered by the league.

== Members ==
- Fresno High School
- Hoover High School
- McLane High School
- Roosevelt High School
- Sunnyside High School
- Madera South High School
- Sanger West High School
- Matilda Torres High School
