= County Metro League =

High school athletic league in California

The County Metro League is a high school athletic league that is part of the CIF Central Section.

For the 2022–2023 school year, Justin Garza High School joined the league. San Joaquin Memorial High School was the state champion in Basketball in 2023.

There is a seasonal selection of All League players in the scope of sports administered by the league.

== Members ==
- Bullard High School
- Edison High School
- Madera High School
- San Joaquin Memorial High School
- Sanger High School
- Justin Garza High School
