= Pronovost =

Pronovost is a surname. Notable people with the surname include:

- André Pronovost (1936–2026), Canadian ice hockey player
- Claude Pronovost (born 1935), Canadian ice hockey player
- Denis Pronovost (born 1953), Canadian politician
- Jean Pronovost (born 1945), Canadian ice hockey player
- Marcel Pronovost (1930–2015), Canadian ice hockey player and coach
- Mike Pronovost (born 1989), American Internet entrepreneur
- Peter Pronovost (born 1965), American anesthesiologist
