= Gary Alcorn =

American basketball player (1936–2006)

Personal information
- Born: October 8, 1936 Calwa, California, U.S.
- Died: November 29, 2006 (aged 70) Fresno, California, U.S.
- Listed height: 6 ft 9 in (2.06 m)
- Listed weight: 225 lb (102 kg)

Career information
- High school: Roosevelt (Fresno, California)
- College: Fresno CC (1954–1956); Fresno State (1956–1959)
- NBA draft: 1959: 3rd round, 16th overall pick
- Drafted by: Detroit Pistons
- Playing career: 1959–1960
- Position: Center
- Number: 16, 24

Career history
- 1959–1960: Detroit Pistons
- 1960: Los Angeles Lakers

Career highlights
- First-team All-WCAC (1957)

Career statistics
- Points: 261 (3.3 ppg)
- Rebounds: 329 (4.2 rpg)
- Assists: 24 (0.3 apg)
- Stats at NBA.com
- Stats at Basketball Reference

Gary R. Alcorn (October 8, 1936 – November 29, 2006) was an American professional basketball player. He played parts of two seasons in the National Basketball Association (NBA) for the Detroit Pistons and Los Angeles Lakers from 1959 to 1960.

== Early life ==
Alcorn was born and raised on a small farm in Calwa, California. His father was an avid outdoorsman and taught him how to hunt and fish. Alcorn attended Theodore Roosevelt High School in Fresno, California, and led the basketball team to a North Yosemite League title during his senior year.

== Playing career ==
Alcorn started his college basketball career at Fresno City College where he helped the Rams to a state championship in 1955 and a third-place finish in 1956. He also played for the Fresno State Bulldogs of the West Coast Athletic Conference (WCAC) where his 333 points during the 1956–57 season surpassed a league record that was set by Bill Russell the previous season. Alcorn led the Bulldogs in scoring and rebounds all three seasons he played. He was selected to the All-WCAC first team in 1957.

Alcorn was selected by the Minneapolis Lakers as the 83rd overall pick in the 1958 NBA draft and the Detroit Pistons as the 18th overall pick in the 1959 NBA draft. He played in the National Basketball Association (NBA) for the Pistons during his rookie season in 1959–60. Alcorn signed as a free agent with the Lakers on October 24, 1960, and appeared in 20 games before he was waived on December 15, 1960. His basketball career ended prematurely because of knee problems.

Alcorn was inducted into the Fresno County Athletic Hall of Fame in 1982.

== Post-playing career ==
Alcorn entered the sporting goods business in 1955 when he was hired as a salesman for Hanoian's Sporting Goods, where he later became manager of the fishing department. He opened his own Fresno store, Alcorn's Sporting Goods, in 1985. Alcorn sold the business in 1998.

Alcorn was involved in the establishment of the organization Kokanee Power that helped to introduce popular game fish to lakes and reservoirs in central California.

== Personal life ==
Alcorn was married to Margaret and had one son. He was an accomplished bass and sport fisherman, trap shooter and hunter.

Alcorn died on November 29, 2006, at the age of 70.

Alcorn's grandson, Cade, played college basketball for the Montana State Billings Yellowjackets.

== Career statistics ==
Legend
| GP | Games played | GS | Games started | MPG | Minutes per game |
| FG% | Field goal percentage | 3P% | 3-point field goal percentage | FT% | Free throw percentage |
| RPG | Rebounds per game | APG | Assists per game | SPG | Steals per game |
| BPG | Blocks per game | PPG | Points per game | **Bold** | Career high |

=== NBA ===
==== Regular season ====
| Year | Team | GP | MPG | FG% | FT% | RPG | APG | PPG |
|---|---|---|---|---|---|---|---|---|
| 1959–60 | Detroit | **58** | **11.6** | .292 | .571 | **4.8** | **.4** | **4.0** |
| 1960–61 | L.A. Lakers | 20 | 8.7 | **.300** | **.785** | 2.5 | .1 | 1.6 |
| Career | | 78 | 10.8 | .293 | .598 | 4.2 | .3 | 3.3 |
