= Courtney Griffin =

American football player (born 1966)

No. 42, 25
- Position: Defensive back

Personal information
- Born: December 19, 1966 (age 59); Madera, California, U.S.
- Listed height: 5 ft 10 in (1.78 m)
- Listed weight: 180 lb (82 kg)

Career information
- High school: Fresno (CA) Central
- College: Fresno State
- NFL draft: 1991: undrafted

Career history
- Los Angeles Rams (1992–1993); Baltimore Stallions (1995); Toronto Argonauts (1996); Montreal Alouettes (1996); Winnipeg Blue Bombers (1997)

Awards and highlights
- Grey Cup champion (1995)
- Stats at Pro Football Reference

Courtney Griffin (born December 19, 1966) is an American former professional football defensive back. He played for the Los Angeles Rams in 1993, the Baltimore Stallions in 1995, the Toronto Argonauts and Montreal Alouettes in 1996 and for the Winnipeg Blue Bombers in 1997.
