= San Joaquin Memorial High School =

Location
- 1406 North Fresno Street; Fresno, California 93703; United States; 36°45′45″N 119°46′49″W

Information
- Type: Private, coeducational
- Religious affiliation: Roman Catholic
- Established: 1945
- Founder: Reverend Philip Scher
- Superintendent: Joan Bouchard
- Head of school: Racheal Rosas & Luis Flores
- Faculty: 43
- Grades: 9-12
- Enrollment: 605 (2010-2011)
  - Grade 9: 150
  - Grade 10: 152
  - Grade 11: 136
  - Grade 12: 144
- Average class size: 24
- Student to teacher ratio: 15:1
- Colors: Red and Blue
- Athletics conference: County Metro League
- Sports: Football, Cross Country, Water Polo, Tennis, Golf, Girls Lacrosse, Boys Rugby, Basketball, Baseball, Soccer, Softball, Track and Field, Cheer Squad
- Team name: Panthers
- Rival: Garces Memorial High School, Bullard High School (Fresno, California)
- Accreditation: Western Association of Schools and Colleges
- Newspaper: The Red and Blue
- Yearbook: Spirit
- Tuition: $14,700 (2025-2026 school year)
- Website: http://www.sjmhs.org

San Joaquin Memorial High School is a private Roman Catholic high school in Fresno, California, United States. Founded in 1945, it is the only Catholic high school in the Fresno metropolitan area. It is in the Roman Catholic Diocese of Fresno and has a current enrollment of about 430 students.

== Athletics ==
San Joaquin Memorial High School is part of the County Metro League of the Central Section.

== Notable alumni ==
- Jim Costa, United States Congressman
- Pete Dalena, professional baseball player and coach.
- Henry S. Ensher, American Career Foreign Service Officer
- Jalen Green, professional basketball player
- TJ Hall, college football player
- Josh Kelly, NFL football player
- Brook Lopez, professional basketball player
- Robin Lopez, professional basketball player
- Jalen McMillan, professional football player
- Frank Ortenzio, professional baseball player
- Cliff Pondexter, professional basketball player
- Roscoe Pondexter, professional basketball player
- Quincy Pondexter, professional basketball player
- Mike Pronovost, Internet entrepreneur and founder and CEO of Powerband and Pronovost Technologies
- Ethan Quinn, tennis player
- Ruthie Quinto, CFO and Deputy Superintendent Fresno Unified School District
- Phil Roman, animator of the Peanuts and Garfield animated specials
- Jeff Schattinger, professional baseball player
- Sybil Smith, All-American collegiate swimmer and mother of Sloane Stephens
- Robert Upshaw, professional basketball player
- Gary L. Wolfram, William E. Simon Professor in Economics and Public Policy at Hillsdale College
- Maximilian Arfsten, professional soccer player who won the 2023 MLS Cup with the Columbus Crew
