= Central Unified School District =

School district in California, United States

Address
- 5652 W. Gettysburg Ave. Fresno, California, 93722; United States

District information
- Type: Public
- Grades: K–12
- NCES District ID: 0607970

Students and staff
- Students: 15,742
- Teachers: 660.81
- Staff: 806.71
- Student–teacher ratio: 23.82

Other information
- Website: www.centralunified.org

The Central Unified School District is a school district in Fresno County, California. Incorporates approximately 88 square miles (230 km^{2}) of suburban population and ag land.

The district includes Biola and parts of Fresno and West Park.

== List of schools ==
Here is a list of all the schools in the Central Unified School District:

=== Elementary schools ===
- Biola-Pershing Elementary School
- Harvest Elementary School
- Herndon-Barstow Elementary School
- Houghton-Kearney Middle School
- Jaswant Singh Khalra Elementary School
- Liddell Elementary School
- Central Elementary School
- Madison Elementary
- McKinley Elementary School, Santa Barbara, California|McKinley Elementary School
- River Bluff Elementary School
- Roosevelt Elementary School (Fresno, California)|Roosevelt Elementary School
- Saroyan Elementary School
- Steinbeck Elementary School
- Teague Elementary School
- Hanh Phan Tilley Elementary School

=== Middle ===
- El Capitan Middle School
- Glacier Point School
- Rio Vista Middle School

=== High schools ===
- Central High School (Fresno, California)
- Central East High School (Fresno, California)
- Justin Garza High School
- Pershing Continuation High School
- Pathway Community Day School

=== Adult education ===
- Central Adult School (CLASS)

=== Future Schools ===
New Elementary School(opening August 2025)

== See also ==
- List of school districts in Fresno County, California
