= Madera South High School =

Coordinates: 36°56′21.55″N 120°3′59.78″W

Location
- 705 W. Pecan Ave. Madera, Madera County, California 93637; United States

Information
- Established: 1990
- School district: Madera Unified School District
- Principal: Jennifer Thao
- Teaching staff: 85.50 (FTE)
- Grades: 9–12
- Age: 14 to 18
- Enrollment: 1,855 (2023–2024)
- Student to teacher ratio: 21.70
- Colors: Purple and Black
- Fight song: All Praise Stallion Pride
- Nickname: Stallions
- Rival: Madera High
- Newspaper: Stallion Stampede
- Website: mshs.maderausd.org

Madera South High School (also known as Madera South, Madera South High or MSHS) is a high school located in Madera, California and is part of the Madera Unified School District. Previously functioning as the second campus of the town's other high school, Madera High, the school officially became Madera's second official high school in August 2006.

== Courses ==
Similar to Madera High School, Madera South High features many "career schools"—i.e., mini-schools located within the campus, customized for whichever career a student wishes to choose from. Current career schools include:

- Agriculture
- Business/Human Services (originally two separate career schools prior to 2006)
- Humanities (performing arts, etc.)
- Health Sciences

== Athletics ==
Madera South High School competes in the North Yosemite League of the CIF Central Section

Fall Sports:

- Cross country
- Football
- Girls Golf
- Girls Tennis
- Girls Volleyball
- Gymnastics
- Water polo
- Cheer & Dance

Winter Sports:

- Girls Basketball
- Boys Basketball
- Boys Soccer
- Girls Soccer
- Wrestling
- Cheer & Dance

Spring Sports:

- Baseball
- Boys Golf
- Softball
- Boys Tennis
- Swimming
- Track and field
- Boys Volleyball

== Agriculture ==
The Agriculture Department hosts the Madera FFA Chapter. The Madera FFA Chapter was founded in the same year as the National FFA Organization in 1928.

== First graduating class ==
In 2009, Madera South graduated their first class as a high school. Even though the Class of 2009 was mixed with Madera High students their freshman year (2005–2006), the two schools were completely separated by their senior year (2008–2009)

== Feeder schools ==
The middle school(s) that feed into Madera South are: Martin Luther King Jr, Middle School.

The elementary schools that feed into Martin Luther King Jr, Middle School are: Alpha Elementary School, Chavez Elementary School, Eastin-Arcola Elementary School, La Vina Elementary School, Millview Elementary School, Parkwood Elementary School, Virginia Lee Rose Elementary School, and Sierra Vista Elementary School.
