= Jason Wood (baseball) =

American baseball player & coach (born 1969)

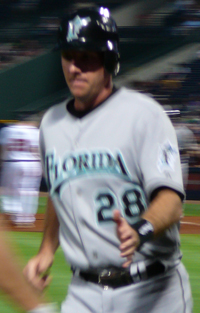
- Wood, playing for the Marlins in June 2007
- Infielder
- Born: December 16, 1969 (age 55); San Bernardino, California, U.S.
- Batted: Right Threw: Right

MLB debut
- April 1, 1998, for the Oakland Athletics

Last MLB appearance
- April 2, 2008, for the Florida Marlins

MLB statistics
- Batting average: .245
- Home runs: 5
- Runs batted in: 36
- Stats at Baseball Reference

Teams
- Oakland Athletics (1998); Detroit Tigers (1998–1999); Florida Marlins (2006–2008)

Jason William Wood (born December 16, 1969) is an American former professional baseball player. He played all or parts of five seasons in Major League Baseball (MLB) as an infielder, primarily used at first base.

== Amateur career ==
Wood attended McLane High School and then Fresno State University. Originally, Wood was drafted by the Toronto Blue Jays in the 56th round (1,333rd overall) of the 1989 Major League Baseball draft. Opting not to sign with the Blue Jays, he was then drafted by the Atlanta Braves in the 39th round (1,009th overall) in the 1990 Major League Baseball draft, but decided to continue at Fresno State. Finally, after being drafted by the Oakland Athletics in the 11th round (308th overall) of the 1991 Major League Baseball draft, he signed.

== Professional career ==
=== Oakland Athletics ===
Wood, who had fair power, started off his professional career by playing in the minor leagues for seven seasons from 1991 to 1997. In 1994, he was a Southern League All-Star. He had a breakout minor league season in 1997 when he played for the Triple-A Edmonton Trappers. That year, he played in 130 games, batted .321 with 19 home runs and 87 RBI. His 1997 minor league season included helping the Trappers win the Pacific Coast League championship. He was released on October 17 the same year, but re-signed with the Athletics organization ten days later on October 27.

In 1998, Wood made the Athletics' Opening Day roster. He made his major league debut at the age of 28 against the Boston Red Sox on April 1, 1998, as a defensive replacement. About a week into the season, he was sent down to Triple-A.

=== Detroit Tigers ===
On July 18, 1998, he was sent to the Detroit Tigers as the player to be named later in the deal that sent Bip Roberts to the Athletics on June 23, 1998. Once acquired, he was sent to Triple-A to play with the Toledo Mud Hens. He was recalled in September by the big league club when rosters expanded. On September 9, 1998, he made his first career start against the Chicago White Sox as the designated hitter. He collected his first career hit, which was a single against Jim Parque. Overall, he played in a total of 13 games and batted .333 (8–24) with 1 home run in 1998.

In 1999, Wood bounced around between the minors and majors in the Tigers organization. He played in 27 games at the major league level and batted just .159 (7–44) with 1 home run. Following the season, he was released on October 15.

=== Pittsburgh Pirates ===
On November 17, 1999, he signed with the Pittsburgh Pirates. He played for the Triple-A Nashville Sounds for the whole 2000 season. He just batted .237 with 7 home runs in 88 games. He returned to the Pirates organization for the 2001 season. He played for the Sounds for the entire season again and his performance was not much better than the previous season. He was released following the 2001 season.

=== Florida Marlins ===
Wood signed a contract with the Florida Marlins on March 8, 2002. He played for the Triple-A Calgary Cannons for the entire 2002 season. Despite playing in 121 games in which he batted .315 (144–457) with 15 home runs, 70 RBI and making the Pacific Coast League postseason All-Star team, he did not join the major league club at all throughout the year, even in September when rosters expanded. From 2003 to 2005, Wood played the entire seasons in the Marlins organization with the Triple-A Albuquerque Isotopes. He batted .296 in 2003, .245 in 2004, and .301 in 2005.

In 2006, Wood once again began the season with the Albuquerque Isotopes. He played with the Isotopes for the entire 2006 minor league season. He batted .288 (127–441) with 11 home runs and 77 RBI in 123 games. The Marlins purchased his contract on September 5 following the conclusion of the minor league season. Wood had returned to the major leagues after a six-year absence. On September 9, against the Philadelphia Phillies, he recorded his first major league hit since 1999 when he was with the Detroit Tigers. Overall in the majors in 2006, Wood played in 12 games, mainly as a pinch hitter. He batted .462 (6–13).

Wood was released by the Marlins following the 2006 season, but re-signed with them on January 4, 2007. He had signed a minor league contract that included an invitation to spring training. In spring training, he finished strong, batting .378 (17–45) with 2 home runs in 22 games. This prompted the Marlins to purchase his contract on April 1, 2007, before the regular season began. The Marlins had purchased Wood's contract despite him being a 37-year-old player with barely any major league experience (52 games in parts of 3 different seasons in 16 professional seasons). Wood stayed on the active roster for the whole 2007 season and was mainly used as a pinch hitter. Wood played in 98 games in 2007 and batted .239 with 3 home runs.

On April 5, 2008, Wood was designated for assignment by the Marlins to open a roster spot for the recently re-acquired Wes Helms. He spent the rest of the season, his final as a professional, back with the Isotopes.

=== Pitching ===
Wood pitched a total of three innings in his professional career. Two came in 1996 while in the minor leagues. On June 29, 2007, Wood pitched one inning of perfect relief in a 12–3 loss to the Atlanta Braves.

== Coaching career ==
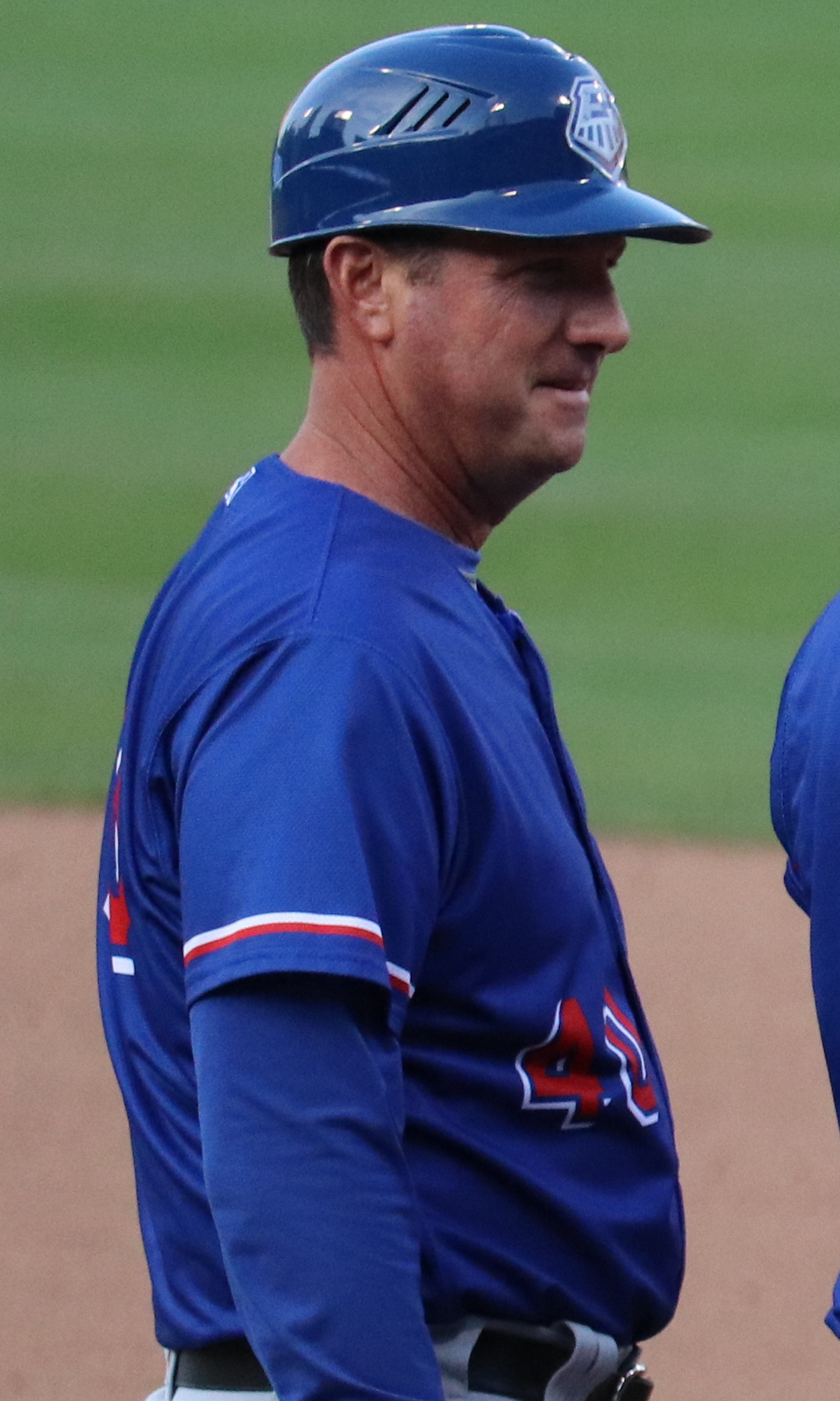
Wood with the Round Rock Express in 2018

On October 31, 2008, Wood was announced as the hitting instructor for the Inland Empire 66ers of San Bernardino in the Los Angeles Dodgers organization, however, he was named the hitting coach for Bakersfield Blaze of the Class A-Advanced California League in the Texas Rangers organization on December 29, 2008, and served in that role through the 2010 season. He served as the manager of the Myrtle Beach Pelicans of the Class A-Advanced Carolina League from 2011 through the 2013 season. He was the manager of the Frisco RoughRiders of the Double-A Texas League for the 2014 season. He served as the manager of the Round Rock Express of the Triple-A Pacific Coast League from 2015 through the 2018 season. In 2019, he became the manager of the Nashville Sounds of the Triple-A Pacific Coast League, when they became a Rangers affiliate prior to that season. Wood was released by Texas following the 2019 season.
