= Madera Municipal Airport =

Airport in Madera, California

- IATA: MAE; ICAO: KMAE; FAA LID: MAE

Summary
- Airport type: Public
- Owner: City of Madera
- Serves: Madera, California
- Elevation AMSL: 255 ft / 78 m
- Coordinates: 36°59′19″N 120°06′45″W

Map

Runways
Direction	Length		Surface
Direction	ft	m	Surface
12/30	5,545	1,690	Asphalt
7/25	3,702	1,128	Asphalt

Statistics
- Aircraft operations (2015): 50,950
- Based aircraft (2017): 140
- Source: Federal Aviation Administration

Madera Municipal Airport (IATA: MAE, ICAO: KMAE, FAA LID: MAE) is three miles (4.8 km) northwest of Madera, in Madera County, California. The FAA's National Plan of Integrated Airport Systems for 2011–2015 categorized it as a general aviation facility.

== Facilities ==
The airport covers 524 acres (212 ha) at an elevation of 255 feet (78 m). It has two asphalt runways: 12/30 is 5,545 by 150 feet (1,690 x 46 m) and 7/25 is 3,702 by 150 feet (1,128 x 46 m).

In the year ending November 18, 2015, the airport had 50,950 aircraft operations, average 139 per day: 96% general aviation, 1% air taxi, and <1% military. In May 2017, 140 aircraft were based at this airport: 99 single-engine, 13 multi-engine, 10 jets, 8 helicopters, 1 glider, and 9 ultralight.

== History ==
In 1943, the City of Madera leased the airport to the Army Corps of Engineers to be used by the Army Air Force for fueling planes flying north to south. Six months after the end of the war, the land reverted to the city.
