= Oswaldo Lopez =

Long-distance runner

Oswaldo Lopez is a long-distance runner, specializing in Ultramarathons. He is most well known for winning the Badwater Ultramarathon in 2011. He has also won the Iron Horse 100 Miler, the Yellowstone-Teton 100 Miler, the Tahoe Midnight Express Ultra 72 Miler, and other races. Lopez lives in Madera, California.
