= Computech Middle School =

Location
- 555 East Belgravia Avenue; Fresno, California 93706; United States; 35°42′58″N 119°48′18″W

Information
- School type: Public middle school
- Opened: 1983
- School district: Fresno Unified School District
- Principal: Tobaise Brookins
- Faculty: 31
- Grades: 7-8
- Enrollment: 798
- Colors: Black and Gold
- Team name: Tigers
- Website: School website

Computech Middle School is a public school in Fresno, California, United States.

== Organization ==
The school is part of the Fresno Unified School District. Computech is located just south of the Edison High School. It was established in 1983 and buses students in from throughout Fresno. The school offers the Gifted and Talented Education (GATE) program. Students enrolled are selected based on their high STAR (Standardized Testing and Reporting) report and then interviewed. As of the 2011–12 school year there were 791 students enrolled with 31 teachers. Computech Middle School is a Magnet Middle School. The school is technology-oriented, and computer-related subjects are central to its curriculum. A key aim of the school is to promote racial harmony in the school district.

== Awards ==
Computech is a National Blue Ribbon School, and received the award in 1990–1991, 1994–1996, 2001–2002, and 2008-2009 and most recently 2015–2016.

The school was recognized as a California Distinguished School in 2009.

The school won the Electric Car Competition in the 2013 and 2014 National Middle School Science Bowl.
