= West Park, California =

West Park
- census-designated place
- Location in Fresno County and the state of California

- Location in California
- Coordinates: 36°42′37″N 119°51′05″W
- Country: United States
- State: California
- County: Fresno

Area
  - Total: 1.792 sq mi (4.640 km^{2})
  - Land: 1.792 sq mi (4.640 km^{2})
  - Water: 0 sq mi (0 km^{2}) 0%
- Elevation: 266 ft (81 m)

Population (2020)
  - Total: 1,053
  - Density: 587.8/sq mi (226.9/km^{2})
- Time zone: UTC-8 (Pacific (PST))
  - Summer (DST): UTC-7 (PDT)
- GNIS feature IDs: 1656404, 2628799

West Park is a census-designated place in Fresno County, California, United States. It is located five miles (8 km) southwest of downtown Fresno, at an elevation of 266 ft (81 m). As of the 2020 census, West Park had a population of 1,053.

== Demographics ==
Historical population
Census	Pop.	Note	%±
2010	1,157		—
2020	1,053		−9.0%
U.S. Decennial Census; 2010

West Park first appeared as a census designated place in the 2010 U.S. census.

=== 2020 census ===
As of the 2020 census, West Park had a population of 1,053. The population density was 587.6 inhabitants per square mile (226.9/km^{2}). 51.5% of residents lived in urban areas, while 48.5% lived in rural areas.

Racial composition as of the 2020 census
Race	Number	Percent
White	271	25.7%
Black or African American	26	2.5%
American Indian and Alaska Native	60	5.7%
Asian	77	7.3%
Native Hawaiian and Other Pacific Islander	0	0.0%
Some other race	457	43.4%
Two or more races	162	15.4%
Hispanic or Latino (of any race)	804	76.4%

The whole population lived in households. There were 268 households, out of which 109 (40.7%) had children under the age of 18 living in them, 142 (53.0%) were married-couple households, 19 (7.1%) were cohabiting couple households, 48 (17.9%) had a female householder with no spouse or partner present, and 59 (22.0%) had a male householder with no spouse or partner present. 40 households (14.9%) were one person, and 18 (6.7%) were one person aged 65 or older. The average household size was 3.93. There were 211 families (78.7% of all households).

The age distribution was 296 people (28.1%) under the age of 18, 106 people (10.1%) aged 18 to 24, 252 people (23.9%) aged 25 to 44, 243 people (23.1%) aged 45 to 64, and 156 people (14.8%) who were 65 years of age or older. The median age was 35.0 years. For every 100 females, there were 108.1 males, and for every 100 females age 18 and over, there were 107.4 males age 18 and over.

There were 285 housing units at an average density of 159.0 units per square mile (61.4 units/km^{2}). Of these, 268 (94.0%) were occupied, 165 (61.6%) were owner-occupied, and 103 (38.4%) were occupied by renters. The homeowner vacancy rate was 0.0%, and the rental vacancy rate was 2.8%.

== Education ==
Most of the CDP is served by the West Park Elementary School District and the Washington Unified School District for grades 9-12 only. Some of it is within the Central Unified School District.

The sole comprehensive high school of Washington USD is Washington Union High School.
