= Madera County Courthouse =

Historic government building in California, United States

- U.S. National Register of Historic Places
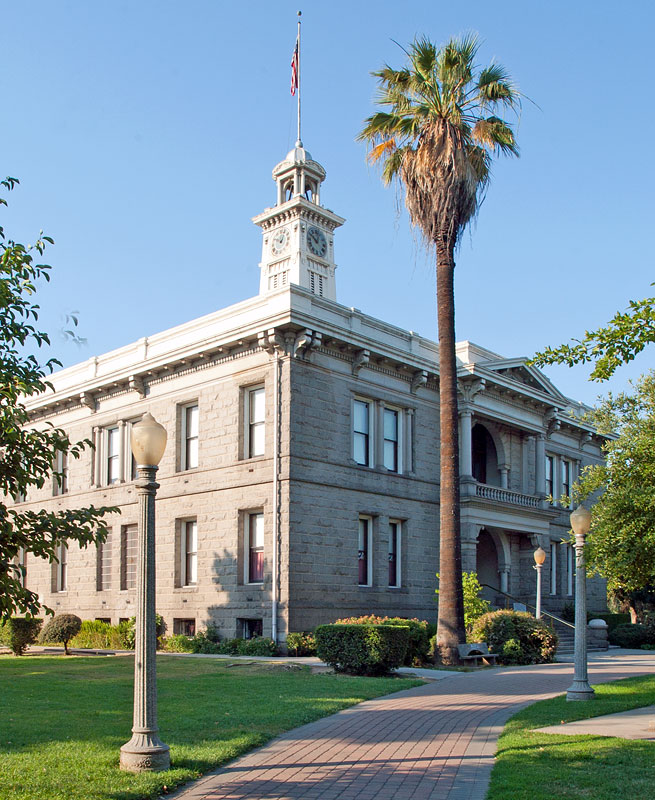

- Location within California Location within the United States
- Location: 210 W. Yosemite Ave., Madera, California
- Coordinates: 36°57′34″N 120°3′39″W
- Area: 5 acres (2.0 ha)
- Built: 1900
- Architectural style: Classical Revival
- NRHP reference No.: 71000162
- Added to NRHP: September 3, 1971

The Madera County Courthouse is the former county courthouse of Madera County, California. The courthouse is located at 210 W. Yosemite Ave. in Madera. It was built in 1900 using granite quarried within the county. The courthouse was the first significant public building constructed in Madera County. The building is topped by a clock tower; the tower fell in a 1906 fire but was rebuilt. In 1953, the county government left the courthouse, as a survey found the building to be unsafe. The Madera County Historical Society later converted the courthouse into a museum.

The Madera County Courthouse was added to the National Register of Historic Places on September 3, 1971.
