= Madera AVA =

Appellation that designates wine in Madera County, California, U.S.

Coordinates: 36°51′29″N 119°59′49″W

Madera
- Wine region
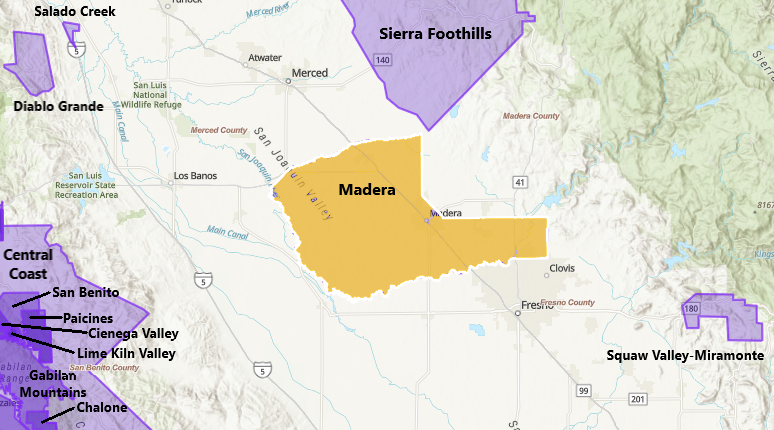
- Type: American Viticultural Area
- Year established: 1984; 1985 Amended
- Years of wine industry: 156
- Country: United States
- Part of: California
- Growing season: 260 to 270 days
- Climate region: Region V
- Heat units: 4,259 GDD
- Precipitation (annual average): 11 to 12 in (280–300 mm)
- Soil conditions: San Joaquin-Madera, Cometa-Whitney and Hanford-Tujunga soil series
- Total area: 230,000 acres (359 sq mi)
- Size of planted vineyards: 31,179 acres (12,618 ha)
- Grapes produced: Barbera, Black Muscat, Cabernet Franc, Cabernet Sauvignon, Carmenere, Chardonnay, Colombard, Grenache, Malbec, Malvasia, Merlot, Muscat Canelli, Muscat of Alexandria, Orange Muscat, Petit Verdot, Petite Sirah, Riesling, Souzao, Syrah, Tinta Cao, Tinta Madeira, Touriga Nacional, Valdiguie, Viognier, Zinfandel
- No. of wineries: 18

Madera is an American Viticultural Area (AVA) located in Central California expanding across Madera and a portion of Fresno counties stretching from Chowchilla south to the northern vicinity of Fresno and centered around the county seat of Madera. It was established as the nation's 73^{rd}, the state's 43^{rd} and both counties' initial wine appellation on December 7, 1984 by the Bureau of Alcohol, Tobacco and Firearms (ATF), Treasury after reviewing the petition submitted by Mr. David B. Ficklin. President of Ficklin Vineyards, proposing a viticultural area between the Chowchilla and San Joaquin Rivers named "Madera."

The 230,000-acre (359 sq mi) viticultural area cultivates 31,179 acres (12,618 ha) of wine grapes. In the heart of the San Joaquin Valley region of the Central Valley, the AVA produces 10% of all wine grapes grown in the state of California with thirty-three separate varieties grown in Madera County. The county ranks fifth in California acreage of wine grapes, and third in total acres of all grapes with over 68,000 acres (27,519 ha). Due to its hot and dry climate characteristics on which grape growers rely, modern viticulture methods have shown that this region can produce very high quality wines. The area has seen tremendous growth and success due to the shift from high-volume production to high-quality production.

== Name evidence ==
The name "Madera" was well documented in the petition, and supported by written and oral testimony as referring to the viticultural area. Madera is the name of the county and largest city within the viticultural area. Moreover, the name Madera has been associated with local wines since as far back as the 1880s when the Madera Winery supped wines bearing the Madera label to many parts of the world and currently being used by Ficklin Vineyards and Papagni Vineyards to label wines made from area grapes.

Mr. Felix Dias, Commercial Counselor to the Portuguese Embassy, objected to the designation of "Madera." He pointed out possible confusion with the Portuguese island of Madeira which has produced world famous wines for over 500 years and possible confusion with Madeira wine, a class and type of dessert wine. ATF recognized Madeira as a class and type of wine, and as a semi-generic wine designation with geographical significance. When used as a class and type designation, Madeira must be qualified with an appellation of origin if the wine is not from the island of Madeira. Mr. Dias stated use of the term "Madera" would mislead and confuse consumers, and would be unfair to the Portuguese wine industry. In its place, Mr. Dias suggested use of "San Joaquin River Valley" or other similar American appellation for the viticultural area. ATF recognizes the similarity in the names "Madera" and "Madeira." However, all evidence shows that the viticultural area is known locally and nationally as "Madera," thus meeting the requirement of 27 CFR 4,25a(e)(2)(i). Moreover, no evidence was presented that the viticultural area is known as the "San Joaquin River Valley." The term "San Joaquin Valley" refers to a geographical area far larger than the proposed Madera viticultural area. ATF did not see any consumer confusion between Madera and Madeira wines when Madera is used as an appellation of origin on domestic wines. Madera has been used on labels of domestic wines for many years to denote wines from Madera County, California and this has not resulted in consumer confusion, Therefore, ATF recognized the name "Madera" for the viticultural area.

== History ==
A brief look at Madera history clearly reveals a close tie to wine grapes and winemaking. The first vineyards were planted in the 1870s by Judge S.A. Holmes in the town of Madera and the Italian Swiss Colony winery was built in 1870 to process the wine grapes. Later under the ownership of Krikor Arakelian, it was known as Madera Winery. Vintages bearing the "MADERA" label were distributed worldwide and for a time the winery was the largest in the world. The historic adobe Minturn winery operated near Chowchilla between 1890 and 1915 including its 1,000 acres (400 ha) of wine grapes.
In the 1930s, after the Repeal of Prohibition, the Severini and Del Bono families operated wineries south of the town of Madera for many years. In 1946, the Yosemite winery, a farmers' co-op, was founded. This winery was operated by Bruno Bisceglia and had a capacity of 6,000,000 US gallons (22,712,471 L). Also in 1946, Ficklin Vineyards was established making the first commercial plantings of selected Portuguese varieties for the production of premium dessert wine. Ficklin Port is distributed in major national markets bearing the MADERA label.
In the 1980s, three new wineries were established by Angelo Papagni, Paui Masson and Andrew Quady producing millions of gallons or premium vintages bearing the MADERA label. The planting of wine grapes increased dramatically since the 1960s when the area was cultivating 6,510 acres (2,630 ha) of grapes to 31,179 acres (12,618 ha) in 1980.

== Terroir ==
=== Topography ===
The geographical characteristics (climate, soil, elevation, physical features, etc.), distinguishes the viticultural features of the Madera area from the surrounding area. The elevation of the Madera viticultural area increases from west to east, from 130 feet (40 m) above sea level along the San Joaquin River on the west and after gently sloping for 30 miles (48 km) to 390 feet (120 m) on the extreme eastern boundary in Fresno County.

=== Climate ===
Due to the characteristics hot and dry climate of this area, grape growers rely solely on irrigation water from the Sierra Nevada Mountains to the east. Because of the climate, and the availability of irrigation water, grape yield per acre in the proposed area is much larger than in the coastal regions of California. Rainfall throughout the viticultural area is sparse, from 5 to 20 inches (130–510 mm) per year, and averaging 11 or 12 inches (280 or 300 mm) per year in the Madera-Fresno area. This differentiates the viticultural area from the west where rainfall averages 7 to 8 inches (180–200 mm) in the Los Banos-Mendota-Firebaugh areas, and from the east where rainfall is higher averaging 13 to 15 inches (330–380 mm) per year in the Friant-Auberry area. In terms of degree days, Madera averages 4259 degree days according to records kept by the Madera Irrigation District. This contrasts with warmer areas both to the north where Merced averages 4430 degree days, and to the south where Fresno averages 4680 degree days. The growing season in the Madera viticultural area averages between 260 and 270 days, with periodic freezing temperatures during the winter which trigger vine dormancy. To the east in the Fnant-Auberry area, the growing season is 220 days, while to the west in the Los Banos-Mendota-Firebaugh area, the growing season averages 285 or more days per year. Thus, the Madera viticultural area is distinguished from surrounding areas by the length of the growing season. The USDA plant hardiness zones are 9a and 9b.

=== Soils ===
The soils are composed of three major alluvial soil associations; San Joaquin-Madera, Cometa-Whitney and Hanford-Tujunga. These soil associations are all derived primarily from granitic sediments and are moderate to well-drained. The petition stated that the viticultural area contains well drained, non-alkali soils well suited to the cultivation of grapes while the western part of the county, the soils change to a highly alkali type unsuited for grape growing. During the hearing, Steven Ficklin, representing the petitioner, stated that a period of several years of soil treatment would be needed to leach the alkali (high sodium) content of this soil to below the root line of grapes, arid that if the soils were not leached, the alkali content would damage grape vines. Several respondents representing grape growers in western Madera County objected to the exclusion of the western part of the county based on soil. Mr. Robert Smith, a Madera vineyard owner and manager of vineyards in western Madera County, testified that sodium could be leached out of alkaline soils through the application of large amounts of water, such as by irrigation during farming. He also stated this process could be hastened by the application of sulfuric acid or gypsum. Smith testified that the soils in the two vineyards which he manages in western Madera County do not have high sodium levels.

Seven other persons testified during the public hearing that they have grown grapes in the western part of Madera County, some for as long as 25 years. Morgan Johnson, a Madera County grape grower, testified that some of the soil in the western part of the county is neutral and not alkaline. He also testified that drip irrigation could substantially reduce the alkaline content of some soils m one year's time. In post hearing comments, one additional person commented that he is growing grapes in western Madera County. The Bisceglia Brothers Wine Company in Madera also stated that they purchase grapes from western Madera County and that they favor extending the viticultural area into the western part of the county. ATF examined all the evidence presented in written comments, in oral testimony received at the public hearing, and in post-hearing submissions. On the basis of all available evidence, the western boundary of the viticultural area is established as the San Joaquin River, and all of the western portion of Madera County are included. Evidence shows that grapes are grown throughout central and western Madera County, although plantings in the western portion of the county tend to be newer. Also, soil differences exist throughout western and central Madera County, based on a soil map submitted by Steven Ficklin during the public hearing. This map shows large areas of free (non alkaline) soil within the western portion of Madera County; these areas are centered along the north–south boundary, and to the north along the Chowchilla River. The same map also shows substantial areas of intermittent free and saline soils in the western part of the county along the San Joaquin River

Because of these soil types found within western Madera County, it is not possible to characterize all of the soil within this area as highly alkaline. By testimony given during the hearing, vineyards exist in free soils in this area which are identical to soils found in the central part of the county. Therefore, in order to use soils as a basis for the western boundary of the Madera viticultural area, ATF would have to draw very exact boundaries based on soil types. This is impossible due to the lack of any distinguishing geographical features appearing on U.S.G.S. maps covering western Madera County. ATF determined that a geographical feature other than soils should be used to define the western boundary of the viticultural area. This geographical feature is the San Joaquin River, which divides Madera County from Fresno County, and distinguishes the viticultural area from the area to the west which is both drier and has a longer growing season.
