= Madera Unified School District =

School district in Madera County, California

Address
- 1902 Howard Road Madera, California, 93637; United States

District information
- Type: Public
- Motto: Madera Unified is where students are challenged to broaden their vision, inspired by meaningful opportunities and strive for authentic achievements.
- Grades: K–12
- Established: 1966
- Superintendent: Todd Lile
- NCES District ID: 0623340

Students and staff
- Students: 19,941 (2020–2021)
- Teachers: 914.2 (FTE)
- Staff: 1,017.98 (FTE)
- Student–teacher ratio: 21.81:1

Other information
- Website: www.maderausd.org

Madera Unified School District is a public school district serving Madera, California.

== History ==
The district was first incorporated in 1966 to consolidate the administration of schools in and around the City of Madera. The district has 28 schools (14 K-6 elementary schools, 4 K-8 country schools, 3 middle schools, 2 high schools, 2 alternative education centers, one adult school, and a preschool program). In recent years, M.U.S.D has added 7 new schools (4 elementary schools and 1 middle school) and completed two high schools: Madera South High School (formerly Madera High School - South Campus) and Matilda Torres High School.

=== Voting Rights Act lawsuit ===
Madera Unified's capitulation when faced with a 2008 lawsuit about how school board trustees were elected, as well as a judge's related ruling on the matter, has reportedly influenced other California school districts and other governmental bodies to change from at-large representation, which dominates the state's school districts, to a by-district system. Four Madera plaintiffs, represented by the San Francisco-based Lawyers' Committee for Civil Rights, alleged that the at-large voting system resulted in racial polarization that resulted in the city's Latino majority of 82 percent being politically marginalized, which they said violated the state's 2002 Voting Rights Act. However, that statistic is slightly misleading, as only 44 percent of those eligible to vote in a MUSD election were Latinos, according to a press release by Anayma DeFrias of the LCCR mentioned above. The Madera case was one of the first to be filed under the California Voting Rights Act. The school district settled out of court without admitting guilt but agreeing to change how school board trustees were elected, according to The Madera Tribune daily newspaper in 2008.

=== Recent superintendents ===
The Madera Unified School Board placed Superintendent John Stafford on leave with pay for the remainder of the 2010-11 school year. No reason was given. After a short search, a new superintendent, Gustavo Balderas, was hired 2011 on a three-year contract. Balderas surprised the district by resigning to take another superintendent position in Southern California in 2012. During the search for a replacement for Balderas, accusations were made of improper conduct by several board members regarding the search. That search was aborted, and an investigation was launched. In the meantime, the board rehired former superintendent Julie O'Kane as interim. In July 2013, it was announced that Ed Gonzales, a former teacher and principal at Madera Unified, had been hired as superintendent.

== Schools ==
=== Elementary schools ===
- John Adams Elementary School
- Alpha Elementary School
- Berenda Elementary School
- Caesar E. Chavez Elementary School
- Eastin-Arcola Elementary School
- Lincoln Elementary School
- James Madison Elementary School
- Millview Elementary School
- James Monroe Elementary School
- Nishimoto Elementary School
- Parkwood Elementary School
- John J. Pershing Elementary School
- Sierra Vista Elementary School
- George Washington Elementary School
- Virginia Lee Rose Elementary School

=== Middle schools ===
- Jack G. Desmond Middle School
- Martin Luther King Jr, Middle School
- Thomas Jefferson Middle School

=== High schools ===
- Madera High School
- Madera South High School
- Matilda Torres High School

=== K-8 schools ===
- Dixieland School
- Howard School
- King Hussein School
- La Vina School
- Eastin Arcola

=== Alternative education ===
- Furman High School
- Adult Education
- Ripperdan Community Day School
