= Duncan Polytechnical High School =

Public high school in Fresno, California, US

Coordinates: 36°47′3.85″N 119°45′4.35″W

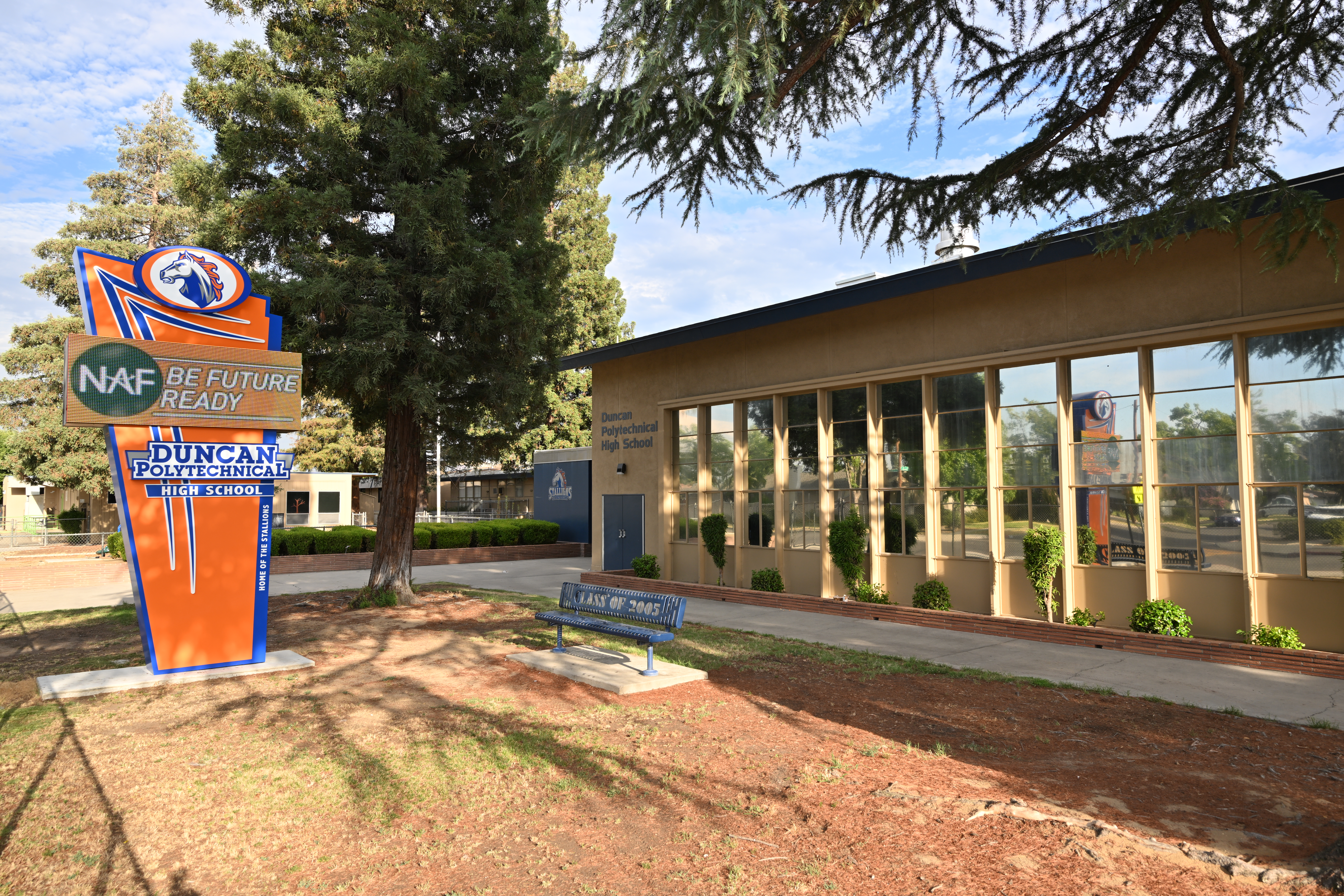
- 4330 E Garland Avenue; Fresno, California 93726

Information
- Type: Public high school, Magnet School
- Established: 1980
- School district: Fresno Unified School District
- Principal: Eric Martinez
- Staff: 62.31 (FTE)
- Grades: 9–12
- Enrollment: 1,186 (2023-2024)
- Student to teacher ratio: 19.03
- Colors: Royal and Orange
- Team name: Stallions
- Information: 559-248-7080 (Phone)
- Website: https://duncan.fresnounified.org/

Erma Duncan Polytechnical High School is a public high school located in Fresno, California, United States, as part of the Fresno Unified School District. Duncan Polytechnical High School spans grades 9 through 12, providing agricultural education for gifted students. The school obtained, together with California State University at Fresno, significant research grants from the US government.

Founded 1980, the school colors are royal and orange. It is a career pathways high school that offers the following certifications: Medical Academy of Science and Health (MASH); The Innovative Design and Applied Technology Academy (IDATA)

As of the 2021–2022 school year, the school had an enrollment of 1,191 students and 61.04 classroom teachers (on an FTE basis), for a student-teacher ratio of 19.51. There are 599 male students and 592 female students

Duncan has numerous career technical education (CTE) courses with students traveling from all over the district to attend. These courses include: small automotive, construction, advanced manufacturing, nursing services, physical therapy, rehabilitation therapy, and welding/fabrication

In November 2022, the school acquired a Mack LR Electric truck so students in the Innovative Design and Applied Technology Academy Medium/Heavy truck technology pathway will have up-to-date equipment to learn on.

In January 2023, the school opened new Medical Academy of Science and Health building which will allow it to expand enrollment in the MASH program above 600 and have facilities that more closely match real-world settings.

== Clubs and athletics ==
Duncan has over 20 clubs for students including Ski and Snowboard club, League of Legends (gaming) club, and a Guitar club. Athletics include basketball, indoor soccer, ultimate frisbee, and volleyball.

== Sources ==
- Dixon, F.A.; Moon, S.M. (2021). The Handbook of Secondary Gifted Education. Taylor & Francis. ISBN 978-1-000-48962-0.
