= Fresno Unified School District =

School district in California, United States

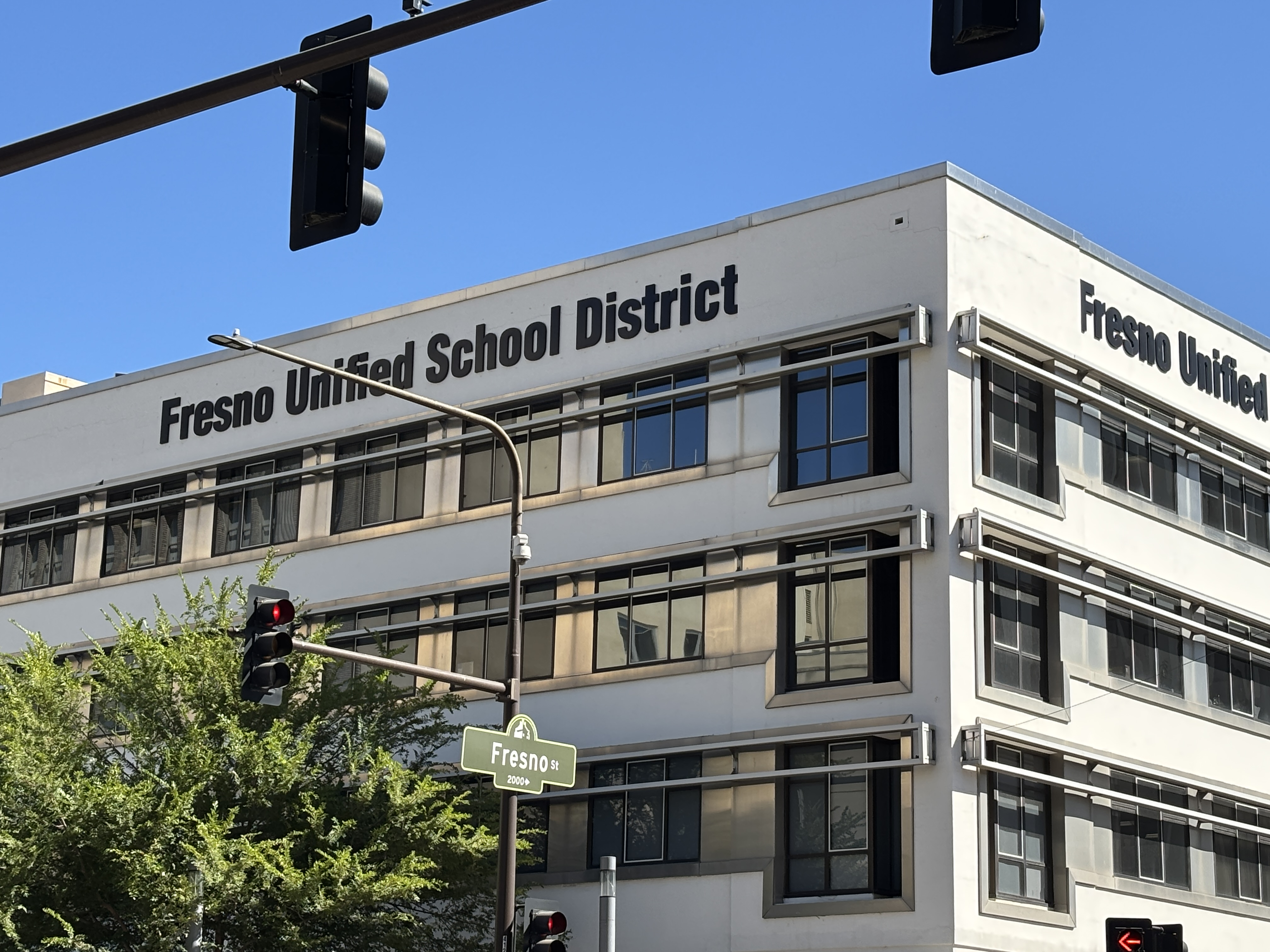
- 2309 Tulare Street Fresno, CA, 93721

District information
- Motto: Preparing College and Career Ready Graduates
- Grades: PK-12
- Established: 1873
- Superintendent: Misty Her
- School board: Susan Wittrup, President; Valerie F. Davis, Clerk; Keshia Thomas; Elizabeth Jonasson Rosas; Veva Islas; Andy Levine; Claudia Cazares
- Schools: 106
- Budget: $1,640,324,652
- Enrollment: 73,000

Other information
- Website: http://www.fresnounified.org

The Fresno Unified School District is a school district in Fresno, California, United States.

The district includes most of Fresno. It also includes Calwa, Mayfair, Old Fig Garden, most of Sunnyside, and a portion of Clovis.

== Facts and figures ==
- California's third largest school district
- 74,000 students
- $1.6 Billion Budget
- 76 different languages represented over the last five years
- 1,575 children attend preschool
- 25,400 adults attend adult education classes

== Administration ==
=== Superintendent ===
- Misty Her, Superintendent

=== Board of Education ===
- Susan Wittrup, President
- Valerie F. Davis, Clerk
- Keshia Thomas
- Elizabeth Jonasson Rosas
- Veva Islas
- Andy Levine
- Claudia Cazares

== Schools ==
=== High schools ===
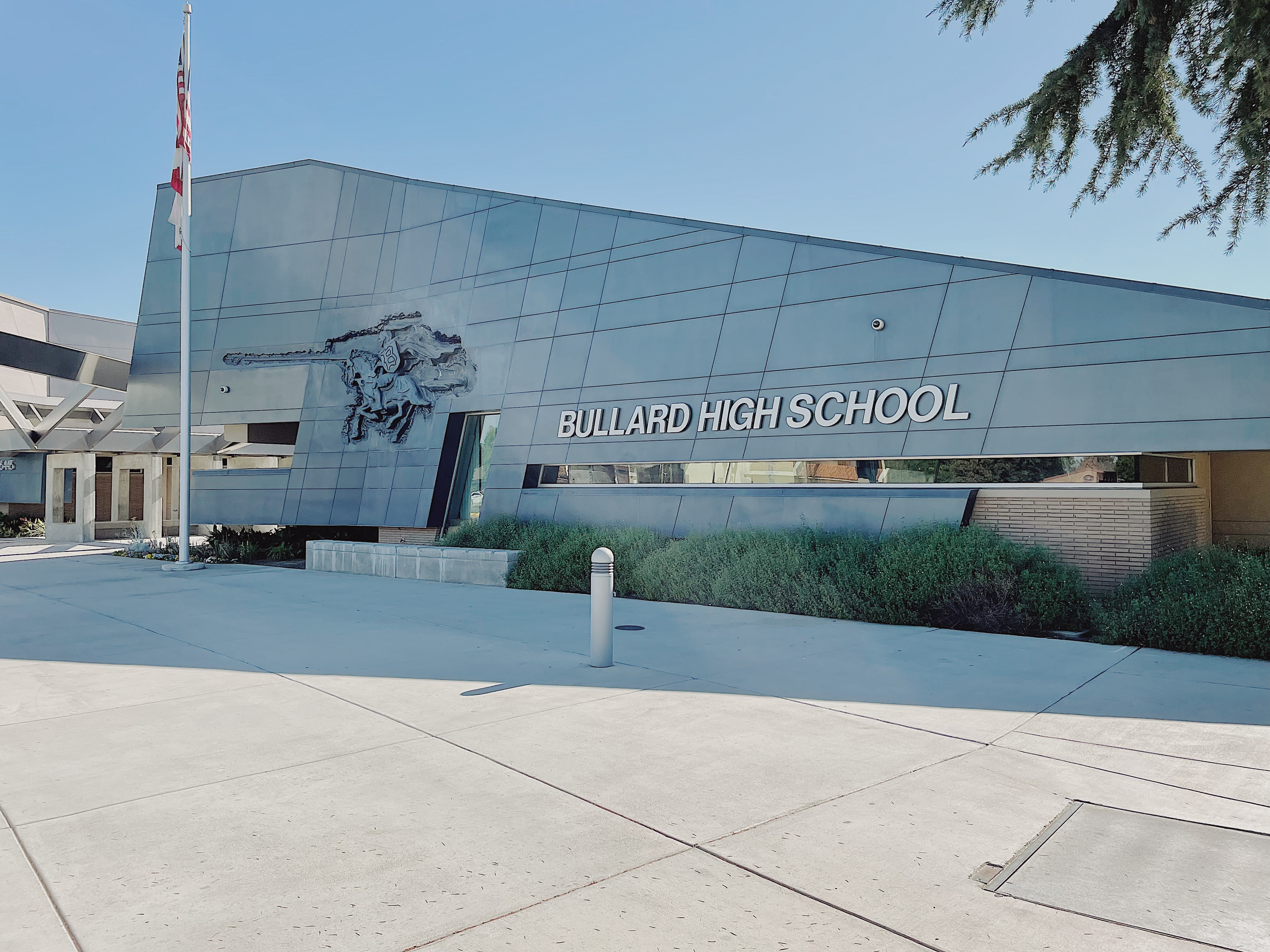
Bullard High School

- Philip J. Patino High School of Entrepreneurship
- Bullard High School
- The Center for Advanced Research and Technology
- Design Science High School
- Duncan Polytechnical High School
- Edison High School
- Fresno High School
- Hoover High School
- McLane High School
- Roosevelt High School
- Sunnyside High School

=== Middle Schools ===
- Ahwahnee Middle School
- Baird Middle School
- Bullard Talent K-8 Middle School
- Computech Middle School
- Cooper Academy
- Fort Miller Middle School
- Hamilton K-8 Middle School
- Kings Canyon Middle School
- Gaston Middle School
- Scandinavian Middle School
- Sequoia Middle School
- Tehipite Middle School
- Tenaya Middle School
- Terronez Middle School
- Tioga Middle School
- Wawona K-8 School
- Yosemite Middle School

=== Elementary Schools ===
- Addams Elementary School
- Addicot Elementary School
- Anthony Elementary School
- Ayer Elementary School
- Aynesworth Elementary School
- Bakman Elementary School
- Balderas Elementary School
- Birney Elementary School
- Bullard TALENT Elementary School
- Burroughs Elementary School
- Calwa Elementary School
- Centennial Elementary School
- Columbia Elementary School
- Dailey Elementary School (Charter School)
- Del Mar Elementary School
- Easterby Elementary School
- Eaton Elementary School
- Edison Bethune Charter School
- Ericson Elementary School
- Ewing Elementary School
- Figarden Elementary School
- Tatarian Elementary School
- Fremont Elementary School
- Gibson Elementary School
- Greenberg Elementary School
- Heaton Elementary School
- Herrera Elementary School
- Hidalgo Elementary School
- Holland Elementary School
- Homan Elementary School
- Jackson Elementary School
- Jefferson Elementary School
- King Elementary School
- Kirk Elementary School
- Kratt Elementary School
- Lane Elementary School
- Lawless Elementary School
- Leavenworth Elementary School
- Lincoln Elementary School
- Lowell Elementary School
- Malloch Elementary School
- Manchester GATE Elementary School
- Mayfair Elementary School
- McCardle Elementary School
- Muir Elementary School
- Norseman Elementary School
- Olmos Elementary School
- Powers-Ginsburg Elementary School
- Pyle Elementary School
- Robinson Elementary School
- Roeding Elementary School
- Rowell Elementary School
- Slater Elementary School
- Starr Elementary School
- Storey Elementary School
- Sunset Elementary School
- Thomas Elementary School
- Turner Elementary School
- Vang Pao Elementary School
- Viking Elementary School
- Vinland Elementary School
- Webster Elementary School
- Williams Elementary School
- Wilson Elementary School
- Winchell Elementary School
- Wishon Elementary School
- Wolters Elementary School
- Yokomi Elementary School

=== Alternative Schools ===
- Cambridge Cont. High School
- DeWolf Cont. High School
- eLearn Academy
- J.E. Young Academic Center
- Phoenix Academy
- Phoenix Secondary

=== Adult Schools ===
- Cesar E. Chavez Adult School

== Notable alumni ==
- Henry Ellard (Hoover High School class of 1979) — athlete
- Robert Golden (Edison High School class of 2008) - athlete
- Cliff Harris (Cooper Middle School Class of 2005) — athlete
- John Hoover (Cooper Junior High School Class of 1977) — athlete pro baseball player
- Eric Kendricks (Hoover High School class of 2010) - athlete
- Mychal Kendricks (Hoover High School class of 2008) — athlete
- Barbara Morgan (Hoover High School class of 1969) — NASA astronaut
- Rod Perry (Hoover High School class of 1971) — athlete

== See also ==
- List of school districts in Fresno County, California
- Long Range School Site Location Plan: PROJECT DESIGN. Interagency Planning for Urban Educational Needs, Number 36
