= Mike Pronovost =

- Born: November 11, 1989 (age 36); Fresno, California, United States

Mike Pronovost (born November 11, 1989) is an American Internet entrepreneur and founder and CEO of Powerband and Pronovost Technologies. He was invited to the White House where he spoke about entrepreneurship.

== Early life ==
Pronovost was born in Fresno, California, in 1989. He attended St. Anthony's Elementary School in Fresno, California, until May 2004. He then attended high school at the private San Joaquin Memorial High School, from which he graduated in 2008. After graduating, he attended Fresno City College in the Leon S. Peters Honors Program. He then transferred to California State University, Fresno.

== Career ==
Pronovost launched Powerband from his home while he was in high school. Powerband is a high speed internet technology that promised "ultra-fast Internet speeds". Pronovost had some backing for the company from Microsoft.

In 2009, Pronovost launched Pronovost Technologies, an umbrella company.

== Honors ==
In November 2011, he was invited to the White House where he gave a speech encouraging youth entrepreneurship around the country.

In 2012 the Fresno Chamber of Commerce named him the 2012 College Entrepreneur of the Year.
