= Central High School (Fresno, California) =

Public secondary school in Fresno, California, United States

Coordinates: 36°45′54″N 119°58′16″W

- 2045 N Dickenson Ave, Fresno, CA 93723

Information
- Type: Public
- Established: 1922
- School district: Central Unified School District
- Principal: Brad Edmons
- Grades: 9-12
- Colors: Orange, gray, and white
- Mascot: Central Grizzlies
- Website: https://chs.centralunified.org/

Central East High School is a multi-campus high school located in Fresno, California. The first campus of the former multi campus school and is known as the West Campus, it erected in 1922. The second campus, called the East Campus, opened its doors to students in August 1996. Central East High serves grades 9-12 and is part of the Central Unified School District.

For the 2025–2026 school year, Central East & Central High Schools have split into their own campuses, with Central keeping the Grizzly, and East switching to the Bengal Tiger. Justin Garza High gets no change.

== History ==
On March 1, 1922, the Central Union High School District was formed. Newly elected board members from the elementary schools had met earlier that year with Walter G. Martin, who would become the new principal. A piece of property on the corner of McKinley Ave. and Dickenson Ave. was purchased from the Charles Mutchler family, which operated a 120-acre farm and dairy at that location. In October of that same year, Central Union High School opened for its first term in two temporary buildings. It had four teachers, including principal W.G. Martin, who taught history. Ward R. Miles taught plane geometry, general science, biology and physical education, Maude Starbuck taught algebra, Latin and English, and Darlene McAllister taught Spanish, English, and physical education. Student enrollment was 70 students. By the end of the first school year, enrollment was close to 100 students. By 1923, construction of a permanent building began. It was considered to be the largest high school in California. It was a two-story brick and stucco building, containing approximately 20 classrooms, a library, offices, and a 750 seat-capacity auditorium. On November 27, 1923, the new Central Union High School building was formally dedicated and opened to the public. In honor of the occasion, the school board secured an invitation to the State Superintendent of Public Instruction, Will C. Wood, to deliver a short address at the dedication ceremony

Facing the near capacity situation at the West Campus, as well as the increase in enrollment in the following years, the Central Unified School Board approved the construction of another high school campus. The campus was built on 60 acres on the northwest corner of Dakota Ave. and Cornelia Ave. The campus officially welcomed its students during the 1996–1997 school year. Much controversy came from which students would attend which campus or if students would be divided and attend both schools. Originally all freshmen students were required to attend West Campus while sophomore, junior, and senior students had the option to go to East Campus, or stay at West campus. However, with the steady increase in freshmen students every year, the district decided to let freshman choose to go to either West Campus or East Campus. However, freshman attending East Campus must enroll in one of four of the career academies on Campus. Enrollment in either of the academies requires a four-year commitment to East Campus.

== Athletics ==
Central East is part of the CIF Central Section and competes in the Tri-River-Athletic-Conference (TRAC) in all sports with Buchanan, Clovis High School, Clovis East, Clovis North and Clovis West.

- Girls Basketball 2023 Division II NorCal
- CIF State Championships (5)
- 2020 CIF Division III State Wrestling Dual Championship
- 2023 CIF Division II Girls Basketball.

== Notable alumni ==
- Keith Hartwig (1971), former NFL wide receiver
- Carter Hartwig (1975), former NFL defensive back
- Courtney Griffin (1984), former NFL defensive back
- Tom Goodwin (1986), former MLB outfielder and coach
- Marcus Walden (2006), former MLB pitcher
- Layla Diggs (2016), WWE professional wrestler
- Jaylon Johnson (2017), All-pro cornerback for the Chicago Bears
- Quali Conley (2020), CFL running back
- Jeremiah Hunter (2020), CFL wide receiver
- Cedric Coward (2021), Shooting Guard for the Memphis Grizzlies
- Xavier Worthy (2021), wide receiver for the Kansas City Chiefs
