= Edison High School (Fresno, California) =

Public high school in California, United States

Coordinates: 36°43′11.6″N 119°48′20.3″W

- 540 E. California Avenue; Fresno, California 93706

Information
- Type: Public high school, Magnet School
- Motto: One Tiger, Many Stripes
- Established: c. 1906
- School district: Fresno Unified School District
- Principal: Joey Muñoz
- Teaching staff: 108.76 (on FTE basis)
- Grades: 9–12
- Enrollment: 2,339 (2023–2024)
- Student to teacher ratio: 21.51
- Colors: Black and Gold
- Athletics conference: County Metro League
- Team name: Tigers
- Website: https://edison.fresnounified.org/

Edison High School is located in Fresno, California, United States, as part of the Fresno Unified School District. It is a public high school located next to Computech Middle School. Edison serves students from grade 9 to 12.

Founded c. 1906, the school was first named Edison Technical High School until a major renovation in the 1960s, when the name became the current Edison High School. In 1982–1983, Irwin Junior High School, located adjacent Edison High School was finally integrated by 1985, forming a larger campus; Edison Computech High School.

It is currently a magnet school in the academic areas of math and science. Academically, it is one of the highest ranked schools in the San Joaquin Valley. It is also competitively ranked among the highest on an academic level among all high schools in the State of California. The school integrates underperforming neighborhood students with magnet students.

As of the 2024–2025 school year, the school had an enrollment of 2,339 students and 108.76 classroom teachers (on an FTE basis), for a student-teacher ratio of 21.51.

== Awards and recognition ==
Edison High School has been consistently recognized as one of the country's top high schools in Newsweek magazine's rankings since their inception, which are based on the number of Advanced Placement (AP) exams. On May 13, 2011, Edison has created an all-time state record of the most students taking the AP Human Geography Exam at one time. The school has been ranked #79 in the 1998 listing, #83 in 2000, #166 in 2003 and #331 in 2005.

- The school was recognized by the California State Board of Education as a California Distinguished School in 2001. The school was also honored with the award in 1990 and 1992, and again in 2007.
- The Boys Basketball program holds State Record 23 Section Titles, with their last section title in 2015.

== Extracurricular activities ==
In 2009, the school's Academic Decathlon team had its historic run of 13 consecutive titles of the Fresno County Academic Decathlon competition ended. They have since managed to win one title.

In 2007, the National Forensic League recognized the school's forensic team with its "Leading Chapter Award".

== Notable alumni ==
- Young Corbett III (1905–1993), boxer, Welterweight and Middleweight champion.
- Marvin X (1944-) born Marvin Ellis Jackmon, poet, playwright, essayist.
- Sherley Anne Williams (1944–1999) African American poet, novelist, professor, social critic
- Ervin Hunt (1947–), former Green Bay Packers defensive back and U.S. Olympic track team head coach, 1996 Atlanta Olympics
- Donald Slade (1947–), former San Joaquin Valley Player of the Year in basketball 1965, Director of Basketball Operations for Fresno State University
- Charle Young (1951–), former NFL tight end, NFL Rookie of the Year, All Pro. and Super Bowl champion
- Greg Boyd (1952–), former NFL defensive end with New England Patriots, Denver Broncos, San Francisco 49ers and Green Bay Packers and Super Bowl champion
- Randy Williams (1953-), 1972 Olympic gold medalist in the long jump at 1972 Munich Olympics and silver medalist at 1976 Montreal Olympics
- Joe Henderson (1947-), former professional baseball player for Chicago White Sox and Cincinnati Reds.
- Jarvis Tatum (1947–2003), former professional baseball player for the California Angels
- Elbert "Ickey" Woods (1966-), former running back for Cincinnati Bengals; notable for performing the "Ickey Shuffle"
- Tim McDonald (1965-), NFL strong safety for Phoenix Cardinals and San Francisco 49ers and Super Bowl champion
- Bruce Bowen (1971-), retired small forward for NBA's San Antonio Spurs was a 3 time NBA champion; television sports commentator
- Planet Asia (1976-), underground hip-hop artist
- Joaquin Arambula (1977-), emergency room physician and Democratic politician in California State Assembly representing 31st State Assembly district
- Ricky Manning, Jr. (1980-), cornerback for St. Louis Rams; varsity football coach at Edison High School in 2012
- Clifton Smith (1985-), All Pro kickoff/punt returner for Tampa Bay Buccaneers
- Cliff Harris (cornerback) (1991-), former University of Oregon football star and Philadelphia Eagles draft pick
- T. J. McDonald (1991-), defensive back for St. Louis Rams, son of former NFL player Tim McDonald, graduate of USC and Edison
- Villyan Bijev (1993-), professional soccer player signed to FC Liverpool of England's Premier League
- Greg Smith (1991-), professional basketball player for Houston Rockets
- Jay Obernolte (1970-), owner of FarSight Studios, and Republican politician in US Congress representing California's 8th Congressional District
- Ryan Braun (1980-), former professional baseball player for Kansas City Royals
- Lolly Vegas, member of the band Redbone
- KC Chandler, contestant on Season 8 of Love Island USA.
