= McLane High School =

Public high school in Fresno, California, US

Coordinates: 36°46′28.5″N 119°45′22.4″W

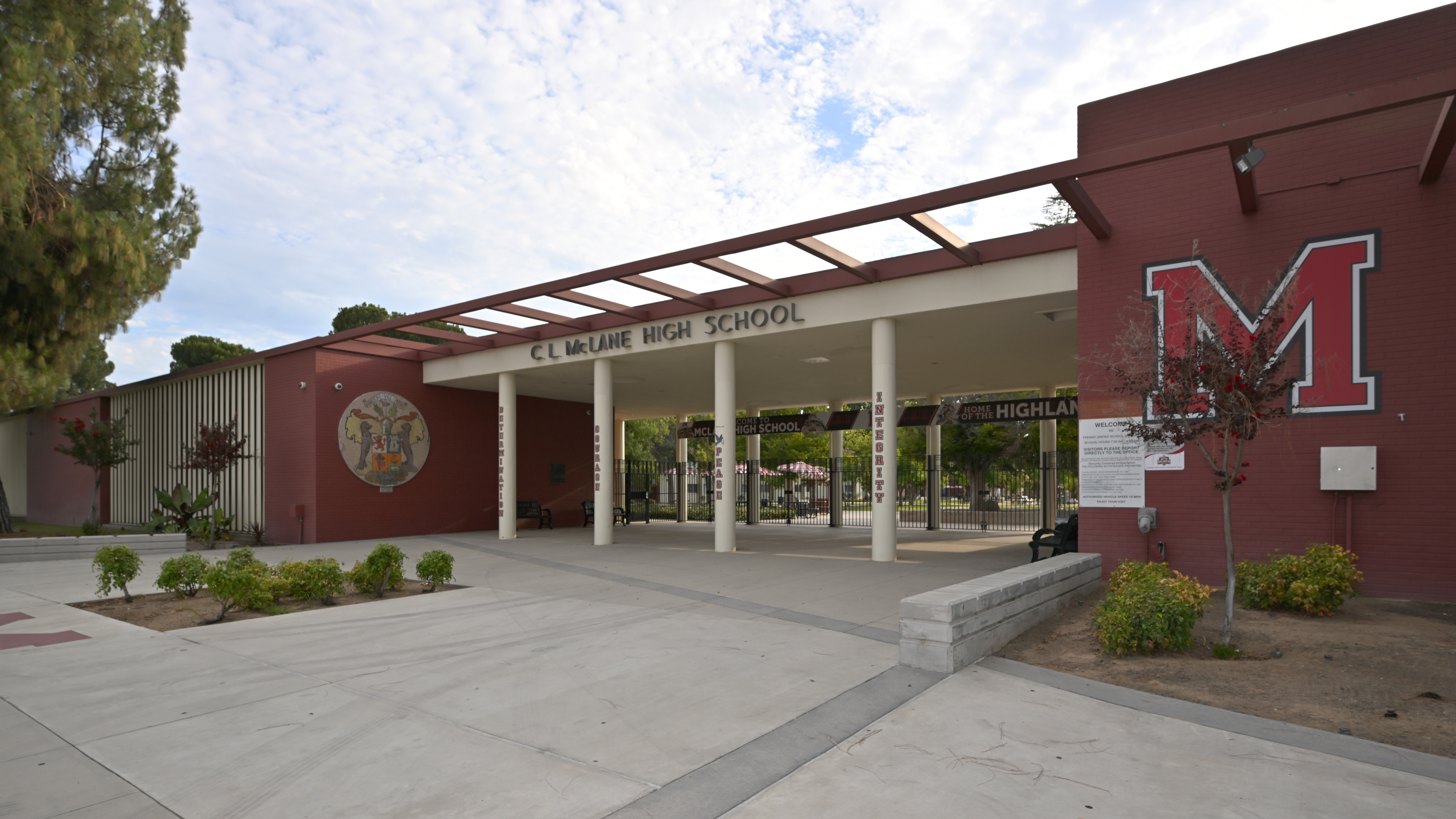

Location
- 2727 N. Cedar Avenue; Fresno, California 93703

Information
- School type: Public
- Founded: 1959
- School district: Fresno Unified School District
- Teaching staff: 99.09 (FTE)
- Enrollment: 2,045 (2023-2024)
- Student to teacher ratio: 20.64
- Colors: Red, white and gray
- Team name: Highlanders
- Website: mclane.fresnounified.org

McLane High School is a 9-12 public high school in Fresno, California, United States. Located at the corner of Cedar and Clinton, it is part of the Fresno Unified School District.

== Programs and activities ==
Advancement Via Individual Determination (AVID) is a program at McLane that helps students to be organized and prepares them for college. AVID is a community support system which provides tutoring, career planning and mentoring.

The Jason Esquivel Mural Program was established by the district to teach and promote art in 2021. During the first two summers, the program had six schools where murals were painted by the students and artists. The mural at McLane symbolized unity, community, kindness and togetherness. The design had been pre-approved by a school administrator as part of a summer school arts program. The students and local artist Naomi Marie Guzman with other artists collaborated each morning for a week in July, finishing with their handprints and signatures on the mural. Within two weeks the mural had been painted over by the district without consultation or explanation.

== Notable students and alumni ==
- Victor Conte - BALCO founder
- Bill Glasson - PGA Tour golfer
- Vestee Jackson - cornerback, Chicago Bears
- David St. John - poet
- Joanna Kerns - actress from Growing Pains
- Larry Mucker - class of 1973, wide receiver, Tampa Bay Buccaneers
- Jason Wood - Major League Baseball player, minor-league manager
- Warren Zevon - singer/songwriter
