= Madera High School =

High school in Madera, California

- Location in the state of California

Location
- 200 South L Street; Madera, Madera County, California 93637; United States; 36.9541°N 120.0656°W

Information
- Motto: Home of the Coyotes
- Established: 1894
- School district: Madera Unified School District
- Principal: Robyn Cosgrove
- Teaching staff: 73.53 (FTE)
- Grades: 9-12
- Age range: 13-18
- Enrollment: 1,865 (2023–2024)
- Student to teacher ratio: 25.36
- Hours in school day: 8
- Colors: Blue & White
- Fight song: All Hail Madera
- Athletics conference: County Metro Athletic Conference
- Mascot: Coyote
- Rival: Madera South Stallions
- Publication: 1894
- Newspaper: The Maderan
- Yearbook: The Blue & White
- Website: mhs.maderausd.org

Madera High School is the first school and original high school in the central San Joaquin Valley city of Madera, California, serving students since 1894. The school colors are royal blue & white and its mascot is the coyote.

== History ==
Madera High School's layout has been changed over the years. Originally, a brick schoolhouse served as MHS; this was destroyed in a fire in the early 1900s. In 1907 a new similarly styled brick building—nicknamed the "Main Building"—was constructed. Soon, more buildings began appearing. In 1976, the "Main Building" was demolished, because it did not meet earthquake standards; the area where it was located is now known as "The Pit" and is the hub for lunchtime activities. By 2000, the school's current layout had been completed. In 2004, the main office building was refurbished, and most of the school followed suit in 2006.

The school's original colors were purple and white. In 1949, with the color purple becoming scarce after the events of World War II, it was changed to its current royal blue & white color scheme.

From 1902 to 1966 the school was officially named Madera Union High School.

In 1989, the Madera Unified School District commissioned the building of a new, separate high school; overcrowding at MHS was the main reason for this. Construction began in 1990, but the project was brought to an abrupt end in 1992, for budget reasons. Because the site was not big enough to be considered a stand-alone high school, the campus was renamed "South Campus," and served as the second half of Madera High School. The original flagship campus was nicknamed "North Campus" as a result. However, the November 2002 passing of a school bond allowed South Campus to be completed, and as renovations at North Campus were underway, the new Madera South High School opened its doors in August 2006. The last "mega class" of Madera High graduated in 2008, being the largest graduating class in MHS history.

== Athletics ==
Madera High School offers many athletic opportunities.

- Fall Sports:
  - Cross Country
  - Football
  - Girls Golf
  - Girls Tennis
  - Girls Volleyball
  - Gymnastics
  - Water Polo
  - Cheer & Dance
- Winter Sports:
  - Basketball
  - Soccer
  - Wrestling
  - Cheer & Dance
- Spring Sports:
  - Baseball
  - Boys Golf
  - Softball
  - Boys Tennis
  - Swimming
  - Track & Field
  - Boys Volleyball

== Stadium Road Showdown ==
Since the official split of the two schools, Madera High School and Madera South High School have been rivals. In 2008, the first annual Stadium Road Showdown game was played, named for the street that connects both schools. The winning team is awarded a giant "saw," in reference to Madera's roots as a lumber town.

Scoreboard

- 2008 - Madera High 35-0
- 2009 - Madera High 14-13
- 2010 - Madera High 45-28
- 2011 - Madera South 14-3
- 2012 - Madera High 48-30
- 2013 - Madera High 48-7
- 2014 - Madera High 32-31 (OT)
- 2015 - Madera South 55-36
- 2016 - Madera South 49-35
- 2017 - Madera High 49-20
- 2018 - Madera High 21-16
- 2019 - Madera High 28-7
- 2020 - Madera High 35-28 (played in Spring 2021 due to COVID-19)

== Feeder Schools ==
The schools that directly feed into Madera High are Thomas Jefferson Middle School, Howard K-8 School, and Dixieland K-8 School.

The elementary schools that feed into Thomas Jefferson Middle School are: John Adams Elementary School, Alpha Elementary School (west and north), Lincoln Elementary School, Madison Elementary School, and George Washington Elementary School.

== Notable Alumni and Faculty ==
- Dwayne Crump - Professional football player for the St. Louis Cardinals.
- Zoila Gurgel - Professional female mixed martial artist, Won the Bellator Women's 115 lb Championship
- Lavar Johnson - football player; current MMA fighter for Bellator Fighting Championship
- La Schelle Tarver - Professional baseball player with the Boston Red Sox.
- LeRoy Zimmerman - Taught from 1955 - 1981. Was an All-Pro professional football player and a Hall of Fame softball pitcher.
