= Madera, California =

City in California, United States

- City
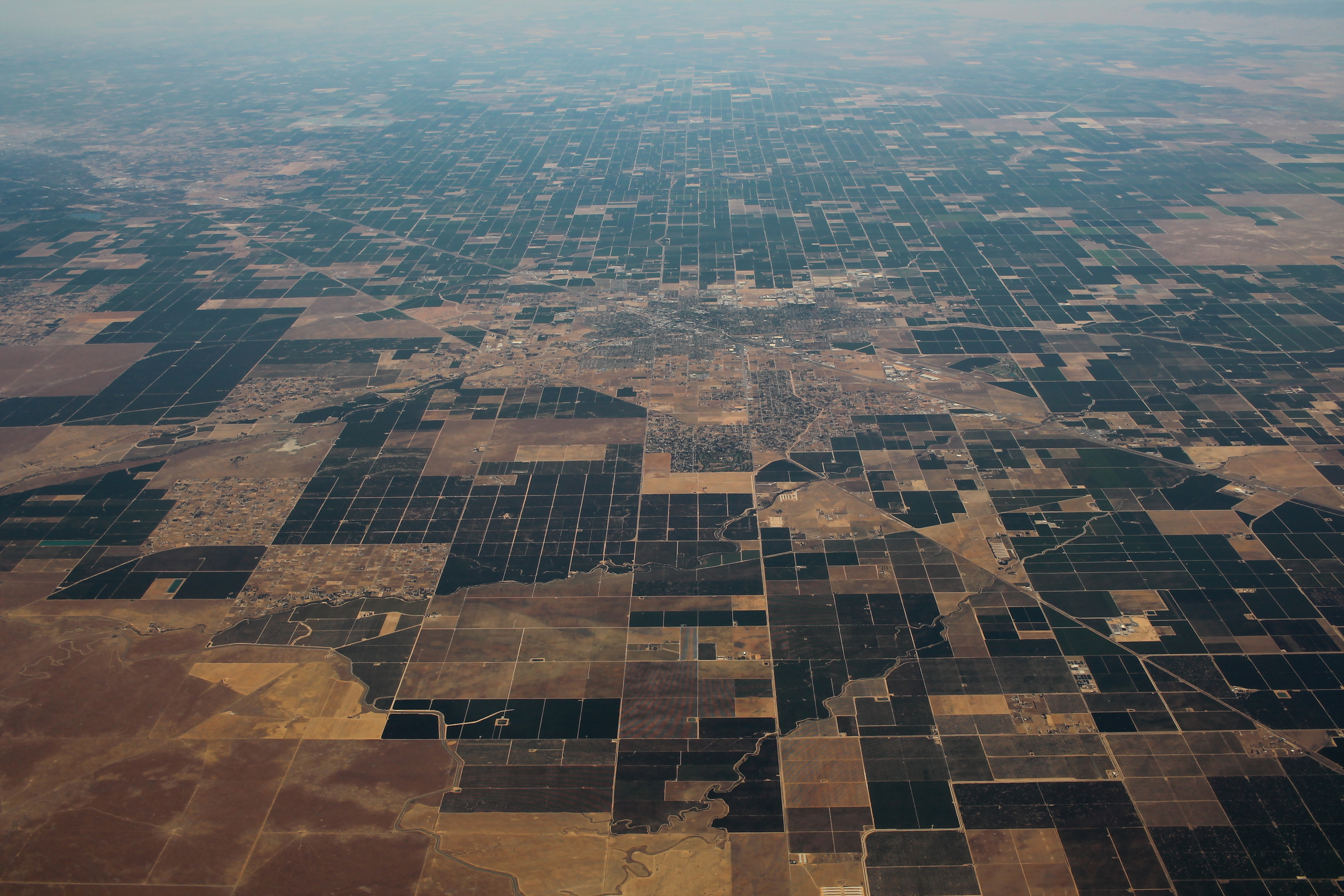
- Aerial view of Madera
- Nickname: "The Heart of California"
- Interactive map of Madera, California
- Location in California Madera, California (the United States)
- Coordinates: 36°57′41″N 120°03′39″W
- Country: United States
- State: California
- County: Madera
- Region: Central Valley; Northern California
- Incorporated: March 27, 1907

Government
  - Type: Council–manager
  - City council: Mayor Cece Gallegos * Rohi Zacharia (D1) * Jose Rodriguez (D2) * Steve Montes (D3) * Anita Evans (D4) * Elsa Mejía (D5) * Artemio Villegas (D6)
  - City Manager: Arnoldo Rodriguez

Area
  - City: 16.47 sq mi (42.67 km^{2})
  - Land: 16.47 sq mi (42.67 km^{2})
  - Water: 0 sq mi (0.00 km^{2}) 0%
- Elevation: 272 ft (83 m)

Population (2020)
  - City: 66,224
  - Density: 4,020/sq mi (1,552/km^{2})
  - Metro: 152,465
- Demonym: Maderan
- Time zone: UTC−8 (Pacific)
  - Summer (DST): UTC−7 (PDT)
- ZIP Code: 93636–93639
- Area code: 559
- FIPS code: 06-45022
- GNIS feature IDs: 277552, 2410906
- Website: www.madera.gov

Madera (Spanish for "lumber") is a city in and the county seat of Madera County, located in the San Joaquin Valley of California, United States. Founded in 1876 as a timber settlement at the terminus of a major log flume, the city grew around the lumber trade before transitioning to an agriculture-based economy during the 20th century. Irrigation from the San Joaquin River and nearby canals transformed the surrounding plains into fertile farmland that now supports vineyards, nut orchards, and row crops.

As of the 2020 United States census, Madera had a population of 66,224.

== History ==
=== Early Beginnings and the Lumber Era (1876–1931) ===
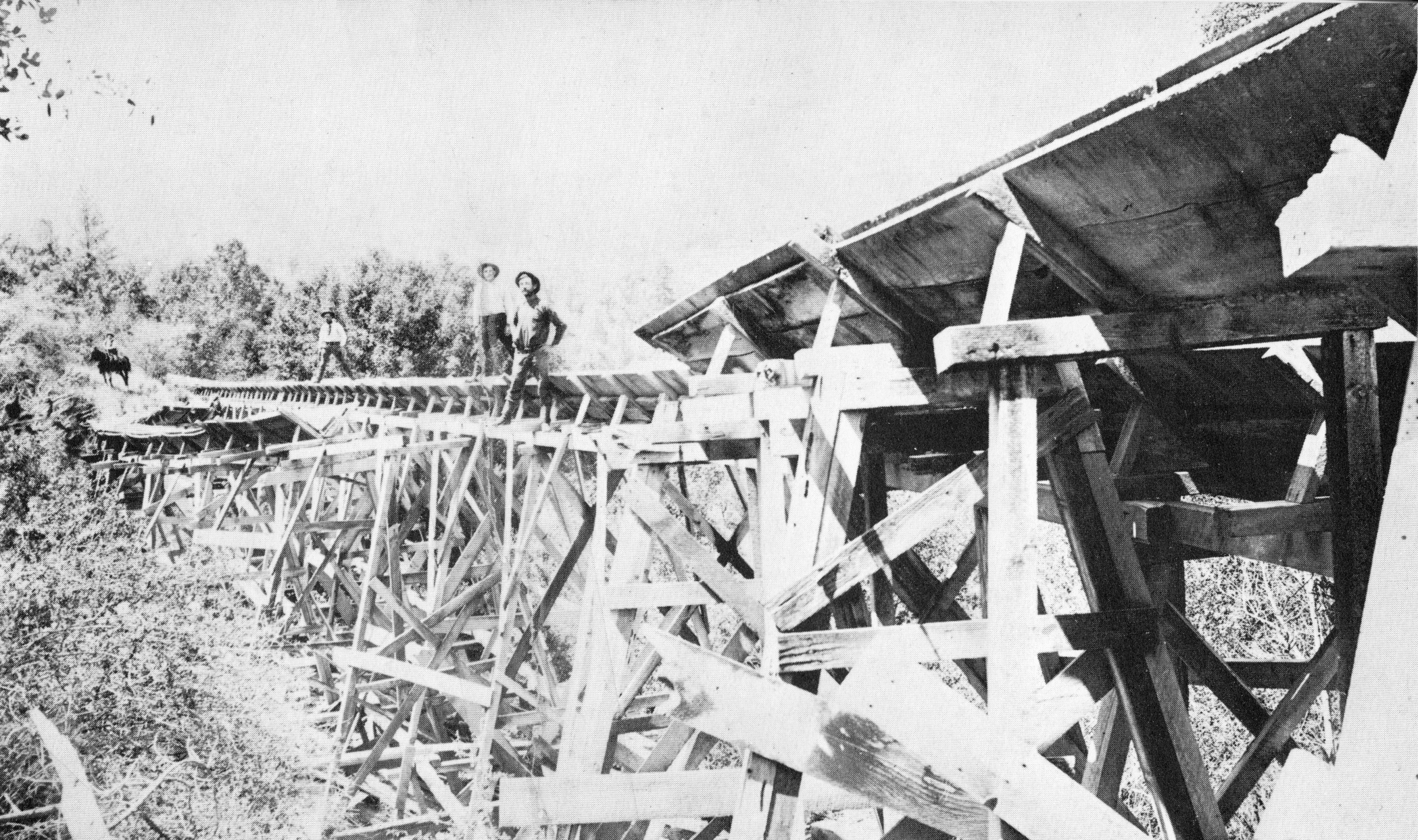
The original Madera log flume.

Madera was founded in 1876 as a lumber town at the terminus of a flume constructed by the California Lumber Company. The town's name, meaning "wood" in Spanish, reflected its timber-based economy.

In October 1876, company president William H. Thurman auctioned the first town lots, and Capt. Russell Perry Mace erected Madera's first building—the Yosemite Hotel—to serve travelers bound for Yosemite Valley. A sixty-mile wooden V-flume carried rough-cut lumber from sawmills in the Sierra Nevada to Madera's railroad planing mill. The first boards traveled the flume in 1877, the same year Madera's post office opened.

That same year's drought dried the flume and left unsold lumber stacked in the yards, forcing the California Lumber Company into bankruptcy by 1878. Banker Return Roberts of San Jose acquired the assets and reorganized them as the Madera Flume and Trading Company, which revived the mills and camps. By 1880, shipments resumed, and the town stabilized.

A devastating 1881 fire destroyed the lumber yards, but the facilities were rebuilt. Local leaders, including Roberts, later lobbied to establish a separate county, and on May 16, 1893, Madera County was created from parts of Fresno County. Madera incorporated as a city on March 27, 1907.

=== The Madera Sugar Pine Company and the Flume's Legacy (1899–1931) ===
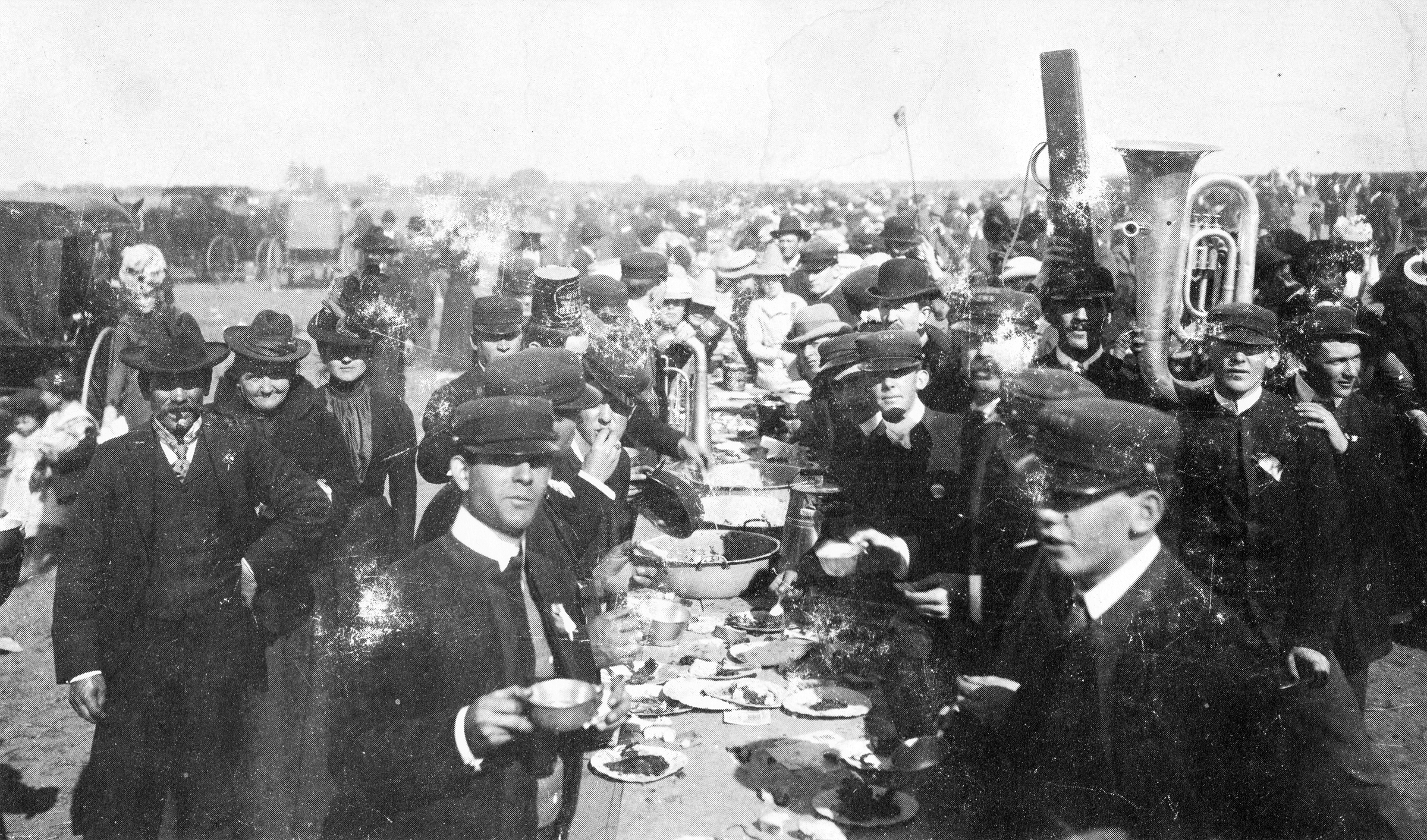
Madera celebrates completion of the world's longest lumber flume on October 27, 1900.

At the turn of the twentieth century, Madera entered its industrial peak. On May 8, 1899, Michigan lumberman Arthur Hill, entrepreneur Elmer H. Cox, and Return Roberts founded the Madera Sugar Pine Company, acquiring the earlier flume and vast mountain timberlands. The new company modernized operations, rebuilt and lengthened the flume, and added logging railroads to reach higher elevations. By 1900, the rebuilt flume stretched roughly 60–65 miles from the Sugar Pine highlands to Madera, making it one of the world's longest.

Thousands gathered on October 27, 1900, to celebrate its completion with a citywide barbecue. At its height, Madera became one of the West's major lumber centers. The company's mill—on the site now occupied by Martin Luther King Middle School—produced up to 50 million board feet of lumber per year, shipping products statewide by rail.

Periodic fires plagued the mills, including a destructive 1922 blaze at the Sugar Pine camp, but operations continued until the onset of the Great Depression. Collapsing markets forced the company to end production in 1931; by 1933 its assets were liquidated, concluding nearly six decades of timber-driven growth.

=== Agricultural Transformation (1930s–Present) ===
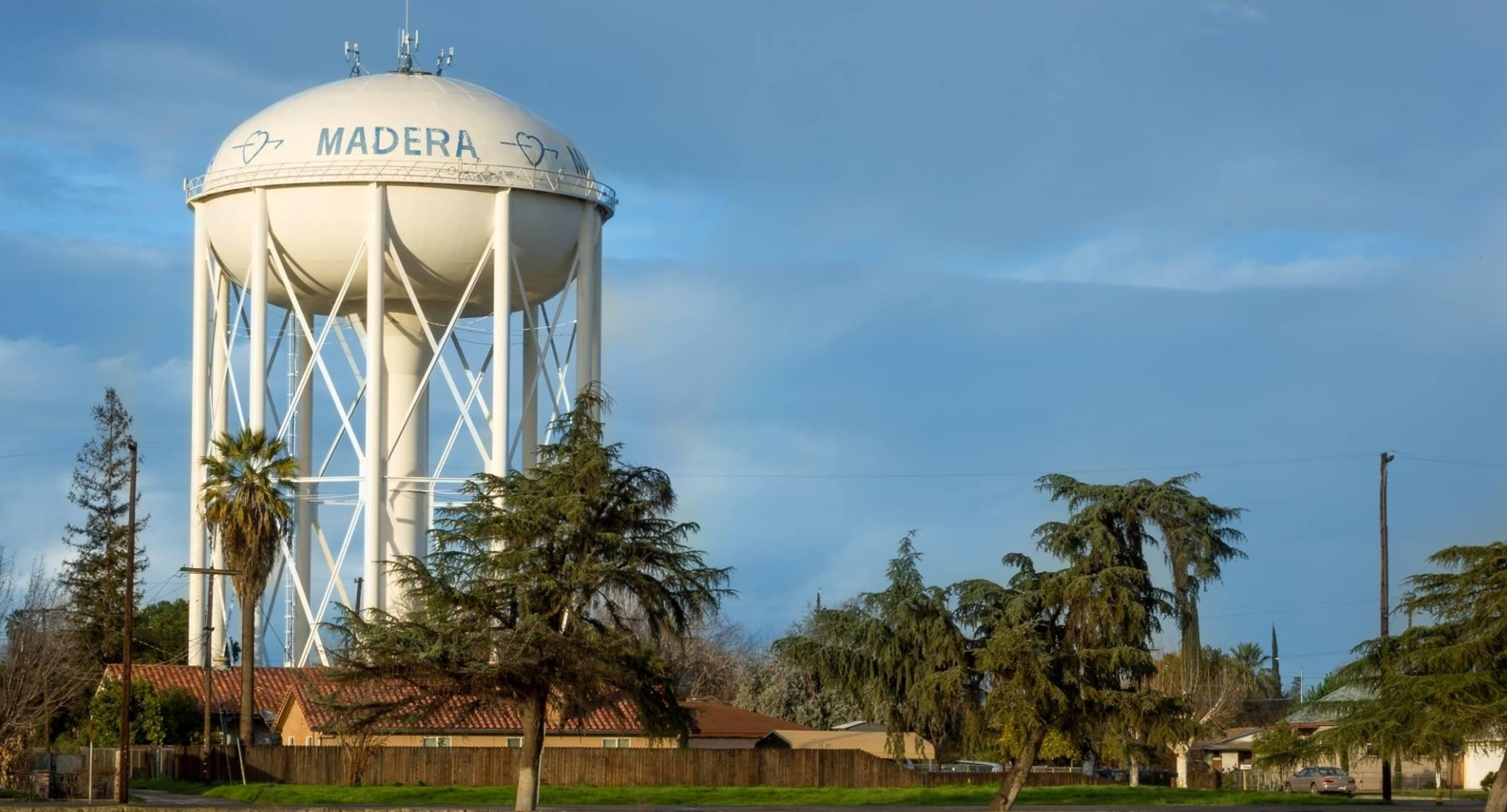
Madera Water Tower, a local landmark.

As the timber industry declined, agriculture became Madera's economic foundation. Farming had begun in the late nineteenth century, but the 1930s marked a decisive transition from sawmills to irrigated agriculture. During the Great Depression, many displaced lumber workers joined migrant farm laborers—including Dust Bowl refugees—who cultivated the region's orchards and vineyards.

By the 1940s, Madera County's fruit and nut output rose sharply—up 27 percent from 1940 to 1945—as growers expanded vineyards, fig orchards, and peach groves, later diversifying into almonds, pistachios, cotton, and alfalfa.

The post-war years brought new labor forces through the Bracero Program and subsequent unionization efforts that shaped Central Valley farm politics. Agriculture dominated Madera's economy by the 1960s, complemented by food processing, cotton gins, wineries, and nut plants that spurred city growth.

Landmarks from this period include the historic Madera County Courthouse, the prominent Madera Water Tower, and one of California's few remaining fully operational drive-in theaters. Together they reflect the city's evolution from a timber town to a diverse agricultural and community center.

== Geography ==
According to the United States Census Bureau, Madera has a total area of 16.5 square miles (43 km^{2}), all of it land. The Fresno River, a tributary of the San Joaquin River, passes north of downtown.

Madera lies within California's San Joaquin Valley, in the geographic heart of the state. The city is part of the Madera AVA wine region, known for vineyards producing Chardonnay, Zinfandel, and other Central Valley varietals.

=== Climate ===
Madera experiences a hot, dry steppe climate (BSk), characteristic of California's interior valleys. Summers are long, hot, and arid, while winters are mild and relatively wet. Average highs exceed 90 °F (32 °C) (32 °C (90 °F)) on more than 100 days per year, and temperatures above 100 °F (38 °C) (38 °C (100 °F)) occur on nearly 30 days annually. The record high of 116 °F (47 °C) was recorded on July 13, 1961, while the record low of 15 °F (−9 °C) occurred on January 10, 1949.

Annual precipitation averages about 10.8 inches (274.3 mm), concentrated between November and March. The wettest year on record (1983) produced 22.13 inches (562.1 mm) of rainfall, while the driest (2013) received only 4.49 inches (114.0 mm). Snowfall is rare, with minor accumulations recorded only once in modern history (January 1962).

Climate data for Madera, California (Madera Municipal Airport), 1991–2020 normals, extremes 1928–present
Month	Jan	Feb	Mar	Apr	May	Jun	Jul	Aug	Sep	Oct	Nov	Dec	Year
Record high °F (°C)	77 (25)	83 (28)	91 (33)	99 (37)	107 (42)	115 (46)	116 (47)	113 (45)	115 (46)	105 (41)	92 (33)	76 (24)	116 (47)
Mean daily maximum °F (°C)	57 (14)	63 (17)	69 (21)	75 (24)	84 (29)	92 (33)	98 (37)	97 (36)	92 (33)	80 (27)	66 (19)	56 (13)	78 (26)
Mean daily minimum °F (°C)	39 (4)	41 (5)	44 (7)	46 (8)	52 (11)	58 (14)	63 (17)	61 (16)	58 (14)	50 (10)	42 (6)	38 (3)	49 (9)
Average precipitation inches (mm)	2.08 (53)	1.99 (51)	1.98 (50)	0.89 (23)	0.47 (12)	0.16 (4.1)	0.01 (0.25)	0.00 (0.00)	0.03 (0.76)	0.44 (11)	0.92 (23)	1.82 (46)	10.79 (274)
Average precipitation days (≥ 0.01 in)	10	10	9	5	2	1	0	0	1	3	7	10	58
Source 1: NOAA
Source 2: National Weather Service

== Demographics ==
Historical population
Census	Pop.	Note	%±
1880	217		—
1890	950		337.8%
1910	2,404		—
1920	3,444		43.3%
1930	4,665		35.5%
1940	6,457		38.4%
1950	10,497		62.6%
1960	14,430		37.5%
1970	16,044		11.2%
1980	21,732		35.5%
1990	29,281		34.7%
2000	43,207		47.6%
2010	61,416		42.1%
2020	66,224		7.8%
2024 (est.)	69,094	▲	4.3%
U.S. Decennial Census

=== 2020 census ===
As of the 2020 census, Madera had a population of 66,224, a 7.8% increase from 61,416 in 2010. The median age was 29.3 years. 32.9% of residents were under the age of 18 and 9.7% were 65 years of age or older. For every 100 females there were 99.5 males, and for every 100 females age 18 and over there were 98.1 males age 18 and over. The population density was approximately 4,020 inhabitants per square mile (1,552/km^{2}).

99.5% of residents lived in urban areas, while 0.5% lived in rural areas.

There were 17,672 households in Madera, of which 53.6% had children under the age of 18 living in them. Of all households, 49.0% were married-couple households, 14.5% were households with a male householder and no spouse or partner present, and 26.7% were households with a female householder and no spouse or partner present. About 14.6% of all households were made up of individuals and 7.5% had someone living alone who was 65 years of age or older. The average household size was 3.69 and the average family size was 4.00.

There were 18,189 housing units, of which 2.8% were vacant. The homeowner vacancy rate was 0.8% and the rental vacancy rate was 2.1%. Of occupied housing units, 51.3% were owner-occupied and 48.7% were renter-occupied.

Racial composition as of the 2020 census
Race	Number	Percent
White	17,063	25.8%
Black or African American	1,750	2.6%
American Indian and Alaska Native	4,554	6.9%
Asian	1,834	2.8%
Native Hawaiian and Other Pacific Islander	66	0.1%
Some other race	28,665	43.3%
Two or more races	12,292	18.6%
Hispanic or Latino (of any race)	53,471	80.7%

== Parks and recreation ==
As of 2024, Madera maintains 11 public parks encompassing roughly 160 acres of green space. Facilities include three community centers, one skate park, one community garden, and the city-owned Madera Municipal Golf Course. The city also operates a cross-town trail network and three public swimming pools located at the Centennial Pool Complex. Parks and recreation services are administered by the Department of Parks and Community Services, which oversees special events, youth programs, and community enrichment activities.

== Economy ==
Madera's economy is driven primarily by agriculture, manufacturing, education, and public administration. The surrounding county is among the leading producers of grapes, almonds, pistachios, and figs in the United States. Food processing and distribution facilities support the region's agricultural output, while the Madera Unified School District and City of Madera are major public employers. The industrial sector continues to expand near State Route 99, supported by transportation and warehousing infrastructure.

Retail, logistics, and construction contribute to the city's private-sector growth. Although service-based employment has increased, agriculture and education remain the dominant job sectors.

== Government ==
Madera operates under a council–manager system. The mayor is elected at large, while six city council members represent individual districts. The city serves as the seat of Madera County. In the California State Legislature, Madera is in the 14th senatorial district, represented by Democrat Anna Caballero and the 27th Assembly district, represented by Democrat Esmeralda Soria. Federally, Madera lies within California's California's 13th congressional district, represented by Democrat Adam Gray.

== Education ==
Madera Unified School District administers public education throughout the city. The district includes:

- Madera High School
- Madera South High School
- Madera Technical Exploration Center (MADTEC)
- King Hussein School

Private schools include:

- Saint Joachim School (PreK–8)
- Crossroads Christian School (PreK–8)

Higher education is provided by Madera Community College, part of the State Center Community College District.

== Infrastructure ==
Madera maintains approximately 203 miles of city streets within its limits. The city's water system includes 20 active wells and about 200 miles of waterlines, while wastewater is managed through roughly 175 miles of sewer lines. Public safety is provided by the Madera Police Department and the Madera Fire Department.

The city manages about 3,300 streetlights and 40 traffic signals, balancing pedestrian safety and vehicle flow.

=== Transportation ===
Madera is served by several major highways:

- State Route 99
- State Route 41
- State Route 145

Public transportation is provided by Madera Metro, which operates fixed-route intracity service, and by Madera County Connection, offering intercity routes to nearby communities. A Greyhound Lines station operates in downtown Madera.

Just north of the city lies the Madera Amtrak station, and a future California High-Speed Rail stop is planned.

Madera Municipal Airport serves general aviation on approximately 524 acres (2.12 km^{2}) on the northwest edge of the city, operated by the Public Works Department.

== Notable people ==
=== Arts and culture ===
- Frank Bergon, novelist and author of Jesse's Ghost (2011), set in Madera and who's civic writings frequently highlight Madera County's cultural development.
- Jeannine Riley, actress best known for her role in Petticoat Junction
- Martha Baird Rockefeller (1895–1971), concert pianist, philanthropist, and wife of John D. Rockefeller Jr.
- Lorin Whitney (1914–2007), organist and recording artist
- Virginia Stroud (1951–2024), painter and former Miss Indian America
- Avery Stafford, gospel and R&B vocalist

=== Sports ===
- Connor Brogdon, pitcher for the Philadelphia Phillies
- Dwayne Crump, defensive back for the St. Louis Cardinals
- Lee Evans (1947–2021), Olympic gold medalist and world record holder in track and field
- Alec Gamboa (born 1997), pitcher for the Boston Red Sox
- Zoila Frausto Gurgel, women's mixed martial arts champion
- Lavar Johnson, mixed martial artist and former UFC heavyweight competitor
- Oswaldo Lopez, ultramarathon runner and winner of the 2011 Badwater Ultramarathon
- Frank McNally (1907–1993), all-pro football player
- Wally O'Connor (1903–1950), four-time Olympian in water polo and swimming, 1924 gold medalist
- La Schelle Tarver (1959–2024), outfielder for the Boston Red Sox
- Leroy "Roy" Zimmerman (1918–1997), all-pro football player, Hall of Fame softball pitcher, and educator

=== Military ===
Jack W. Kelso (1934–1952), Medal of Honor recipient

=== Public service and science ===
- Kathryn Grove Shipp (1904–1977), explosives expert; raised in Madera
- Lee Evans (1947 – 2021), Olympic gold medalist who also served as a coach and human rights advocate.

== See also ==
- California wine
- Madera County, California
- Madera Speedway
- San Joaquin Valley
- Madera AVA
