= Fresno High School =

Public high school in California, United States

Location
- 1839 N. Echo Ave. Fresno, California 93704; United States; 36.7672°N 119.80536°W

Information
- School type: Public
- Established: 1889; 137 years ago
- School district: Fresno Unified School District
- Principal: Amy Smith
- Teaching staff: 101.60 (FTE)
- Grades: 9–12
- Enrollment: 2,009 (2023-2024)
- Student to teacher ratio: 19.77
- Colors: Purple and gold
- Mascot: Warrior
- Rival: Roosevelt High School
- Accreditation: WASC
- Newspaper: The Owlet
- Additional Accreditation: International Baccalaureate
- Website: FHS

Fresno High School is a four-year secondary school located in Fresno, California. It is part of the Fresno Unified School District. Fresno High is the oldest high school in the Fresno metropolitan area and one of the few International Baccalaureate schools. As of 2023, Amy Smith is the 30th and current principal of Fresno High.

Fresno High was founded in 1889 as the first secondary school in Fresno county.

== History ==
Fresno High School was founded in 1889. The new school quickly outgrew the available space and had to be moved to the White School, where the Memorial Auditorium is located today. Plans for a new high school building were developed.

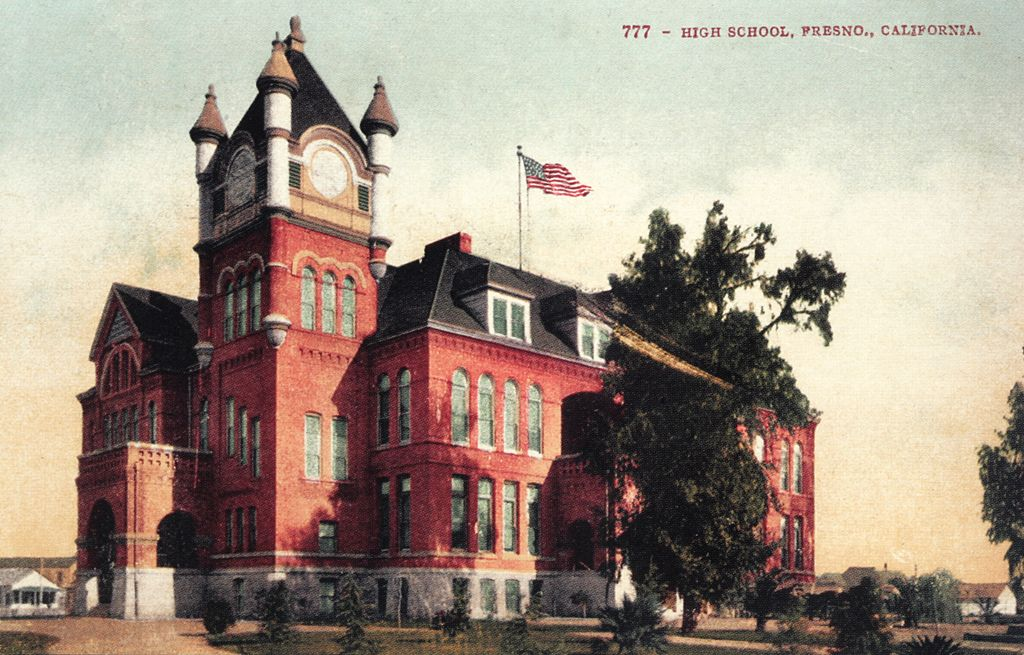
Colored Postcard of Fresno High School in 1896

In September 1896, the school year began in the new building on O Street between Stanislaus and Tuolumne streets. The new back structure, with its clock tower, had the latest and most modern facilities, including a chemistry laboratory, gymnasium, library, and lecture hall.

In 1922, the school moved to its present site at 1839 North Echo Avenue, near Palm and McKinley Avenues. Fresno High School is surrounded by large homes (originally one of Fresno's affluent areas) and large Fresno ash and pine trees. On October 15, 2002, the historic Royce Hall building caught fire and suffered minimal damage.

The campus is divided into several components. The two main components are "South Side" and "North Side", named so from their campus location. South Side campus houses Title I offices, the business, foreign language, science, and mathematics divisions. The North Side houses English, social sciences, art, and history divisions. Physical education, leadership and JROTC are housed on the westernmost portion of the campus. The drama and music divisions, in addition to various miscellaneous classrooms, are attached to Fresno High's historic Royce Hall. There is a little known fallout shelter entrance at the rear of the handball courts, (in the middle where the metal grate is on the ground), that goes down stairs to a door that leads under "goat hill" and then under Royce Hall.

Renovations to Royce Hall were completed for the 2018–2019 school year. They were worked on throughout the 2017–2018 school year. The goal was to give the historic hall a modernization which included new carpeting, acoustic sound paneling, a sound booth located near the auditorium entrance and the removal and relocation of a handicap elevator to make more room for stair access to the stage.

== Academics ==
Fresno High School offers its students the full International Baccalaureate diplomas. The campus has received poor academic achievement scores in the past, but has shown improvement. The campus employs 133 full and part-time instructors, in addition to several guidance counselors, classified staff, administrative employees, one full-time psychologist and one full-time family therapist.

== Athletics ==
The campus offers Prep and Cheer, football, cross country, soccer (valley champion 2010–2011 season), baseball, golf, tennis, water polo, softball teams, basketball, track and field, swim, badminton, and a lacrosse team.

== Notable alumni ==
- Lillian Albertson — actress
- Armen Alchian — economist
- Charles Amirkhanian — composer and broadcaster
- Phil Austin — writer and comedian of The Firesign Theatre
- Ross Bagdasarian — creator of Alvin and the Chipmunks
- Bonnie Bannon — actress, model, dancer
- Frank Chance — Major League Baseball first baseman and manager in the Hall of Fame
- Mike Connors — actor in films and star of TV series Mannix
- Pat Corrales — Major League Baseball catcher and manager
- Sean Halton — Major League Baseball first baseman
- Dick Contino — accordionist and actor
- Lee Cronbach — educational psychologist
- Gordon Dunn — silver medalist - discus throw (1936 Summer Olympics), Mayor of Fresno (1949-1957)
- Dick Ellsworth — Major League Baseball pitcher
- Geoffrey Gamble — former president, Montana State University
- Jon Hall — actor
- David Harris — anti-war activist and journalist
- Bobby Jones — New York Mets and San Diego Padres pitcher
- Skip Kenney — swimming coach
- Arthur Scott King — physicist and astrophysicist
- Jim Maloney — Major League Baseball pitcher
- Monte Pearson — Major League Baseball pitcher, 4-time World Series champion
- Sam Peckinpah — film director, screenwriter notable for The Wild Bunch
- Les Richter — Los Angeles Rams football player
- William Saroyan — playwright
- Tom Seaver — Major League Baseball pitcher in Hall of Fame
- Dick Selma — Major League Baseball pitcher
- Ginny Simms — singer and film actress
- Frederick C. Weyand — former U.S. Army Chief of Staff (1974-1976) and member of the Joint Chiefs of Staff
