= Theodore Roosevelt High School (Fresno, California) =

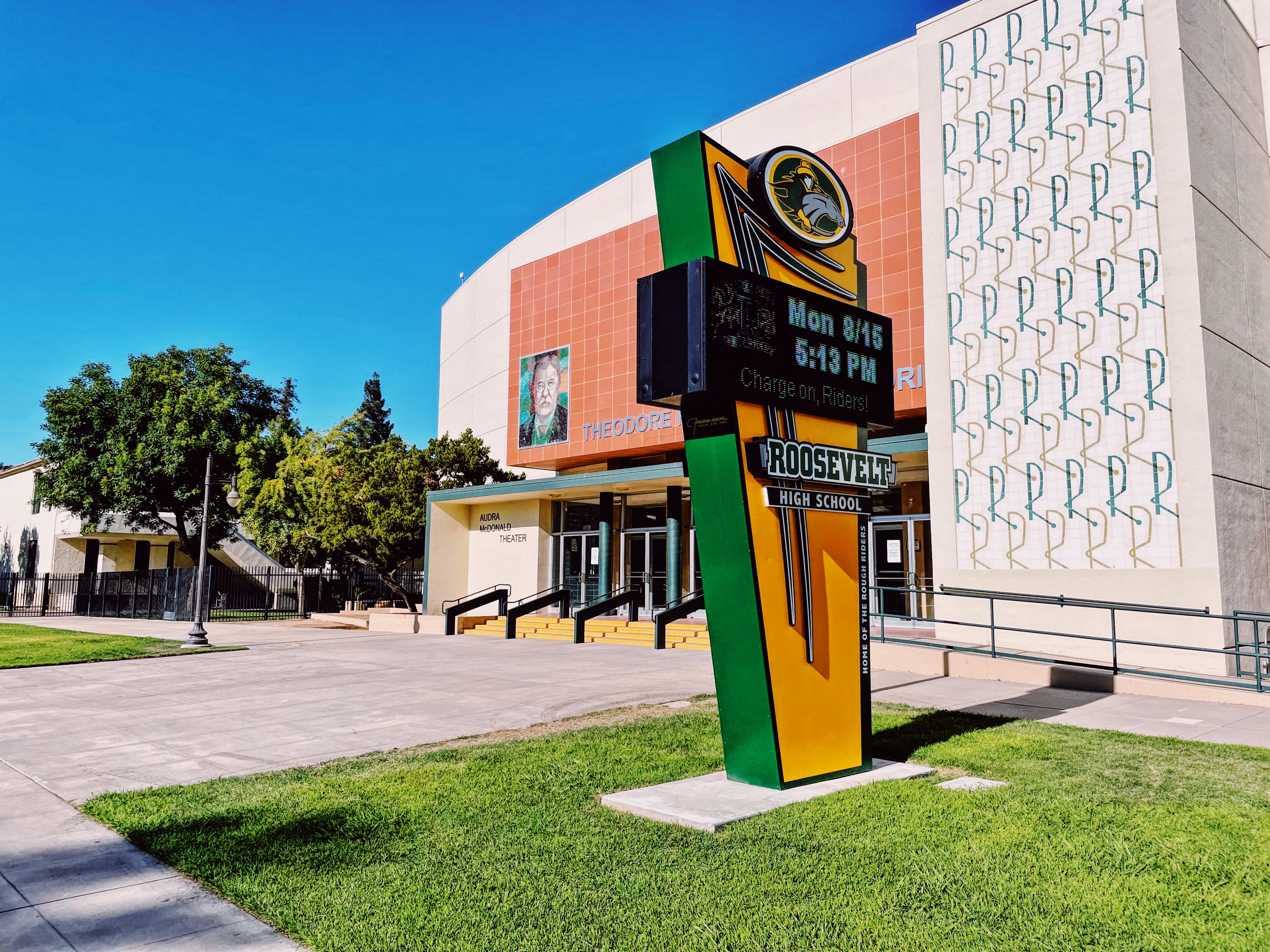
- Roosevelt High School seen from S Cedar Ave

Location
- 4250 E. Tulare Ave; Fresno, California; United States; 36.742°N 119.753°W

Information
- Type: Public
- Established: 1928
- School district: Fresno Unified School District
- Principal: Michael Allen
- Teaching staff: 115.59 (FTE)
- Enrollment: 2,228 (2022-2023)
- Student to teacher ratio: 19.28
- Colors: Kelly green and Gold
- Mascot: Rough Rider
- Publication: The T.R. Times - NOT ACTIVE -
- Website: roosevelt.fresnounified.org

Theodore Roosevelt High School (RHS), is located in southeast Fresno, California. It is a high school established within the Fresno Unified School District. The high school mascot is the Rough Rider (in physical form it is a horse) named after the 1st U.S. Volunteer Cavalry Regiment Theodore Roosevelt organized and helped command during the Spanish–American War. The high school's colors are green and gold.

The school was opened in 1928, and was both a junior and senior high school. It now serves grades 9-12. During the 2011–2012 school year 2,184 students attended RHS.

The school received publicity in 2014 with the movie documentary Try which focused on Roosevelt's rugby program and the positive effect it has had on the high school students who began playing.

== Theodore Roosevelt High School Auditorium ==
The Roosevelt Auditorium at Roosevelt High School in Fresno, California, was dedicated on Wednesday, September 22, 1954, at 10:00 a.m. An open house was held that evening. The event was organized by the Fresno City Board of Education, the Superintendent of Schools and administrative staff.

When the auditorium was built it included the main auditorium with seating capacity of 2,153 and a smaller theater seating 200. Allied classrooms included a music room, two regular class rooms, a stagecraft, electrical and radio shop, a radio studio class room with recording and control room equipment as well as dressing rooms and make-up rooms.

== Roosevelt School of the Arts ==
The Roosevelt School of the Arts is a district-wide magnet school program established in 1984. The program offers students in-depth specialized training in performing, visual, and media arts.

On May 26, 2018, the Roosevelt Auditorium was named in honor of 1988 RSA alumna Audra McDonald, a six-time Tony Award winner.

== Awards and recognition ==
RHS was recognized by the California State Board of Education in 1996 California Distinguished School Award. The school has also won two Golden Bell Awards. RHS renewed their WASC accreditation in 2017.

== Demographics ==
Many of its students are immigrants from Mexico and Southeast Asia. 51.8% of the student population are English learners. Below are rough figures of the student population.

Ethnicity	Population	Percentage of total population
Asian	454	11.9%
Pacific Islander	3	0.1%
Latino	2078	78.2%
African American	123	4.6%
White	183	4.6%

== Notable alumni ==
- Chris Gorham, actor
- Wade Blasingame, Major League Baseball pitcher
- Randy Scarbery, Major League Baseball pitcher
- Mike Dupree, Major League Baseball pitcher
- Jack Shepard, Major League Baseball catcher
- Johnny Estrada, Major League Baseball catcher
- Sharon Leal, actress
- Audra McDonald, actress and singer
- Gary Soto, author
- Heidi Blickenstaff, actress
- Mick Wingert, voice actor
- Virak Ou, human rights activist
- Taku Hirano, percussionist
- Miranda Rae Mayo, actress
- Gary Alcorn, NBA
- Louis Jackson, NFL player
- Safiya Noble, professor
- Bryson Williams, Basketball Player
- Barbara McAlister, Olympic high diver

== Notable faculty ==
- Dale Doig, politician and educator
