= Fresno County, California =

County in California, United States

Fresno County
- County
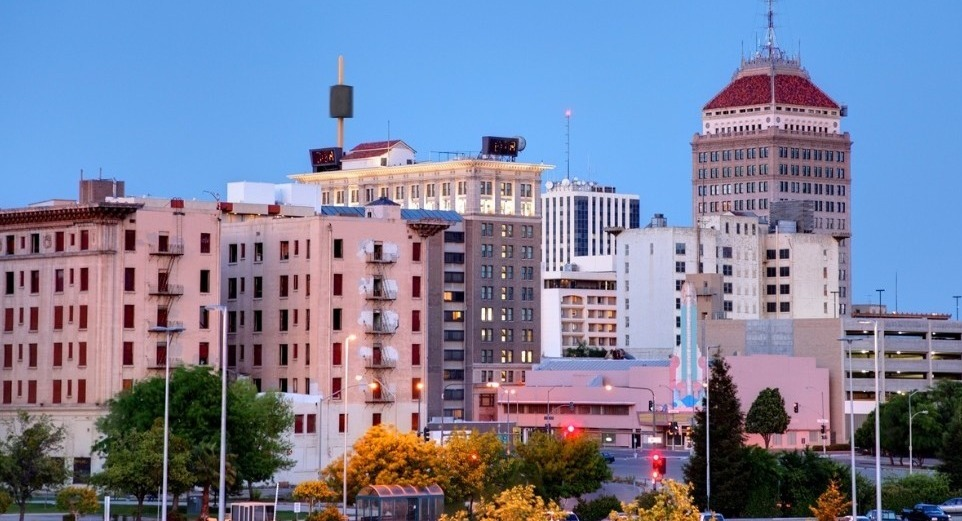
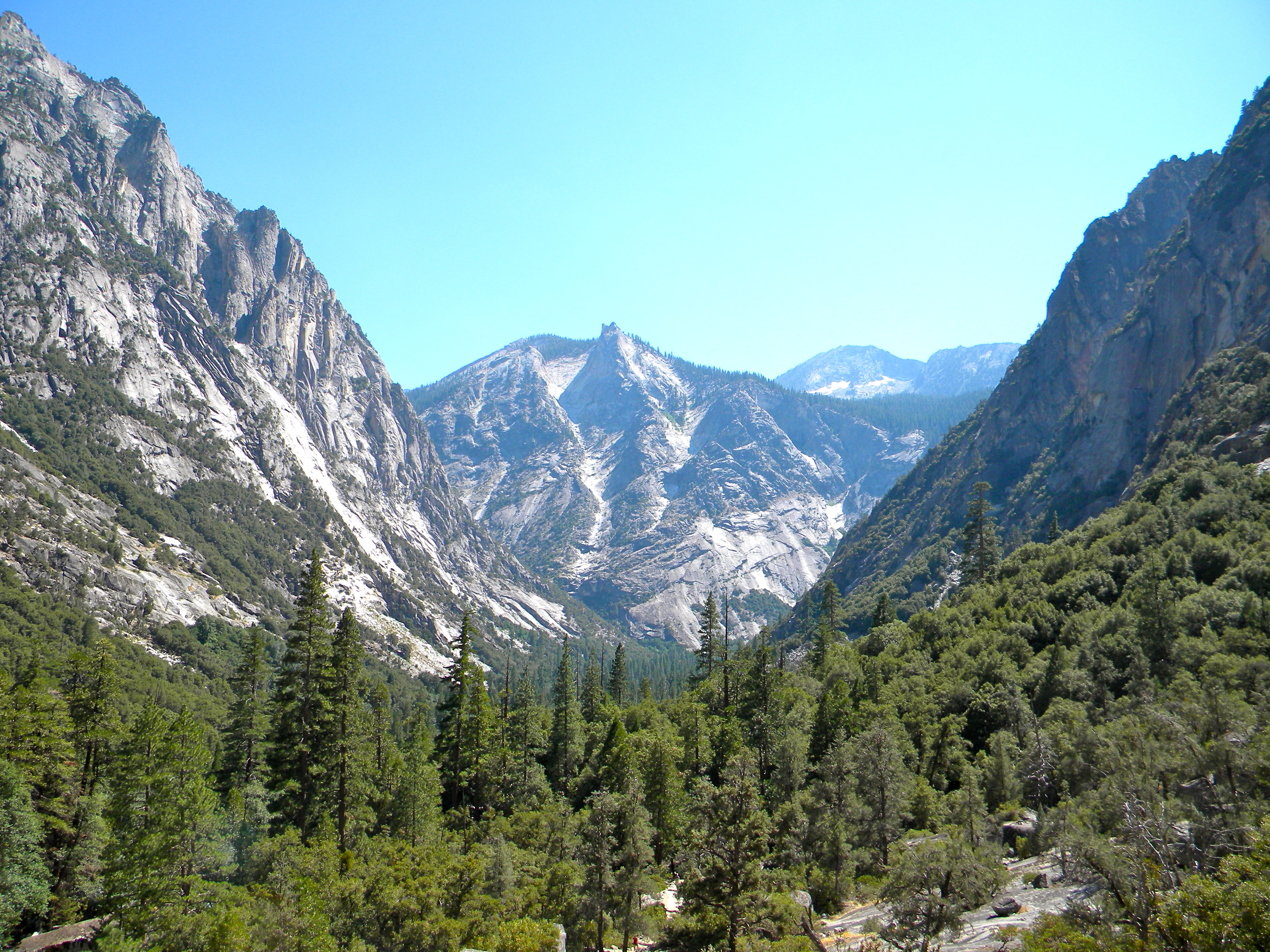
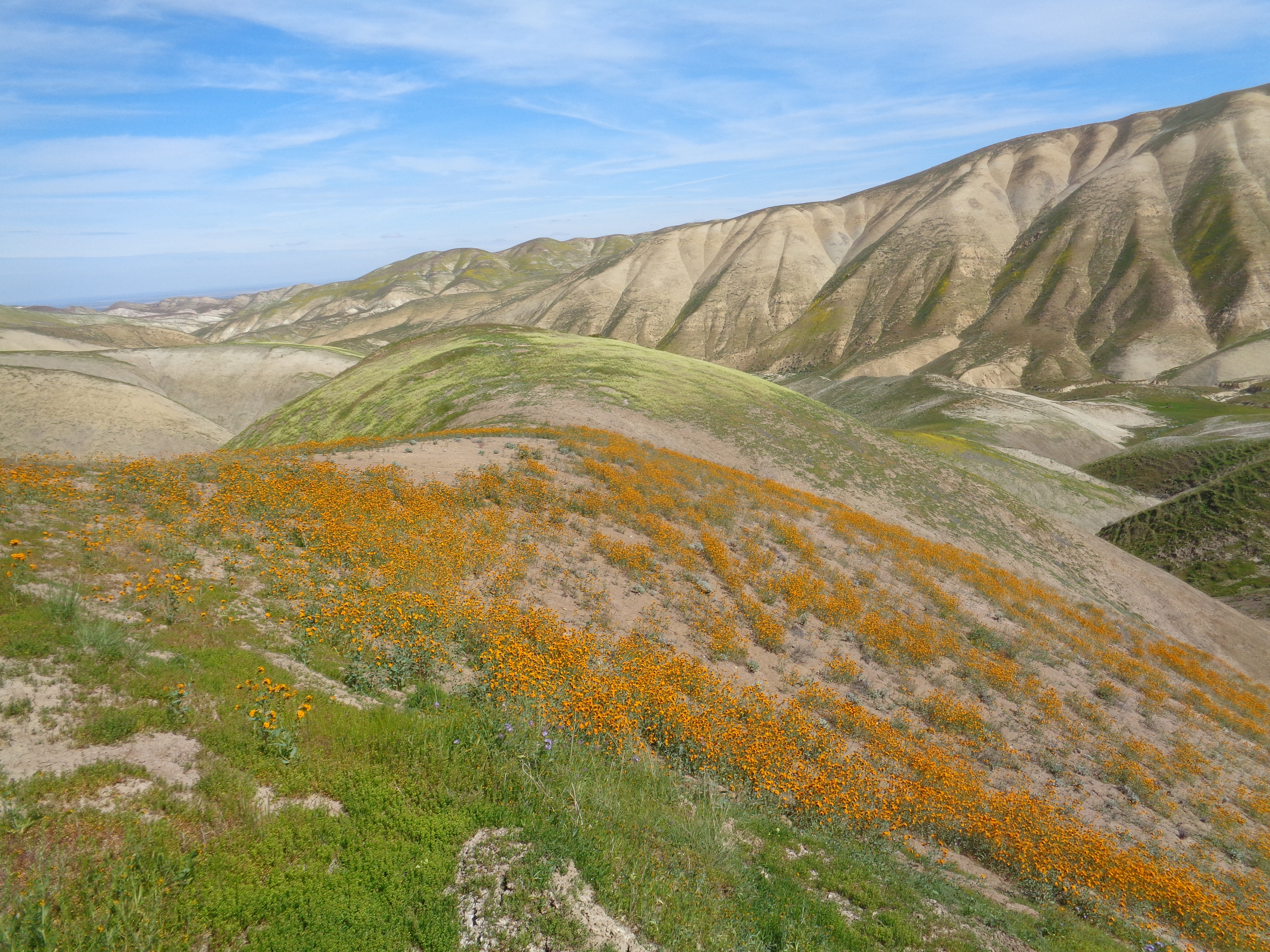
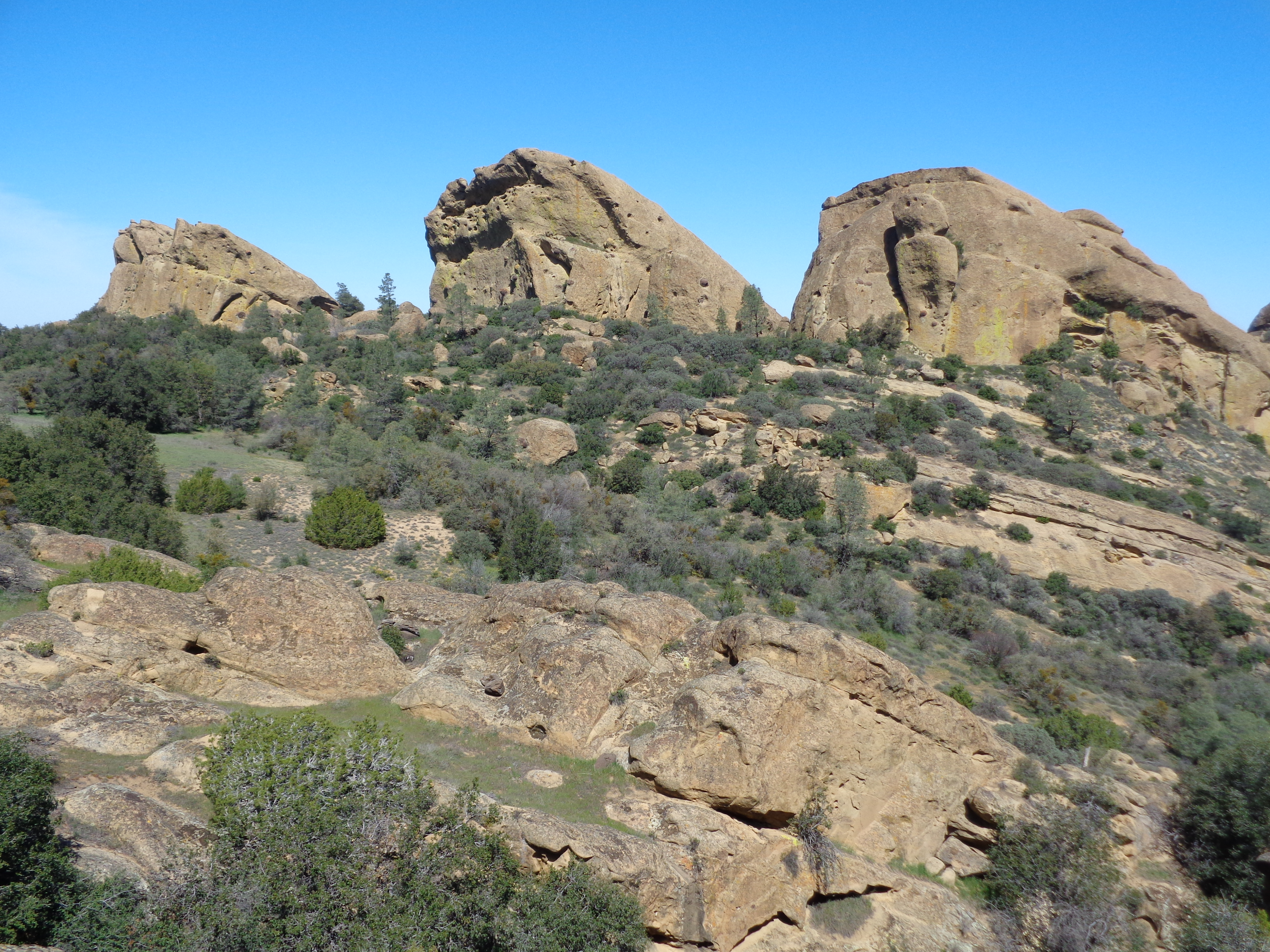
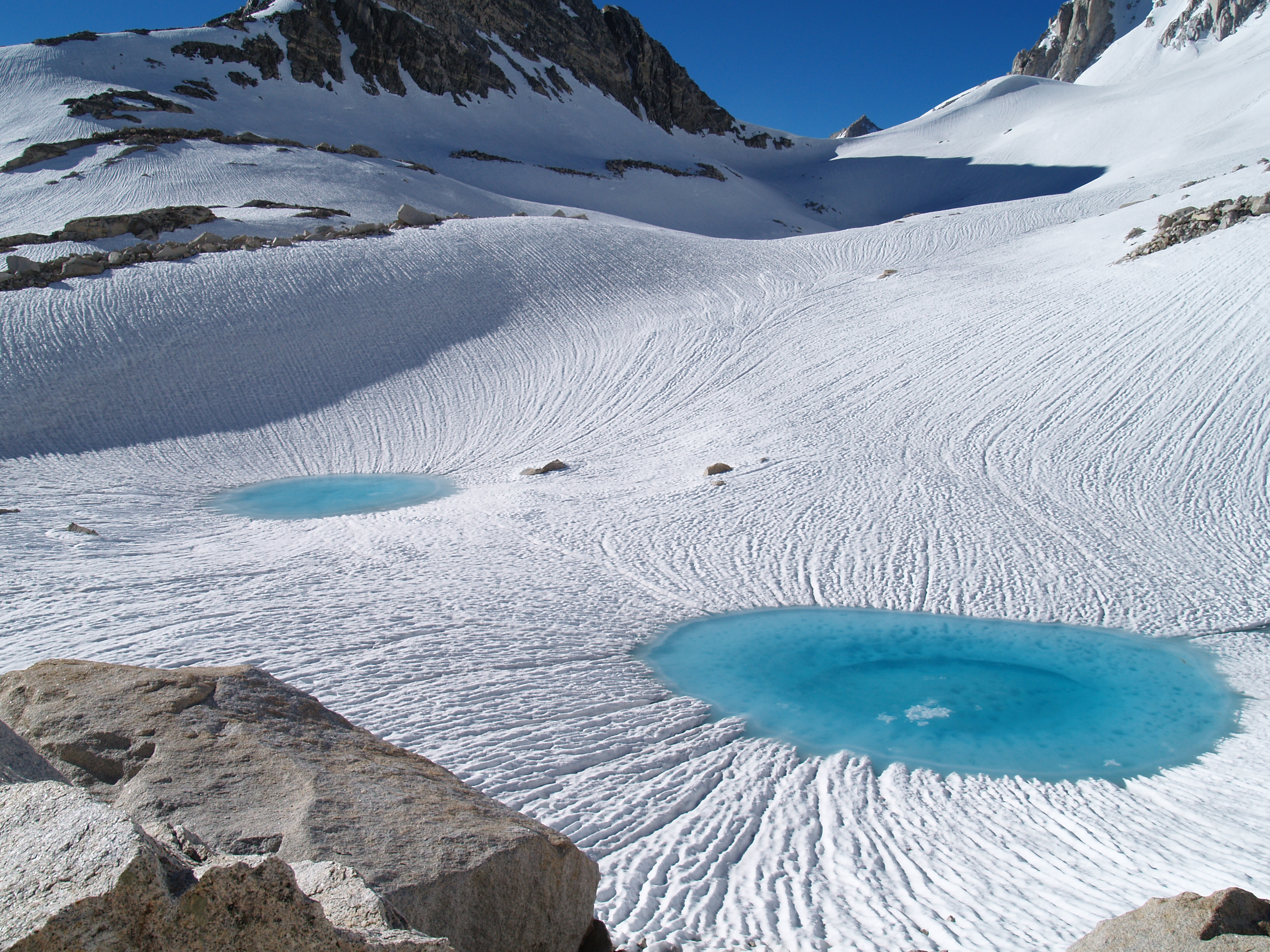
- Fresno Kings Canyon Tumey Hills Joaquin Rocks John Muir Wilderness

- Seal
- Interactive map of Fresno County
- Location in the state of California
- Coordinates: 36.75°N 119.65°W
- Country: United States
- State: California
- Region: San Joaquin Valley
- Metro area: Fresno–Madera
- Incorporated: 19 April 1856
- Named for: Oregon Ash Tree
- County seat: Fresno
- Largest city: Fresno
- Incorporated cities: 15

Government
  - Type: Council–CAO
  - Body: Board of Supervisors
  - Chair: Garry Bredefeld
  - Vice Chair: Luis Chavez
  - Board of Supervisors: Supervisors: Brian Pacheco; Garry Bredefeld; Luis Chavez; Buddy Mendes; Nathan Magsig
  - County Administrative Officer: Paul Nerland

Area
  - Total: 6,011 sq mi (15,570 km^{2})
  - Land: 5,958 sq mi (15,430 km^{2})
  - Water: 53 sq mi (140 km^{2})
- Highest elevation: 14,248 ft (4,343 m)

Population (2020 census)
  - Total: 1,008,654
  - Estimate (2025): 1,035,456 ▲
  - Density: 169.3/sq mi (65.36/km^{2})

GDP
  - Total: $55.426 billion (2022)
- Time zone: UTC−8 (Pacific)
  - Summer (DST): UTC−7 (Pacific Daylight Time)
- Area code: 559
- FIPS code: 06-019
- GNIS feature ID: 277274
- Congressional districts: 5th, 13th, 20th, 21st
- Website: www.co.fresno.ca.us

Fresno County (/ˈfrɛznoʊ/), officially the County of Fresno, is located in the central portion of the U.S. state of California. As of the 2020 United States census, the population was 1,008,654. The county seat is Fresno, the fifth-most populous city in California. Fresno County comprises the Fresno, CA Metropolitan Statistical Area, which is part of the Fresno–Madera, CA Combined Statistical Area. It is located in the Central Valley, south of Stockton and north of Bakersfield. Since 2010, statewide droughts in California have further strained both Fresno County's and the entire Central Valley's water security.

== History ==
The area now known as Fresno County was the traditional homeland of Yokuts and Mono peoples, and was later settled by Spaniards during a search for suitable mission sites. In 1846, this area became part of the United States as a result of the Mexican-American War.

Fresno County was formed in 1856 from parts of Mariposa, Merced and Tulare counties. Fresno is Spanish for "ash tree" and it was in recognition of the abundance of the shrubby local ash, Fraxinus dipetala, growing along the San Joaquin River that it received its name. Parts of Fresno County's territory were given to Mono County in 1861 and to Madera County in 1893. The original county seat was along the San Joaquin River in Millerton, but was moved to the rapidly growing town of Fresno on the newly built Southern Pacific Railroad line. A special election was held on March 23, 1874, to decide if Millerton should remain the County Seat or if the County Seat should be moved to another location. Fresno won the election that day and became the new Fresno County Seat.

The settling of Fresno County was not without its conflicts, land disputes, and other natural disasters. Floods caused immeasurable damage elsewhere and fires also plagued the settlers of Fresno County. In 1882, the greatest of the early day fires wiped out an entire block of the city of Fresno, and was followed by another devastating blaze in 1883.

At the same time residents brought irrigation, electricity, and extensive agriculture to the area. In 1865, William Helm brought his sheep to Fresno county, which was then a vast space of open land. Helm was the largest individual sheep grower in Fresno County. Moses Church developed the first canals, called "Church Ditches", for irrigation. These canals allowed extensive cultivation of wheat. Francis Eisen, leader of the wine industry in Fresno County, also began the raisin industry in 1875, when he accidentally let some of his grapes dry on the vine. Anthony Easterby and Clovis Cole developed extensive grain and cattle ranches. These and other citizens laid the groundwork for the cultivation of Fresno County – now one of the nation's leading agricultural regions. In more recent times cotton became a major crop in Fresno and the southern San Joaquin Valley, but recent drought and lower demand have lessened cotton's importance to the local economy.

The discovery of oil in the western part of the county, near the town of Coalinga at the foot of the Coast Ranges, brought about an economic boom in the 1900s (decade), even though the field itself was known at least as early as the 1860s. By 1910, Coalinga Oil Field, the largest field in Fresno County, was the most richly productive oil field in California; a dramatic oil gusher in 1909, the biggest in California up until that time, was an event of sufficient excitement to cause the Los Angeles Stock Exchange to close for a day so that its members could come by train to view it. The Coalinga field continues to produce oil, and is currently the eighth-largest field in the state.

More than thirty structures in Fresno County are on the National Register of Historic Places, including the Fresno Water Tower, which once held over 250,000 US gallons (950 m^{3}) of water for the city of Fresno, the Meux Home, and Kearney Mansion Museum.

== Geography ==
According to the U.S. Census Bureau, the county has a total area of 6,011 square miles (15,570 km^{2}), of which 5,958 square miles (15,430 km^{2}) is land and 53 square miles (140 km^{2}) (0.9%) is water.

Fresno County consists of about 38 smaller towns including Fresno, Selma, Parlier, Clovis, Reedley, Sanger, Kerman, Kingsburg, Coalinga, Firebaugh, Friant, Mendota, Fowler, Shaver Lake, San Joaquin, Orange Cove, Del Ray, Squaw Valley, Auberry, Huron, Caruthers, Riverdale, Laton, Big Creek, Tranquility, Biola, Raisin City, Easton, Three Rocks, Cantua Creek, Lanare, Minkler, Bowles.

Major watercourses are the San Joaquin River, Kings River, Delta-Mendota Canal, Big Creek, Friant Kern Canal, Helm Canal and Madera Canal. It is bordered on the west by the Coast Range and on the east by the Sierra Nevada. It is the center of a large agricultural area, known as the most agriculturally rich county in the United States. The county withdrew 3.7 billion US gallons (14,000,000 m^{3}) of fresh water per day in 2000, more than any other county in the United States. In recent years, statewide droughts in California have further strained both Fresno's and the entire Central Valley's water security.

Fresno County is part of the Madera AVA wine region. However, Fresno was named after two particular ash trees that grew near the town of Minkler on the Kings River, one of which is still alive and standing.

=== Adjacent counties ===
- Madera County (north)
- Kings County (south)
- Mono County (northeast)
- Merced County (northwest)
- Tulare County (southeast)
- Monterey County (southwest)
- Inyo County (east)
- San Benito County (west)

=== National protected areas ===
- Giant Sequoia National Monument (part)
- Kings Canyon National Park (part)
- Sequoia National Forest (part)
- Sierra National Forest (part)

=== Geology ===
A number of minerals have been discovered in the county, including macdonaldite, krauskopfite, walstromite, fresnoite, verplanckite, muirite, traskite, and kampfite.

In October 2019, the Bureau of Land Management ended a five-year moratorium on leasing federal land in California to fossil fuel companies, opening 725,000 acres (1100 sq. miles; 29,000 ha) to drilling in San Benito, Monterey, and Fresno counties.

== Demographics ==
Historical population
Census	Pop.	Note	%±
1860	4,605		—
1870	6,336		37.6%
1880	9,478		49.6%
1890	32,026		237.9%
1900	37,862		18.2%
1910	75,657		99.8%
1920	128,779		70.2%
1930	144,379		12.1%
1940	178,565		23.7%
1950	276,515		54.9%
1960	365,945		32.3%
1970	413,053		12.9%
1980	514,621		24.6%
1990	667,490		29.7%
2000	799,407		19.8%
2010	930,450		16.4%
2020	1,008,654		8.4%
2025 (est.)	1,035,456	▲	2.7%
U.S. Decennial Census; 1790–1960 1900–1990; 1990–2000 2010 2020

=== 2020 census ===
As of the 2020 census, the county had a population of 1,008,654, and the median age was 33.3 years. 27.6% of residents were under the age of 18 and 13.2% were 65 years of age or older. For every 100 females there were 98.9 males, and for every 100 females age 18 and over there were 96.9 males age 18 and over.

The racial makeup of the county was 37.1% White, 4.8% Black or African American, 2.2% American Indian and Alaska Native, 11.2% Asian, 0.2% Native Hawaiian and Pacific Islander, 28.2% from some other race, and 16.2% from two or more races. Hispanic or Latino residents of any race comprised 53.6% of the population.

88.7% of residents lived in urban areas, while 11.3% lived in rural areas.

There were 319,296 households in the county, of which 40.9% had children under the age of 18 living with them and 27.7% had a female householder with no spouse or partner present. About 20.5% of all households were made up of individuals and 9.0% had someone living alone who was 65 years of age or older.

There were 338,441 housing units, of which 5.7% were vacant. Among occupied housing units, 54.3% were owner-occupied and 45.7% were renter-occupied. The homeowner vacancy rate was 1.0% and the rental vacancy rate was 4.2%.

=== Racial and ethnic composition ===
Fresno County, California – Racial and ethnic composition Note: the US Census treats Hispanic/Latino as an ethnic category. This table excludes Latinos from the racial categories and assigns them to a separate category. Hispanics/Latinos may be of any race.
Race / Ethnicity (NH = Non-Hispanic)	Pop 1980	Pop 1990	Pop 2000	Pop 2010	Pop 2020	% 1980	% 1990	% 2000	% 2010	% 2020
White alone (NH)	316,895	338,595	317,522	304,522	271,889	61.58%	50.73%	39.72%	32.73%	26.96%
Black or African American alone (NH)	24,557	31,311	40,291	45,005	44,295	4.77%	4.69%	5.04%	4.84%	4.39%
Native American or Alaska Native alone (NH)	4,747	5,070	6,223	5,979	6,074	0.92%	0.76%	0.78%	0.64%	0.60%
Asian alone (NH)	14,777	54,110	63,029	86,856	109,665	2.87%	8.11%	7.88%	9.33%	10.87%
Native Hawaiian or Pacific Islander alone (NH)	x	x	682	1,066	1,233	0.09%	0.11%	0.09%	0.11%	0.12%
Other race alone (NH)	2,855	1,770	1,451	1,744	5,209	0.55%	0.27%	0.18%	0.19%	0.52%
Mixed race or Multiracial (NH)	x	x	18,573	17,208	29,546	x	x	2.32%	1.85%	2.93%
Hispanic or Latino (any race)	150,790	236,634	351,636	468,070	540,743	29.30%	35.45%	43.99%	50.31%	53.61%
Total	514,621	667,490	799,407	930,450	1,008,654	100.00%	100.00%	100.00%	100.00%	100.00%

=== American Community Survey 2025 data ===
The United States Census Bureau estimated that in 2025, Fresno County’s population was 1.035.456. It was also estimated that the county's population was 24,50% Non-Hispanic White, 55,68% Hispanic or Latino, 4,39% Non-Hispanic Black, 12,06% Asian, 0,57% Native American, 0,13% Pacific Islander, and 2,67% Multiracial.

Total	Population	Percentage
Non-Hispanic White	253.664	24,50%
Hispanic or Latino	576.575	55,68%
Non-Hispanic Black	45.500	4,39%
Asian	124.834	12,06%
Native American	5.932	0,57%
Pacific Islander	1.331	0,13%
Non-Hispanic Multiracial	27.620	2,67%

=== 2010 census ===
The 2010 United States census reported that Fresno County had a population of 930,450. The racial makeup of Fresno County was 515,145 (55.4%) White, 49,523 (5.3%) African American, 15,649 (1.7%) Native American, 89,357 (9.6%) Asian (3.3% Hmong, 1.7% Asian Indian, 1.0% Filipino, 0.8% Laotian, 0.6% Chinese, 0.5% Japanese, 0.5% Cambodian, 0.3% Vietnamese, 0.2% Korean, 0.1% Pakistani, 0.1% Thai), 1,405 (0.2%) Pacific Islander, 217,085 (23.3%) from other races, and 42,286 (4.5%) from two or more races. There were 468,070 Hispanic or Latino residents of any race (50.3%). 46.0% of Fresno County's population was of Mexican descent; 0.7% Salvadoran, and 0.3% of Puerto Rican origin.

Population reported at 2010 United States census
The County	Total; Population	White	African; American	Native; American	Asian	Pacific; Islander	other races	two or more races	Hispanic or Latino (of any race)
Fresno County	930,450	515,145	49,523	15,649	89,357	1,405	217,085	42,286	468,070
Incorporated cities	Total; Population	White	African; American	Native; American	Asian	Pacific; Islander	other races	two or more races	Hispanic or Latino (of any race)
Clovis	95,631	67,758	2,618	1,320	10,233	218	8,857	4,627	24,514
Coalinga	13,380	7,734	549	171	407	36	3,937	546	7,161
Firebaugh	7,549	4,715	70	116	40	0	2,371	237	6,887
Fowler	5,570	2,634	104	136	610	8	1,800	278	3,687
Fresno	494,665	245,306	40,960	8,525	62,528	849	111,984	24,513	232,055
Huron	6,754	2,300	66	77	39	6	3,964	302	6,527
Kerman	13,544	6,860	68	173	1,091	14	4,675	663	9,711
Kingsburg	11,382	8,576	62	146	383	21	1,706	488	4,883
Mendota	11,014	5,823	107	153	82	5	4,465	379	10,643
Orange Cove	9,078	3,940	72	131	101	3	4,481	350	8,413
Parlier	14,494	7,251	85	180	77	9	6,387	505	14,137
Reedley	24,194	14,105	169	267	797	8	7,850	998	18,455
San Joaquin	4,001	1,966	31	54	37	0	1,766	147	3,825
Sanger	24,270	14,454	219	311	758	39	7,645	844	19,537
Selma	23,219	12,869	284	479	1,057	9	7,630	891	18,014
Census-designated places	Total; Population	White	African; American	Native; American	Asian	Pacific; Islander	other races	two or more races	Hispanic or Latino (of any race)
Auberry	2,369	2,048	10	105	24	2	68	112	309
Big Creek	175	158	1	1	5	0	3	7	27
Biola	1,623	510	6	43	316	2	692	54	1,196
Bowles	166	108	6	1	1	0	43	7	71
Calwa	2,052	995	24	67	43	9	846	68	1,848
Cantua Creek	466	244	5	3	1	0	199	14	461
Caruthers	2,497	1,224	14	38	221	0	904	96	1,591
Centerville	392	321	1	9	20	0	33	8	99
Del Rey	1,639	740	7	11	34	0	814	33	1,534
Easton	2,083	1,248	13	58	68	0	593	103	1,308
Fort Washington	233	209	4	1	7	0	1	11	26
Friant	509	433	4	14	7	0	11	40	63
Lanare	589	181	57	5	2	0	300	44	519
Laton	1,824	1,001	4	13	10	0	744	52	1,393
Malaga	947	418	12	15	11	2	464	25	891
Mayfair	4,589	2,030	169	99	310	14	1,738	229	3,010
Minkler	1,003	818	4	20	23	0	108	30	302
Monmouth	152	82	6	1	5	0	47	11	107
Old Fig Garden	5,365	4,000	105	54	209	10	733	254	1,532
Raisin City	380	123	5	31	6	0	203	12	308
Riverdale	3,153	1,826	33	59	27	5	1,051	152	2,106
Shaver Lake	634	611	0	5	3	0	8	7	44
Squaw Valley	3,162	2,700	30	77	47	2	159	147	525
Sunnyside	4,235	2,687	176	58	467	6	640	201	1,525
Tarpey Village	3,888	2,868	77	59	261	3	452	168	1,219
Three Rocks	246	129	0	1	0	0	102	14	235
Tranquillity	799	504	9	13	2	0	251	20	637
West Park	1,157	602	32	32	54	1	370	66	879
Other unincorporated areas	Total; Population	White	African; American	Native; American	Asian	Pacific; Islander	other races	two or more races	Hispanic or Latino (of any race)
All others not CDPs (combined)	125,378	80,036	3,245	2,517	8,933	124	25,990	4,533	55,856

=== 2000 census ===
As of the census of 2000, there were 799,407 people, 252,940 households, and 186,669 families residing in the county. The population density was 134 people per square mile (52 people/km^{2}). There were 270,767 housing units at an average density of 45 per square mile (17/km^{2}). The racial makeup of the county was 54.3% White, 5.3% Black or African American, 1.6% Native American, 8.1% Asian, 0.1% Pacific Islander, 25.9% from other races, and 4.7% from two or more races. 44.0% of the population were Hispanic or Latino of any race. In terms of ancestry, the county was 7.5% German, 6.6% Irish, 6.3% English ancestry according to Census 2000. 59.3% spoke English, 31.5% Spanish and 3.1% Hmong as their first language.

There were 252,940 households, out of which 41.2% had children under the age of 18 living with them, 52.5% were married couples living together, 15.2% had a female householder with no husband present, and 26.2% were non-families. 20.6% of all households were made up of individuals, and 7.8% had someone living alone who was 65 years of age or older. The average household size was 3.09 and the average family size was 3.59.

In the county, the population was spread out, with 32.1% under the age of 18, 11.1% from 18 to 24, 28.5% from 25 to 44, 18.5% from 45 to 64, and 9.9% who were 65 years of age or older. The median age was 30 years. For every 100 females there were 100.4 males. For every 100 females age 18 and over, there were 98.2 males.

The median income for a household in the county was $34,725, and the median income for a family was $38,455. Males had a median income of $33,375 versus $26,501 for females. The per capita income for the county was $15,495. About 17.6% of families and 22.9% of the population were below the poverty line, including 31.7% of those under age 18 and 9.9% of those age 65 or over.

Fresno County is also known for having the highest rate of chlamydia in the state. In 2006 it had 545.2 cases per 100,000 people, compared with the statewide average of 363.5.

== Metropolitan Statistical Area ==
The United States Office of Management and Budget has designated Fresno County as the Fresno, CA Metropolitan Statistical Area. The United States Census Bureau ranked the Fresno, CA Metropolitan Statistical Area as the 56th most populous metropolitan statistical area of the United States as of July 1, 2012.

The Office of Management and Budget has further designated the Fresno, CA Metropolitan Statistical Area as a component of the more extensive Fresno–Madera, CA Combined Statistical Area, the 49th most populous combined statistical area and the 55th most populous primary statistical area of the United States as of July 1, 2012.

== Government and policing ==
=== Government ===
The Government of Fresno County is defined and authorized under the California Constitution, law, and the Charter of the County of Fresno. Much of the Government of California is in practice the responsibility of county governments, such as the Government of Fresno County. The County government provides countywide services such as elections and voter registration, law enforcement, jails, vital records, property records, tax collection, public health, and social services. In addition the County serves as the local government for all unincorporated areas.

The County government is composed of the elected five-member Board of Supervisors, several other elected offices including the Sheriff, District Attorney, Assessor-Recorder, Auditor-Controller/Treasurer-Tax Collector, and Clerk/Registrar of Voters, and numerous county departments and entities under the supervision of the County Administrator. As of January 2025, the members of the Fresno County Board of Supervisors are:

- Brian Pacheco, District 1
- Garry Bredefeld, District 2
- Luis Chavez, District 3
- Buddy Mendes, District 4
- Nathan Magsig, District 5

=== Policing ===
==== County Sheriff ====
The Fresno County Sheriff provides court protection, jail administration, and coroner services for all of Fresno County and its population of approximately of 994,400 residents. They operate the Fresno County Jail in downtown Fresno. The department provides police patrol and detective services for the unincorporated areas of the county which encompasses approximately 250,000 residents, or 25% of the county's total population. The department also provides law enforcement services by contract with the city of San Joaquin, population 4100.

==== Municipal police ====
Municipal police departments in the county are: Fresno, population 500,000; Clovis, 110,000; Sanger, 25,000; Reedley, 24,000; Selma, 23,000; Coalinga, 17,000; Kerman, 14,000; Kingsburg, 12,000; Huron, 7,000; Firebaugh, 8,500; Fowler, 6,500.

== Politics ==
=== Overview ===
Fresno County's voter registration shows a plurality of Democratic voters. Presidential elections have been competitive in recent decades. In 2020, Joe Biden became the first Democratic presidential candidate since Lyndon Johnson in 1964 to win over 51% of the vote in Fresno County, only for Donald Trump to become the first Republican in 20 years to win the county just four years after Biden's victory.

The cities of Clovis, Coalinga, and Kingsburg are considered solidly Republican, while the city of Fresno itself is split. The most Republican areas of Fresno are along the San Joaquin River bluffs, while southern Fresno itself is considered heavily Democratic. Most smaller cities in Fresno such as Firebaugh, Selma, and Sanger are split, with Democratic-leaning urban centers and Republican-leaning exteriors. Unincorporated Fresno County, as well as its mountain communities, are considered heavily Republican.

According to the California Secretary of State, in October 2012, there were 410,188 registered voters in Fresno County. 158,267 (38.6%) were registered Republican, 164,663 (40.1%) were registered Democratic, 19,841 (4.8%) are registered with other political parties, and 67,417 (16.4%) declined to state a political party. Republicans have a plurality or majority of voter roll registration in the cities of Clovis, Coalinga, Kingsburg, Reedley, and the unincorporated areas. The other cities and towns have Democratic pluralities or majorities.

From Fresno County's incorporation in 1856, it voted Democratic in every election until 1904, when President Theodore Roosevelt stood for re-election. Fresno County backed Roosevelt over his Democratic opponent Alton B. Parker. This did not immediately change the county's voting tendencies, however. It supported southern Democrat Woodrow Wilson in the elections of 1912 and 1916.

Fresno County was generally Republican from the onset of the "roaring 1920s" until the Great Depression, when President Franklin D. Roosevelt forged the New Deal Coalition that benefitted the agrarian county. From 1932 to 1976, the county consistently voted Democratic, barring Richard Nixon's landslide victory over former Senator George McGovern (D-SD) in 1972.

With President Jimmy Carter's defeat by Ronald Reagan, Fresno became a GOP-leaning swing county. It barely favored Reagan's successor (then) vice president George H. W. Bush in 1988. Fresno would narrowly vote Democratic for Bill Clinton in 1992, marking the first time that Democrats won the county since Jimmy Carter in 1976. Republicans won elections in Fresno County by increasing margins from 1996 to 2004, then again in 2024.

United States presidential election results for Fresno County, California (Note: This total comprised 8,839 votes for Progressive Theodore Roosevelt (who was official Republican nominee in California), 2,278 votes for Socialist Eugene V. Debs and 590 votes for Prohibition Party nominee Eugene W. Chafin.)
Year	Republican		Democratic		Third party(ies)	
Year	No.	%	No.	%	No.	%
1880	613	34.95%	1,133	64.60%	8	0.46%
1884	1,314	41.89%	1,704	54.32%	119	3.79%
1888	2,461	44.81%	2,822	51.38%	209	3.81%
1892	3,031	37.18%	3,453	42.35%	1,669	20.47%
1896	2,686	40.22%	3,790	56.75%	203	3.04%
1900	3,585	47.34%	3,590	47.41%	398	5.26%
1904	4,929	55.78%	2,815	31.86%	1,092	12.36%
1908	6,384	50.89%	4,743	37.81%	1,418	11.30%
1912	95	0.46%	8,891	42.96%	11,710	56.58%
1916	11,707	41.07%	14,241	49.95%	2,560	8.98%
1920	14,621	55.36%	9,613	36.39%	2,179	8.25%
1924	15,635	44.01%	4,610	12.98%	15,282	43.02%
1928	20,687	54.30%	16,884	44.32%	527	1.38%
1932	12,134	26.07%	32,528	69.90%	1,875	4.03%
1936	11,545	20.94%	42,859	77.75%	722	1.31%
1940	21,079	29.79%	48,866	69.07%	805	1.14%
1944	22,668	35.50%	40,769	63.84%	425	0.67%
1948	30,379	37.20%	47,762	58.49%	3,524	4.32%
1952	54,626	48.95%	56,135	50.30%	837	0.75%
1956	51,611	43.33%	67,234	56.44%	270	0.23%
1960	57,930	44.32%	72,164	55.21%	608	0.47%
1964	46,792	34.33%	89,375	65.57%	141	0.10%
1968	59,901	43.60%	65,153	47.42%	12,342	8.98%
1972	79,051	50.44%	72,682	46.38%	4,986	3.18%
1976	72,533	48.10%	74,958	49.71%	3,314	2.20%
1980	82,515	51.13%	65,254	40.43%	13,617	8.44%
1984	104,757	54.30%	86,315	44.74%	1,864	0.97%
1988	94,835	49.95%	92,635	48.79%	2,400	1.26%
1992	89,137	40.67%	92,418	42.17%	37,606	17.16%
1996	98,813	47.42%	94,448	45.32%	15,132	7.26%
2000	117,342	53.14%	95,059	43.05%	8,434	3.82%
2004	141,988	57.38%	103,154	41.68%	2,321	0.94%
2008	131,015	48.12%	136,706	50.21%	4,568	1.68%
2012	124,490	48.10%	129,129	49.89%	5,208	2.01%
2016	124,049	43.94%	141,341	50.06%	16,929	6.00%
2020	164,464	45.07%	193,025	52.90%	7,428	2.04%
2024	165,924	50.89%	151,628	46.50%	8,497	2.61%

In the United States House of Representatives, Fresno County is split among four congressional districts:

- California's 5th congressional district, represented by Republican Tom McClintock
- California's 13th congressional district, represented by Democrat Adam Gray
- California's 20th congressional district, represented by Republican Vince Fong
- California's 21st congressional district, represented by Democrat Jim Costa

In the California State Senate, the county is split among three legislative districts:

- the 12th senatorial district, represented by Republican Shannon Grove,
- the 14th senatorial district, represented by Democrat Anna Caballero, and
- the 16th senatorial district, represented by Democrat Melissa Hurtado.

In the California State Assembly, Fresno County is split among four legislative districts:

- the 8th Assembly district, represented by Republican David Tangipa,
- the 27th Assembly district, represented by Democrat Esmeralda Soria,
- the 31st Assembly district, represented by Democrat Joaquin Arambula, and
- the 33rd Assembly district, represented by Republican Alexandra Macedo.

Fresno tends to remain socially conservative but more moderate on economic issues, which can be seen in Fresno's support for both socially conservative proposition amendments and Democratic candidates in presidential elections, especially if economic times are poor. In contrast, gubernatorial elections are considered safe for Republicans in the county. It voted "Yes" in the 2021 gubernatorial recall election and has voted for the Republican gubernatorial candidate in every election since 1978.

On November 4, 2008, Fresno County voted 68.6% for Proposition 8, which amended the California Constitution to ban same-sex marriages.

=== Voter registration statistics ===
Population and registered voters
Total population	1,023,358	
Registered voters (Note: Percentage of registered voters with respect to total population. Percentages of party members with respect to registered voters follow.)	496,482	48.5%
Democratic	195,697	39.4%
Republican	161,696	32.6%
Democratic–Republican spread	+34,001	+6.8%
American Independent	16,558	3.3%
Green	1,462	0.3%
Libertarian	4,252	0.9%
Peace and Freedom	2,542	0.5%
Unknown	2,304	0.4%
Other	4,197	0.8%
No party preference	107,774	21.7%

==== Cities by population and voter registration ====
Cities by population and voter registration
City	Population	Registered voters	Democratic	Republican	D–R spread	Other	No party preference
Clovis	116,609	61.9%	29.8%	44.7%	-14.9%	6.5%	18.9%
Coalinga	16,944	34.1%	34.7%	32.5%	+2.2%	7.0%	25.7%
Firebaugh	7,980	37.7%	51.7%	15.9%	+35.8%	5.5%	26.8%
Fowler	6,220	57.7%	41.1%	38.4%	+2.7%	5.7%	24.9%
Fresno	542,012	48.5%	43.2%	27.2%	+16.0%	6.5%	23.1%
Huron	7,302	16.4%	57.4%	11.4%	+46.0%	5.4%	25.7%
Kerman	15,767	42.4%	43.6%	25.3%	+18.3%	6.9%	24.2%
Kingsburg	12,551	57.9%	24.6%	51.0%	-26.4%	6.3%	18.2%
Mendota	12,278	23.6%	60.7%	12.5%	+48.2	3.9%	22.9%
Orange Cove	9,460	33.2%	56.5%	13.4%	+43.1%	5.5%	24.5%
Parlier	15,658	30.3%	56.0%	13.0%	+43.0%	5.0%	26.0%
Reedley	25,873	40.1%	39.8%	32.7%	+7.1%	5.9%	21.7%
San Joaquin	4,144	23.8%	61.5%	8.7%	+52.8%	4.8%	25.0%
Sanger	27,005	46.0%	47.9%	25.1%	+22.8%	5.3%	21.7%
Selma	24,402	43.2%	45.1%	25.5%	+19.6%	5.8%	23.5%

== Crime ==
The following table includes the number of incidents reported and the rate per 1,000 persons for each type of offense.

Population and crime rates
Population	920,623	
Violent crime	4,694	5.10
Homicide	69	0.07
Forcible rape	178	0.19
Robbery	1,453	1.58
Aggravated assault	2,994	3.25
Property crime	20,071	21.80
Burglary	7,912	8.59
Larceny-theft (Note: Only larceny-theft cases involving property over $400 in value are reported as property crimes.)	21,749	23.62
Motor vehicle theft	5,491	5.96
Arson	491	0.53

== Economy ==
=== Agriculture ===
Agriculture is the primary industry in Fresno County. 1.88 million acres (0.76 million hectares; 7,600 square kilometres; 2,940 square miles) are under cultivation, almost half the total county area of 3.84 million acres (1.55 million hectares; 15,500 square kilometres; 6,000 square miles). Ag production totaled $7.98 billion in 2017, making it the number one agricultural county in the nation. Over 300 different crops are grown here. Major crops and livestocks include:

- Grapes (see also Grape in California)
- Pistachios
- Cotton
- Almonds
- Tomatoes (see also Tomato in California)
- Turkeys
- Cattle
- Milk
- Plums (see also Plum in California)
- Oranges
- Peaches (see also Peach in California)
- Nectarines (see also Nectarine in California)

The grape harvest brought in $1,046,356,645 in 2017. Production is chronically threatened by the presence of the Glassy-Winged Sharpshooter and the disease it carries, Pierce's Disease. See Glassy-Winged Sharpshooter in California and Pierce's Disease in California.

Pistachio production in the United States was 523,900 MT in 2021, with 40% of that number being from Fresno, California.

The peach harvest was worth $264,139,238 in 2017.

Fresno is the second highest cotton producer in the state, harvesting 223,443 bales in 2017. This is a close second to neighboring Kings.

Due to its tremendous agricultural success, the county also has a tremendous problem with glyphosate resistance. Okada et al., 2013 finds a high degree of resistance in Marestail (Conyza canadensis).

=== Companies based in Fresno County ===
- Gottschalks Department Stores (liquidated in 2010 )
- Sun-Maid Raisins
- Pinnacle Armor, maker of the Dragon Skin Body Armor
- Pelco, maker of surveillance cameras (acquired by Schneider Electric October 2007)
- David Sunflower Seeds, now part of ConAgra Foods
- Flicks Candy Company
- Harris Ranch Beef Company
- JD Food
- Saladino's Inc
- National Raisin Company
- Pacific Ethanol
- United Security Bank
- Central Valley Community Bank
- Electronic Recyclers International

=== Major employers ===
Commercial/Industrial

- Cargill
- Kraft Foods
- Foster Farms Dairy
- Foster Farms
- E & J Gallo Winery
- Del Monte Foods
- Pepsi Bottling Group
- PPG Industries
- Chevron
- Pelco
- Sun-Maid
- Electronic Recyclers International
- Saladino's Inc.
- Grundfos
- Amazon

Government

- Internal Revenue Service
- Caltrans
- Mendota Federal Prison
- Pleasant Valley State Prison
- Coalinga State Hospital
- 144th Fighter Wing of the California Air National Guard

Healthcare

- Children's Hospital Central California
- Community Medical Center - Clovis
- Community Regional Medical Center
- Coalinga Regional Medical Center
- Fresno Surgery Center
- Kaiser Foundation Hospital - Fresno
- Kingsburg Medical Center
- San Joaquin Valley Rehabilitation Hospital
- Saint Agnes Medical Center
- Sanger General Hospital
- Selma Community Hospital
- Sierra Kings Hospital - Reedley
- University Medical Center - Fresno
- VA Medical Center - Fresno

Nonprofits (community-based organizations)

- Fresno Regional Foundation
- Big Brothers Big Sisters
- Central California Legal Services
- Centro La Familia
- Comprehensive Youth Services
- Fresno Rescue Mission
- Marjaree Mason Center, Inc.
- Poverello House
- United Way, Fresno County
- Fresno Economic Opportunities Commission

== Education ==
=== Tertiary education ===
Educational institutions in Fresno County include:

- California State University, Fresno which opened in 1911.
- California Health Sciences University is a private university established in 2012. It currently offers a College of Pharmacy and College of Osteopathic Medicine and is committed to health sciences research and improving the access and delivery of quality health care in the San Joaquin Valley.
- San Joaquin College of Law is a private, nonprofit law school founded in 1969 and located in the City of Clovis.
- Fresno Pacific University is a private university in the City of Fresno.

Within the California Community Colleges System, Fresno County is mostly covered by the State Center Community College District and the West Hills Community College District. The following campuses are in Fresno County:

- Clovis Community College near the City of Clovis
- Fresno City College in the City of Fresno
- Reedley College in the City of Reedley
- West Hills College Coalinga in the City of Coalinga

=== K-12 education ===
School districts include:

K-12:

- Caruthers Unified School District - Covers some areas for PK-12 and some for 9–12 only
- Central Unified School District
- Clovis Unified School District
- Coalinga-Huron Unified School District
- Cutler-Orosi Joint Unified School District
- Dos Palos-Oro Loma Joint Unified School District
- Firebaugh-Las Deltas Unified School District
- Fowler Unified School District
- Fresno Unified School District
- Golden Plains Unified School District
- Kerman Unified School District
- Kings Canyon Joint Unified School District
- Laton Joint Unified School District
- Mendota Unified School District
- Parlier Unified School District
- Riverdale Joint Unified School District - Covers some areas for PK-12 and some for 9–12 only
- Sanger Unified School District
- Selma Unified School District
- Sierra Unified School District - Covers some areas for PK-12 and some for 9–12 only
- Washington Unified School District - Covers some areas for PK-12 and some for 9–12 only

Secondary:

- Kingsburg Joint Union High School District
- Dinuba Unified School District (while it is a unified school district, in this county it only covers areas for grades 9–12)

Elementary:

- Alvina Elementary School District
- Big Creek Elementary School District
- Burrel Union Elementary School District
- Clay Joint Elementary School District
- Kingsburg Elementary Charter School District
- Monroe Elementary School District
- Monson-Sultana Joint Union Elementary School District
- Orange Center Elementary School District
- Pacific Union Elementary School District
- Pine Ridge Elementary School District
- Raisin City Elementary School District
- Washington Colony Elementary School District
- West Park Elementary School District
- Westside Elementary School District

=== Public libraries ===
In addition, the Fresno County Public Library operates public libraries throughout the county.

== Transportation ==
=== Major highways ===
- Interstate 5
- State Route 33
- State Route 41
- State Route 43
- State Route 63
- State Route 99
- State Route 145
- State Route 168
- State Route 180
- State Route 198
- State Route 201
- State Route 245
- State Route 269

=== Rail ===
- BNSF Railway
- Union Pacific Railroad
- San Joaquin Valley Railroad
- Biola Branch (Southern Pacific) (abandoned)
- Shaver Lake Railroad (abandoned)
- San Joaquin and Eastern Railroad (abandoned)

=== Airports ===
Commercial service

- Fresno Yosemite Int'l Airport

General Aviation

- Fresno Chandler Executive Airport
- Firebaugh Airport
- Mendota Airport
- New Coalinga Municipal Airport
- Reedley Municipal Airport
- Sierra Sky Park Airport

=== Public transportation ===
- Fresno Area Express or FAX is the local bus operator in Fresno, including daily service to Fresno Yosemite International Airport.
- Clovis Transit Stageline is the bus service in Clovis.
- Reedley Transit a.k.a. Dial-A-Ride services Reedley.
- Fresno County Rural Transit Agency (FCRTA) offers a variety of local and intercity transit services around Fresno County.
- Greyhound, FlixBus, and Orange Belt Stages provide intercity, long-distance bus service.
- Amtrak Gold Runner stop in Fresno.

== Attractions ==
- China Peak Ski Resort
- Courtright Reservoir
- Dinkey Lakes Wilderness
- Fashion Fair Mall
- Forestiere Underground Gardens
- Fresno Art Museum
- Fresno Chaffee Zoo
- Fresno Fairgrounds
- Fresno Metropolitan Museum (dissolved January 2010)
- Fresno Water Tower
- Hume Lake
- Huntington Lake
- Kings Canyon National Park
- Lost Lake
- Millerton Lake
- Mount Darwin
- North Palisade
- Pine Flat Lake
- River Park
- Roeding Park
- Shaver Lake
- Sierra Vista Mall
- Simonian Farms
- William Saroyan Theatre
- Save Mart Center
- Wishon Reservoir
- Woodward Park

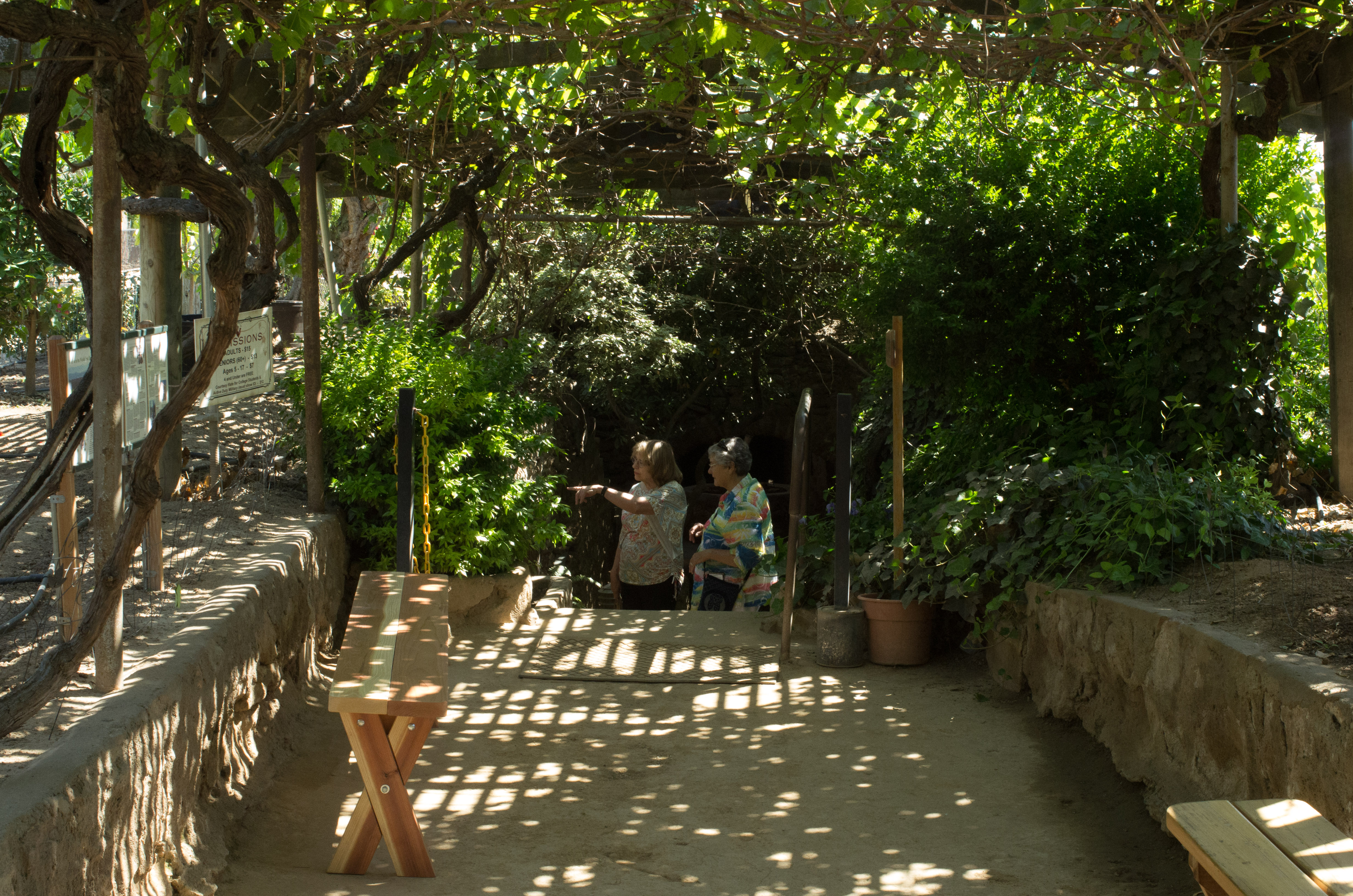
Forestiere Underground Garden

== Communities ==
=== Cities ===
- Clovis
- Coalinga
- Firebaugh
- Fowler
- Fresno (county seat)
- Huron
- Kerman
- Kingsburg
- Mendota
- Orange Cove
- Parlier
- Reedley
- San Joaquin
- Sanger
- Selma

=== Census-designated places ===
- Auberry
- Big Creek
- Biola
- Bowles
- Calwa
- Cantua Creek
- Caruthers
- Centerville
- Del Rey
- Easton
- Fort Washington
- Friant
- Lanare
- Laton
- Malaga
- Mayfair
- Millerton
- Minkler
- Monmouth
- Old Fig Garden
- Raisin City
- Riverdale
- Shaver Lake
- Yokuts Valley
- Sunnyside
- Tarpey Village
- Three Rocks
- Tranquillity
- West Park
- Westside

=== Unincorporated communities ===
- Burrel
- Dunlap
- Highway City
- Hume
- Mercey Hot Springs
- Prather
- Rolinda
- Tollhouse
- Oleander

=== Population ranking ===
The population ranking of the following table is based on the 2010 census of Fresno County.

† county seat

Rank	City/Town/etc.	Municipal type	Population (2010 Census)
1	† Fresno	City	494,665
2	Clovis	City	95,631
3	Sanger	City	24,270
4	Reedley	City	24,194
5	Selma	City	23,219
6	Parlier	City	14,494
7	Kerman	City	13,544
8	Coalinga	City	13,380
9	Kingsburg	City	11,382
10	Mendota	City	11,014
11	Orange Cove	City	9,078
12	Firebaugh	City	7,549
13	Huron	City	6,754
14	Fowler	City	5,570
15	Old Fig Garden	CDP	5,365
16	Mayfair	CDP	4,589
17	Sunnyside	CDP	4,235
18	San Joaquin	City	4,001
19	Tarpey Village	CDP	3,888
20	Yokuts Valley	CDP	3,162
21	Riverdale	CDP	3,153
22	Caruthers	CDP	2,497
23	Auberry	CDP	2,369
24	Easton	CDP	2,083
25	Calwa	CDP	2,052
26	Laton	CDP	1,824
27	Del Rey	CDP	1,639
28	Biola	CDP	1,623
29	West Park	CDP	1,157
30	Minkler	CDP	1,003
31	Malaga	CDP	947
32	Tranquillity	CDP	799
33	Shaver Lake	CDP	634
34	Lanare	CDP	589
35	Friant	CDP	509
36	Cantua Creek	CDP	466
37	Centerville	CDP	392
38	Raisin City	CDP	380
39	Three Rocks	CDP	246
40	Fort Washington	CDP	233
41	Cold Springs Rancheria	AIAN	184
42	Big Creek	CDP	175
43	Bowles	CDP	166
44	Monmouth	CDP	152
45	Big Sandy Rancheria	AIAN	118
46	Table Mountain Rancheria	AIAN	64

== See also ==
- Fresno County Library
- List of museums in the San Joaquin Valley
- List of school districts in Fresno County, California
- National Register of Historic Places listings in Fresno County, California
