= Sunnyside, Fresno County, California =

Sunnyside
- census-designated place
- Location in Fresno County and the state of California

- Location in California
- Coordinates: 36°44′57″N 119°41′58″W
- Country: United States
- State: California
- County: Fresno

Area
  - Total: 1.913 sq mi (4.955 km^{2})
  - Land: 1.913 sq mi (4.955 km^{2})
  - Water: 0 sq mi (0 km^{2}) 0%
- Elevation: 330 ft (100 m)

Population (2020)
  - Total: 4,627
  - Density: 2,419/sq mi (933.8/km^{2})
- Time zone: UTC-8 (Pacific (PST))
  - Summer (DST): UTC-7 (PDT)
- GNIS feature IDs: 1659922; 2583154

Sunnyside (formerly Maltermoro) is a census-designated place in Fresno County, California, United States. It is located on the Southern Pacific Railroad 5 miles (8 km) north-northeast of Malaga, at an elevation of 328 ft (100 m). It is an eastern suburb of Fresno. At the 2020 census, Sunnyside's population was 4,627.

The Maltermoro post office operated from 1894 to 1913. The name honored postmaster George H. Malter.

== Demographics ==
Historical population
Census	Pop.	Note	%±
2010	4,235		—
2020	4,627		9.3%
U.S. Decennial Census; 2010

Sunnyside first appeared as a census designated place in the 2010 U.S. census.

The 2020 United States census reported that Sunnyside had a population of 4,627. The population density was 2,418.7 inhabitants per square mile (933.9/km^{2}). The racial makeup of Sunnyside was 41.2% White, 3.2% African American, 2.1% Native American, 14.6% Asian, 0.0% Pacific Islander, 22.2% from other races, and 16.7% from two or more races. Hispanic or Latino of any race were 43.6% of the population.

The whole population lived in households. There were 1,528 households, out of which 33.6% included children under the age of 18, 56.1% were married-couple households, 6.2% were cohabiting couple households, 23.9% had a female householder with no partner present, and 13.8% had a male householder with no partner present. 19.1% of households were one person, and 11.9% were one person aged 65 or older. The average household size was 3.03. There were 1,186 families (77.6% of all households).

The age distribution was 24.0% under the age of 18, 8.2% aged 18 to 24, 23.0% aged 25 to 44, 24.0% aged 45 to 64, and 20.8% who were 65 years of age or older. The median age was 40.4 years. For every 100 females, there were 93.5 males.

There were 1,596 housing units at an average density of 834.3 units per square mile (322.1 units/km^{2}), of which 1,528 (95.7%) were occupied. Of these, 79.3% were owner-occupied, and 20.7% were occupied by renters.

== Education ==
Most of Sunnyside is served by the Fresno Unified School District; A portion is within the Sanger Unified School District.
