= Pacific Union School District (Fresno County, California) =

School district in California, United States

Address
- 2065 East Bowles Avenue Fresno, California, 93725; United States

District information
- Type: Public
- Grades: K–8
- Schools: 1 elementary
- NCES District ID: 0629400

Students and staff
- Students: 354
- Teachers: 19.0 (FTE)
- Staff: 21.5 (FTE)
- Student–teacher ratio: 18.63:1

Other information
- Website: www.pacificunion.k12.ca.us

Pacific Union School District is a public school district in Fresno County, California, United States. The district has a Fresno address, but serves an unincorporated area around the communities of Bowles and Oleander. The district operates a single K-8 school that feeds to Washington Union High School.
