= List of killings by law enforcement officers in the United States, January 2011 =

This is a list of people reported killed by non-military law enforcement officers in the United States in January 2011, whether in the line of duty or not, and regardless of reason or method. The listing documents the occurrence of a death, making no implications regarding wrongdoing or justification on the part of the person killed or officer involved. Killings are arranged by date of the incident that caused death. Different death dates, if known, are noted in the description. The table below lists 42 people.

== January 2011 ==
| Date | Name (Age) of Deceased | State (city) | Description |
|---|---|---|---|
| 2011-01-31 | Quiles, Pedro (26) | Florida (Tampa) | |
| 2011-01-30 | Trujillo, Claudio (24) | Texas (Amarillo) | |
| 2011-01-30 | Curler, John A | Washington (Spokane) | Died from injuries after being struck by police cruiser. Curler was cross an intersection on foot as the officer was responding to a "trouble unknown" report with lights and siren off. |
| 2011-01-30 | Cisneros, Yueri Acevedo | Washington (Yakima) | Shot after refusing to stop stabbing another man on the ground. The victim was stabbed 159 times with a pocketknife. |
| 2011-01-30 | Sliger, Edward (54) | Florida (Largo) | |
| 2011-01-29 | Cicelski, Matthew (39) | California (Oakland) | |
| 2011-01-28 | O'Connell, Robert David | Washington (Tacoma) | Shot after shooting three times at police. Officers were approaching man for acting suspiciously at a gas station. |
| 2011-01-28 | Unnamed man | Maryland (Takoma Park) | |
| 2011-01-28 | Unnamed man | Pennsylvania (Philadelphia) | |
| 2011-01-27 | Unnamed teen (16) | California (Garden Grove) | |
| 2011-01-25 | Unnamed man | California (San Jose) | |
| 2011-01-25 | Victor Cataquet (28) | Pennsylvania (Reading) | |
| 2011-01-24 | Lacy Jr., Hydra | Florida (St. Petersburg) | Shot after fatally shooting two police officers, Thomas John "Tom" Baitinger and Jeffrey Adam Yaslowitz, who were serving an arrest warrant for aggravated battery and two other felony charges. |
| 2011-01-24 | Robert Kendrick Chambers | Georgia (Warner Robins) | Shot while attempting to pull a weapon out of a coat pocket. The man was approached as a possible suspect in a recent burglary. When the man was ordered to remove his hands from his pockets a scuffle ensued. |
| 2011-01-23 | Fuller, Norman | Tennessee (Memphis) | Shot after pointing gun at police. Police were responding to report of a shooting and encountered the armed Fuller walking down the street. |
| 2011-01-23 | Unnamed man | Michigan (Detroit) | |
| 2011-01-22 | Unnamed man | California (Oakland) | |
| 2011-01-22 | Sloan, Latricka | Georgia (Decatur County) | Died from injuries following police use of a PIT maneuver on Sloan's vehicle. Sloan had made a U-turn after approaching a police safety check point. Witness report Sloan was not driving fast. Police later determined that Sloan was not licensed to drive in Georgia. |
| 2011-01-22 | Sebasco, Osmar (39) | Florida (Tampa) | |
| 2011-01-20 | Jerome Thompkins (35) | North Carolina (Durham) | |
| 2011-01-20 | Simms, Johnny (22) | Miami-Dade County, Florida | Died in a shootout that also killed two Miami-Dade Police Department detectives, Amanda Lynn Haworth and Roger Castillo. |
| 2011-01-20 | Randy Wagoner (41) | Indiana (South Bend) | |
| 2011-01-16 | Dennis, Kenneth | Washington (Spokane) | Shot during investigation of report of domestic violence. Police report Dennis was armed with a knife. |
| 2011-01-16 | Unnamed man | California (Garden Grove) | |
| 2011-01-16 | Unnamed man (18) | California (Santa Ana) | |
| 2011-01-15 | Landry, Andrew | Maine (Lyman) | Shot after brandishing two knives. Officers were responding to a call for assistance and first attempted to disarm Landry with a Taser. |
| 2011-01-14 | Ramirez Castellanos, Felipe (43) | Arizona (Mesa) | |
| 2011-01-14 | Reggie Doucet (25) | California (Los Angeles) | Shot after repeatedly striking police officers and attempting to take their guns. Police were responding to a disturbing the peace call after Doucet had removed his clothes and was running around naked. In December 2016 the City of Los Angeles settled with Doucet's family for $1.65 million. |
| 2011-01-13 | Perez, Enrique (21) | California (Malaga) | Thursday, about 8 AM, an officer of the California Highway Patrol was investigating the theft of a dump truck near Malaga. The officer found the truck in a citrus grove. The suspect came out of the grove and fought with the officer. The officer was able to pull his weapon and shot the suspect, who was later identified as Enrique Perez of Fresno. |
| 2011-01-12 | Carter, Sheri (29) | Florida (Boynton Beach) | |
| 2011-01-11 | Stamps, Eurie (68) | Massachusetts (Framingham) | Middlesex District Attorney Gerry Leone testified Officer Paul Duncan's rifle went off accidentally, killing Stamps who was handcuffed and lying facedown in his home during a midnight SWAT raid. Police were searching for his stepson and Stamps was not a suspect. |
| 2011-01-08 | Taylor, Rudy (50) | Florida (Madison) | |
| 2011-01-07 | Pinex, Darius L. | Illinois (Chicago) | Shot in vehicle after dragging police officer with vehicle. Police had stopped Pinex because he was driving a vehicle similar to one implicated in earlier gunfire. |
| 2011-01-07 | Unnamed teen | Illinois (Aurora) | |
| 2011-01-06 | Fox, Andrew (25) | Washington (Bellevue) | Shot as approaching officer with knife raised in overhand grip. Police were responding to report of a hostage taking at a gas station. |
| 2011-01-05 | Eurie Stamps (68) | Massachusetts (Framingham) | |
| 2011-01-05 | Serrato, Roger | California (Greenfield) | Serrato died after a SWAT team through a flash grenade into his house, which landed on a couch and sparked a fire. Officers had come to Serrato's house mistakenly believing he was connected to a shooting at a New Year's party. SWAT members started to approach the house, but stopped when they saw Serrato. Serrato died due to asphyxiation from smoke inhalation. |
| 2011-01-05 | Unnamed man (33) | New Jersey (Camden) | |
| 2011-01-02 | Unnamed man | California (Los Angeles) | |
| 2011-01-02 | Higginbotham, Thomas (67) | Oregon (Portland) | |
| 2011-01-01 | Ferryman, Michael (57) | Ohio (Enon) | Shot during a shootout with police, prior to which he had shot and killed Deputy Suzanne Hopper. |
| 2011-01-01 | Weatherspoon, Lynn | Florida (Miami) | Shot after fleeing SWAT team and reportedly pointing gun at them. The SWAT team was inside a black SUV and noted that Weatherspoon was armed with a handgun. Witnesses report that men jumped out of the SUV and opened fire as Weatherspoon ran away. |

== Known erroneous reports ==
This section includes deaths which were initially reported as police killings but later turned out not to be.

| Date | Name | State (City) | Initial reports | Later reports |
|---|---|---|---|---|
| 2011-01-23 | Martinez, Anthony | Washington (Port Orchard) | Shot after shooting at and wounding two deputies. The deputies were responding to report of suspicious man with a gun outside a store. Astrid Valdivia died from gunshot wound received in crossfire between deputies and Martinez. | All three deputies and Martinez were firing .40 caliber hollow-point rounds from Glock handguns, which led to confusion over who shot whom and multiple erroneous reports that a deputy had killed Martinez. Later forensics determined that Martinez killed Valdivia and then himself. |

== See also ==
- Death in custody § United States
- Henry A. Wallace Police Crime Public Database
- List of cases of police brutality
- List of countries with annual rates and counts for killings by law enforcement officers
- List of law enforcement officers killed in the line of duty in the United States
- List of law enforcement officers convicted for an on-duty killing in the United States
- List of police reforms related to the George Floyd protests
- List of unarmed African Americans killed by law enforcement officers in the United States
- Lists of killings by law enforcement officers
- Police brutality in the United States
- Police misconduct § United States
- Police riot § United States
- Police use of deadly force in the United States
