= Clovis Unified School District =

School district in California, United States

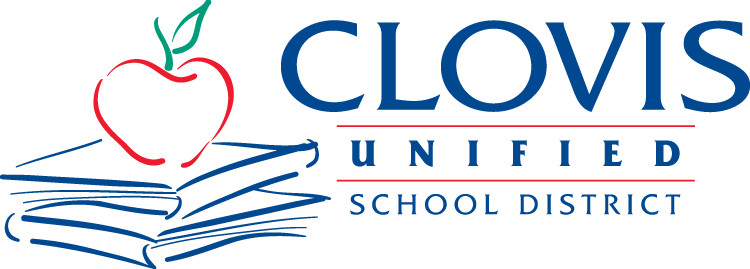

Address
- 1450 Herndon Avenue Clovis, California, 93611; United States
- Coordinates: 36°50′13″N 119°41′25″W

District information
- Type: Public
- Grades: K–12
- Established: 1959
- Superintendent: Corrine Folmer, Ed.D.
- Deputy superintendent(s): Norm Anderson
- School board: Hugh Awtrey (President); Yolanda Moore (Vice President); Clinton Olivier (Clerk); Deena Combs-Flores; David DeFrank; Steven G. Fogg, M.D.; Tiffany Stoker Madsen
- Schools: 49
- NCES District ID: 0609030
- District ID: CA-1062117

Students and staff
- Students: 42,802
- Teachers: 1,855.89 (FTE)
- Staff: 2,494.61
- Student–teacher ratio: 23.06

Other information
- Website: www.cusd.com

Clovis Unified School District is a public school system located in Clovis, California, with its headquarters located at 1450, Herndon Avenue, Clovis. Its 49 schools serve a student population of nearly 43,000 students in a geographic area covering about 198 sq mi (510 km^{2}). The district includes almost all of the City of Clovis along with a portion of the City of Fresno, extending to the community of Friant and some of unincorporated eastern Fresno County. It additionally includes Tarpey Village, Fort Washington, and most of Millerton.

A new educational center has broken ground in October, 2023. It will include three new schools: Clovis South High School, Phillip V. Sanchez Intermediate, and an unnamed elementary school. The new educational center will have a phased opening starting in Fall 2025.

It is one of the few non-union school districts in California, unlike the nearby Sanger and Fresno school districts.

The current superintendent is Corrine Folmer, Ed.D.

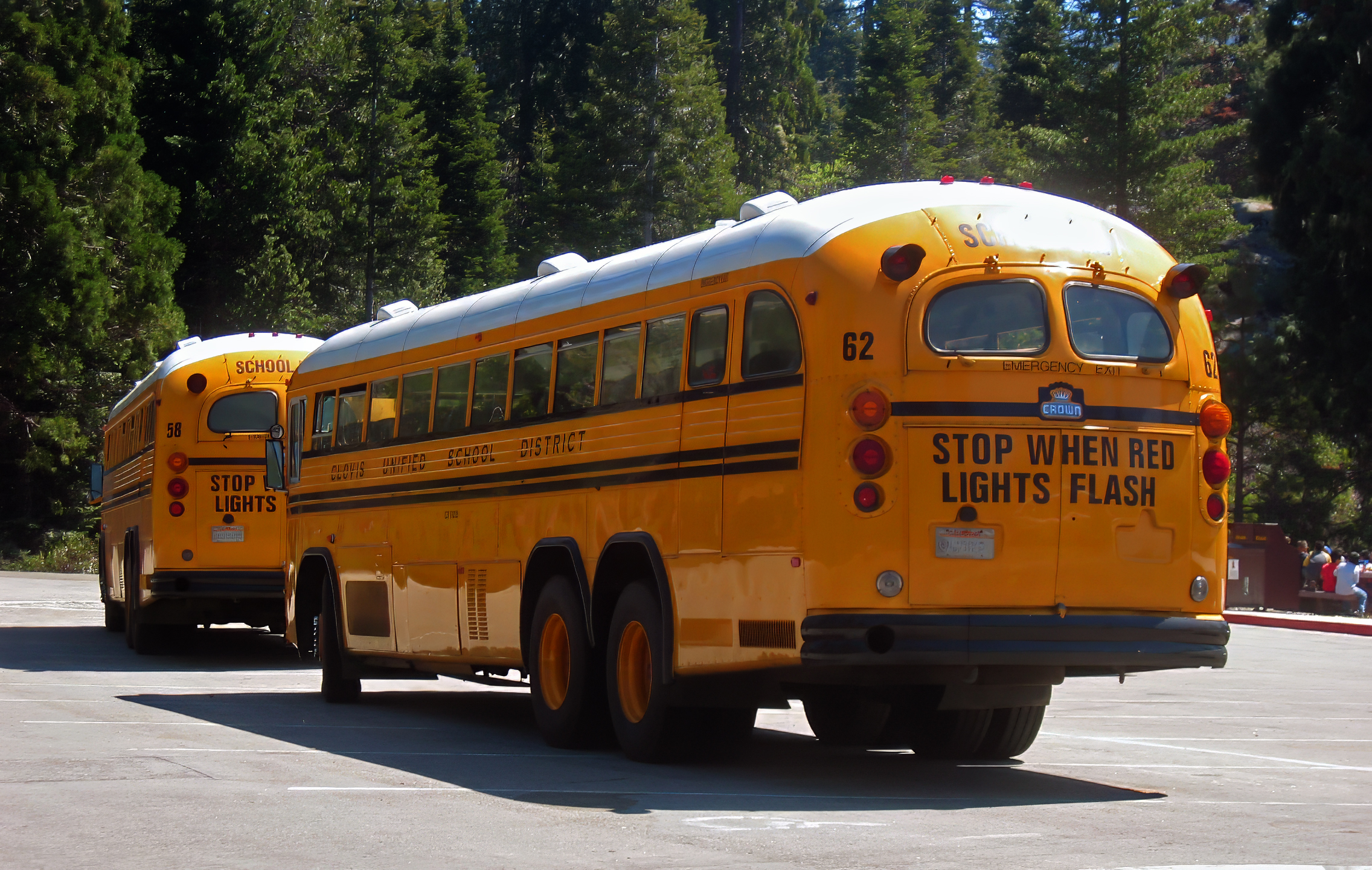
Clovis Unified School District Crown Supercoach school buses in Kings Canyon National Park, in 2005.

== Schools ==
=== Elementary, Intermediate, & High Schools ===
Each Clovis Unified high school (9-12 grades) has an accompanying intermediate school (7-8 grades) with several feeder elementary schools (K-6 grades).

List of all high schools and their feeder intermediate and elementary schools:

==== Clovis High Area ====
- Clovis High
- Clark Intermediate
- Cedarwood Elementary
- Clovis Elementary
- Mickey Cox Elementary
- Jefferson Elementary
- Red Bank Elementary
- Sierra Vista Elementary
- Weldon Elementary

==== Clovis West Area ====
- Clovis West High
- Kastner Intermediate
- Fort Washington Elementary
- Liberty Elementary
- Lincoln Elementary
- Maple Creek Elementary
- Nelson Elementary
- Pinedale Elementary
- Valley Oak Elementary

==== Clovis North Area ====
- Clovis North High
- Granite Ridge Intermediate
- Bud Rank Elementary
- Copper Hills Elementary
- Fugman Elementary
- Mountain View Elementary
- Riverview Elementary

==== Clovis East Area ====
- Clovis East High School
- Reyburn Intermediate
- Freedom Elementary
- Gettysburg Elementary
- Miramonte Elementary
- Oraze Elementary
- Reagan Elementary

=== Clovis South Area ===
- Clovis South High School
- Phillip V. Sanchez Intermediate School
- Boris Elementary
- Fancher Creek Elementary
- Hirayama Elementary
- Temperance-Kutner Elementary
- Young Elementary

==== Buchanan Area ====
- Buchanan High School
- Alta Sierra Intermediate
- Century Elementary
- Cole Elementary
- Dry Creek Elementary
- Garfield Elementary
- Tarpey Elementary
- Woods Elementary

=== Alternative Education Schools ===
- Community Day
- Gateway High School
- Enterprise High School

=== Other Schools ===
- Center for Advanced Research and Technology (CART)
- Clovis Adult Education
- Clovis Online School
- Sierra Outdoor School
