= Q84 =

Q84 may refer to:

- Q84 (New York City bus)
- Al-Inshiqaq, a surah of the Quran
- French submarine Joule (Q84)
- William Robert Johnston Municipal Airport, in Fresno County, California, United States
