= Fort Washington, California =

Fort Washington
- census-designated place
- Location of Fort Washington in Fresno County, California.

- Position in California.
- Coordinates: 36°52′45″N 119°45′41″W
- Country: United States
- State: California
- County: Fresno

Area
  - Total: 0.124 sq mi (0.321 km^{2})
  - Land: 0.124 sq mi (0.321 km^{2})
  - Water: 0 sq mi (0 km^{2}) 0%
- Elevation: 367 ft (112 m)

Population (2020)
  - Total: 255
  - Density: 2,060/sq mi (794/km^{2})
- Time zone: UTC-8 (Pacific (PST))
  - Summer (DST): UTC-7 (PDT)
- GNIS feature ID: 2583015

Fort Washington is a census-designated place in Fresno County, California, United States. Fort Washington sits at an elevation of 249 feet (76 m). The 2020 United States census reported Fort Washington's population as 255.

== Demographics ==
Historical population
Census	Pop.	Note	%±
2010	233		—
2020	255		9.4%
U.S. Decennial Census; 2010

Fort Washington first appeared as a census designated place in the 2010 U.S. census.

The 2020 United States census reported that Fort Washington had a population of 255. The population density was 2,056.5 inhabitants per square mile (794.0/km^{2}). The racial makeup of Fort Washington was 210 (82.4%) White, 2 (0.8%) African American, 5 (2.0%) Native American, 3 (1.2%) Asian, 0 (0.0%) Pacific Islander, 4 (1.6%) from other races, and 31 (12.2%) from two or more races. Hispanic or Latino of any race were 46 persons (18.0%).

The whole population lived in households. There were 98 households, out of which 32 (32.7%) had children under the age of 18 living in them, 70 (71.4%) were married-couple households, 2 (2.0%) were cohabiting couple households, 19 (19.4%) had a female householder with no partner present, and 7 (7.1%) had a male householder with no partner present. 14 households (14.3%) were one person, and 10 (10.2%) were one person aged 65 or older. The average household size was 2.60. There were 82 families (83.7% of all households).

The age distribution was 62 people (24.3%) under the age of 18, 16 people (6.3%) aged 18 to 24, 49 people (19.2%) aged 25 to 44, 56 people (22.0%) aged 45 to 64, and 72 people (28.2%) who were 65 years of age or older. The median age was 45.1 years. For every 100 females, there were 96.2 males.

There were 108 housing units at an average density of 871.0 units per square mile (336.3 units/km^{2}), of which 98 (90.7%) were occupied. Of these, 91 (92.9%) were owner-occupied, and 7 (7.1%) were occupied by renters.

== Education ==
Fort Washington is served by the Clovis Unified School District.

Its zoned schools are Liberty Elementary School, Kastner Intermediate School, and Clovis West High School.
