= Monmouth, California =

Monmouth
- Census designated place
- Location in Fresno County and the state of California

- Location in California
- Coordinates: 36°33′58″N 119°44′24″W
- Country: United States
- State: California
- County: Fresno

Area
  - Total: 0.308 sq mi (0.798 km^{2})
  - Land: 0.308 sq mi (0.798 km^{2})
  - Water: 0 sq mi (0 km^{2}) 0%
- Elevation: 276 ft (84 m)

Population (2020)
  - Total: 120
  - Density: 390/sq mi (150/km^{2})
- Time zone: UTC-8 (Pacific)
  - Summer (DST): UTC-7 (PDT)
- ZIP code: 93725
- Area code: 559
- GNIS feature IDs: 1656172, 2628758

Monmouth is a census-designated place in Fresno County, California, United States. It is located 7.25 miles (12 km) west of Selma, at an elevation of 276 feet (84 m). At the 2020 census, Monmouth had a population of 120.

Officials of the Atchison, Topeka and Santa Fe Railroad (Monmouth was a stop on the railroad's Valley Division) named the place after Monmouth, Illinois.

A post office operated at Monmouth from 1908 to 1919.

== Demographics ==
Historical population
Census	Pop.	Note	%±
2010	152		—
2020	120		−21.1%
U.S. Decennial Census; 2010

Monmouth first appeared as a census designated place in the 2010 U.S. census.

The 2020 United States census reported that Monmouth had a population of 120. The population density was 389.6 inhabitants per square mile (150.4/km^{2}). The racial makeup of Monmouth was 47 (39.2%) White, 1 (0.8%) African American, 6 (5.0%) Native American, 1 (0.8%) Asian, 0 (0.0%) Pacific Islander, 43 (35.8%) from other races, and 22 (18.3%) from two or more races. Hispanic or Latino of any race were 81 persons (67.5%).

The whole population lived in households. There were 33 households, out of which 19 (57.6%) had children under the age of 18 living in them, 14 (42.4%) were married-couple households, 2 (6.1%) were cohabiting couple households, 11 (33.3%) had a female householder with no partner present, and 6 (18.2%) had a male householder with no partner present. 9 households (27.3%) were one person, and 5 (15.2%) were one person aged 65 or older. The average household size was 3.64. There were 23 families (69.7% of all households).

The age distribution was 24 people (20.0%) under the age of 18, 16 people (13.3%) aged 18 to 24, 32 people (26.7%) aged 25 to 44, 24 people (20.0%) aged 45 to 64, and 24 people (20.0%) who were 65 years of age or older. The median age was 36.2 years. There were 62 males and 58 females.

There were 33 housing units at an average density of 107.1 units per square mile (41.4 units/km^{2}), which were all occupied, 17 (51.5%) by homeowners, and 16 (48.5%) by renters.
