= Calwa, California =

Calwa
- Unincorporated community Census-designated place
- Location in Fresno County and the state of California

- Location in the United States
- Coordinates: 36°42′38″N 119°45′31″W
- Country: United States
- State: California
- County: Fresno

Government
  - State Senator: Anna Caballero (D)
  - State Assembly: Joaquin Arambula (D)
  - U. S. Congress: Jim Costa (D)

Area
  - Total: 0.58 sq mi (1.50 km^{2})
  - Land: 0.57 sq mi (1.47 km^{2})
  - Water: 0.012 sq mi (0.03 km^{2}) 1.99%
- Elevation: 292 ft (89 m)

Population (2020)
  - Total: 1,776
  - Density: 3,129.0/sq mi (1,208.12/km^{2})
- Time zone: UTC-8 (PST)
  - Summer (DST): UTC-7 (PDT)
- ZIP codes: 93725, 93745
- Area code: 559
- FIPS code: 06-10032
- GNIS feature IDs: 1655859, 2582958

Calwa (formerly, Calwa City) is an unincorporated community and census-designated place (CDP) in Fresno County, California, United States. The population was 1,776 at the 2020 census, down from 2,052 at the 2010 census. Calwa is located 4 miles (6.4 km) south-southeast of downtown Fresno, at an elevation of 292 feet (89 m). The name was taken from the acronym for "California Wine Association" (CalWA).

== Geography ==
According to the United States Census Bureau, the community has a total area of 0.6 square miles (1.6 km^{2}), of which 98.01% is land and 1.99% is water. Calwa is an almost complete county island surrounded by the city of Fresno on all sides except the southeast corner.

== History ==
In 1885, the land of what is now Calwa, was improved and cultivated by Hugh William La Rue to plant an orchard and vineyard. His first crop was ruined by a grasshopper pest in 1886 and he sought to plant elsewhere. Calwa became a railroad town when Santa Fe Railways invested one million dollars to build a switching yard and houses for railway employees. Southern Pacific Railroad also passed through Calwa. The Calwa City post office opened in 1913, and changed its name to Calwa in 1949.

== Demographics ==
Historical population
Census	Pop.	Note	%±
2010	2,052		—
2020	1,776		−13.5%
U.S. Decennial Census; 2010 2020

Calwa first appeared as a census designated place in the 2010 U.S. census. An existing CDP using the same name was renamed Malaga after the U.S. Census Bureau determined that it had been incorrectly named. There previously was a CDP named Calwa first listed as an unincorporated community in the 1970 U.S. census (pop 5,191) and as a CDP in the 1980 United States census (pop. 6,640) which was annexed by the city of Fresno prior to the 1990 U.S. census.

=== Racial and ethnic composition ===
Calwa CDP, California – Racial and ethnic composition Note: the US Census treats Hispanic/Latino as an ethnic category. This table excludes Latinos from the racial categories and assigns them to a separate category. Hispanics/Latinos may be of any race.
Race / Ethnicity (NH = Non-Hispanic)	Pop 2010	Pop 2020	% 2010	% 2020
White alone (NH)	92	67	4.48%	3.77%
Black or African American alone (NH)	23	35	1.12%	1.97%
Native American or Alaska Native alone (NH)	26	16	1.27%	0.90%
Asian alone (NH)	37	50	1.80%	2.82%
Native American or Alaska Native alone (NH)	9	1	0.44%	0.06%
Other race alone (NH)	3	0	0.15%	0.00%
Mixed race or Multiracial (NH)	14	6	0.68%	0.34%
Hispanic or Latino (any race)	1,848	1,601	90.06%	90.15%
Total	2,052	1,776	0.00%	0.00%

=== 2020 census ===
As of the 2020 census, Calwa had a population of 1,776. The population density was 3,126.8 inhabitants per square mile (1,207.3/km^{2}).

The census reported that 1,768 people (99.5% of the population) lived in households, 8 (0.5%) lived in non-institutionalized group quarters, and no one was institutionalized. 100.0% of residents lived in urban areas, while 0.0% lived in rural areas.

There were 448 households, out of which 217 (48.4%) had children under the age of 18 living in them. Of all households, 188 (42.0%) were married-couple households, 50 (11.2%) were cohabiting couple households, 117 (26.1%) had a female householder with no spouse or partner present, and 93 (20.8%) had a male householder with no spouse or partner present. About 65 households (14.5%) were made up of individuals, and 20 (4.5%) had someone living alone who was 65 years of age or older. The average household size was 3.95, and there were 352 families (78.6% of all households).

The age distribution was 551 people (31.0%) under the age of 18, 226 people (12.7%) aged 18 to 24, 523 people (29.4%) aged 25 to 44, 333 people (18.8%) aged 45 to 64, and 143 people (8.1%) who were 65 years of age or older. The median age was 29.0 years. For every 100 females, there were 108.9 males, and for every 100 females age 18 and over, there were 105.5 males age 18 and over.

There were 474 housing units at an average density of 834.5 units per square mile (322.2 units/km^{2}), of which 448 (94.5%) were occupied and 26 (5.5%) were vacant. Of the occupied units, 173 (38.6%) were owner-occupied and 275 (61.4%) were occupied by renters. The homeowner vacancy rate was 1.7%, and the rental vacancy rate was 1.4%.

== Transportation ==
Calwa is served by Fresno Area Express buses.

== Education ==
Calwa is served by the Fresno Unified School District.

Zoned schools include Calwa Elementary School, Sequoia Middle School, and Roosevelt High School.
