= Old Fig Garden, California =

Old Fig Garden
- census-designated place
- Location in Fresno County and the state of California

- Location in California
- Coordinates: 36°47′54″N 119°48′16″W
- Country: United States
- State: California
- County: Fresno

Area
  - Total: 1.667 sq mi (4.318 km^{2})
  - Land: 1.667 sq mi (4.318 km^{2})
  - Water: 0 sq mi (0 km^{2}) 0%
- Elevation: 312 ft (95 m)

Population (2020)
  - Total: 5,477
  - Density: 3,285/sq mi (1,268/km^{2})
- Time zone: UTC-8 (Pacific (PST))
  - Summer (DST): UTC-7 (PDT)
- GNIS feature IDs: 2112675; 2583103

Old Fig Garden (formerly Fig Garden) is a census-designated place in Fresno County, California, United States. It lies at an elevation of 312 feet (95 m). The city of Fresno, through annexations, has entirely encircled Fig Garden. Old Fig Garden's population was 5,477 at the 2020 census.

== Demographics ==
Historical population
Census	Pop.	Note	%±
2010	5,365		—
2020	5,477		2.1%
U.S. Decennial Census; 2010

Old Fig Garden first appeared as a census designated place in the 2010 U.S. census.

=== 2020 census ===
As of the 2020 census, Old Fig Garden had a population of 5,477 and a population density of 3,285.5 inhabitants per square mile (1,268.5/km^{2}). The median age was 42.4 years. The age distribution was 21.2% under the age of 18, 7.4% aged 18 to 24, 24.6% aged 25 to 44, 25.6% aged 45 to 64, and 21.3% aged 65 or older. For every 100 females, there were 97.7 males, and for every 100 females age 18 and over there were 95.4 males age 18 and over.

The census reported that 99.4% of the population lived in households, 0.6% lived in non-institutionalized group quarters, and no one was institutionalized. The area was entirely urban, with 100.0% of residents living in urban areas and 0.0% in rural areas.

Racial composition as of the 2020 census
Race	Number	Percent
White	3,286	60.0%
Black or African American	149	2.7%
American Indian and Alaska Native	102	1.9%
Asian	287	5.2%
Native Hawaiian and Other Pacific Islander	5	0.1%
Some other race	776	14.2%
Two or more races	872	15.9%
Hispanic or Latino (of any race)	1,840	33.6%

There were 2,160 households, out of which 28.2% had children under the age of 18 living in them. Of all households, 47.5% were married-couple households, 7.5% were cohabiting couple households, 18.9% had a male householder with no spouse or partner present, and 26.1% had a female householder with no spouse or partner present. About 24.7% of all households were made up of individuals, and 13.2% had someone living alone who was 65 years of age or older. The average household size was 2.52. There were 1,483 families (68.7% of all households).

There were 2,292 housing units at an average density of 1,374.9 units per square mile (530.9 units/km^{2}), of which 2,160 (94.2%) were occupied. Of the occupied units, 69.9% were owner-occupied and 30.1% were occupied by renters. The vacancy rate was 5.8%, including a homeowner vacancy rate of 1.4% and a rental vacancy rate of 5.0%.

== Education ==
The CDP is served by the Fresno Unified School District.

The bulk of the CDP is zoned to Powers-Ginsburg Elementary School, Wawona K-8 School's middle school program, and Bullard High School. A very small piece to the south of Ashlan and east of Maroa is zoned to Del Mar Elementary, Fort Miller Middle, and Fresno High School.
