= Fresno County Public Library =

Public library system located in Fresno, California

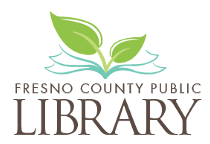

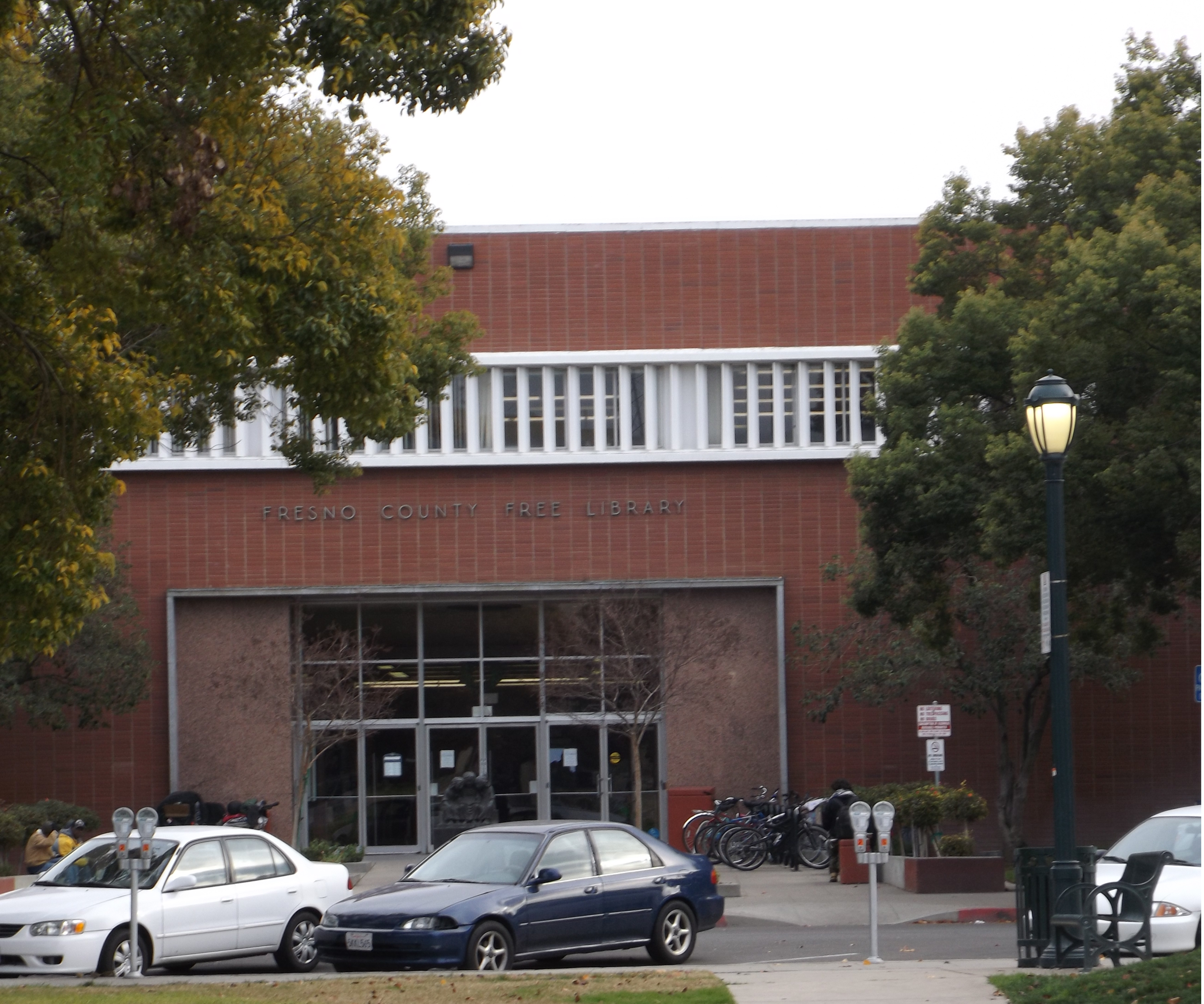
- Fresno County Public Library's headquarters, the Central Library, is located in Downtown Fresno.
- Location: Fresno, California, United States
- Established: 1910
- Branches: 35

Collection
- Items collected: Books, eBooks, music CDs, audiobooks, DVDs, magazines, and video games.
- Size: 1.1 million

Access and use
- Population served: 1 million

Other information
- Budget: US$4,390,000
- Director: Sally Gomez
- Employees: 329
- Website: fresnolibrary.org

The Fresno County Public Library provides books, ebooks, music, movies, magazines, newspapers, reference assistance, wireless Internet access and a variety of other services at its 35 locations throughout Fresno County, California. The library system is headquartered in Fresno, at the Central Library.

The library is part of the San Joaquin Valley Library System (SJVLS); a cooperative network of 10 public library jurisdictions in the counties of Fresno, Kern, Kings, Madera, Mariposa, Merced and Tulare.

== History of the Library ==
The Fresno County Public Library was founded in 1910 and housed at that time in the Fresno City Library building, which had been constructed in 1904 with a $30,000 donation from philanthropist Andrew Carnegie. Carnegie's gift was contingent on the City of Fresno taxing itself on a yearly basis to support the library. Subsequent gifts provided Carnegie libraries in Selma, Clovis and Sanger between 1906 and 1916.

The county library system originated in response to the California legislature's passing of the County Free Library Law in 1909, instituted in part to provide local organization for library systems and service populations that otherwise lacked library access. In January 1910, the Fresno County Board of Supervisors accepted the proposal for a county system, and on March 12, 1910, the County contracted with the existing Fresno City Library, headed by Miss Jean Baird, to establish such library service.

Baird was the first librarian in charge of the county system, succeeded after a short time by assistant Sarah E. McCardle (County Librarian from January 1, 1911 – December 31, 1945). By the 1920s, the Fresno County Library system had become the second largest county library in the state. McCardle is often credited with setting the pace for the library's early development, during her tenure as County Librarian. Among other innovations, she established library services in Fresno County schools and incorporated Fresno's municipal library into the County system with consent from the Fresno City Board of Trustees and County Board of Supervisors.

By the late 1950s, the first Carnegie library building had outgrown its original quarters and the time had come to replace it with a new Central Library.

The present-day Central Library in downtown Fresno opened on April 13, 1959, and today serves as the headquarters for the Fresno County Public Library.

== Collection size ==
As of June 30, 2020, Fresno County Public Library's collections contained approximately:

- 671,985 total print materials
- 261,319 Children's books
- 57,435 Young Adult books
- 59,834 ebooks
- 98,890 physical video materials
- 706 downloadable video materials
- 77,200 physical audio materials
- 24,925 downloadable audio materials

== Programs and Services ==
The Library offers Fresno County residents a wealth of information and materials, free of charge, in a variety of formats and languages. In addition to a diverse collection of books, ebooks, magazines, movies and video games, Fresno County Public Library also offers a variety of Library programs, including opportunities for children and teens, Adult Literacy services and bookmobile services to communities.

== Branches ==
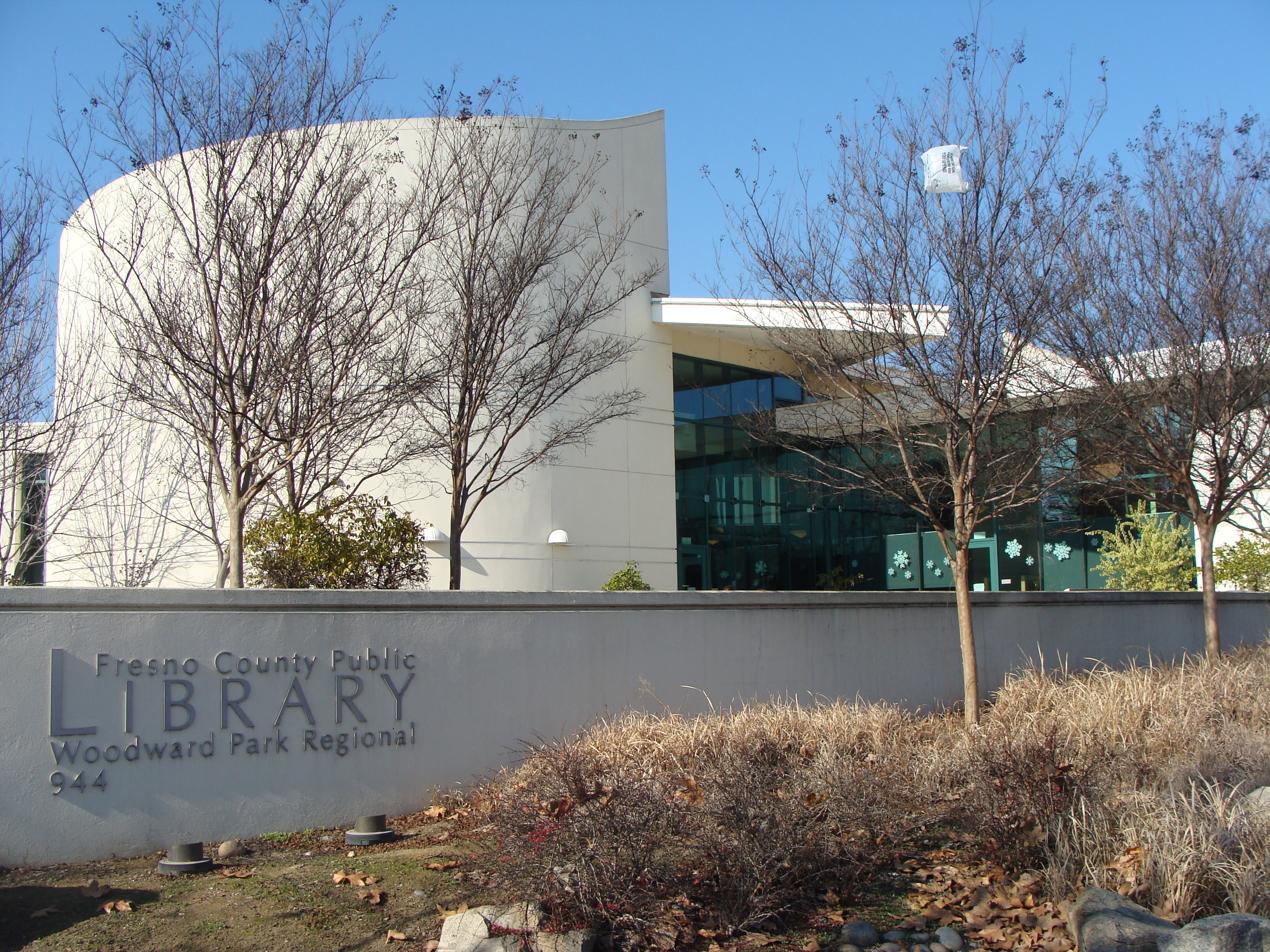
Woodward Park Regional

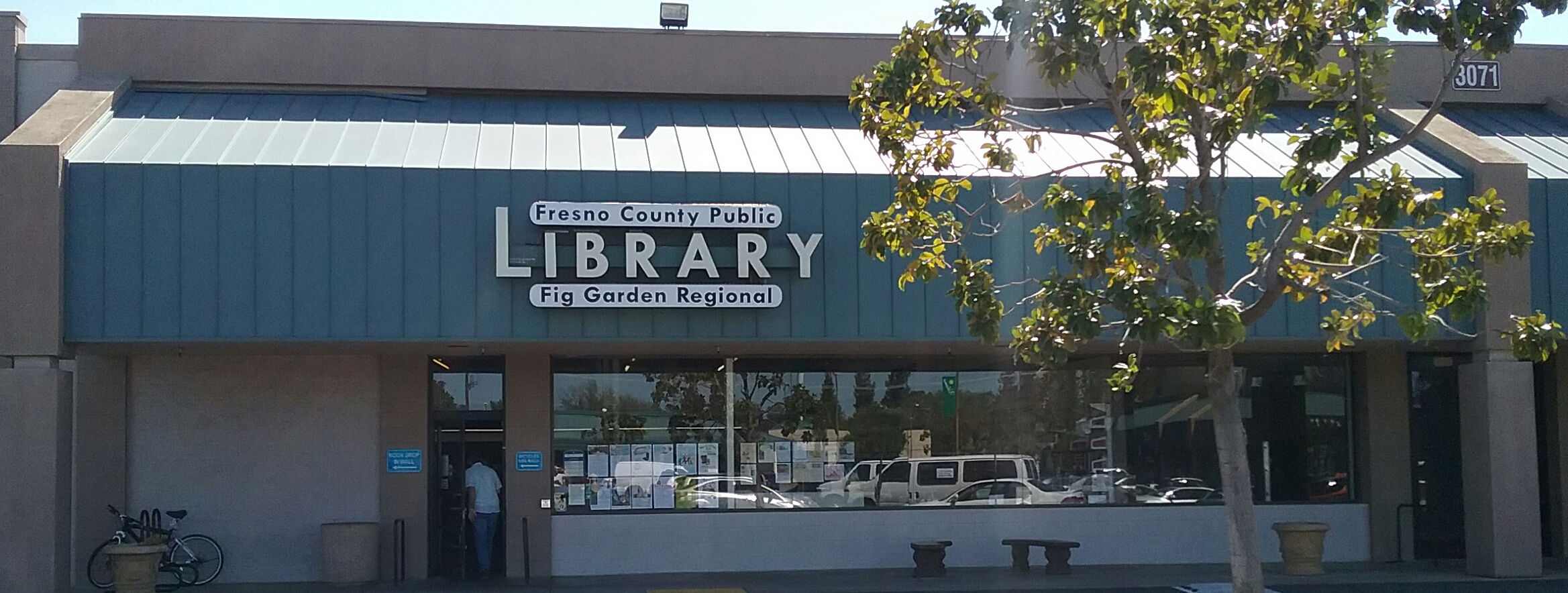
Fig Garden Regional

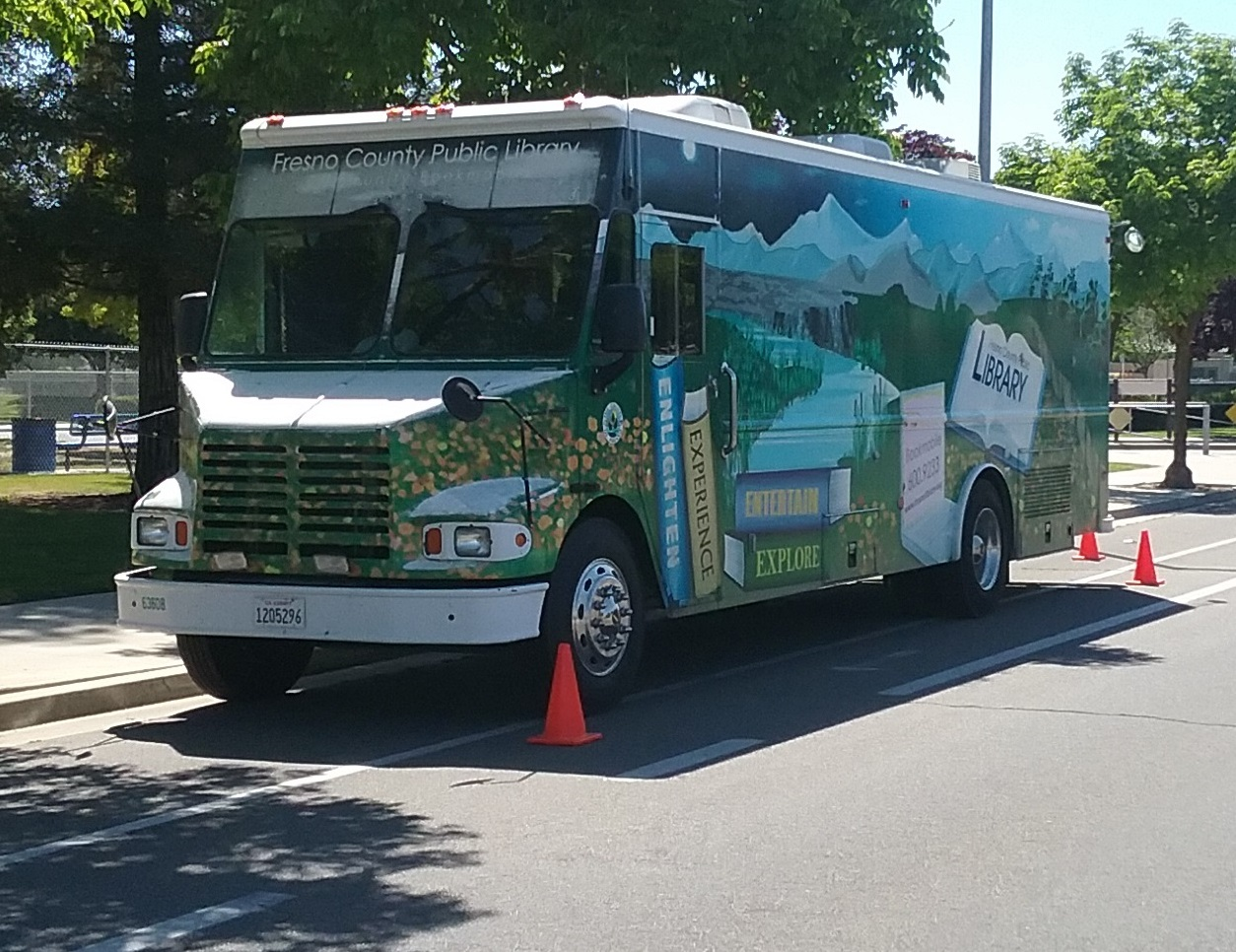
Bookmobile

A Google map of all Fresno County Public Library branch locations can be viewed here.

Central and Regional Services:

- Central Library (Fresno)
  - California History & Genealogy Room
  - Bookdrops
  - Meeting Room Reservations
  - Administration
- Literacy Services Center (Fresno)
- Talking Book Library for the Blind (Fresno)

Branches in the Fresno-Clovis Area:

- Betty Rodriguez Regional Library (Fresno)
- Clovis Regional Library (Clovis)
- Fig Garden Regional Library (Fresno)
- Gillis Branch Library (Fresno)
- Leo Politi Branch Library (Fresno)
- Mosqueda Center Branch Library (Fresno)
- Pinedale Branch Library (Pinedale, Fresno)
- Sunnyside Regional Library (Fresno)
- West Fresno Branch Library (Fresno)
- Woodward Park Regional Library (Fresno)

Branches East of California State Route 99 Area:

- Bear Mountain Branch Library (Squaw Valley, Unincorporated area)
- Fowler Branch Library (Fowler)
- Kingsburg Branch Library (Kingsburg)
- Orange Cove Branch Library (Orange Cove)
- Parlier Branch Library (Parlier)
- Piedra Branch Library (Unincorporated area)
- Reedley Branch Library (Reedley)
- Sanger Branch Library (Sanger)
- Selma Branch Library (Selma)

Mountain Branches of California State Route 168 Area:

- Auberry Branch Library (Auberry, Unincorporated area)
- Big Creek Branch Library (Big Creek, Unincorporated area)
- Shaver Lake Branch Library (Shaver Lake, Unincorporated area)

Branches West of California State Route 99 Area:

- Caruthers Branch Library (Caruthers)
- Easton Branch Library (Easton)
- Firebaugh Branch Library (Firebaugh)
- Kerman Branch Library (Kerman)
- Laton Branch Library (Laton)
- Mendota Branch Library (Mendota)
- Riverdale Branch Library (Riverdale)
- San Joaquin Branch Library (San Joaquin)
- Tranquillity Branch Library (Tranquillity)
