= Tarpey Village, California =

Tarpey Village
- census-designated place
- Location in Fresno County, California and the state of California

- Location in California
- Coordinates: 36°47′35″N 119°42′04″W
- Country: United States
- State: California
- County: Fresno

Area
  - Total: 0.789 sq mi (2.043 km^{2})
  - Land: 0.789 sq mi (2.043 km^{2})
  - Water: 0 sq mi (0 km^{2}) 0%
- Elevation: 351 ft (107 m)

Population (2020)
  - Total: 3,997
  - Density: 5,067/sq mi (1,956/km^{2})
- Time zone: UTC-8 (Pacific (PST))
  - Summer (DST): UTC-7 (PDT)
- GNIS feature ID: 236030; 2583159

Tarpey Village is a census-designated place in Fresno County, California, United States, between Fresno and Clovis, 2 miles (3.2 km) south of the latter, near Tarpey. Tarpey Village falls within the Clovis Unified School District. It lies at an elevation of 351 ft (107 m). At the 2020 census, the population was 3,997.

== Demographics ==
Historical population
Census	Pop.	Note	%±
2010	3,888		—
2020	3,997		2.8%
U.S. Decennial Census; 2010

=== 2020 census ===
As of the 2020 census, Tarpey Village had a population of 3,997. The population density was 5,065.9 inhabitants per square mile (1,956.0/km^{2}). The age distribution was 25.5% under the age of 18, 8.3% aged 18 to 24, 25.3% aged 25 to 44, 23.9% aged 45 to 64, and 17.0% who were 65 years of age or older. The median age was 36.6 years. For every 100 females, there were 97.8 males, and for every 100 females age 18 and over there were 96.1 males age 18 and over.

Racial composition as of the 2020 census
Race	Number	Percent
White	2,090	52.3%
Black or African American	47	1.2%
American Indian and Alaska Native	76	1.9%
Asian	452	11.3%
Native Hawaiian and Other Pacific Islander	13	0.3%
Some other race	744	18.6%
Two or more races	575	14.4%
Hispanic or Latino (of any race)	1,607	40.2%

The census reported that 99.7% of the population lived in households, 0.3% lived in non-institutionalized group quarters, and no one was institutionalized. In addition, 100.0% of residents lived in urban areas, while 0.0% lived in rural areas.

There were 1,301 households, out of which 35.1% included children under the age of 18, 49.7% were married-couple households, 7.8% were cohabiting couple households, 25.1% had a female householder with no partner present, and 17.4% had a male householder with no partner present. 19.8% of households were one person, and 11.3% were one person aged 65 or older. The average household size was 3.06. There were 977 families (75.1% of all households).

There were 1,333 housing units at an average density of 1,689.5 units per square mile (652.3 units/km^{2}), of which 1,301 (97.6%) were occupied. Of occupied units, 78.1% were owner-occupied and 21.9% were occupied by renters. The vacancy rate was 2.4%, with a homeowner vacancy rate of 0.4% and a rental vacancy rate of 1.4%.

=== 2010 census ===
Tarpey Village first appeared as a census designated place in the 2010 U.S. census.

== Education ==
The CDP is served by the Clovis Unified School District.

Its zoned schools are Tarpey Elementary School, Alta Sierra Intermediate School, and Buchanan High School.
