= Mayfair, Fresno County, California =

Mayfair
- census-designated place
- Location in Fresno County and the state of California

- Position in California.
- Coordinates: 36°46′09″N 119°45′41″W
- Country: United States
- State: California
- County: Fresno

Area
  - Total: 0.519 sq mi (1.343 km^{2})
  - Land: 0.519 sq mi (1.343 km^{2})
  - Water: 0 sq mi (0 km^{2}) 0%
- Elevation: 315 ft (96 m)

Population (2020)
  - Total: 4,831
  - Density: 9,317/sq mi (3,597/km^{2})
- Time zone: UTC-8 (Pacific (PST))
  - Summer (DST): UTC-7 (PDT)
- GNIS feature ID: 2583075

Mayfair is a census-designated place in Fresno County, California, United States. Mayfair sits at an elevation of 249 feet (76 m). The 2020 U.S. census reported Mayfair's population was 4,831.

== Demographics ==
Historical population
Census	Pop.	Note	%±
2010	4,589		—
2020	4,831		5.3%
U.S. Decennial Census; 2010

Mayfair first appeared as a census designated place in the 2010 U.S. census.

The 2020 United States census reported that Mayfair had a population of 4,831. The population density was 9,326.3 inhabitants per square mile (3,600.9/km^{2}). The racial makeup of Mayfair was 25.9% White, 3.9% African American, 3.0% Native American, 9.7% Asian, 0.1% Pacific Islander, 36.9% from other races, and 20.3% from two or more races. Hispanic or Latino of any race were 69.6% of the population.

The census reported that 99.8% of the population lived in households, 10 people (0.2%) lived in non-institutionalized group quarters, and no one was institutionalized.

There were 1,405 households, out of which 44.5% included children under the age of 18, 41.6% were married-couple households, 10.2% were cohabiting couple households, 29.8% had a female householder with no partner present, and 18.4% had a male householder with no partner present. 17.3% of households were one person, and 7.5% were one person aged 65 or older. The average household size was 3.43. There were 1,073 families (76.4% of all households).

The age distribution was 30.0% under the age of 18, 9.4% aged 18 to 24, 28.5% aged 25 to 44, 21.2% aged 45 to 64, and 10.9% who were 65 years of age or older. The median age was 30.9 years. For every 100 females, there were 99.0 males.

There were 1,470 housing units at an average density of 2,837.8 units per square mile (1,095.7 units/km^{2}), of which 1,405 (95.6%) were occupied. Of these, 55.6% were owner-occupied, and 44.4% were occupied by renters.

In 2023, the US Census Bureau estimated that 18.3% of the population were foreign-born. Of all people aged 5 or older, 62.2% spoke only English at home, 32.7% spoke Spanish, 0.2% spoke other Indo-European languages, and 4.9% spoke Asian or Pacific Islander languages. Of those aged 25 or older, 78.7% were high school graduates and 11.4% had a bachelor's degree.

The median household income in 2023 was $59,638, and the per capita income was $22,222. About 21.7% of families and 22.2% of the population were below the poverty line.

== Education ==
Mayfair is served by the Fresno Unified School District.

Most of the CDP is zoned to Wishon Elementary School, while people east of Cedar are zoned to Norseman Elementary School. Residents of these two school zones are zoned to Scandinavian Middle School and McLane High School.
