= Burrel Union Elementary School District =

Public school district in Fresno County, California

Address
- 16704 South Jameson Avenue Riverdale, California, 93656; United States

District information
- Type: Public
- Grades: K–8
- NCES District ID: 0606540

Students and staff
- Students: 133
- Teachers: 8.0 (FTE)
- Staff: 9.0 (FTE)
- Student–teacher ratio: 16.62:1

Other information
- Website: www.burrel.k12.ca.us

The Burrel Union Elementary School District is a public school district based in Fresno County, California.
