= Saladino's Inc =

Foodservice in Fresno, California

Saladino's Foodservice
- Company type: Private
- Industry: Retail, foodservice
- Founded: 1944; 82 years ago
- Headquarters: 3325 W Figarden Drive, Fresno, California, United States
- Key people: Craig Saladino, President & CEO; Don Saladino, Chairman
- Services: Foodservice distribution
- Owner: US Foods Holding Corp
- Website: www.saladinos.com

Saladino's, Inc. (also known as Saladino's Foodservice) is a privately owned foodservice distributor based in Fresno, California. Saladino's ranks 19th among the largest food distributors in the United States.

In 2023, it was announced that US Foods Holding Corp. had completed the purchase of Saladino's for $56 million.

== History ==
Saladino's was founded in 1944 by Don Saladino. Saladino gained experience working in his father's grocery store in Fresno, California. Saladino combined his meatpacking experience with family recipes from the Calabrese region in Italy to form the Saladino's Sausage Company. Initially, Saladino focused primarily on distributing sausage products to local grocery stores. In 1980, Don's son, Craig Saladino, joined the business, and the company expanded their products to include a wider variety of sausage and meat products while also beginning distribution to local pizzerias and restaurants.

In 2001, Saladino's moved to a larger facility located further north in Fresno. Their largest customer is the restaurant chain Subway. In that same year, they also expanded their operations to include additional warehouses located in Ontario, California, and West Sacramento, California. They operate in California, as well as parts of Arizona, Nevada, Idaho, and Oregon.

US Foods acquired Saladino's Foodservice in November 2023.
