= Simonian Farms =

Coordinates: 36°42′24.0″N 119°41′58.3″W

Simonian Farms is a farm belonging to the Simonian family and is a renowned produce market and museum in Fresno, California. The produce market sells various local fruits, grains, and honey. The farm has become a local tourist attraction due to its produce, vineyards, fields, and orchards.

== Farm ==
=== History ===
The farm was founded by Armenian immigrant Baghdasar Simonian in 1901. Simonian first arrived in Ellis Island, New York from Armenia in 1892. He settled in Fresno, California and started the Simonian Farms by producing raisins. The Simonian family was already familiar with agricultural practices from their native homeland. Since its establishment, the company continued to expand. The farm was eventually inherited by his son Michael.

After Michael Simonian, the management of the farm was passed on to its current owners, and third generation of management, Bonnie and Dennis Simonian. Under the management of Dennis and Bonnie, the Farm expanded into a market and museum.

=== Location ===
The Simonian Farm is located on its original location on Clovis & Jensen Ave. The size of the property is 80 acres (32 ha). The farm produces more than 180 crops and seasonal fruits which include cherries, peaches, nectarines, apricots, apples, pomegranates, blackberries, grapes, boysenberries, figs and persimmons. The vineyard is also used to produce signature wines. In 1995, President Bill Clinton visited the farm. The Simonian family was invited to attend Clinton's inauguration in January, 1997.

=== Museum ===
The museum called "Old Town" was opened in 2012 and has a western styled theme. The museum features various old artifacts such as automobiles, tractors, and farming equipment. The museum also features a Route 66 Shooting Range for the youth. When constructing the museum, Bonnie Simonian said that "We hope to tell the history of the Fresno area from the 1850s to the 1960s."
