= Fowler Unified School District =

School district in California, United States

Location
- 658 East Adams Ave. Fowler, California 93625 United States

Other information
- Website: www.fowlerusd.org

Fowler Unified School District is a public school district based in Fresno County, California, United States.

== School ==
- Fowler High School
- John Sutter Middle School
- Fremont Elementary
- Malaga Elementary
- Marshall Elementary
- Fowler Early Learning Education Center
- Fowler Academy (Alternative) (7-12 grade)
