= Malaga, California =

Malaga
- census-designated place
- Location in California
- Coordinates: 36°41′01″N 119°44′02″W
- Country: United States
- State: California
- County: Fresno

Area
  - Total: 0.274 sq mi (0.709 km^{2})
  - Land: 0.274 sq mi (0.709 km^{2})
  - Water: 0 sq mi (0 km^{2}) 0%
- Elevation: 300 ft (90 m)

Population (2020)
  - Total: 884
  - Density: 3,230/sq mi (1,250/km^{2})
- Time zone: UTC-8 (Pacific (PST))
  - Summer (DST): UTC-7 (PDT)
- ZIP Code: 93725
- GNIS feature IDs: 1659038; 2408163

Malaga (Spanish: Málaga) is a census-designated place in Fresno County, California, United States. It is located 6 miles (9.7 km) south-southeast of downtown Fresno, at an elevation of 295 feet (90 m). As of the 2020 census, Malaga had a population of 884.

== History ==
The post office, originally named Tokay, opened in 1886 and was renamed Malaga later that year.

The post office closed in 1964, and reopened in 1965.

The town was named for the Málaga grape.

== Demographics ==
Historical population
Census	Pop.	Note	%±
2000	762		—
2010	947		24.3%
2020	884		−6.7%
U.S. Decennial Census; 1850–1870 1880-1890; 1900 1910 1920; 1930 1940 1950; 1960 1970 1980; 1990 2000 2010 2020

Malaga first appeared in the 2000 U.S. census under the name Calwa. It was renamed Malaga for the 2010 U.S. census as the original name was incorrectly used; and a new separate CDP named Calwa was created in Fresno County.

=== 2020 census ===
Malaga CDP, California – Racial and ethnic composition Note: the US Census treats Hispanic/Latino as an ethnic category. This table excludes Latinos from the racial categories and assigns them to a separate category. Hispanics/Latinos may be of any race.
Race / Ethnicity (NH = Non-Hispanic)	Pop 2000	Pop 2010	Pop 2020	% 2000	% 2010	% 2020
White alone (NH)	20	35	23	2.62%	3.70%	2.60%
Black or African American alone (NH)	7	4	10	0.92%	0.42%	1.13%
Native American or Alaska Native alone (NH)	4	2	3	0.52%	0.21%	0.34%
Asian alone (NH)	4	11	20	0.52%	1.16%	2.26%
Pacific Islander alone (NH)	0	2	0	0.00%	0.21%	0.00%
Other Race alone (NH)	0	0	1	0.00%	0.00%	0.11%
Mixed race or Multiracial (NH)	6	2	7	0.79%	0.21%	0.79%
Hispanic or Latino (any race)	721	891	820	94.62%	94.09%	92.76%
Total	762	947	884	100.00%	100.00%	100.00%

At the 2010 census Malaga had a population of 947. The population density was 3,457.2 inhabitants per square mile (1,334.8/km^{2}). The racial makeup of Malaga was 418 (44.1%) White, 12 (1.3%) African American, 15 (1.6%) Native American, 11 (1.2%) Asian, 2 (0.2%) Pacific Islander, 464 (49.0%) from other races, and 25 (2.6%) from two or more races. Hispanic or Latino of any race were 891 people (94.1%).

The whole population lived in households, no one lived in non-institutionalized group quarters and no one was institutionalized.

There were 241 households, 135 (56.0%) had children under the age of 18 living in them, 126 (52.3%) were opposite-sex married couples living together, 56 (23.2%) had a female householder with no husband present, 24 (10.0%) had a male householder with no wife present. There were 24 (10.0%) unmarried opposite-sex partnerships, and 1 (0.4%) same-sex married couples or partnerships. 31 households (12.9%) were one person and 17 (7.1%) had someone living alone who was 65 or older. The average household size was 3.93. There were 206 families (85.5% of households); the average family size was 4.20.

The age distribution was 319 people (33.7%) under the age of 18, 116 people (12.2%) aged 18 to 24, 238 people (25.1%) aged 25 to 44, 182 people (19.2%) aged 45 to 64, and 92 people (9.7%) who were 65 or older. The median age was 27.9 years. For every 100 females, there were 97.7 males. For every 100 females age 18 and over, there were 97.5 males.

There were 268 housing units at an average density of 978.4 per square mile (377.8/km^{2}), of which 241 were occupied, 130 (53.9%) by the owners and 111 (46.1%) by renters. The homeowner vacancy rate was 1.5%; the rental vacancy rate was 2.6%. 499 people (52.7% of the population) lived in owner-occupied housing units and 448 people (47.3%) lived in rental housing units.

=== 2000 ===
As of the census of 2000, there were 762 people, 208 households, and 177 families residing in Calwa. The population density was 2,845.1 inhabitants per square mile (1,098.5/km^{2}). There were 227 housing units at an average density of 847.5 per square mile (327.2/km^{2}). The racial makeup of the community was 25.46% White, 0.92% Black or African American, 2.62% Native American, 0.52% Asian, 65.88% from other races, and 4.59% from two or more races. 94.62% of the population were Hispanic or Latino of any race.

There were 208 households, out of which 44.7% had children under the age of 18 living with them, 56.7% were married couples living together, 22.1% had a female householder with no husband present, and 14.9% were non-families. 9.1% of all households were made up of individuals, and 4.3% had someone living alone who was 65 years of age or older. The average household size was 3.66 and the average family size was 3.90.

The population was spread out, with 30.8% under the age of 18, 12.2% from 18 to 24, 26.5% from 25 to 44, 17.7% from 45 to 64, and 12.7% who were 65 years of age or older. The median age was 30 years. For every 100 females, there were 95.4 males. For every 100 females age 18 and over, there were 95.9 males.

The median income for a household in the community was $28,983, and the median income for a family was $28,285. Males had a median income of $32,167 versus $19,583 for females. The per capita income for the community was $8,292. About 27.9% of families and 28.0% of the population were below the poverty line, including 36.9% of those under age 18 and 14.6% of those age 65 or over.

== Education ==
Malaga is served by the Fowler Unified School District.
