= Oleander, California =

Unincorporated community in California, United States

Oleander
- Unincorporated community
- Location in California Oleander (the United States)
- Coordinates: 36°38′04″N 119°45′18″W
- Country: United States
- State: California
- County: Fresno
- Elevation: 285 ft (87 m)

Oleander is an unincorporated community in Fresno County, California, United States. It is located 9 miles (14 km) south-southeast of downtown Fresno, at an elevation of 285 feet (87 m).

A post office operated at Oleander from 1881 to 1935, moving in 1899. The name honors its first postmaster, William Oleander Johnson.
