= William Robert Johnston Municipal Airport =

- IATA: none; ICAO: none; FAA LID: M90

Summary
- Airport type: Public
- Owner: City of Mendota
- Serves: Mendota, California
- Elevation AMSL: 162 ft / 49 m
- Coordinates: 36°45′31″N 120°22′17″W
- Interactive map of William Robert Johnston Municipal Airport

Runways
Direction	Length		Surface
Direction	ft	m	Surface
15/33	3,499	1,066	Asphalt

Statistics (2011)
- Aircraft operations: 4,000
- Source: Federal Aviation Administration

William Robert Johnston Municipal Airport (FAA LID: M90, formerly Q84) was a city-owned public-use airport located in Mendota, a city in Fresno County, California, United States. This airport is included in the National Plan of Integrated Airport Systems for 2011–2015, which categorized it as a general aviation facility. It was known as Mendota Airport until 2008.

As of June 2025, the airport is listed as "closed indefinitely". A drag strip has been constructed on the runway.

== Facilities and aircraft ==
William Robert Johnston Municipal Airport covers an area of 130 acres (53 ha) at an elevation of 162 feet (49 m) above mean sea level. It has one runway designated 15/33 with an asphalt surface measuring 3,499 by 50 feet (1,066 x 15 m). For the 12-month period ending July 28, 2011, the airport had 4,000 general aviation aircraft operations, an average of 10 per day.
