= Millerton, Fresno County, California =

Millerton
- Unincorporated community Census-designated place
- Location within California Location within the United States
- Coordinates: 36°58′43″N 119°39′49″W
- Country: United States
- State: California
- County: Fresno

Area
  - Total: 1.96 sq mi (5.08 km^{2})
  - Land: 1.96 sq mi (5.08 km^{2})
  - Water: 0 sq mi (0 km^{2}) 0%
- Elevation: 594 ft (181 m)

Population (2020)
  - Total: 686
  - Density: 350/sq mi (135/km^{2})
- Time zone: UTC-8 (Pacific (PST))
  - Summer (DST): UTC-7 (PDT)
- ZIP Code: 93626 (Friant)
- Area code: 559
- FIPS code: 06-47592
- GNIS feature ID: 2805244

Millerton is an unincorporated community and census-designated place (CDP) in Fresno County, California, United States. It is located 3 miles (5 km) east of Friant and 23 miles (37 km) north-northeast of Fresno.

== Demographics ==
Historical population
Census	Pop.	Note	%±
2020	686		—
U.S. Decennial Census; 1850–1870 1880-1890; 1900 1910 1920; 1930 1940 1950; 1960 1970 1980; 1990 2000 2010; 2020

Millerton first appeared as a census designated place in the 2020 U.S. census.

=== 2020 Census ===
Millerton CDP, California – Racial and ethnic composition Note: the US Census treats Hispanic/Latino as an ethnic category. This table excludes Latinos from the racial categories and assigns them to a separate category. Hispanics/Latinos may be of any race.
Race / Ethnicity (NH = Non-Hispanic)	Pop 2020	% 2020
White alone (NH)	349	50.87%
Black or African American alone (NH)	29	4.23%
Native American or Alaska Native alone (NH)	10	1.46%
Asian alone (NH)	68	9.91%
Pacific Islander alone (NH)	2	0.29%
Other race alone (NH)	2	0.29%
Mixed race or Multiracial (NH)	42	6.12%
Hispanic or Latino (any race)	184	26.82%
Total	686	100.00%
