= Meux Home =

Historic mansion in Fresno, California, US

- U.S. National Register of Historic Places
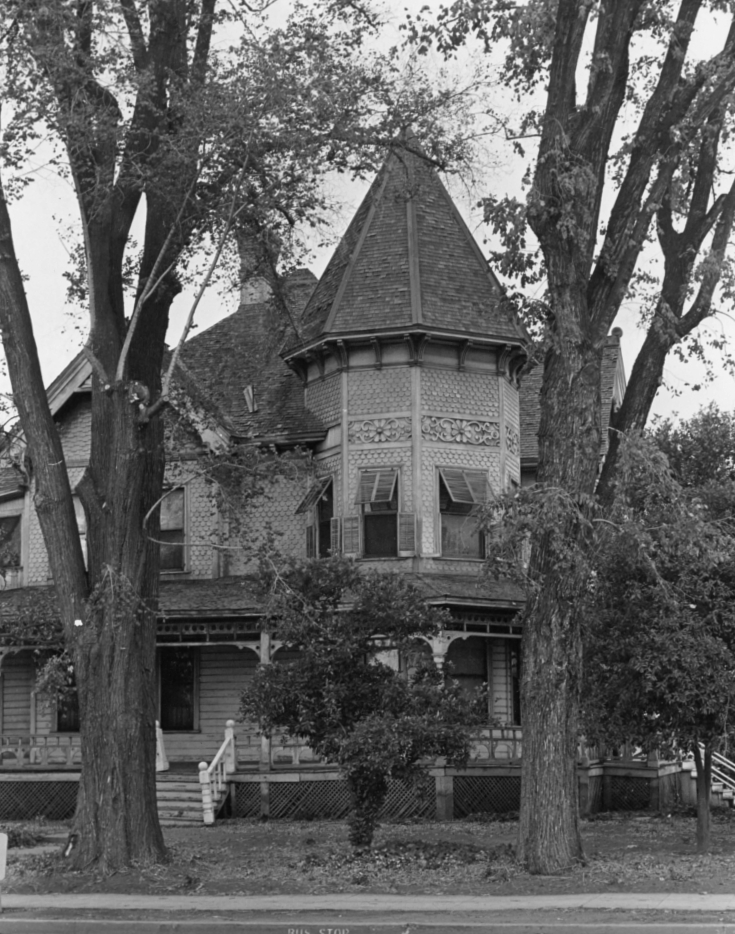
- Meux Mansion in 1975
- Location: 1007 R Street; Fresno, California
- Coordinates: 36.739746°N 119.782391°W
- Built: 1889
- Architectural style: Queen Anne
- Website: meuxhomemuseum.org
- NRHP reference No.: 75000427
- Added to NRHP: January 13, 1975

The Meux Home is a historic mansion located in Fresno, California. It was the residence of Thomas Richard Meux, a physician who served Fresno in the initial stages of the city's growth.

== History ==
=== Meux family background ===
Thomas Richard Meux was born on August 6, 1838, near Stanton, Tennessee. He received a degree from the University of Virginia then continued his education the University of Pennsylvania, studying medicine. After graduating in 1860, he moved back to Tennessee and started a medical practice. Along with his brother, John, Thomas Meux enlisted in the 9th Tennessee Infantry Regiment on May 24, 1861, just as the American Civil War was breaking out. His brother died a year later from wounds sustained in the Battle of Shiloh.

Thomas Meux applied his medical skills while on the battlefield, unofficially at first, then was officially commissioned as an assistant surgeon. He continued to serve as an assistant surgeon until he was discharged by surrender in North Carolina on in May 1865.

Remaining in Tennessee after the war, Meux married Mary Esther Davis in 1874. They started a family but decided to move the Central Valley of California. The Meux family arrived at the Southern Pacific Hotel in Fresno in December 1887 and went to work building a permanent home.

=== Home in Fresno ===
After arriving in Fresno, Meux established his medical practice and sought to build a home for his family. He chose the corner of Tulare and R streets as the homesite and enlisted a builder. At the time of construction, the area was very sparsely populated. The only other houses in the area were those of William Wyatt at R and Mariposa Streets and O. J. Woodward at Q and Mariposa Streets. O. J. Woodward later donated the land for Woodward Park.

Meux and his family moved into the newly built house in January 1889. He served as a physician for the rapidly growing Fresno area. In recognition of his medical contributions, the Fresno County Medical Society made him president. He was also a Methodist and involved with the Fresno County Democratic Club. Thomas Meux died in 1929 and was buried in the Mountain View Cemetery.

The Meux family home was not sold or altered after the death of Thomas Meux. The family continued to live in it, which allowed it to remain in mostly the same condition as when it was built, with the same architectural flourishes. One Meux daughter married local politician Henry E. Barbour in a ceremony which took place in the home's parlor in 1907. His son, John Meux, was a Fresno area rancher. The other Meux daughter, Anne, lived in the home until her death in 1970.

=== Conversion to museum and legacy ===
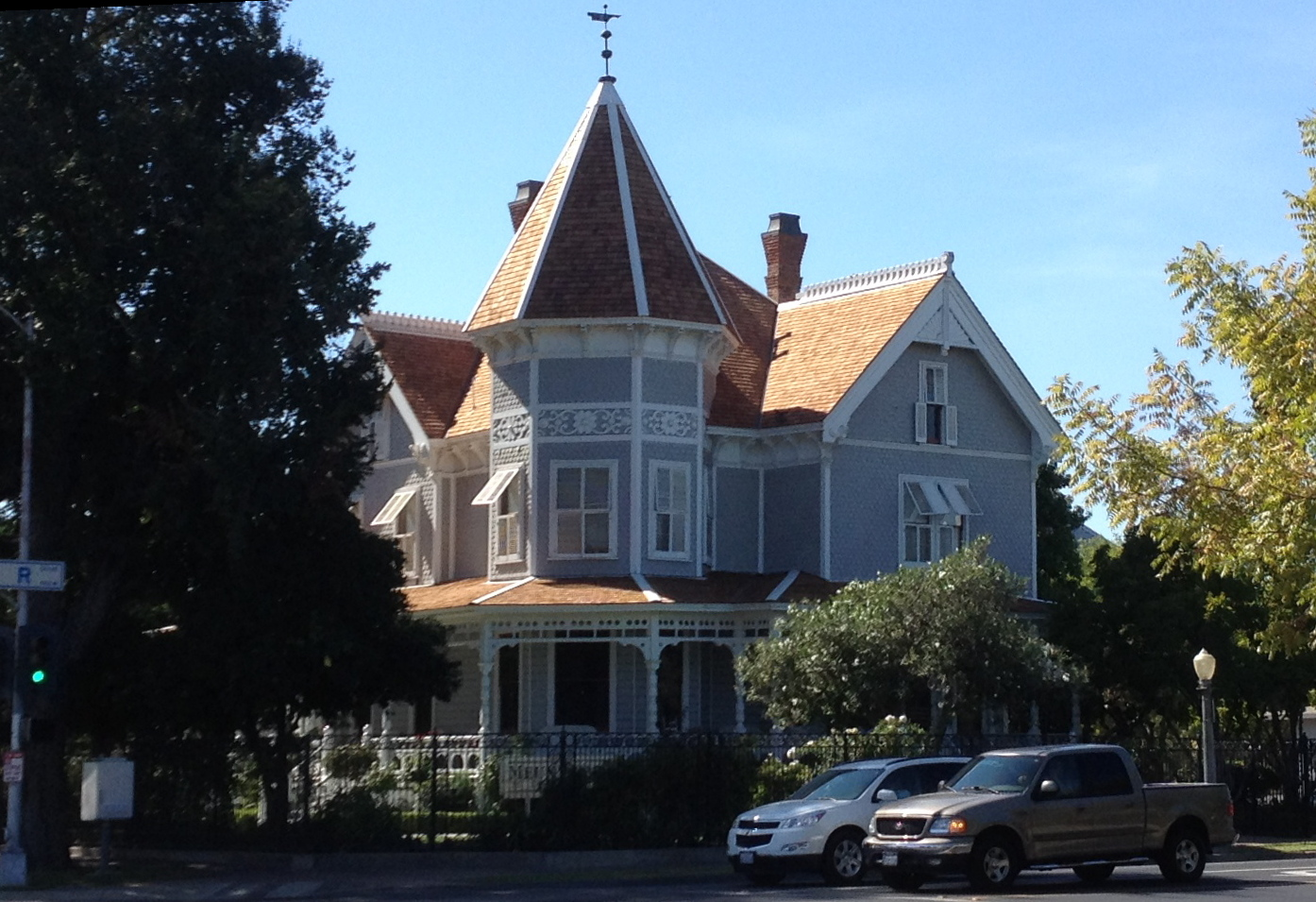
Meux Home Museum in 2013

The city of Fresno purchased the mansion from the nephew of Anne Meux in 1973 for $55,000. It began a restoration process estimated to cost an additional $50,000. Following the completed restoration, it was placed on the National Register of Historic Places in 1975 and opened to visitors as a museum the same year. The building is also listed on the city of Fresno register of historic places as well as the Fresno county list of historic places. The museum showcases local history as well as the Victorian style dating back to the 1890s.

In 2004, a small scale replica of the Meux Home was built in a new city park called "Trolley Creek" in southeast Fresno.

In 2021, there was a discussion about changing the name of the museum due to Thomas Meux's connection to the Confederate States Army. No name change was agreed upon.

It is one the oldest homes in Fresno and is significant for its elaborate style and for remaining mostly unchanged from its time of construction.

== Design ==
The Meux Home sits at the intersection of Tulare and R streets on the east end of downtown Fresno. It consists of two stories, a basement and attic rooms. It is asymmetrical in style and reflects the eclectic architectural tastes of its era.

=== Interior ===
The interior is Victorian in style. Decorations cover every wall and ceiling using a papered finish, as well as carved woodwork and stained glass windows. The stair balusters are heavy, turned-wood and the six fireplaces have intricate patterns of tile around them.

The house was constructed before electricity was available, so all lighting fixtures were constructed to be gas-fed. Even after electricity became available, several light fixtures retained their gas fittings, in case of an outage. The kitchen has been updated with an electric refrigerator and a gas-fueled range, but a wood burning range remains there, as well as a wooden icebox.

=== Exterior ===
The exterior is most recognized by the conical turret in one corner. The home is sheltered by trees and shrubs with a porch that extends around three elevations of the house. The porch has carved details at the railing and stairs.

A French Renaissance influence is seen in the chimney details, while the finials at the intersection of roof hips invoke Victorian Gothic. A few different types of siding cover the exterior as well as other contrasting textures, including staggered shingles, patterned shingles and beveled shiplap siding.
