= Helm (surname) =

Helm is a surname of Scandinavian origin.

Notable people with this name include:

== A ==
- Amy Helm (born 1970), American singer-songwriter
- Anne Helm (born 1938), Canadian actress
- Anne Helm (voice actress) (born 1986), German voice actress
- Anny Helm (1903–1993), Austrian soprano

== B ==
- Benjamin Helm (rower) (born 1964), British rower
- Benjamin Hardin Helm (1831–1863), American politician
- Bob Helm (1914–2003), American jazz clarinetist
- Boone Helm (1828–1864), American traveler and cannibal
- Brett Helm (born 1962), American entrepreneur
- Brigitte Helm (1908–1996), German actress

== C ==
- Charles Helm (1844–1915), South African missionary
- Charles J. Helm (1817–1868), American politician and diplomat
- Christopher Helm (1937–2007), Scottish publisher
- Clementine Helm (1825–1896), German author

== D ==
- Damariscotta Helm, American whistler
- Daniel Helm (born 1995), American football player
- Darren Helm (born 1987), Canadian ice hockey player
- Dieter Helm (born 1956), British economist
- Dieter Helm (politician) (1941–2022), German farmer and politician
- Dörte Helm (1898–1941), German artist
- Drew Helm (born 1984), American soccer player

== E ==
- Everett Helm (1913–1999), American composer

== F ==
- Fay Helm (1909–2003), American actress
- Frances Helm (1923-2006), American actress
- Franz Helm (1500–1567), German artillery master

== G ==
- Georg Helm (1851–1923), German mathematician
- George Helm (1950–1977), Hawaiian activist and musician
- George Helm (cricketer) (1838–1898), English cricketer
- Gunnar Helm (born 2002), American football player

== H ==
- Harvey Helm (1865–1919), American politician
- Israel Helm (1630–1702), Swedish colonist

== J ==
- James Helm (born 1977-) UK/Australian actor, writer and comedian.
- Jack Helm (1839–1873), American cowboy
- James Meredith Helm (1855–1927), American naval officer
- John Helm (disambiguation)
- Joseph Helm (1848–1915), American jurist
- Joshua Helm (born 1982), American basketball player
- June Helm (1924–2004), American anthropologist

== K ==
- Karl Helm (1871–1960), German medievalist
- Ken Helm, American politician
- Knox Helm (1893–1964), British diplomat

== L ==
- Leonard Helm (1720–1782), American soldier
- Levon Helm (1940–2012), American rock drummer
- Lorin Helm (1920–1945), American football coach
- Lucinda Barbour Helm (1839–1897), American author

== M ==
- MacKinley Helm (1896–1963), American writer and collector
- Mark Helm (disambiguation)
- Mathew Helm (born 1980), Australian diver
- Michael Helm (born 1961), Canadian novelist

== N ==
- Nellie Lathrop Helm (1859–1940), American author
- Nick Helm (born 1980), British comedian

== P ==
- Paul Helm (born 1940), British theologian
- Peyton R. Helm (born 1949), American academic administrator

== R ==
- Raiatea Helm (born 1984), American vocalist
- Robert Helm (born 1949), American politician
- Rüdiger Helm (born 1956), German sprint canoeist
- Rudolf Helm (1872–1966), German philologist
- Ryan Helm (born 1982), American musician

== S ==
- Sarah Helm (born 1956), British journalist
- Sue Helm (born 1943), American politician

== T ==
- Theodor Helm (1843–1920), Austrian musicologist
- Tiffany Helm (born 1964), American actress
- Toby Helm, British journalist
- Tom Helm (disambiguation)

== W ==
- William Helm (1837–1919), American pioneer and farmer
- William Henry Helm (1860–1936), English author
- W. Stuart Helm (1908–1986), American politician

== Z ==
- Zach Helm (born 1975), American writer and film director

== See also ==
- Senator Helm (disambiguation)
- Helms, people with the surname
