= Helm =

Helm may refer to:

== Common meanings ==
- a ship's steering mechanism; see tiller and ship's wheel
- another term for helmsman
- an archaic term for a helmet, used as armor

== Arts and entertainment ==
- Matt Helm, a character created by Donald Hamilton
- Helm (Forgotten Realms), a god in the Forgotten Realms campaign setting for the game Dungeons & Dragons
- Helm, a character from the 2000AD comic strip Rogue Trooper
- Helm (album), released by Lebanese singer Carole Samaha
- Helm, a 1998 novel by Steven Gould
- Helm, a 2025 novel by Sarah Hall

== HELM ==
- Hierarchical editing language for macromolecules, a method of describing complex biological molecules
- Holomorphic embedding load flow method, a mathematical technique for solving AC power flow
- HELM Motorsports, a Japanese auto racing team

== People ==
- Helm (given name)
- Helm (surname)

== Places ==
=== United States ===
- Helm, California, an unincorporated community
- Helm, Kentucky, an unincorporated community
- Helm, Missouri, an unincorporated community
- Helm Canal, California, an aqueduct

=== Antarctica ===
- Helm Glacier
- Helm Peak
- Helm Point

=== Elsewhere ===
- Helm Crag, Cumbria, England
- Helm (mountain), South Tyrol, Italy
- Helm (restaurant), Makati, Philippines

== Other uses ==
- Helm AG, German chemical company
- Helm Bank, a Colombian commercial bank purchased and rebranded by Itaú Unibanco
- Helmet (heraldry) or helm
- Helm (software), a package manager for Kubernetes
- Helm Wind, which blows in Cumbria, England
- Quarter florin, a medieval English coin known as a helm
- USS Helm, a United States Navy destroyer
- Helm, an open source music synthesizer by Matt Tytel

== See also ==
- Helms (disambiguation)
- Helme (disambiguation)
