= Lechler =

Italian paint manufacturer

Lechler S.p.A.
- Industry: Chemicals
- Founded: 1858
- Founder: Christian Lechler
- Headquarters: Como, Italy
- Area served: Worldwide
- Products: Paints and Coatings
- Number of employees: more than 400 (2011)
- Subsidiaries: Lechler Coatings Ltd. Lechler Coatings GmbH; Lechler Coatings France S.A.R.L. Lechler Coatings Iberica SL
- Website: www.lechler.eu

Lechler is an Italian paints and coatings manufacturer.

== 1858: the German origin ==
Lechler originated from the German company Christian Lechler und Sohn Nachfolger established in 1858 in Stuttgart by the chemist-pharmacist Christian Lechler. Christian's son, Paul Lechler, expanded the business and in 1878 sold it to his main collaborators to focus on other undertakings in the chemical field and spraying technology. The company's longevity bears two hallmarks: continuity in the ownership succession model and management teams made up of people grown within the organisation with discontinuous presence at the helm of members of the owners’ families, who were present in early years, then absent for decades to make a comeback as the company became a well-established name in the industry.

== 1889: opening of the Italian subsidiary ==
In 1889, the German company opened a subsidiary in Ponte Chiasso, Como. The Italian subsidiary was run by a German engineer, Ermanno Spindler. In the early years customers were small-sized non-specialist retailers, professional private users and businesses that employed Lechler products largely on iron and wood, e.g. coaches, railway wagons and carriages, tramway cars and furnishings.

== 1910: the Italian subsidiary becomes independent of the German parent ==
In 1910, as the German parent had decided to shut down the Italian subsidiary, three employees, Messrs. Brizzolara, La Regina and Rizzi asked a local bank Banco Edoardo Clerici, later renamed Banca Amadeo, to bring together a pool of financiers willing to invest in the business in which they too would buy a stake and also manage. The bank was quick to find enough investors interested in the venture and in February 1910 the partnership Chr. Lechler & Figlio Successori was formed in Como and it took over ownership and management of the Italian business. Under the new management the industrialisation of the production process got started: electricity and the first machines began to be used, a specialised graduate was hired at the lab. The company's logo too was redesigned. As was the wont with other paints and coatings makers, the symbol of an animal – an eagle with spread out wings – was added to the Lechler company's name.

== The 1920s: synthetic coatings ==
In the second half of the 1920s production gradually shifted from being almost entirely based on natural raw materials (linseed oil, natural resins and pigments obtained from metals) to increasingly using synthetic raw materials. Largely employed to make explosives during World War I, nitrocellulose became commonplace in formulations of coatings for cars and other vehicles. Lechler was the first in Italy to develop, make and sell a product based on such a raw material, i.e. Lechleroid which dried fast, could be sprayed and came in a broad range of colours. In those same years, as the first alkyd resins became available the company developed a product line made up of coloured synthetic resin-based enamels Syntex.

== The 1930s and 1940s: Onnik Manoukian ==
Between 1929 and 1944, the first generation of Italian Lechler partners gradually passed the baton to a new leadership team: Onnik Manoukian, a Zurich Polytechnic chemistry graduate who had joined Lechler in 1925 as Technical Director, and Aldo Bruschi, a manager hired in the same year. Onnik Manoukian was the man who drove Lechler's technology renewal for many years to come.

== The years after WWII: development of the sales network ==
In the years after the Second World War company's growth was built on the small facilities in Ponte Chiasso, a lean internal organisation and a small network of sales agents covering the entire market. Sales were promoted and boosted by product quality itself, brand image investment was minimal. Relations with distributors and users were on a personal basis.

== The 1950s and 1960s: new resins, new markets ==
Like in the 1920s the development of new raw materials by large chemical companies allowed paints and coatings makers to develop a whole new generation of products. Thanks to novel polyurethane resins Lechler was fast to launch some products: Isofan, a name in vehicle painting, Dermophan, in leather painting, Acriplast and its derivatives for painting plastic items used in the automotive and interior design fields.

== The 1970s: the start of a systemic model in product formulation and the organisation ==
The 1970s marked the beginning of modernisation for Lechler: the management team got renewed with the entry of the sons of the two owners (engineer Noubar Manoukian and Renato Bruschi), and the organisation and technical structures were reinforced by the hiring of numerous technical staff and some graduates. The new facilities reflected the convergence of Noubar Manoukian's industrial engineering and the Italian rationalism of architect Manouk Manoukian. The company's modernisation was accompanied and supported by the progressive introduction of information technology across the company's functions: R&D, production, finance. The rationalisation and integration of the formulation and colour inventory into a systemic platform fit for a variety of tinting equipment responded to the increasing demand for diversified product and colour ranges (Isofan, BSB, Extralucido, Isoakryl and RS systems).

== The 1990s: the facilities in Foligno, water-based paints, European offices ==
In the 1990s a new production site was opened in Foligno, central Italy, initially for the production of home decoration and construction products and later expanded to include modern units for water-based products. In these years the company began to expand abroad: first into Europe with the opening of offices in the UK, France, Spain and Germany, then into the rest of the world with the establishment of a distributors’ network. Product R&D was boosted and the company launched new environmentally friendly automotive refinish product lines (Hydrofan and Macrofan) and sophisticated multipurpose systems for industrial and decorative applications (Lechsys and DAC).

== Recent years ==
In the 2000s (decade) the Company changed into a joint-stock company run by a strong management team that reorganised the business around four core areas: Refinish, Industry (Lechler Tech), Decorative (Chrèon), Yachting (with the acquisition of the Stoppani brand) and Habitat (with the acquisition of the IVE brand).

Since the 1990s Lechler has been working with ASI, the Historic Car and Motorcycle Club of Italy, on the research, preservation and standardisation of colour and painting cycle schemes for the restoration of vintage cars and motorcycles. These joint efforts have led to the creation of the Lechler-ASI Official Registry of Historic Motorcycle Colours, that stores information about the colours used by motorcycle manufacturers organised by make, model and year of manufacturing. Lechler also works with artists Fabrizio Musa, Mariko Mori, Marco Della Torre and Raymundo Sesma to find paint solutions that meet their needs.

== Bibliography ==
- Gianfranco Brenni (a cura di), Fabbriche di vernici e memorie storiche, Sviluppo chimica S.p.A., Milano 1995.
- Paul Gehring, Paul Lechler. Großkaufmann und Fabrikant, Sozialreformer, Gründer des deutschen Instituts für ärztliche Mission, 1849–1925 in Max Miller, Robert Uhland (Hg.), Schwäbische Lebensbilder, Bd. 6, Stuttgart, 1957, 401–428.
- Elke Elizabeth Hamacher, Paul Lechler und die Wohnungsfrage um 1900, Zeitschrift fur Unternehmensgeschichte, Beiheft 31, Wiesbaden, Franz Steiner Verlag, 1984. ISBN 3-515-04070-6
- Akzo Lesonal 125 Jahre Lack-Ideen. 1858–1983. Fortschritt hat Tradition, Feuerbach, 1983.
- Agop Manoukian, Lechler. Storia e racconti di un marchio – Vol. 1: Vernici e Smalti dal 1858, Venezia, Oemme edizioni, 2008. ISBN 978-88-85822-33-7.
- Agop Manoukian, Lechler. Storia e racconti di un marchio – Vol. 2: Cent'anni di Lechler italiana, Venezia, Oemme edizioni, 2010. ISBN 978-88-85822-36-8.
- Agop Manoukian, Fabio Camozzi, Luciano Valli (a cura di), Lechler. Storia e racconti di un marchio – Vol. 3: Attraverso le immagini, Venezia, Oemme edizioni, 2010. ISBN 978-88-85822-37-5.
