= Helms =

Helms is an English and Danish Patronymic Surname and means son of Helm, which derives from the Old Norse name Hjelm or Hjälm meaning 'helmet'. The name may also be a short form of the English Toponymic Surname Helmsley after the town in North Yorkshire. It may refer to:

- Adam Helms (born 1974), American artist
- Bobby Helms (1933–1997), American country music singer Robert Lee Helms
- Chet Helms (1942–2005), American rock promoter, founder and manager of the rock band Big Brother and the Holding Company
- David H. Helms (1838–1921), American Union Army soldier during the American Civil War and recipient of the Medal of Honor
- Don Helms (1927–2008), American country music steel guitarist
- Ed Helms (born 1974), American actor
- Gregory Helms (born 1974), American professional wrestler
- Hans G. Helms (1932–2012), German experimental writer, composer and social and economic analyst and critic
- Hermann Helms (1870–1963), American chess player, writer and promoter
- Jesse Helms (1921–2008), American senator from North Carolina from 1973 to 2003
- Johannes Helms (1828–1895), Danish writer and headmaster
- John Henry Helms (1874–1919), American Marine and a recipient of the Medal of Honor
- Johnny Helms (1935–2015), American jazz trumpeter
- J. Lynn Helms (1925–2011), President of Piper Aircraft Corp. and Administrator of the Federal Aviation Administration
- Juanita Helms (1941–2009), American politician
- Laili Helms, Taliban advocate in the West before the 9/11 attacks
- Mike Helms (born 1982), American former basketball player
- Paul Helms (1889–1957), American banking executive, founder of the Helms Bakery and co-founder of the Helms Athletic Foundation
- Randel Helms (born 1942), American professor of English literature
- Richard Helms (1913–2002), American government official, Director of Central Intelligence (DCI) Director from 1966 to 1973
- Richard Helms (naturalist) (1842–1914), German-born Australian naturalist
- Susan Helms (born 1958), American Air Force lieutenant general and astronaut
- Tommy Helms (1941–2025), American Major League Baseball player and manager
- Wes Helms (born 1976), American Major League Baseball player, nephew of Tommy Helms
- William Helms (died 1813), American politician, representative from New Jersey and Revolutionary War officer
