= 2013 Daytona 500 =

Auto race held at Daytona, United States in 2013

Race details
- Race 1 of 36 in the 2013 NASCAR Sprint Cup Series
- Date: February 24, 2013
- Location: Daytona International Speedway; Daytona Beach, Florida, U.S.
- Course: Permanent racing facility 2.5 mi (4.023 km)
- Distance: 200 laps, 500 mi (804.672 km)
- Weather: Warm with temperatures reaching up to 79 °F (26 °C); wind speeds approaching 8 miles per hour (13 km/h)
- Average speed: 159.250 mph (256.288 km/h)

Pole position
Driver	Danica Patrick	Stewart–Haas Racing
- Time: 45.817 seconds

Qualifying race winners
Duel 1 Winner	Kevin Harvick	Richard Childress Racing
Duel 2 Winner	Kyle Busch	Joe Gibbs Racing

Most laps led
Driver	Matt Kenseth	Joe Gibbs Racing
- Laps: 86

Winner
No. 48	Jimmie Johnson	Hendrick Motorsports

Television in the United States
- Network: Fox
- Announcers: Mike Joy, Darrell Waltrip, and Larry McReynolds
- Nielsen ratings: 9.9/22 (16.7 million viewers)

The 2013 Daytona 500, the 55th running of the event, was held on February 24, 2013, at Daytona International Speedway in Daytona Beach, Florida over 200 laps and 500 miles (800 km) on the 2.5-mile (4 km) asphalt tri-oval. It was the first race of the 2013 Sprint Cup season. Danica Patrick won the pole for the race, becoming the first woman to earn a pole position in NASCAR's highest division. She also achieved the best-ever finish by a woman at the Daytona 500, finishing 8th. Jimmie Johnson, driving for Hendrick Motorsports, won the race, making this his first win of the season and his second win in the "Great American Race" and his first since the 2006 race. His teammate Dale Earnhardt Jr. finished 2nd while Mark Martin, Brad Keselowski, and Ryan Newman rounded out the Top 5.

The race was the final Daytona 500 start for Mark Martin, Dave Blaney, Juan Pablo Montoya, Travis Kvapil, David Reutimann, Scott Speed, and Jeff Burton.

The race marked the first time since 2000 that Dodge did not partake in the Sprint Cup Series. It also marked the debut of the Gen-6 car.

== Report ==
=== Background ===
Daytona International Speedway, where the race was held. The front stretch is at the bottom of the figure.

Daytona International Speedway is one of six superspeedways to hold NASCAR races, the others being Michigan International Speedway, Auto Club Speedway, Indianapolis Motor Speedway, Pocono Raceway and Talladega Superspeedway. The standard track at Daytona International Speedway is a four-turn superspeedway that is 2.5 miles (4.0 km) long. The track's turns are banked at 31 degrees, while the front stretch, the location of the finish line, is banked at 18 degrees. Matt Kenseth was the defending race winner. In addition to NASCAR, the track also hosts races of ARCA, AMA Superbike, USCC, SCCA, and Motocross. The track features multiple layouts including the primary 2.5 miles (4.0 km) high speed tri-oval, a 3.56 miles (5.73 km) sports car course, a 2.95 miles (4.75 km) motorcycle course, and a .25 miles (0.40 km) karting and motorcycle flat-track. The track's 180-acre (73 ha) infield includes the 29-acre (12 ha) Lake Lloyd, which has hosted powerboat racing. The speedway is owned and operated by International Speedway Corporation.

The track was built to host racing that was being held at the former Daytona Beach Road Course and opened with the first Daytona 500 in 1959. The speedway has been renovated three times, with the infield renovated in 2004, and the track repaved in 1978 and 2010.

In preparation for the race, NASCAR held several test sessions on January 10–12, 2013, for teams to test the sixth generation of race cars. Every test session began at 9 a.m. EST, paused between 12 p.m. and 1 p.m. EST, and concluded at 5 p.m. EST. During the first session on the morning of January 10, 2013, thirty-four drivers participated; Kenseth, driving for Joe Gibbs Racing, was quickest with a speed of 192.757 mph while Denny Hamlin had the highest speed of 195.712 mph during the second session in the afternoon.

The third test session, held during the morning of January 11, was led by Jeff Burton after having the highest speed of 194.805 mph. The fourth session was the first session in which multiple drivers were on track to draft, which resulted in a large accident following contact between Dale Earnhardt Jr. and Marcos Ambrose. Following the crash, ten teams left the track because of a shortage of parts for the new car. During that fourth session, held during the afternoon, thirty-two drivers participated with 2011 race winner Trevor Bayne being quickest with a speed of 199.650 mph. During the fifth session, held on the morning of January 12, twenty-one drivers participated; Kenseth was quickest with a speed of 194.062 mph. Greg Biffle was quickest with a speed of 194.936 mph in the final session.

== Entry list ==
- (R) denotes rookie driver
- (i) denotes ineligible for drivers points
- (W) denotes past 500 winner

No.	Driver	Team	Manufacturer
1	Jamie McMurray (W)	Earnhardt Ganassi Racing	Chevrolet
2	Brad Keselowski	Penske Racing	Ford
5	Kasey Kahne	Hendrick Motorsports	Chevrolet
7	Dave Blaney	Tommy Baldwin Racing	Chevrolet
9	Marcos Ambrose	Richard Petty Motorsports	Ford
10	Danica Patrick (R)	Stewart–Haas Racing	Chevrolet
11	Denny Hamlin	Joe Gibbs Racing	Toyota
13	Casey Mears	Germain Racing	Ford
14	Tony Stewart	Stewart–Haas Racing	Chevrolet
15	Clint Bowyer	Michael Waltrip Racing	Toyota
16	Greg Biffle	Roush Fenway Racing	Ford
17	Ricky Stenhouse Jr. (R)	Roush Fenway Racing	Ford
18	Kyle Busch	Joe Gibbs Racing	Toyota
19	Mike Bliss (i)	Humphrey Smith Racing	Toyota
20	Matt Kenseth (W)	Joe Gibbs Racing	Toyota
21	Trevor Bayne (W) (i)	Wood Brothers Racing	Ford
22	Joey Logano	Penske Racing	Ford
24	Jeff Gordon (W)	Hendrick Motorsports	Chevrolet
26	Michael Waltrip (W)	Swan Racing	Toyota
27	Paul Menard	Richard Childress Racing	Chevrolet
29	Kevin Harvick (W)	Richard Childress Racing	Chevrolet
31	Jeff Burton	Richard Childress Racing	Chevrolet
32	Terry Labonte	FAS Lane Racing	Ford
33	Austin Dillon (i)	Richard Childress Racing	Chevrolet
34	David Ragan	Front Row Motorsports	Ford
35	Josh Wise (i)	Front Row Motorsports	Ford
36	J. J. Yeley	Tommy Baldwin Racing	Chevrolet
38	David Gilliland	Front Row Motorsports	Ford
39	Ryan Newman (W)	Stewart–Haas Racing	Chevrolet
42	Juan Pablo Montoya	Earnhardt Ganassi Racing	Chevrolet
43	Aric Almirola	Richard Petty Motorsports	Ford
47	Bobby Labonte	JTG Daugherty Racing	Toyota
48	Jimmie Johnson (W)	Hendrick Motorsports	Chevrolet
51	Regan Smith (i)	Phoenix Racing	Chevrolet
52	Brian Keselowski (i)	Brian Keselowski Motorsports Hamilton Means Racing	Toyota
55	Mark Martin	Michael Waltrip Racing	Toyota
56	Martin Truex Jr.	Michael Waltrip Racing	Toyota
78	Kurt Busch	Furniture Row Racing	Chevrolet
83	David Reutimann	BK Racing	Toyota
87	Joe Nemechek	NEMCO-Jay Robinson Racing	Toyota
88	Dale Earnhardt Jr. (W)	Hendrick Motorsports	Chevrolet
93	Travis Kvapil	BK Racing	Toyota
95	Scott Speed	Leavine Family Racing	Ford
98	Michael McDowell	Phil Parsons Racing	Ford
99	Carl Edwards	Roush Fenway Racing	Ford

== Practice and qualifying ==
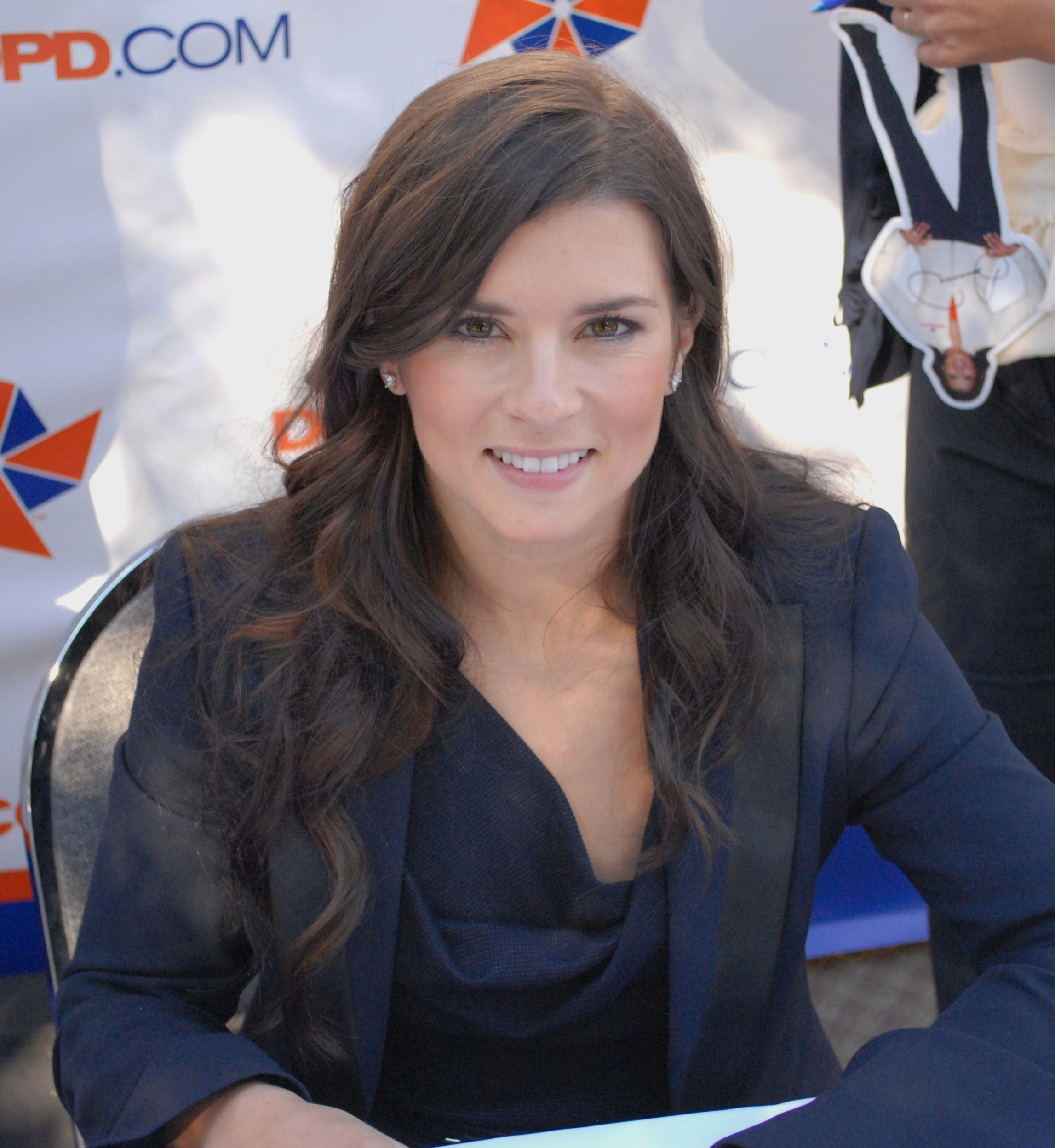
Danica Patrick became the first woman to win a pole position in a NASCAR Sprint Cup Series race.

Seven practice sessions were held before the race. The first two on February 16 ran 120 minutes and 105 minutes each. The next two on February 20 were 90 minutes each. Two days later, two more 60 minute practice sessions were scheduled. The final practice session was held on February 23. Joey Logano was quickest with a time of 46.057 seconds in the first session, less than one-hundredth of a second faster than Austin Dillon. Danica Patrick was just off Dillon's pace, followed by Paul Menard, Burton and Kasey Kahne. Bayne was seventh, still within two-tenths of Logano's time. In the second practice session, Patrick remained fastest with a time of 45.867 seconds, less than one second quicker than second-placed Tony Stewart. Kyle Busch took third place, ahead of Earnhardt Jr., Jamie McMurray and Bayne.

Forty-five cars were entered for qualifying, but only forty-three raced because of NASCAR's qualifying procedure. Unlike most races during the season, the qualifying session only determined the first two positions, while the rest of the drivers qualified by the 2013 Budweiser Duels. Patrick clinched her first pole during her Sprint Cup career, with a time of 45.817 seconds, and became the first woman to win the pole position in the Sprint Cup Series. She was joined on the front row of the grid by Jeff Gordon.

Once the qualifying session were completed, Patrick commented, "I was brought up to be the fastest driver, not the fastest girl. That was instilled in me from very young, from the beginning. Then I feel like thriving in those moments, where the pressure's on, has also been a help for me. I also feel like I've been lucky in my career to be with good teams and have good people around me. I don't think any of it would have been possible without that. For those reasons, I've been lucky enough to make history, be the first woman to do many things. I really just hope that I don't stop doing that. We have a lot more history to make. We are excited to do it."

Michael Waltrip was quickest in the third practice with 45.375 seconds, followed by David Ragan, Stewart, Menard and Kyle Busch. Kahne led fourth practice with 45.515 seconds, only one-tenth of a second faster than Greg Biffle. Gordon was third ahead of Patrick and Carl Edwards. Kevin Harvick and Kyle Busch were the winners of the Budweiser Duels. The qualifying grid was finalized with Harvick in third and Kyle Busch fourth. Biffle qualified fifth ahead of Kahne, Juan Pablo Montoya, Dillon, Jimmie Johnson and Clint Bowyer. Drivers who failed to qualify were Mike Bliss and Brian Keselowski.

Aric Almirola was fastest in fifth practice with a 45.699 seconds lap, ahead of Burton, Earnhardt Jr., Bobby Labonte and Michael McDowell. Stewart led the sixth session ahead of Gordon and Patrick. Kahne was next with a 45.711 second lap ahead of Kenseth with 45.827 seconds. Earnhardt's 45.319 seconds topped the final practice session, followed by David Gilliland and Bowyer. Ambrose and Almirola rounded out the first five drivers in the fourth and fifth positions.

=== Qualifying results ===
Pos	No.	Driver	Team	Manufacturer	Time	Speed
1	10	Danica Patrick	Stewart–Haas Racing	Chevrolet	45.817	196.434
2	24	Jeff Gordon	Hendrick Motorsports	Chevrolet	45.850	196.292
3	21	Trevor Bayne	Wood Brothers Racing	Ford	45.924	195.976
4	39	Ryan Newman	Stewart–Haas Racing	Chevrolet	45.931	195.946
5	14	Tony Stewart	Stewart–Haas Racing	Chevrolet	45.936	195.925
6	5	Kasey Kahne	Hendrick Motorsports	Chevrolet	45.953	195.852
7	11	Denny Hamlin	Joe Gibbs Racing	Toyota	45.972	195.771
8	18	Kyle Busch	Joe Gibbs Racing	Toyota	45.973	195.767
9	22	Joey Logano	Penske Racing	Ford	45.973	195.767
10	20	Matt Kenseth	Joe Gibbs Racing	Toyota	45.983	195.725
11	88	Dale Earnhardt Jr.	Hendrick Motorsports	Chevrolet	46.016	195.584
12	17	Ricky Stenhouse Jr.	Roush Fenway Racing	Ford	46.027	195.537
13	42	Juan Pablo Montoya	Earnhardt Ganassi Racing	Chevrolet	46.034	195.508
14	27	Paul Menard	Richard Childress Racing	Chevrolet	46.035	195.503
15	13	Casey Mears	Germain Racing	Ford	46.037	195.495
16	33	Austin Dillon	Richard Childress Racing	Chevrolet	46.063	195.385
17	99	Carl Edwards	Roush Fenway Racing	Ford	46.097	195.240
18	15	Clint Bowyer	Michael Waltrip Racing	Toyota	46.100	195.228
19	56	Martin Truex Jr.	Michael Waltrip Racing	Toyota	46.105	195.207
20	31	Jeff Burton	Richard Childress Racing	Chevrolet	46.117	195.156
21	48	Jimmie Johnson	Hendrick Motorsports	Chevrolet	46.134	195.084
22	1	Jamie McMurray	Earnhardt Ganassi Racing	Chevrolet	46.144	195.042
23	2	Brad Keselowski	Penske Racing	Ford	46.163	194.461
24	9	Marcos Ambrose	Richard Petty Motorsports	Ford	46.203	194.793
25	29	Kevin Harvick	Richard Childress Racing	Chevrolet	46.215	194.742
26	43	Aric Almirola	Richard Petty Motorsports	Ford	46.215	194.742
27	16	Greg Biffle	Roush Fenway Racing	Ford	46.218	194.729
28	55	Mark Martin	Michael Waltrip Racing	Toyota	46.229	194.683
29	38	David Gilliland	Front Row Motorsports	Ford	46.236	194.654
30	34	David Ragan	Front Row Motorsports	Ford	46.245	194.616
31	26	Michael Waltrip	Swan Racing	Toyota	46.317	194.313
32	35	Josh Wise	Front Row Motorsports	Ford	46.331	194.254
33	78	Kurt Busch	Furniture Row Racing	Chevrolet	46.474	193.657
34	98	Michael McDowell	Phil Parsons Racing	Ford	46.501	193.544
35	95	Scott Speed	Leavine Family Racing	Ford	46.502	193.540
36	32	Terry Labonte	FAS Lane Racing	Ford	46.508	193.515
37	51	Regan Smith	Phoenix Racing	Chevrolet	46.609	193.096
38	7	Dave Blaney	Tommy Baldwin Racing	Chevrolet	46.633	192.996
39	47	Bobby Labonte	JTG Daugherty Racing	Toyota	46.738	192.563
40	36	J. J. Yeley	Tommy Baldwin Racing	Chevrolet	46.852	192.024
41	83	David Reutimann	BK Racing	Toyota	47.284	190.339
42	93	Travis Kvapil	BK Racing	Toyota	47.333	190.142
43	87	Joe Nemechek	NEMCO-Jay Robinson Racing	Toyota	47.357	190.046
44	19	Mike Bliss	Humphrey Smith Racing	Toyota	47.509	189.438
45	52	Brian Keselowski	Hamilton Means Racing	Toyota	48.946	183.876

=== Starting grid ===
Pos	No.	Driver	Team	Manufacturer	Notes
1	10	Danica Patrick	Stewart–Haas Racing	Chevrolet	Pole winner
2	24	Jeff Gordon	Hendrick Motorsports	Chevrolet	Outside pole winner
3	29	Kevin Harvick	Richard Childress Racing	Chevrolet	Duel race 1 winner
4	18	Kyle Busch	Joe Gibbs Racing	Toyota	Duel race 2 winner
5	16	Greg Biffle	Roush Fenway Racing	Ford	
6	5	Kasey Kahne	Hendrick Motorsports	Chevrolet	
7	42	Juan Pablo Montoya	Earnhardt Ganassi Racing	Chevrolet	
8	33	Austin Dillon	Richard Childress Racing	Chevrolet	
9	48	Jimmie Johnson	Hendrick Motorsports	Chevrolet	
10	15	Clint Bowyer	Michael Waltrip Racing	Toyota	
11	78	Kurt Busch	Furniture Row Racing	Chevrolet	
12	20	Matt Kenseth	Joe Gibbs Racing	Toyota	
13	14	Tony Stewart	Stewart–Haas Racing	Chevrolet	
14	55	Mark Martin	Michael Waltrip Racing	Toyota	
15	2	Brad Keselowski	Penske Racing	Ford	
16	27	Paul Menard	Richard Childress Racing	Chevrolet	
17	13	Casey Mears	Germain Racing	Ford	
18	31	Jeff Burton	Richard Childress Racing	Chevrolet	
19	88	Dale Earnhardt Jr.	Hendrick Motorsports	Chevrolet	
20	1	Jamie McMurray	Earnhardt Ganassi Racing	Chevrolet	
21	22	Joey Logano	Penske Racing	Ford	
22	34	David Ragan	Front Row Motorsports	Ford	
23	47	Bobby Labonte	JTG Daugherty Racing	Toyota	
24	9	Marcos Ambrose	Richard Petty Motorsports	Ford	
25	38	David Gilliland	Front Row Motorsports	Ford	
26	43	Aric Almirola	Richard Petty Motorsports	Ford	
27	87	Joe Nemechek	NEMCO-Jay Robinson Racing	Toyota	
28	17	Ricky Stenhouse Jr.	Roush Fenway Racing	Ford	
29	26	Michael Waltrip	Swan Racing	Toyota	
30	7	Dave Blaney	Tommy Baldwin Racing	Chevrolet	
31	95	Scott Speed	Leavine Family Racing	Ford	Duel race 1 transfer
32	35	Josh Wise	Front Row Motorsports	Ford	Duel race 2 transfer
33	21	Trevor Bayne	Wood Brothers Racing	Ford	Speed provisional (195.976 mph)
34	39	Ryan Newman	Stewart–Haas Racing	Chevrolet	Speed provisional (195.946 mph)
35	11	Denny Hamlin	Joe Gibbs Racing	Toyota	Speed provisional (195.771 mph)
36	99	Carl Edwards	Roush Fenway Racing	Ford	Speed provisional (195.240 mph)
37	56	Martin Truex Jr.	Michael Waltrip Racing	Toyota	Owner's points provisional
38	51	Regan Smith	Phoenix Racing	Chevrolet	Owner's points provisional
39	93	Travis Kvapil	BK Racing	Toyota	Owner's points provisional
40	83	David Reutimann	BK Racing	Toyota	Owner's points provisional
41	32	Terry Labonte	FAS Lane Racing	Ford	Owner's points provisional
42	36	J. J. Yeley	Tommy Baldwin Racing	Chevrolet	Owner's points provisional
43	98	Michael McDowell	Phil Parsons Racing	Ford	Owner's points provisional
Did not qualify
	19	Mike Bliss	Humphrey Smith Racing	Toyota	
	52	Brian Keselowski	Hamilton Means Racing	Toyota	

== Crash at the DRIVE4COPD 300 ==
On February 23, a 14-car crash in the DRIVE4COPD 300 left 33 spectators injured. On the final lap of the Nationwide Series race, Regan Smith got turned into the wall while trying to block Brad Keselowski, causing a chain reaction, in which Kyle Larson's car flew into the catch fencing. The impact ripped out its engine on the pathway in between the fence and first row of the grandstands. A tire and some other debris flew over the fence and landed halfway up the stands. "I didn't know what to think. I'm an emotional person and I immediately started to cry. It was very scary. Absolutely scary", a spectator remarked. Local officials reported that 19 people were taken to the hospital, including two in critical condition, while others were treated on-site at the infield care center. The incident raised questions about safety at Daytona International Speedway. NASCAR chose to repair the catch fencing overnight and have the Daytona 500 go on as scheduled.

== Race ==
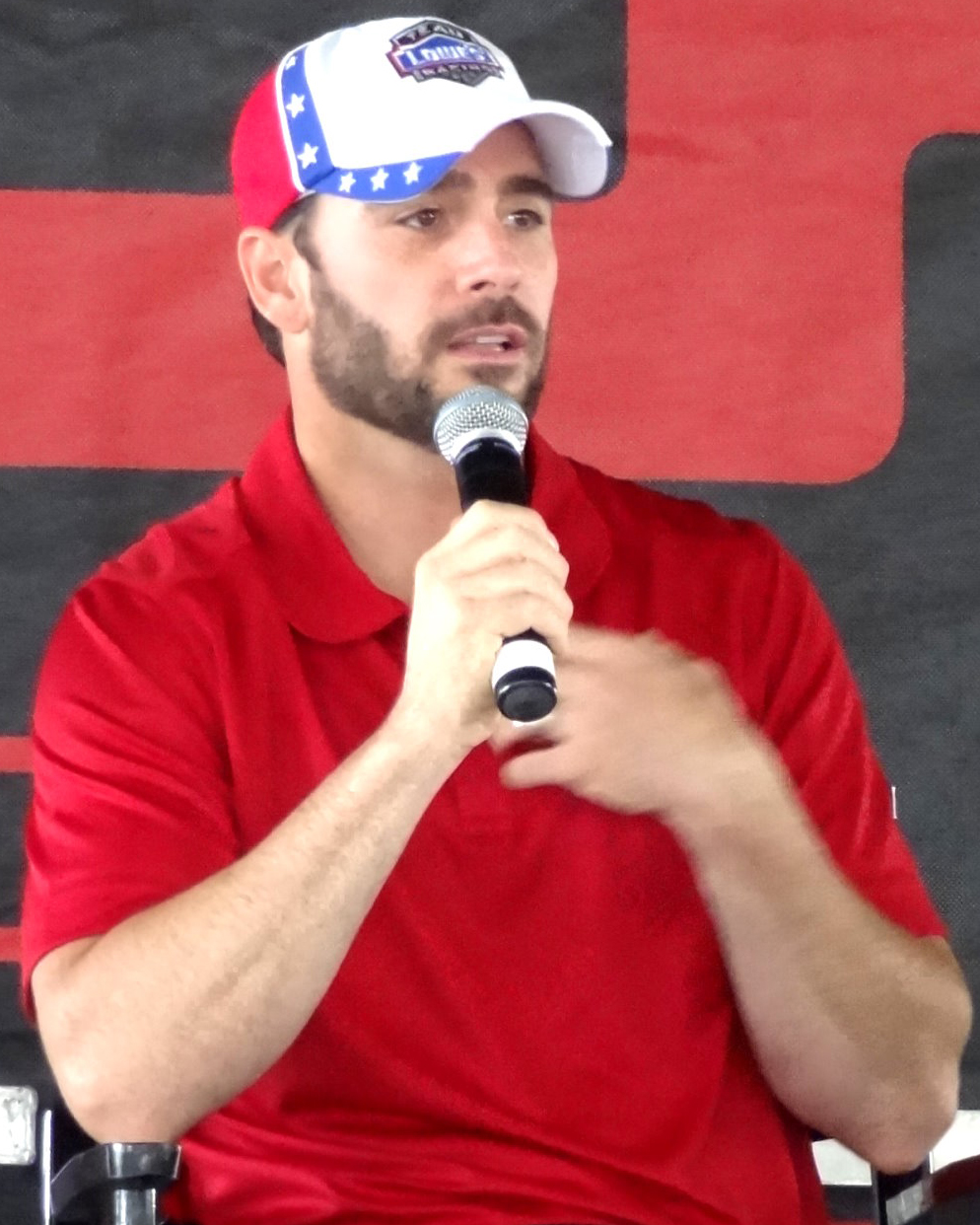
Jimmie Johnson won the race in his 400th start.

There were 28 lead changes among 14 different drivers. Danica Patrick stayed in the limelight, running in the Top 10 all afternoon. On lap 90, she passed Michael Waltrip on a restart following a caution, which was brought out for debris, and she became the first woman to lead the Daytona 500. In total, she led on three separate occasions for a total of 5 laps.

Several pre-race favorites struggled. There were two major wrecks that occurred during the race: The first one was on lap 33. This began when Kyle Busch, heading into turn 1, turned Kasey Kahne into the infield. As the field checked up, a total of 6 more cars were collected: Tony Stewart, Kevin Harvick, Jamie McMurray, Casey Mears, Juan Pablo Montoya, and Brad Keselowski. Later, on lap 136, as cars checked up in front of them in turn 2, Keselowski got turned sideways by Trevor Bayne, who then got sideways himself, came up the track, and collected 7 more cars (totaling nine in all): Austin Dillon, Carl Edwards; Ricky Stenhouse Jr.; David Ragan, David Gilliland, Josh Wise, and Terry Labonte. Jeff Gordon led the first 31 laps, but soon his car kept overheating and he never threatened the leaders after dropping back on lap 32, finishing 20th. Matt Kenseth led the most laps, at 86, but his day ended on lap 150 with an engine failure.

Jimmie Johnson, racing in his 400th career Sprint Cup start, was back in the field for most of the race. He emerged from the pack with 16 laps to go and seized control with 10 to go, racing past Keselowski on the final restart. A caution with six laps to go for debris bunched up the field, but Johnson held on staving off a last lap charge by Dale Earnhardt Jr. and Mark Martin. "I had a lot of confidence those final few laps, leading the train," Johnson said. "I knew just how fast this car was." Keselowski finished fourth. Greg Biffle and Danica Patrick had entered the final lap in second and third place respectively before both were shuffled back by Earnhardt and Martin. Patrick finished eighth, becoming the first woman to finish in the top ten at the Daytona 500. She blamed inexperience for the late fall, saying "I didn't know what to do, exactly" in the final scramble. Johnson, however, said that Patrick looked "really comfortable" all race. "She held a great wheel, was smooth, took advantage of runs when she had them."

Johnson became the sixth driver to win a race in his 400th Sprint Cup start, following Lee Petty, Richard Petty, David Pearson, Dave Marcis, and Dale Earnhardt. It also marked the first NASCAR win for Schuberth.

=== Race results ===
Pos	No.	Driver	Team	Manufacturer	Laps	Led	Points
1	48	Jimmie Johnson (W)	Hendrick Motorsports	Chevrolet	200	17	47
2	88	Dale Earnhardt Jr. (W)	Hendrick Motorsports	Chevrolet	200	0	42
3	55	Mark Martin	Michael Waltrip Racing	Toyota	200	0	41
4	2	Brad Keselowski	Penske Racing	Ford	200	13	41
5	39	Ryan Newman (W)	Stewart–Haas Racing	Chevrolet	200	3	40
6	16	Greg Biffle	Roush Fenway Racing	Ford	200	0	38
7	51	Regan Smith	Phoenix Racing	Chevrolet	200	1	–
8	10	Danica Patrick	Stewart–Haas Racing	Chevrolet	200	6	37
9	98	Michael McDowell	Phil Parsons Racing	Ford	200	0	35
10	36	J. J. Yeley	Tommy Baldwin Racing	Chevrolet	200	0	34
11	15	Clint Bowyer	Michael Waltrip Racing	Toyota	200	1	34
12	17	Ricky Stenhouse Jr.	Roush Fenway Racing	Ford	200	0	32
13	43	Aric Almirola	Richard Petty Motorsports	Ford	200	0	31
14	11	Denny Hamlin	Joe Gibbs Racing	Toyota	200	33	31
15	47	Bobby Labonte	JTG Daugherty Racing	Toyota	200	0	29
16	83	David Reutimann	BK Racing	Toyota	200	0	28
17	7	Dave Blaney	Tommy Baldwin Racing	Chevrolet	200	0	27
18	9	Marcos Ambrose	Richard Petty Motorsports	Ford	200	0	26
19	22	Joey Logano	Penske Racing	Ford	200	2	26
20	24	Jeff Gordon (W)	Hendrick Motorsports	Chevrolet	200	31	25
21	27	Paul Menard	Richard Childress Racing	Chevrolet	200	1	24
22	26	Michael Waltrip (W)	Swan Racing	Toyota	200	4	23
23	95	Scott Speed	Leavine Family Racing	Ford	200	2	22
24	56	Martin Truex Jr.	Michael Waltrip Racing	Toyota	200	0	20
25	93	Travis Kvapil	BK Racing	Toyota	199	1	20
26	32	Terry Labonte	FAS Lane Racing	Ford	199	0	18
27	21	Trevor Bayne (W)	Wood Brothers Racing	Ford	198	0	–
28	78	Kurt Busch	Furniture Row Racing	Chevrolet	195	0	16
29	13	Casey Mears	Germain Racing	Ford	181	0	15
30	31	Jeff Burton	Richard Childress Racing	Chevrolet	176	0	14
31	33	Austin Dillon (R)	Richard Childress Racing	Chevrolet	175	0	–
32	1	Jamie McMurray (W)	Earnhardt Ganassi Racing	Chevrolet	161	0	12
33	99	Carl Edwards	Roush Fenway Racing	Ford	159	0	11
34	18	Kyle Busch	Joe Gibbs Racing	Toyota	151	0	10
35	34	David Ragan	Front Row Motorsports	Ford	150	0	9
36	5	Kasey Kahne	Hendrick Motorsports	Chevrolet	150	0	8
37	20	Matt Kenseth (W)	Joe Gibbs Racing	Toyota	149	86	9
38	38	David Gilliland	Front Row Motorsports	Ford	144	0	6
39	42	Juan Pablo Montoya	Earnhardt Ganassi Racing	Chevrolet	144	0	5
40	35	Josh Wise (R)	Front Row Motorsports	Ford	137	0	–
41	14	Tony Stewart	Stewart–Haas Racing	Chevrolet	118	0	3
42	29	Kevin Harvick (W)	Richard Childress Racing	Chevrolet	47	0	2
43	87	Joe Nemechek	NEMCO-Jay Robinson Racing	Toyota	42	0	–

== Standings after the race ==
Drivers' Championship standings

Pos	Driver	Points
1	Jimmie Johnson	47
2	Dale Earnhardt Jr.	42
3	Mark Martin	41
4	Brad Keselowski	41
5	Ryan Newman	40

Manufacturers' Championship standings

Pos	Manufacturer	Points
1	Chevrolet	9
2	Toyota	6
3	Ford	4

- Note: Only the first twelve positions are included for the driver standings.

Previous race: 2012 Ford EcoBoost 400	Sprint Cup Series; 2013 season	Next race: 2013 Subway Fresh Fit 500
