= QGF-03 =

Combat helmet of China's PLA

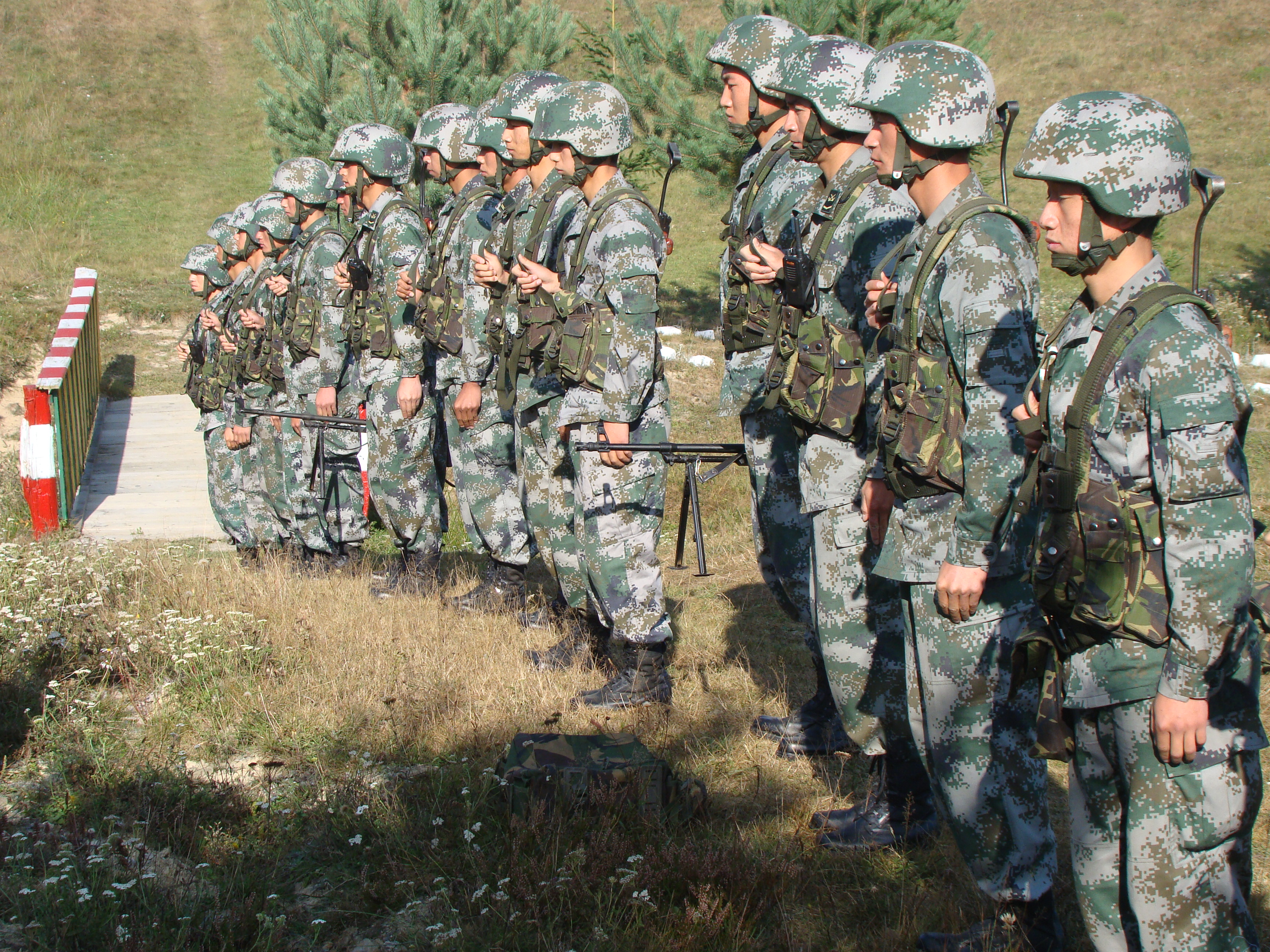
Soldiers wearing the QGF-03

The QGF-03 helmet (Chinese: QGF03钢盔) is a combat helmet deployed by the People's Liberation Army in 2005. The helmet, like its predecessor the QGF-02, is made from a Kevlar composite material and replaces older steel helmets such as the GK80 for frontline troops.

== History ==
The QGF-03 is being replaced by the QGF-11 (Type 11) and the Type 15A helmet, based on a tender notice issued by the PLA on August 4, 2017.

== Development ==
The QGF-03 helmet was a development from the first Chinese kevlar helmet, the QGF-02, first produced in 1994 and issued to units such as the Hong Kong Garrison and the Macao Garrison. The QGF-02 was intended to be lighter than the existing steel helmets and ballistically equivalent to the US PASGT helmet.

The development of the helmet was based on the Gefechtshelm M92. It later changed to use the MICH helmet as a basis.

== Users ==
- China
- Guyana
- Kenya: Reportedly used by Kenyan soldiers.
