= Helme =

Helme may refer to:

- G.W. Helme Snuff Mill Historic District, historic district in Helmetta, New Jersey
- Helme (river), a river in central Germany
- Helme Parish, a rural municipality in Valga County, Estonia
- Helme, Estonia, a small borough (alevik) in Tõrva Parish, Estonia
- Helme Tobacco Company, American snuff company started by George Washington Helme
- Helme–Worthy Store and Residence, a historic American home and attached storefront
- Helme, West Yorkshire, a hamlet in England
- Schuberth Helme, a German producer of safety helmets

== People with that surname ==
- Chris Helme (born 1971), British singer-songwriter
- Christopher Helme (1603 – c. 1650), early immigrant to the Massachusetts Bay Colony and one of the founders of Exeter, New Hampshire
- Elizabeth Helme (died c. 1814), English novelist and translator of the 18th century
- George Washington Helme (1822–1893), American founder of Helmetta, New Jersey
- Gerry Helme (1923–1981), British rugby league footballer
- Helle-Moonika Helme (born 1966), Estonian musician and politician
- Mart Helme (born 1949), Estonian politician, diplomat and historian
- Martin Helme (born 1976), Estonian politician
- Peeter Helme (born 1978), Estonian writer, journalist, and literary critic
- Rein Helme (1954–2003), Estonian politician
- Sirje Helme (born 1949), Estonian art historian and critic

== People with that given name ==
- Helme Heine (1941–2025), German writer, illustrator and designer

== See also ==
- Helm (disambiguation)
