= GK80 =

Chinese combat helmet

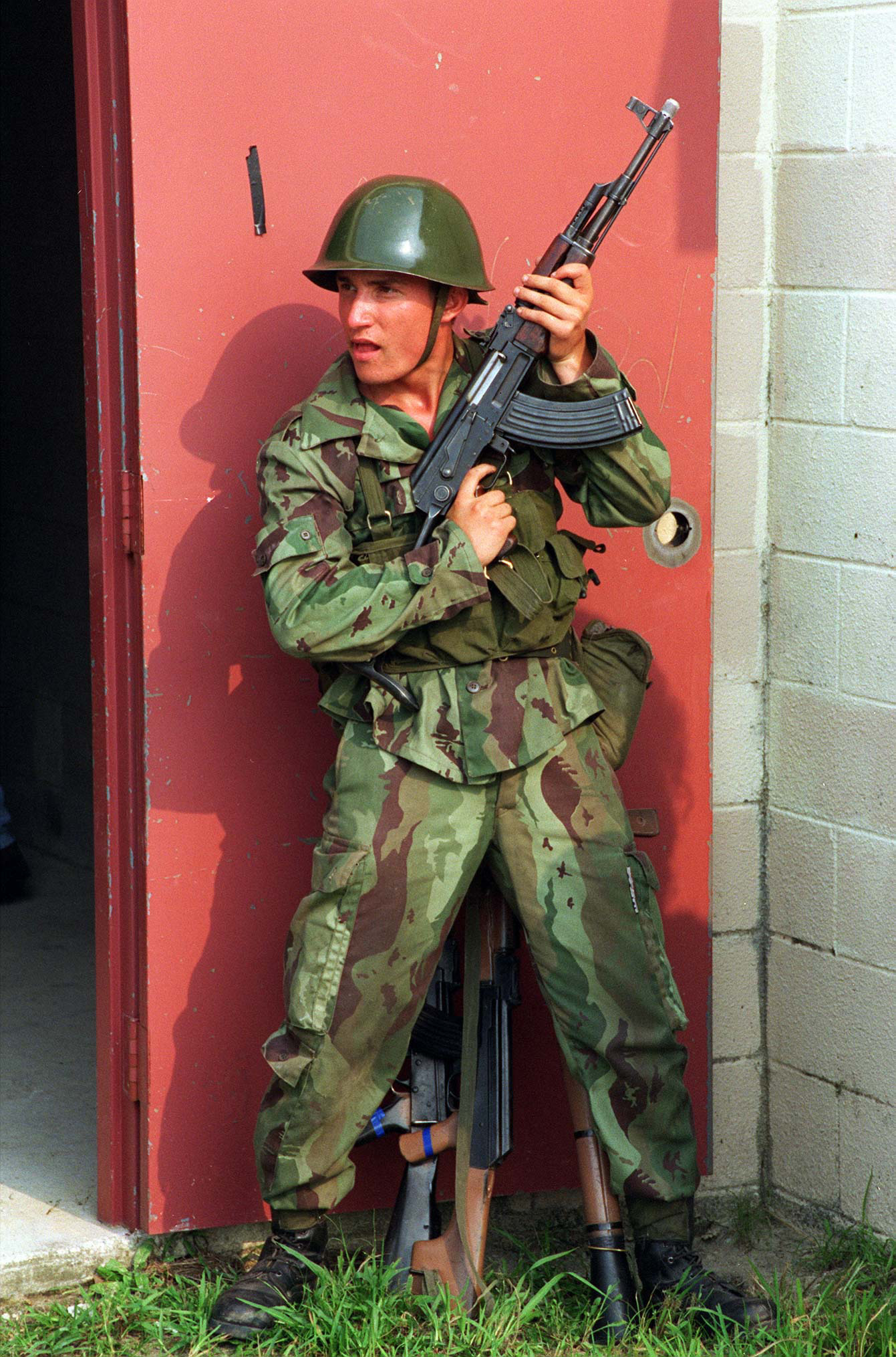
- Albanian soldier wearing the early "Type 69" variant of the GK80.
- Type: Combat Helmet
- Place of origin: China

Service history
- In service: 1980-present
- Used by: See Users
- Wars: Myanmar conflict Western Sahara War; Sino-Vietnamese War; Sino-Vietnamese conflicts (1979–1991); Algerian Civil War; Houthi insurgency in Yemen; Yemeni Civil War (2014-present); Myanmar Civil War

Production history
- Variants: Type 69, GK80A

Specifications
- Weight: 1.10–1.25 kg

The GK80 (Chinese: GK80钢盔) is a Chinese steel combat helmet first developed in the late 1960s. Developed as part of a Chinese military aid package to Albania in response to the Sino-Soviet split, the helmet was initially designated as the "Type 69" and was only issued in small numbers within the People's Liberation Army. An improved design was re-designated as the GK80 and was adopted as the standard combat helmet of the PLA in 1980. The move was part of a PLA modernization program immediately after encountering drawbacks in the Sino-Vietnamese War in 1979, when the PLA realized the necessity to modernize its arsenal.

The GK80 in PLA service is being replaced by the aramid construction QGF02/03 helmets.

== Users ==
- Albania
- Algeria
- Cape Verde
- China
- Islamic Republic of Afghanistan
- SADR: Sahrawi People's Liberation Army
- Yemen

=== Non-state users ===
- Kachin Independence Army
- National Democratic Alliance Army
- Myanmar National Democratic Alliance Army
- United Wa State Army
- Arakan Army

== Gallery ==
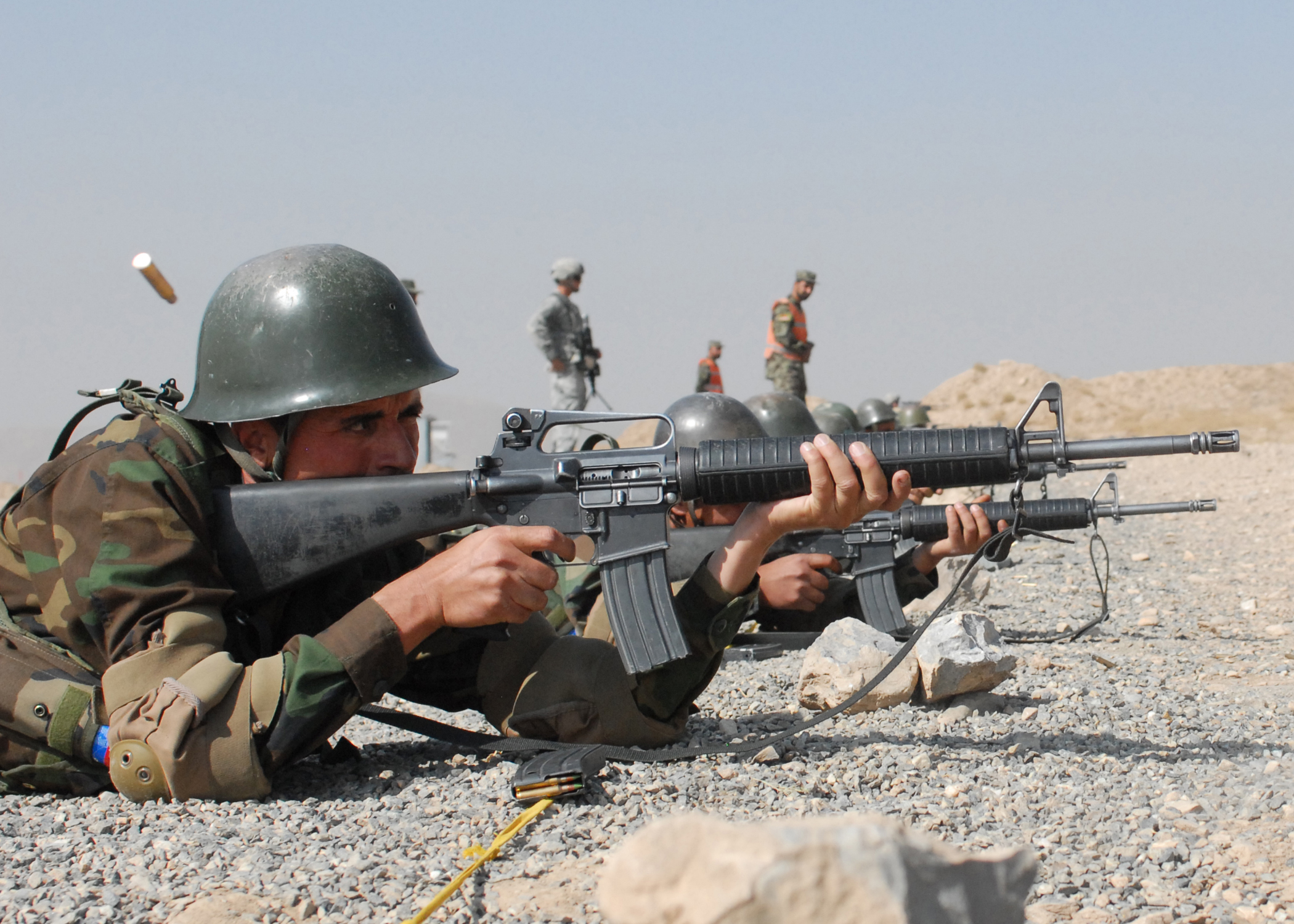
Afghan National Army officer cadet wearing GK80A.

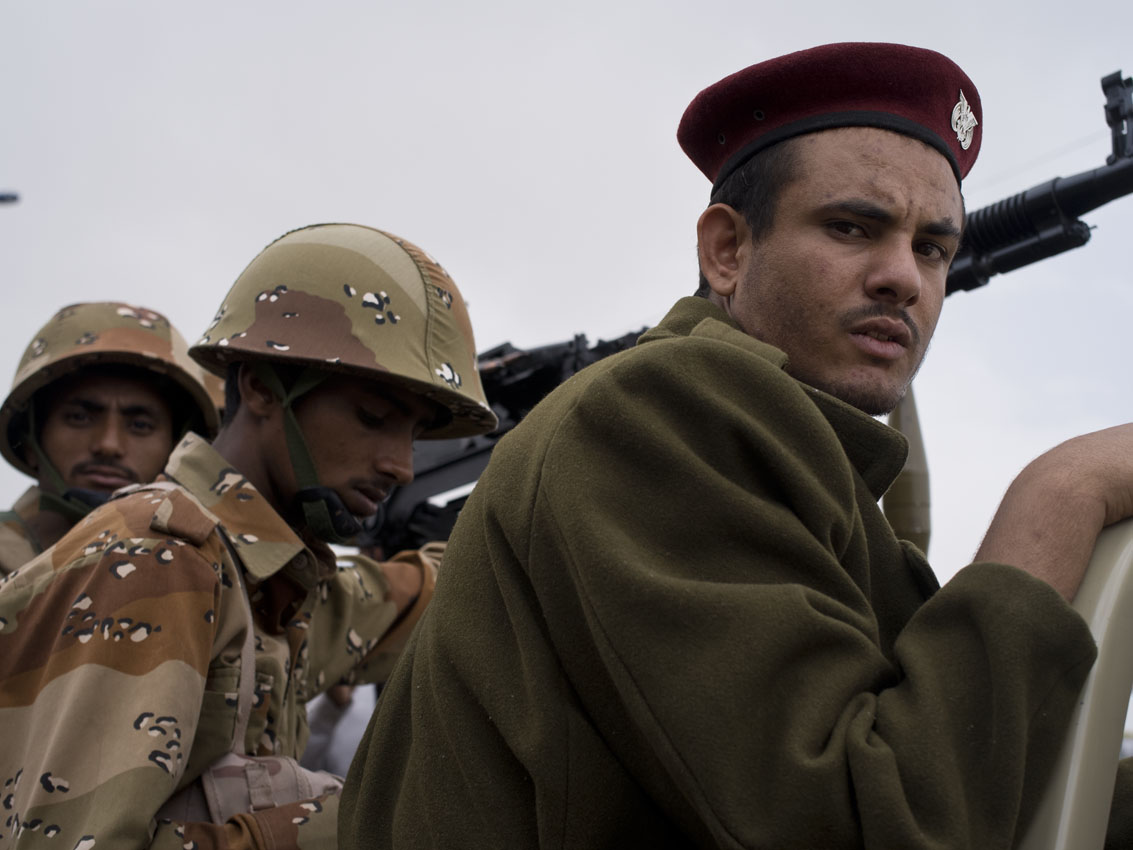
Yemeni soldiers wearing GK80 helmet.

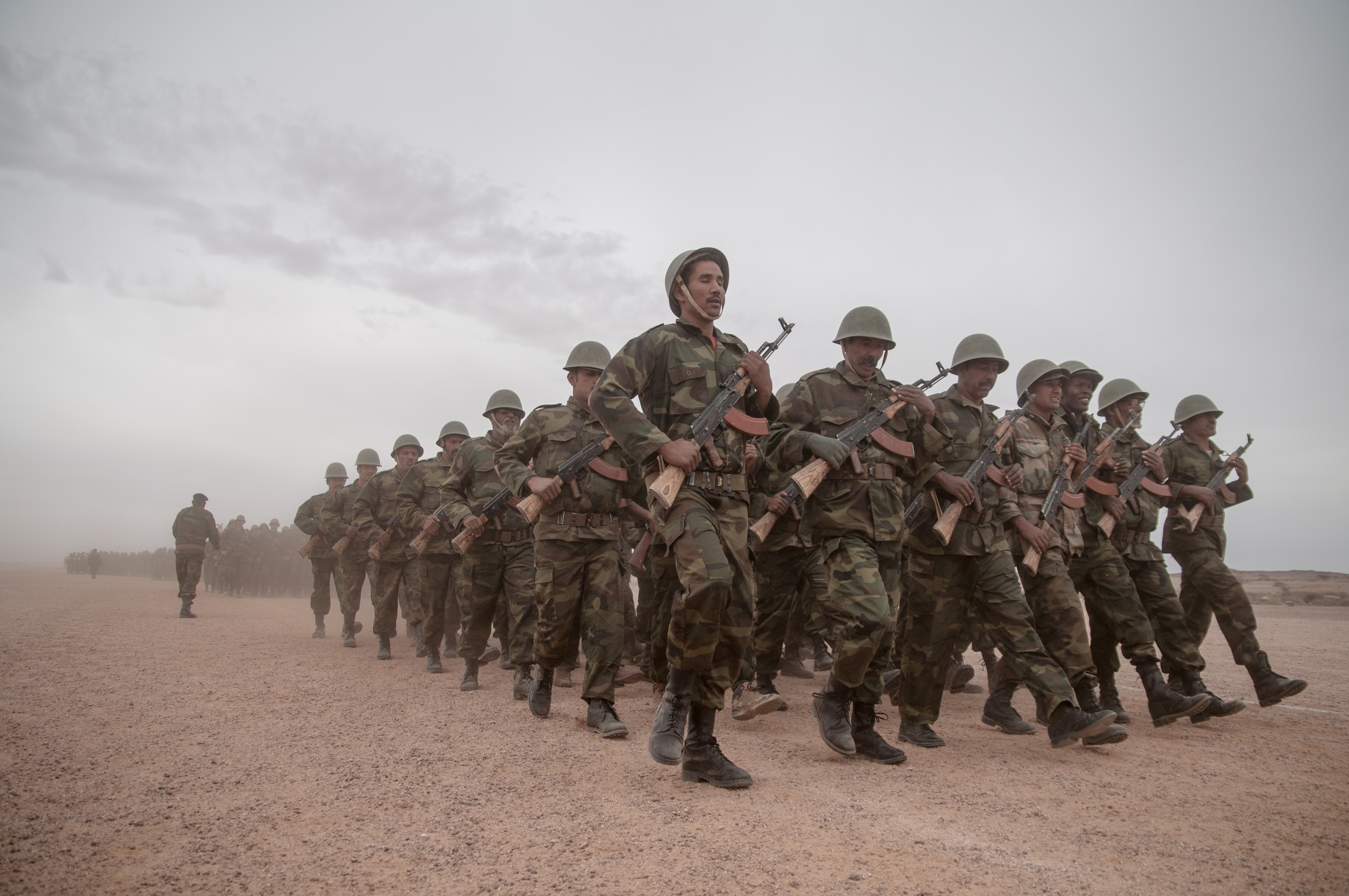
Marching Sahrawi People's Liberation Army soldiers with GK80 helmets.
