= Gefechtshelm M92 =

German combat helmet

Gefechtshelm Schuberth B826
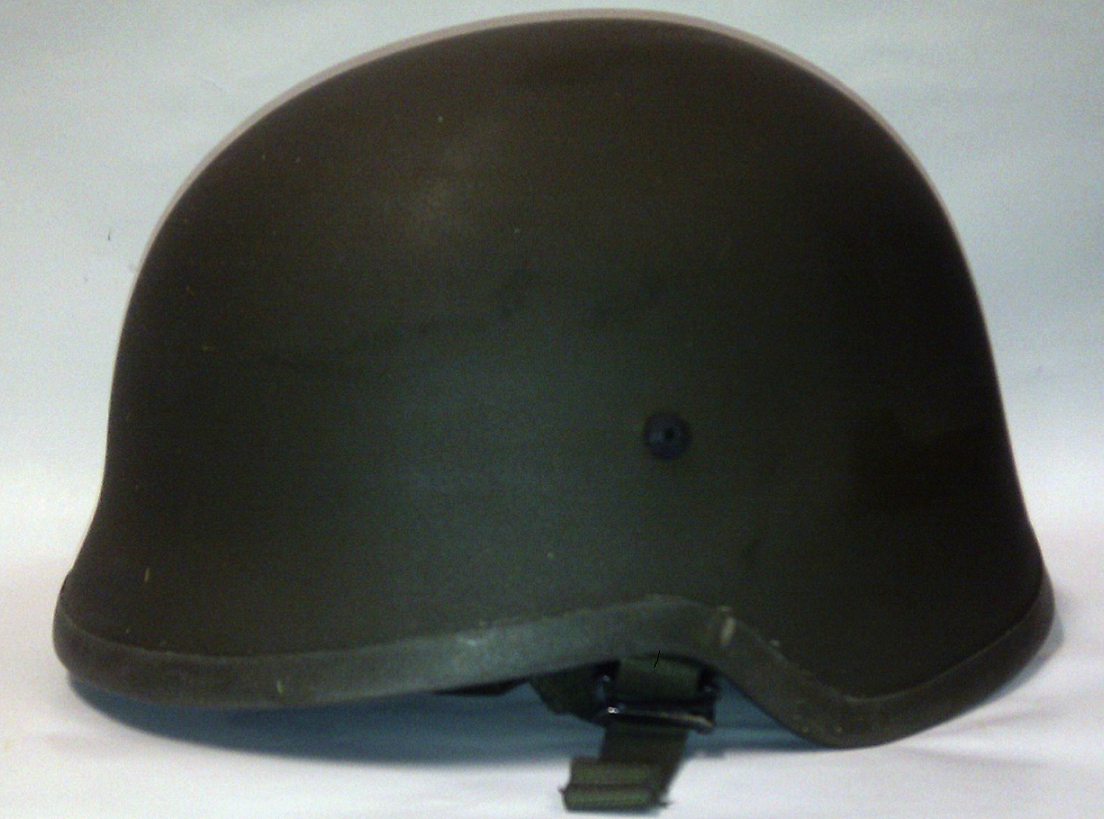
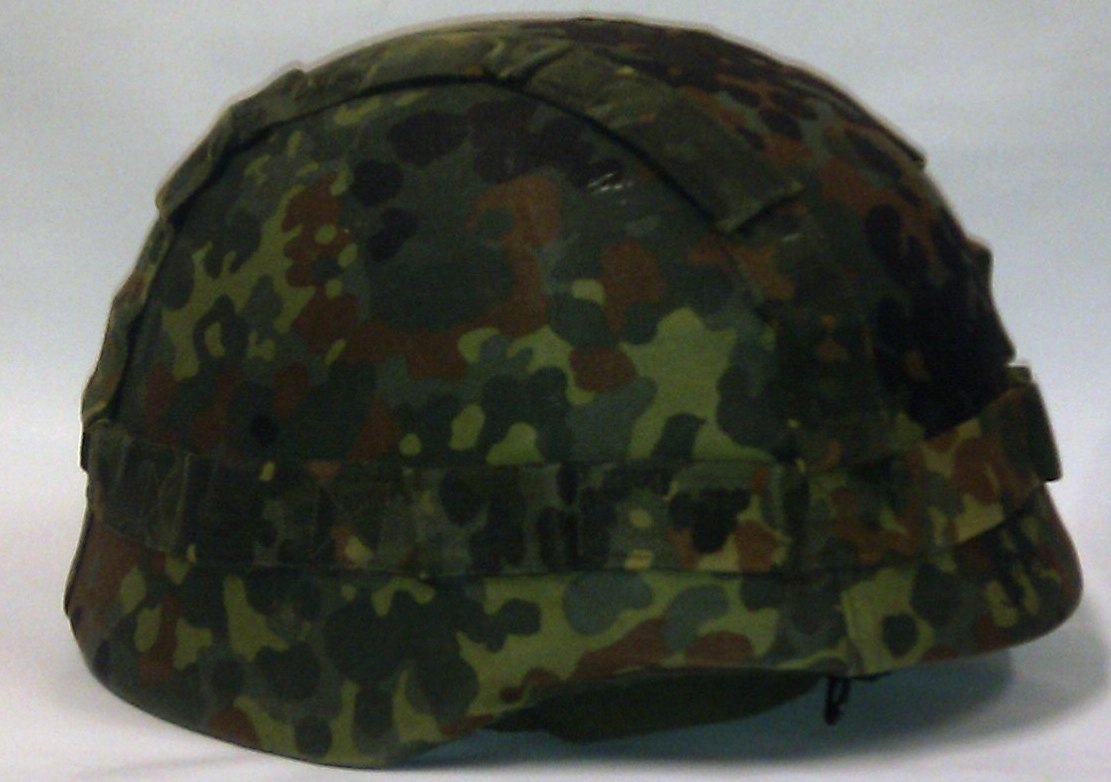
- A Gefechtshelm Schuberth B826 without and with cover
- Type: Combat helmet
- Place of origin: Germany

Service history
- In service: 1992–present
- Used by: See Users
- Wars: Bosnian War; War in Afghanistan; War in Donbas; 2022 Russian invasion of Ukraine

Production history
- Designer: Schuberth GmbH
- Manufacturer: Schuberth GmbH/Induyco
- Produced: 1992–present
- Variants: See Variants

Specifications (Size II Helmet)
- Weight: 1.5 kg (3.3 lb)

The Gefechtshelm M92 (or Gefechtshelm Schuberth B826) is the standard issue combat helmet of the Bundeswehr, first fielded in 1992 as a replacement of earlier M1A1 helmets that were previously used during the Cold War. It is made from Aramid composite materials and is used by all branches of the Bundeswehr.

== History ==
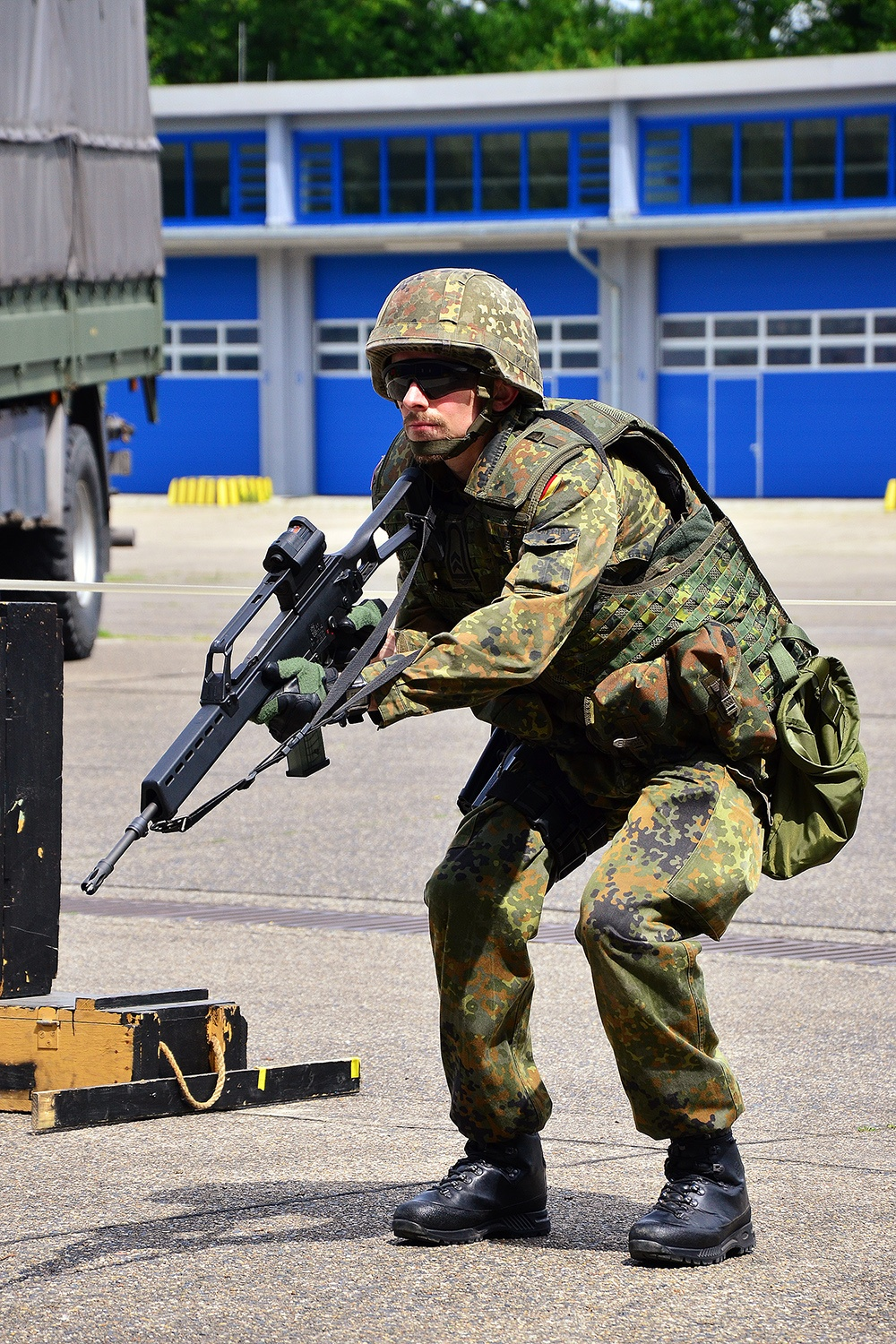
A Bundeswehr soldier with his basic gear, including a G36 rifle and the M92 helmet.

The Federal Office of Defense Technology and Procurement (Bundesamt für Wehrtechnik und Beschaffung) commissioned the Federal Ministry of Defence to investigate new helmet concepts at the end of the 1960s. In order to achieve a higher impact strength, different materials were tested, including titanium and plastics. However, at that time the use of titanium helmets was uneconomical due to the high production costs, while plastics were not mature enough at the time to meet military demands; composite materials were also checked. The shape of the helmet is similar to the U.S. PASGT helmet.

The first M92 was issued in 1992 to the Bundeswehr. Pakistan and Singapore were known to have received 826 helmets for field testing for potential adoption.

In May 2015, it was reported that the German Ministry of Defense is considering to replace all M92s used by the Bundeswehr. This is due to problems in the helmet's production where loose bolts were able to escape from inspections.

=== Development ===
Induyco SA München developed the M92 based on the MARTE helmet of the Spanish Army, consisting of 29 layers of aramid fiber.

The development costs amounted to DM2.64 million. Helmets were supplied by Schuberth GmbH and from the Spanish supplier Induyco.

The helmet is marketed with four head sizes and a standard RAL 6014 olive drab color finish with other colors/finishes available as requested. Its standard accessories include a camouflage helmet cover and a communication headset. M92 helmet covers used by the Bundeswehr have a reversible white or Flecktarn temperate camouflage. In deployments to arid regions, a Tropentarn or desert camouflage cover is used. A blue cover is used for United Nations peacekeeping duties.

Variations of the helmets marketed outside Germany are sold with chin straps made on the left or right side with either Schuberth or Induyco markings.

== Variants ==
Variants consists of the following:

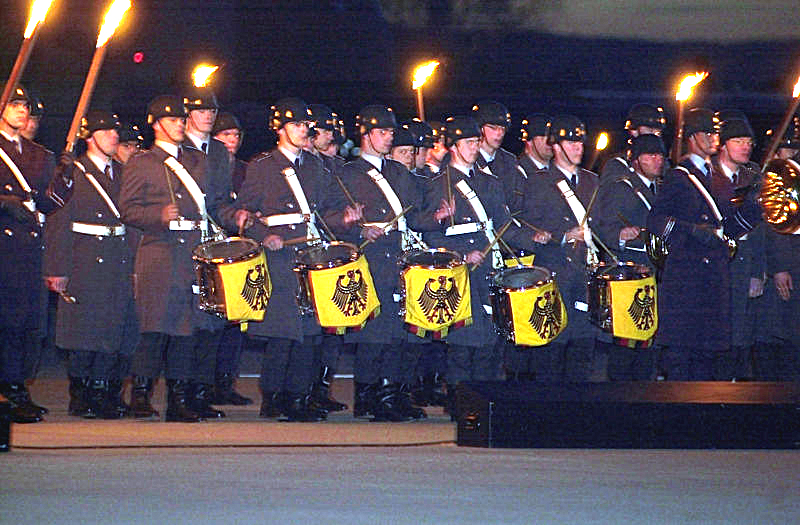
Bundeswehr bandsmen wearing the 826D parade helmet in 2002.

- Combat 826: Basic M92 helmet made for the Bundeswehr. (Note: As of March 2019, the Combat 826 is not being advertised on Schuberth's official website.)
- 826D: a lightweight plastic parade version, replacing the M56 liner for ceremonial use in 1999.
- M828: a paratroop version without the front peak and with a reduced flare to the brim.
- 826 Swiss Armed Forces: M92 helmet made under Swiss and NATO standards for the Swiss military.

== Users ==
=== Current ===
- Albania: Used by Albanian Land Force.
- Austria: Used by Austrian Federal Police.
- Bahrain: Has M92s outfitted with M1 helmet-based suspension system.
- Belgium: Used by the Belgian Armed Forces. Issued in 1995.
- Czech Republic: Uses the M92 made under license as the Petris P-3001.
- Denmark: Used by the Danish Armed Forces in domestic and overseas operations (including UN peacekeeping operations)
- Germany: Issued to the Bundeswehr in 1992. Used by GSG-9 with black covers.
- Indonesia: Used by certain military unit. Refitted with local standard liner.
- Kurdistan: Provided by Germany to Peshmerga in their fight against Islamic State.
- Netherlands: Used both Schuberth and Induyco-made version for the Dutch military, under the name komposiet Gevechtshelm M95. Issued in 1995.
- Norway: Issued to the Norwegian military.
- Switzerland: Known in the Swiss military as the Schutzhelm 04 (in German) and casque de protection balistique 04 (in French).
- International Committee of the Red Cross: some examples were sent to IRC in Geneva.
- Ukraine: 58,000 helmets were donated by Germany since 2022.

=== Former ===
- Austria: Formerly used by the Austrian Gendarmerie.
