= Helms (disambiguation) =

Helms is a surname. It may also refer to:

- Helms Athletic Foundation
- Helms Bakery, an industrial bakery in California from 1931 to 1969
- Helmsburg, Indiana, an unincorporated community also known as Helms
- Helms Creek, California
- Helms Formation, a geologic formation in Texas
