= Helm, California =

Unincorporated community in California, United States

Helm
- Unincorporated community
- Location in California Helm (the United States)
- Coordinates: 36°31′54″N 120°05′54″W
- Country: United States
- State: California
- County: Fresno
- Elevation: 187 ft (57 m)

Helm is an unincorporated community in Fresno County, California, United States. It is located 13 miles (21 km) south of Kerman, at an elevation of 187 feet (57 m).

== History ==
The city was named after William Helm, the largest individual sheep farmer who arrived in Fresno in 1877. The town was built on the Hanford and Summit Lake Railway (later the Hardwick-Ingle or Riverdale Branch of the Southern Pacific Railroad, now abandoned), constructed in 1912.

The first post office was opened in Helm in 1913. The ZIP code is 93627.
