= John Henry Helms =

- Born: March 16, 1874; Chicago, Illinois, U.S.
- Died: February 17, 1919 (aged 44); Kankakee, Illinois, U.S.
- Burial place: Mound Grove Cemetery, Kankakee, Illinois
- Military career
- Allegiance: United States
- Branch: United States Marine Corps
- Service years: 1897–1919
- Rank: Sergeant
- Unit: USS Chicago
- Awards: Medal of Honor

John Henry Helms (March 16, 1874 – February 17, 1919) was a United States Marine and a recipient of the United States military's highest decoration, the Medal of Honor, for saving a shipmate from drowning.

== Biography ==
Helms was born on March 16, 1874, in Chicago, Illinois, and enlisted in the Marines on July 6, 1897, at the Marine Corps headquarters in Washington, D.C. At one point in his service, he jumped overboard from a tugboat in rough seas and rescued a drowning sailor, Fireman Second Class W. Gallagher.

Helms later served as a sergeant aboard the USS Chicago, the flagship of the South Atlantic Squadron. On January 10, 1901, the Chicago was anchored in the harbor of Montevideo, Uruguay, and the crew was allowed to go swimming. One sailor, Warrant Officer's Steward Ishi Tomizi, (Note: Helms' official Medal of Honor citation gives the rescued man's surname as "Tomizi"; however other sources give "Tomasi" or "Tomazo".) began struggling in the water and was "in imminent danger of drowning." Helms jumped overboard in full uniform and saved the man.

For this action, Helms was awarded the Medal of Honor, although his nomination was not without controversy. Noncombat awards had been authorized by statute since 1861, but fell under greater scrutiny in the twentieth century after the Army expressly required combat action in its first regulations of 1889. Later, Congress imposed the requirement on the Navy by statute in 1919, although the Navy then chose to follow the earlier law, which permitted noncombat awards of the medal until the statute was finally repealed in 1963. The last non-combat Navy Medal of Honor was awarded in 1945, although the Department of the Navy attempted to award a non-combat Medal of Honor as late as the Korean War. The noncombat Medal of Honor was eventually replaced by the Navy and Marine Corps Medal.

Helms was first recommended for the Medal of Honor by the Chicago's captain, Charles H. Rockwell. The nomination was endorsed by Admiral Winfield Scott Schley, commander of the South Atlantic Squadron, and forwarded to the Bureau of Navigation, which was in charge of personnel affairs. The bureau chief, Admiral Arent S. Crowninshield, advised that the nomination be rejected. Crowninshield believed that, since the Chicago had been at anchor in calm seas, Helms' actions did not put himself in danger and did not constitute "extraordinary heroism." The Commandant of the Marine Corps, General Charles Heywood, felt otherwise, stating that Helms "displayed extraordinary heroism in saving lives at the risk of his own." The final decision was made by the Secretary of the Navy, John Davis Long. Long agreed with Crowninshield that the rescue of Tomizi by itself was not sufficient for the decoration, but added that Helms' previous rescue of Gallagher and the endorsements by Admiral Schley and General Heywood were enough to warrant the medal. Crowninshield's opposition to the award led to accusations of "snobbishness", with the Baltimore American alleging that Helms' nomination had been objected to because he was not a commissioned officer.

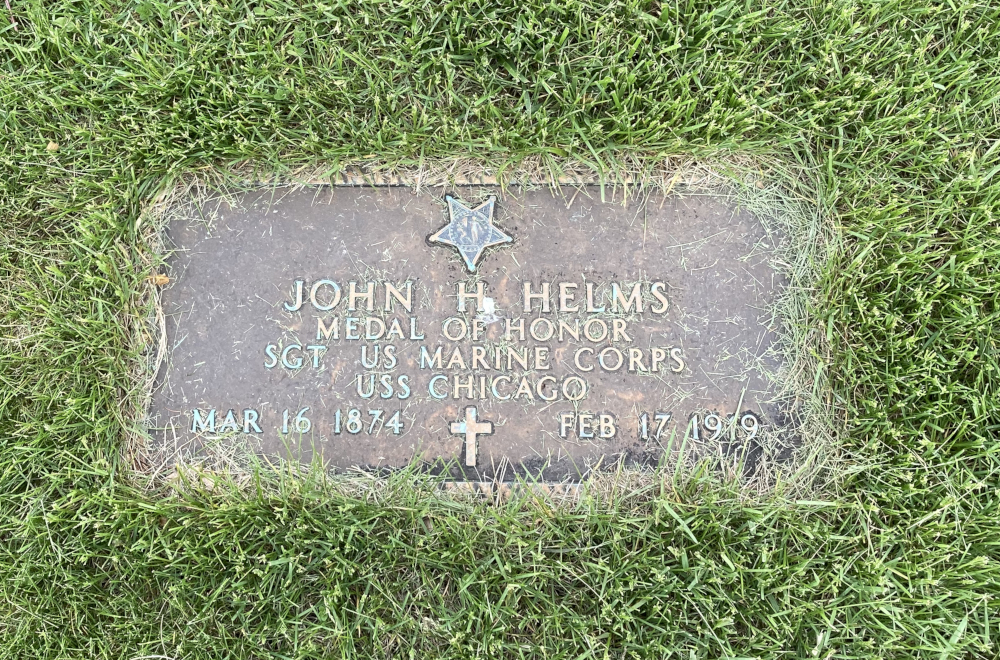
Helms' grave at Mound Grove Cemetery

Helms was officially awarded the Medal of Honor and a $100 gratuity on March 23, 1901, two and a half months after his rescue of Tomizi. His citation reads:

Serving on board the U.S.S. Chicago, for heroism in rescuing Ishi Tomizi, ship's cook, from drowning at Montevideo, Uruguay, 10 January 1901.

Helms died at age 44, while still serving in the Marine Corps. He was buried at Mound Grove Cemetery in Kankakee, Illinois.

== See also ==
- List of Medal of Honor recipients
