= Helm Canal =

Coordinates: 36.877°N 119.734°W

The Helm Canal is an aqueduct named after William Helm in Clovis, California, United States, involved in a series of water transfers to eliminate selenium bearing brackish waters to the San Joaquin River to bypass agricultural deliveries.

The Helm canal was previously used to irrigate numerous properties that were in agricultural usage and are presently converted to urban uses such as the site of the Clovis Towne Center. Topography in the locale of the Helm Canal is generally very level having been formed by alluvial fans. The elevation in the vicinity of the Helm Canal is approximately 350 ft (110 m) to 375 ft (114 m) above mean sea level datum.

== See also ==
- Surface runoff
- Sacramento River Delta
