= Mark Helm =

Mark Helm may refer to:

- Mark Helm (footballer)
- Levon Helm (Mark Lavon Helm), American musician
