= William Helm =

American sheep farmer

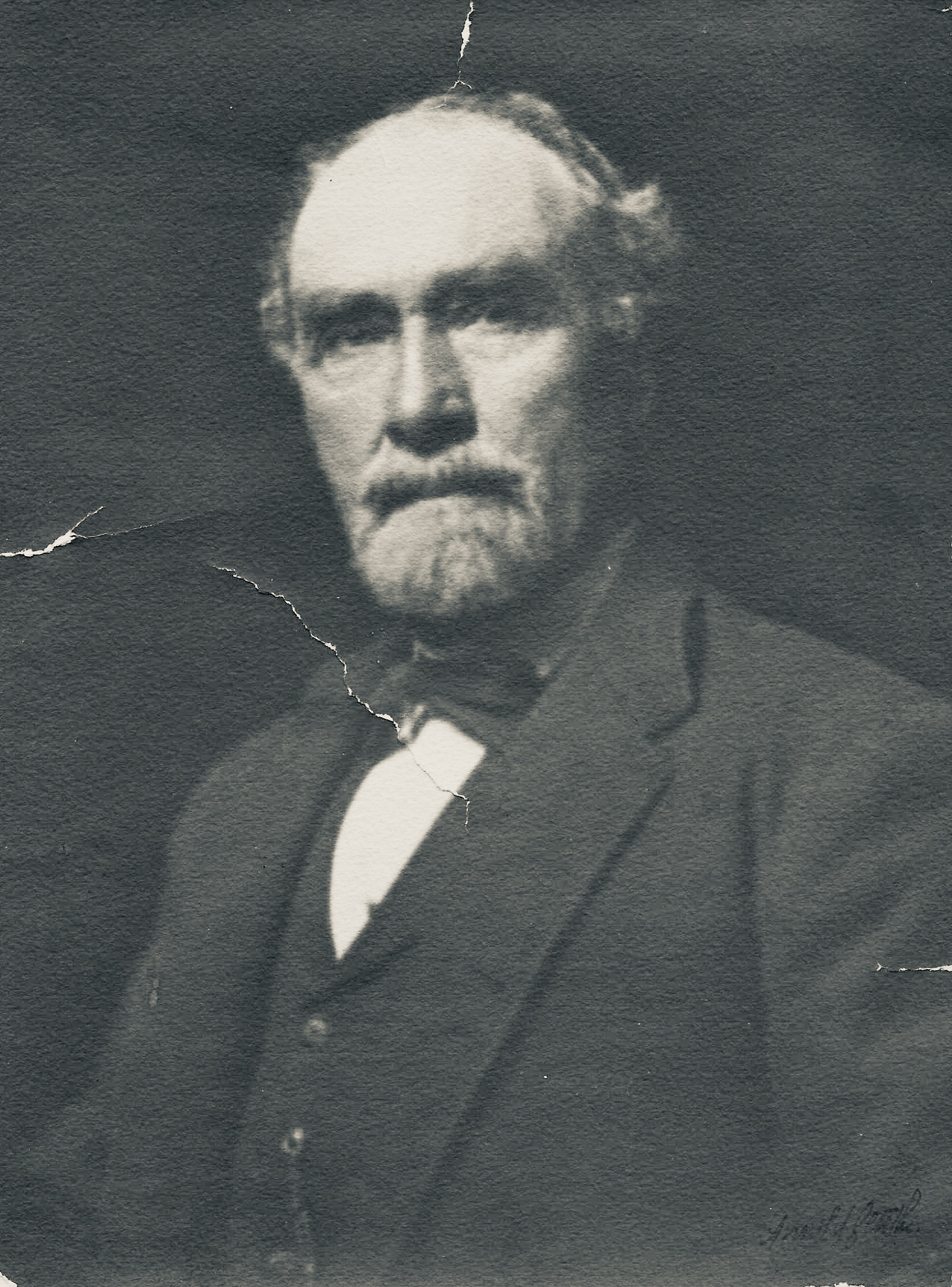
- William Helm ca. 1900
- Born: William Helm; March 9, 1837; Ontario, Canada
- Died: 10 April 1919 (aged 82); Fresno, California
- Occupation: Sheep Farmer
- Spouse: Francis Sawyer Newman
- Children: 7

William Helm (March 9, 1837 – April 10, 1919) was an American sheep farmer and among the early pioneer settlers of Fresno County, California. He was instrumental in the growth and prosperity of the San Joaquin Valley. Helm was vice-president of the Fresno Bank of Central California, and the president of the Fresno Canal and Irrigation Company.

== Early life ==
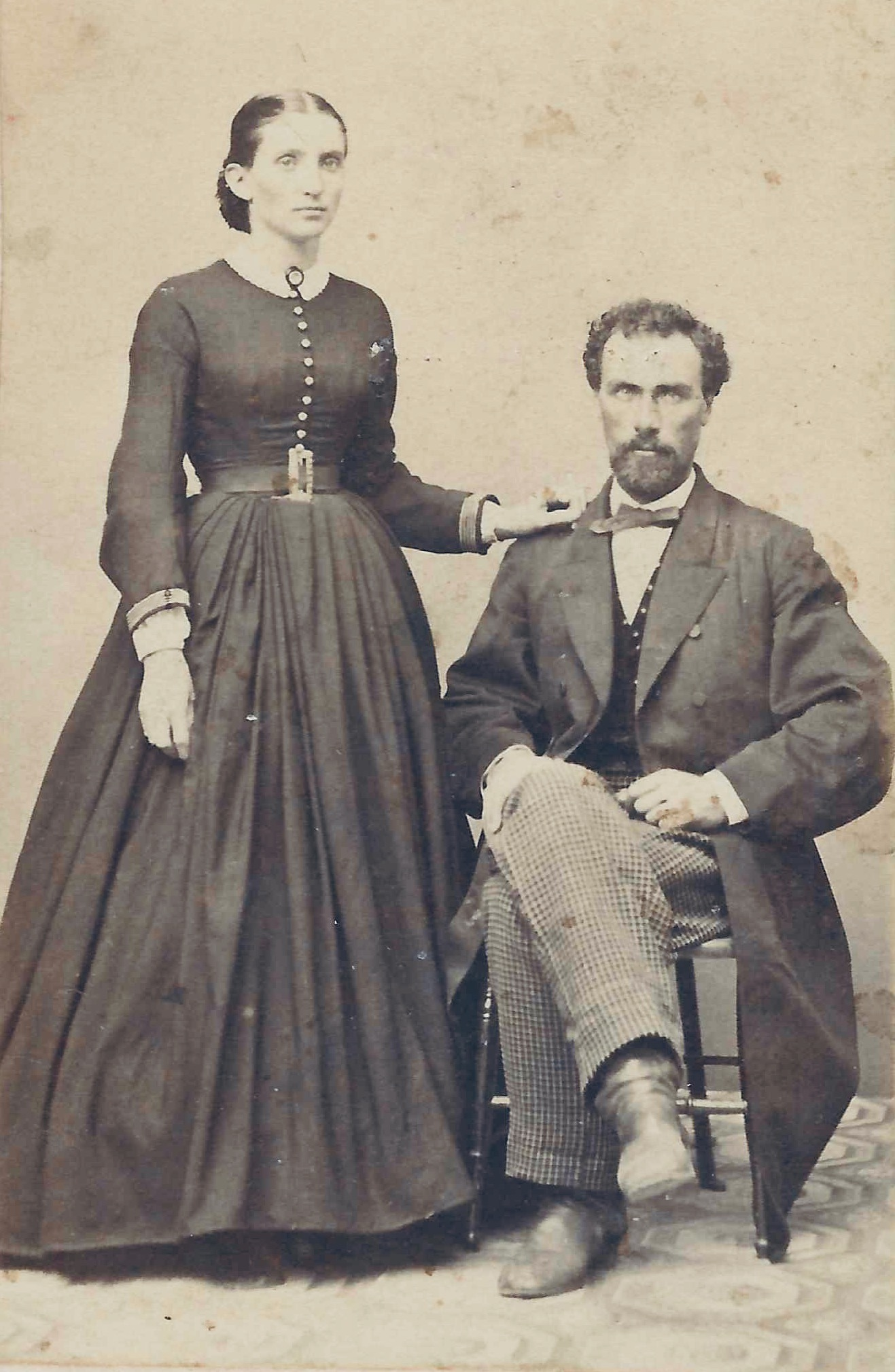
Frances Newman and William Helm about 1869

Helm was born in the province of Ontario, Canada on March 9, 1837, about forty miles above Montreal, on the St. Lawrence River. He is the son of George and Mary (Oliver Helm), both of whom were born in Scotland. Brought up on the home farm, Helm acquired an education in the district schools, and under his father's instruction. Helm left home in 1856 to Wisconsin for three years engaged in lumbering and operating a sawmill on the Chippewa River. In 1859, Helm sailed from New York City to San Francisco, California by way of Panama. He traveled to Sacramento and searched for gold in Placer County but soon found it unprofitable. He spent the next three years as a butcher, first in Foresthill, Todds Valley, and then in Bear river in Placer County. He saved his money and decided to raise sheep for a living. In 1865 he married Francis Sawyer Newman, and they had seven children together.

== Fresno, California ==
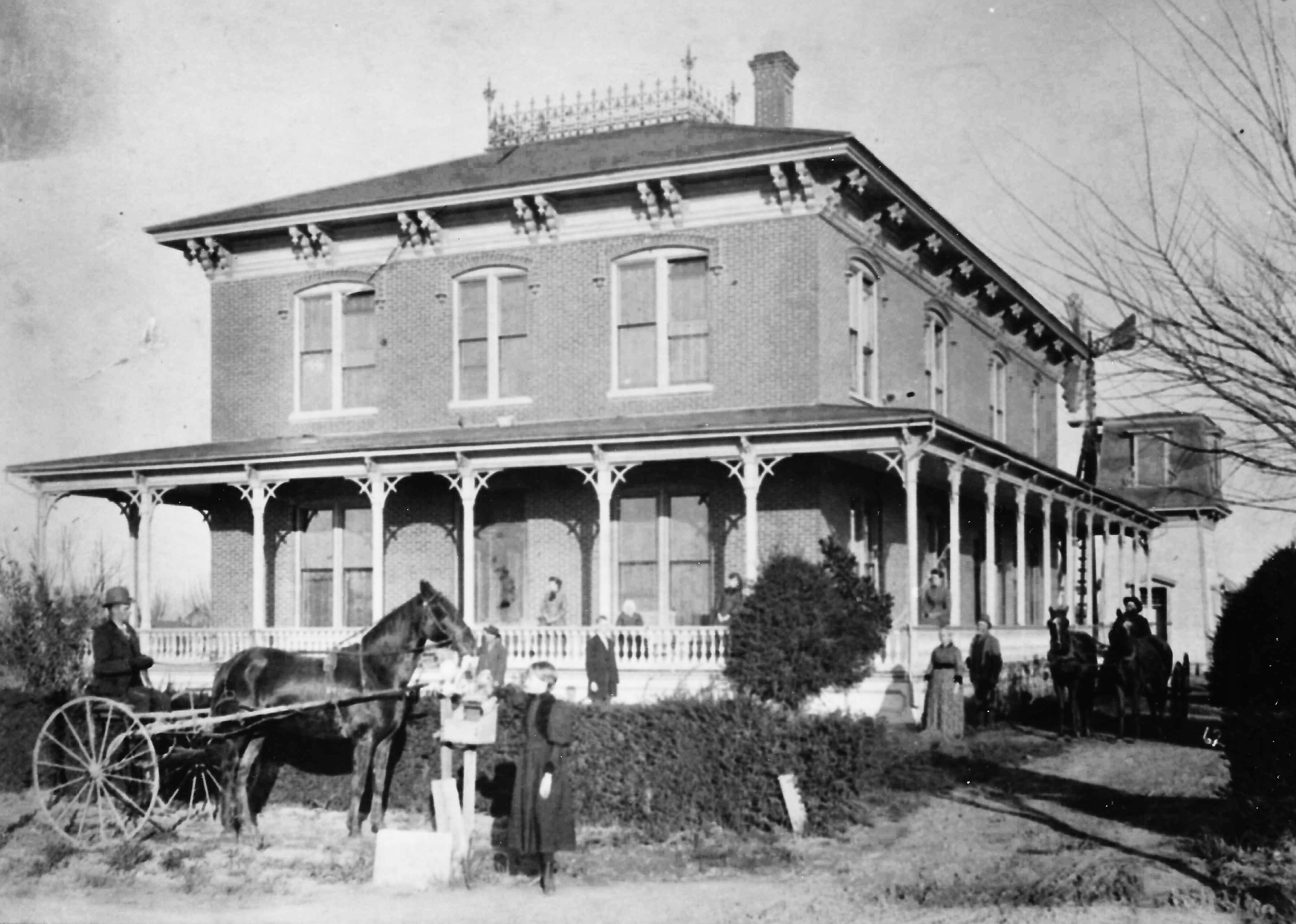
William Helm House

Helm brought his wife and his sheep to Fresno county, which was then a vast space of open land, before the railroad came through the valley. He was one of the earliest settlers to experiment with growing wheat.

Helm was the largest individual sheep grower in Fresno County. In carrying his wool to market at Stockton, he used three wagons, each drawn by ten mules, and spent twelve days in making the round trip. When the railroad came through the valley in 1872, it was a great benefit to Helm.

At Dry Creek, on section four, Helm bought a ranch six miles northeast of Fresno. He acquired up to 2,640 acres, paying one dollar an acre. He bought additional land to establish a winter camp for his sheep on the present site of the Fresno court house. His herd increased rapidly, at one time owning 22,000 head of sheep.

In 1881, because of a growing family, Helm bought the block bounded by Fresno, R, Merced and S Streets from Louis Einstein. He built his home there in 1881 where it stood for 71 years. As their daughters married, Helm gave them parts of the block on which to build their homes. The Fresno Community Hospital was built on this block in 1959.

== Death ==
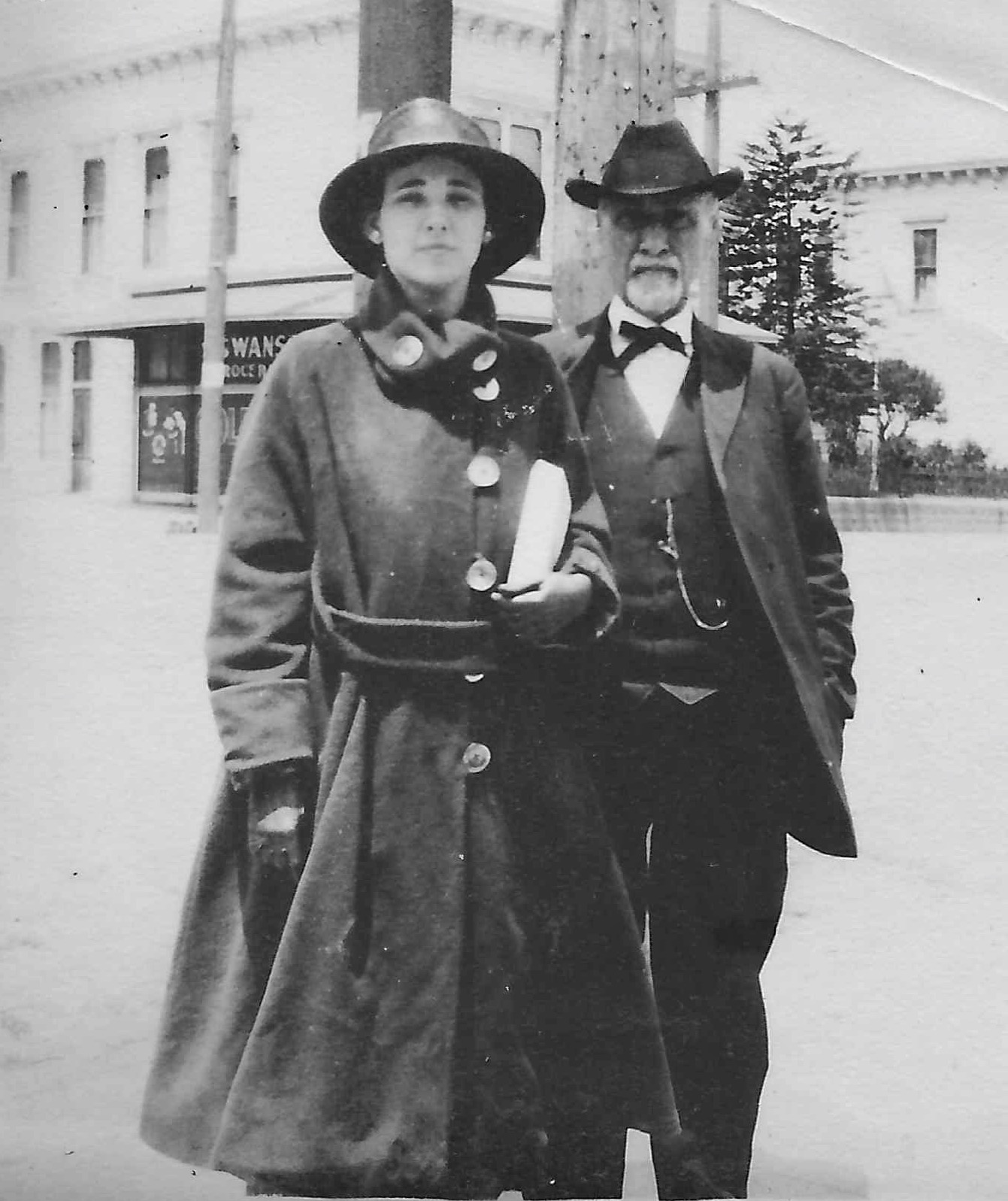
Agnes Jean Helm with her grandfather William Helm

Helm died on April 10, 1919, at the age of 82, following a lingering illness of seven months. He died at the home of his daughter, Jessie Marie Helm.

Helm, California was named after William Helm.

== See also ==
- Timeline of Fresno, California
