= Helm, Kentucky =

Unincorporated community in Kentucky, United States

Helm
- Unincorporated community
- Location within the state of Kentucky Helm (the United States)
- Coordinates: 36°53′44″N 85°9′10″W
- Country: United States
- State: Kentucky
- County: Russell
- Elevation: 574 ft (175 m)
- Time zone: UTC-6 (Central (CST))
  - Summer (DST): UTC-5 (EDT)
- GNIS feature ID: 508220

Helm is an unincorporated community located in Russell County, Kentucky, United States.
