= Nellie Lathrop Helm =

American author

- Born: October 1, 1859; Indiana
- Died: July 12, 1940 (aged 80); Los Angeles

Nellie Lathrop Helm (October 1, 1859 – July 12, 1940) was an American writer. A River Journey was reviewed in The Elementary School Teacher.
