= Senator Helm =

Senator Helm may refer to:

- John L. Helm (1802–1867), Kentucky State Senate
- Joseph Helm (1848–1915), Colorado State Senate

== See also ==
- Jesse Helms (1921–2008), U.S. Senator from North Carolina
