= Theodor Helm =

Austrian music critic and writer

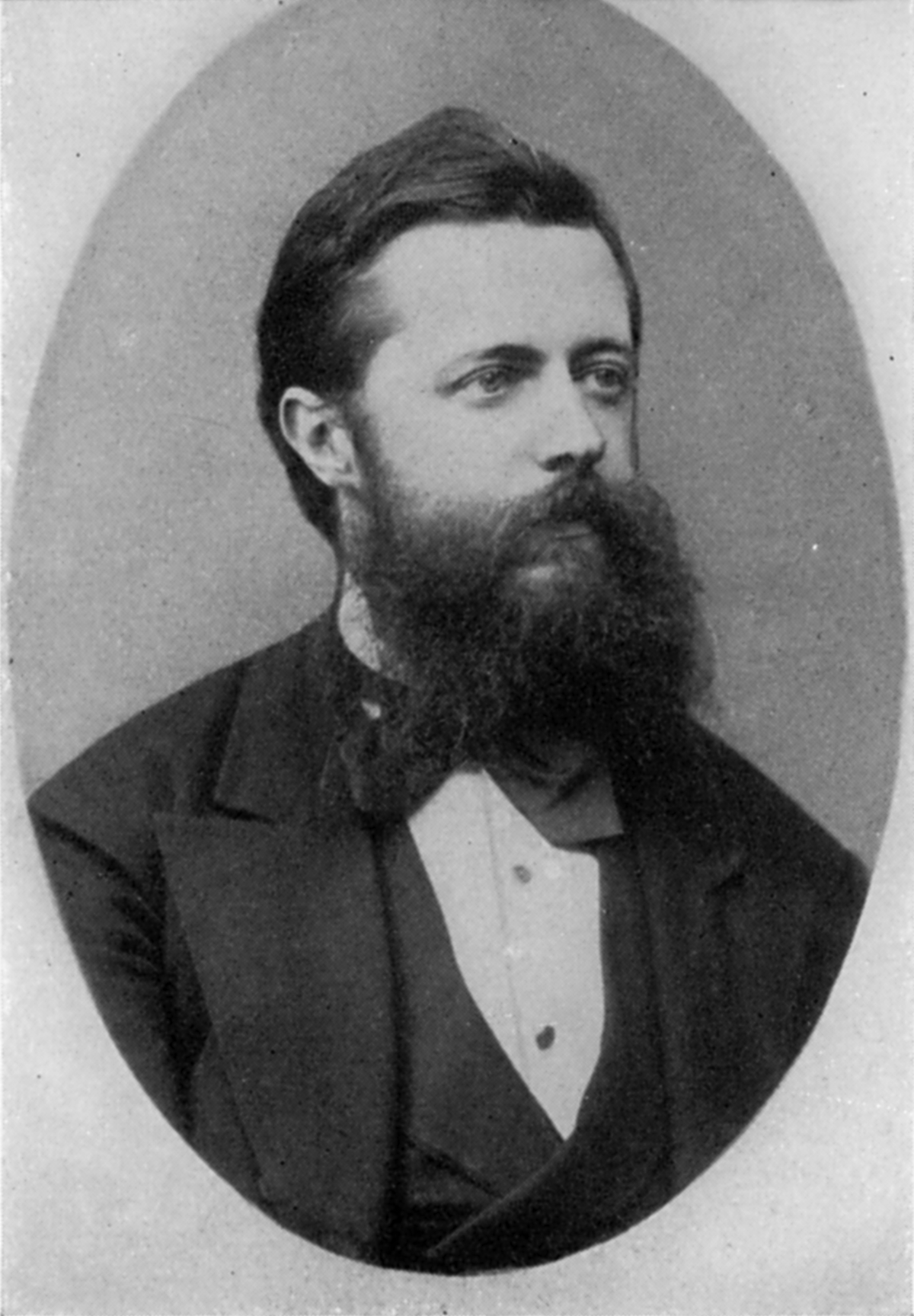
Theodor Otto Helm, c. 1885

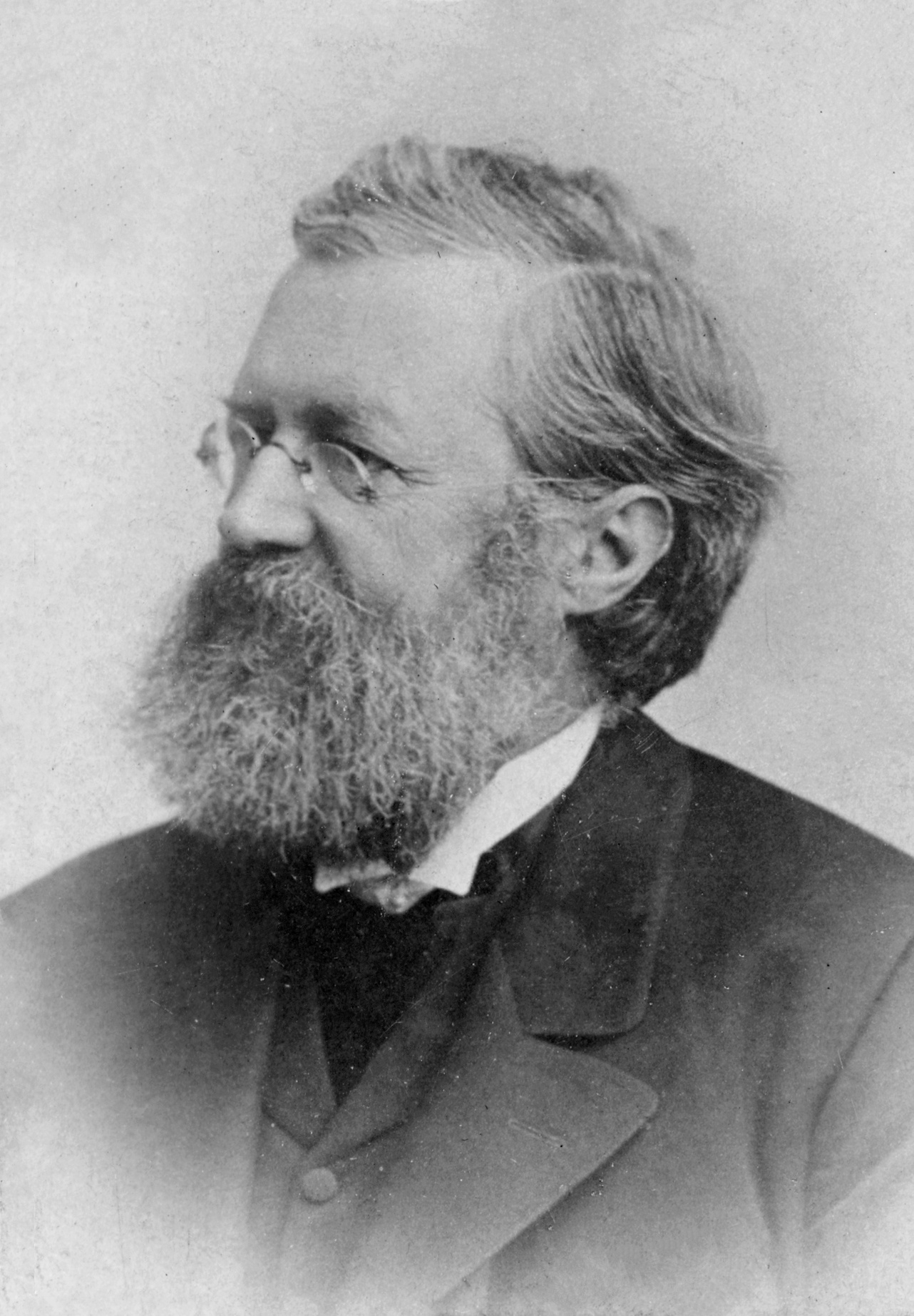
Theodor Otto Helm, c. 1899

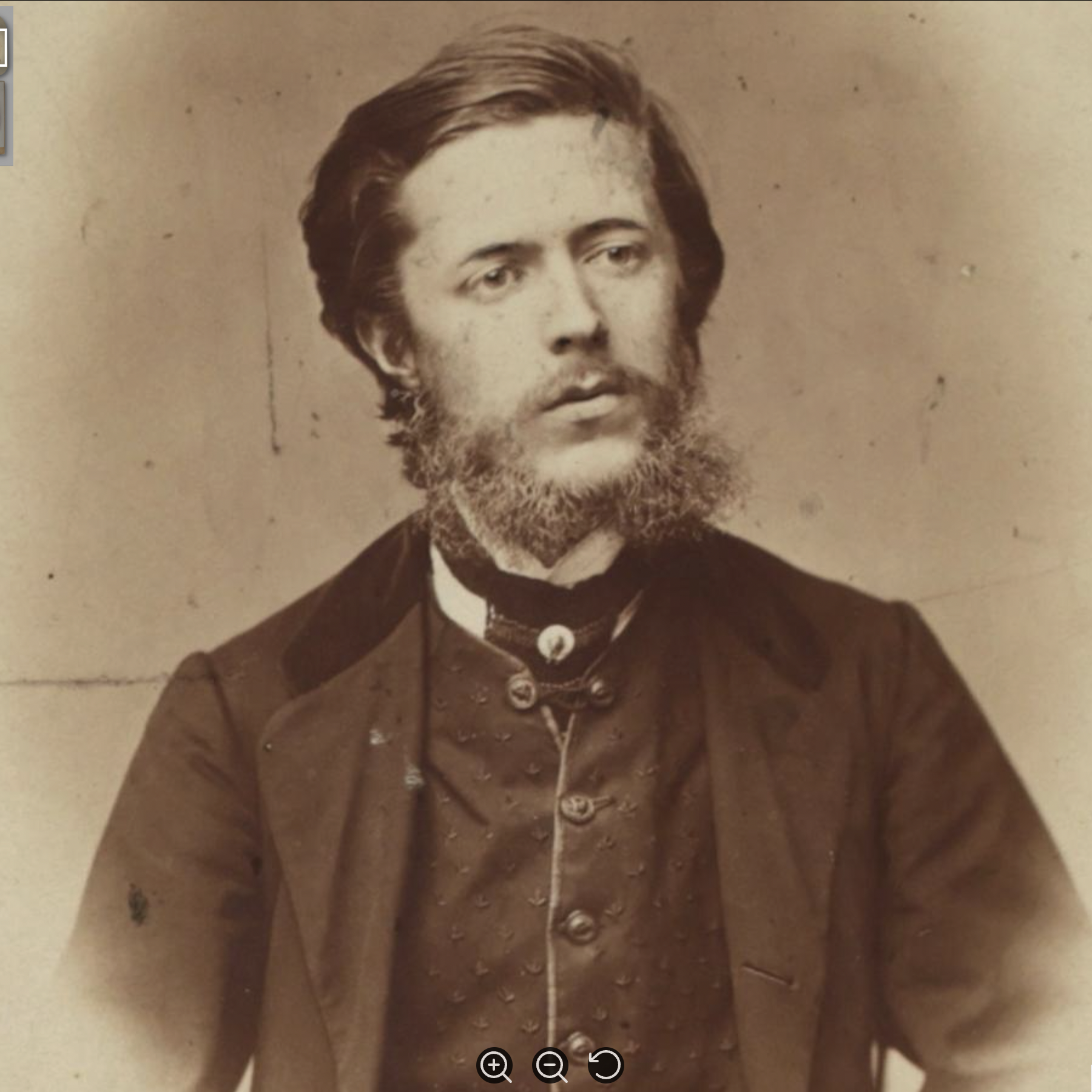
Theodor Otto Helm c. 1864

Theodor Otto Helm (9 April 1843 – 25 December 1920) was an Austrian music critic and writer.

Theodor Otto Helm was a leading figure in Viennese musical life and a prominent music critic in Vienna for fifty years (1866–1916). While Helm specialized in criticism of the works of Ludwig van Beethoven, Anton Bruckner, Johannes Brahms, Richard Wagner, Franz Liszt, and Antonín Dvořák, he also wrote on younger composers including Béla Bartók, Gustav Mahler, Richard Strauss, and Arnold Schoenberg. Heavily involved in the Vienna music scene, including the Wiener Akademischer Wagner Verein, Helm counted both Bruckner and Brahms as close acquaintances.

== Biography ==
In 1853 Helm began his studies at the Benedictine Schottengymnasium in Vienna. He eventually focused his efforts on studying law. Helm received his PhD in 1870. He taught as an instructor of the history of music and aesthetics at the conservatory of Eduard Horak since beginning in 1874. In 1900 he was named professor.

Helm began his writing career in Vienna's Neues Fremdenblatt in 1867. He continued his essays and music criticisms in Musikalisches Wochenblatt, a Leipzig weekly, (1870–1905) and continued with the paper when subsumed by the Neue Zeitschrift für Musik.

Helm's greatest work is arguably his 1885 Beethovens Streichquartette: Versuch einer technischen Analyse dieser Werke im Zusammenhange mit ihren geistigen Gehalt (Leipzig, 1885). This analysis of Beethoven's string quartets is considered seminal work and has been reprinted many times by publishers across the world.

He contributed freelance writings to Pester Lloyd (a German newspaper issued in Budapest) and the Viennese Salonblatt and the Deutsche Zeitung (1884–1901)

While initially critical of Bruckner's work, in 1883 Helm converted in his views and became one of Bruckner's strongest advocates, penning dozens of glowing reviews throughout the rest of Bruckner's life. Bruckner and Helm regularly corresponded between 1883 until Bruckner's death in 1896. Often Bruckner was seeking a favorable review from Helm in Deutsche Zeitung, albeit second hand account, of a non-Vienna venue concert. On occasion Bruckner visited Helm at his home at III Rochusgasse 10 in Vienna to visit and go over his symphonic scores with Helm. Bruckner showed appreciation for Helm's appreciation of his work by sending him a case of his favorite wine along with a letter of gratitude.

In 1902 Helm founded a three-year Bruckner Celebration (Akademische Gesangverein), six years after the composer's death. However the well known annual Bruckner festival was not founded until 1929.

Ever the Viennese loyalist, Helm preferred Hans Richter and the lush string section of the Vienna Philharmonic over the "Prussian precision" of the Berlin Philharmonic.

Helm attended the funerals ceremonies of Anton Bruckner (1896), Johannes Brahms (1897), and probably Johann Strauss II (1899), and Hugo Wolf (1903) all in Vienna.

Helm not only appreciated fine composition and performances but also excellent acoustics. After the opening concert in the Golden Hall of the Musikverein (Grosse Musikvereinssaal), Helm commented on the impressive acoustics: "This achievement, is partly a stroke of pure luck (unfortunately acoustics still cannot be precisely forecast or calculated), and on the other hand it is undeniably merited by the excellent architect Hansen..."

== Aesthetic objectivity ==
While many view Helm in the conservative German nationalist camp, he was simultaneously regarded as one of the "most fair-minded and balanced Viennese critics" in Vienna. As Helm approached middle age, the Deutsche Zeitung was still a liberal paper. However, in 1884 as the paper took a decidedly anti-Semitic turn, Helm was hired as the chief music critic for Deutsche Zeitung and attempted to maintain his critical objectivity in his writings against the politics of the editors. Over the subsequent decades, Deutsche Zeitung touted itself as a highly anti-semitic German nationalist newspaper.

Some criticized Helm for writing to pander to the political views of his audience and thus for writing contradictory reviews of a given performance. He was attacked in the press for being a "helmet without a head". Hugo Wolf retaliated to a critical review by calling Helm "an idiot".

Other argued that Helm sought to not let the political bias of the management taint his writings. Helm's political comments seem "to be added almost reluctantly, even gratuitously, as if he were bowing to the wish of management". His criticism of Brahms included comments deriding his liberal supporters more often than Brahms' works which Helm generally held in high regard.

As further evidence of Helm's rejection of German nationalistic bias, Helm collaborated with both the Jewish critic Hirshfeld and Slavic critic Lvovsky

== Personal life ==
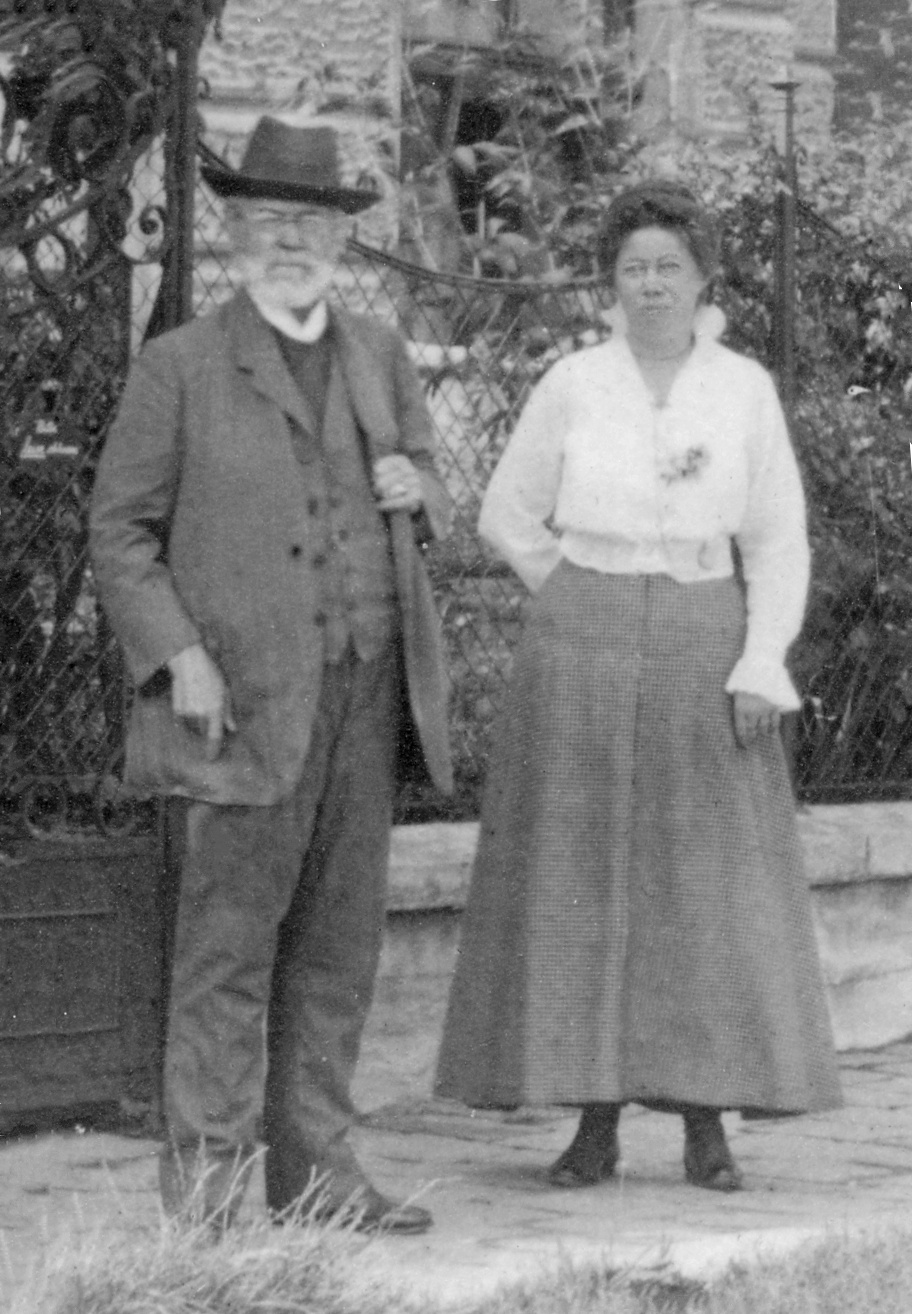
Theodor Helm and Daughter Mathilda in Salzburg, Austria around 1910

Theodor Otto Helm was born on 9 April 1843, in Vienna. His parents Dr. Julius Helm (1813–1844) and Julie Freiin von Forstern had married a year earlier, in 1842. Theodor was their only child. Julius Helm died when Theodor was only one year old. Theodor's mother died when he was 15, leaving Theodor in the care of Julius's uncle, general-auditor Friedrich Drahtschmidt v. Märentheim (1801-1885), who was friends of Robert and Clara Schumann.

While in school, Helm became friends with a classmate Richard Müller whose father was Dr. Karl Müller (1813–1868), director of the Erzherzogliche Gallerie, later renamed the Albertina museum, and a prominent music critic from nobility. The elder Müller was largely responsible for introducing young Theodor to Vienna's musical events and salons. Upon Karl Müller's death, Helm replaced Müller as music critic for the Neues Fremdenblatt.

Helm married Irene Dorothea Müller (1844–1911), Karl Müller's daughter on 1 June 1869.

In 1870 Theodor and Irene Helm had their first child Julius. Tragically, Irene completely lost her hearing in 1870. It is not clear if this was a complication related to childbirth. As a very young boy Julius studied violin under Johannes Brahms, who suspected that Julius was a musical genius. Sadly, Julius died at the early age of five years and nine months.

In 1872 Theodor and Irene had a daughter Gabriela Mathilde Helm. An accomplished pianist, she lived until 1945.

In 1875 Theodor and Irene Helm had a second son Theodor Ludwig Moritz Helm (1875–1963). Theodor Jr. attempted to emulate his father by publishing several critical essays on Anton Bruckner's music, but failing to follow his father's success while under the economic pressures of providing for his growing family, he later settled to work as a civil servant with the Postal Service.

Theodor Otto Helm died of old age on 25 December 1920. He was buried on 27 December 1920 in the Zentralfriedhof in Vienna, near the graves of his fellow critic Eduard Hanslick and the composers Beethoven, Brahms, Schubert, Goldmark, Wolf, Salieri and several members of the Strauss family.

== Writings (selective list) ==
- Beethovens letzte Quartette, Tonhalle, 1868
- Beethovens Streichquartette: Versuch einer technischen Analyse dieser Werke im Zusammenhange mit ihren geistigen Gehalt (Leipzig, 1885, 3/1921/R)
- 50 Jahre Wiener Musikleben, 1916 (autobiographie)
