= George Helm (cricketer) =

English cricketer

George Frederick Helm (11 January 1838 – 31 March 1898) was an English cricketer active from 1860 to 1863 who played for Sussex and Cambridge University. He was born in Worthing and died in Cornwall. He appeared in five first-class matches as a righthanded batsman who bowled left arm medium pace with a roundarm action. He scored 21 runs with a highest score of 11 and took 13 wickets with a best performance of six in one innings. Helm died in his carriage when travelling between Penzance and Marazion.

Helm was educated at Marlborough College and St Catharine's College, Cambridge.
