= Commonplace =

Commonplace may refer to:

- Commonplace (journal), a publication of the American Antiquarian Society
- Commonplace book
- Literary topos, the concept in rhetoric based on "commonplaces" or standard topics
- The everyday life of commoners
- Commonplace (album), a 2004 album by Every Little Thing
