= Tom Helm =

Tom Helm may refer to:

- Tom Helm (conductor) (1952–2023), American conductor
- Tom Helm (cricketer) (born 1994), English cricketer
- Tom Helm (politician) (born 1941), Australian politician
- Tom Helm (rugby) (c.1886–unknown), Scottish rugby union and rugby league footballer
