= John Helm =

John Helm may refer to:

- John L. Helm (1802–1867), former Governor of Kentucky
- John Helm (commentator) (born 1942), English sports commentator

== See also ==
- Jack Helms, American football player
- Jack Helm, American Old West sheriff and Texas State Policeman
