= Laili Helms =

Former Taliban advocate

Laili Helms was the Taliban's best-known advocate in the West before the 9/11 attacks. Following the attacks, The New York Times described Helms, who is married to a nephew of the former CIA director Richard Helms, as the Taliban's "unofficial liaison to the West". Helms argued that the Taliban had restored order and security to Afghanistan, that some reports of their human rights abuses were exaggerated, and that they did not support Osama bin Laden but were constrained in dealing with him by nanawatai and Afghan public opinion. After 9/11 she told reporters that she no longer supported the Taliban and had attempted to privately steer them toward more moderate policies. Helms was not personally religious.

Helms was born in Kabul. Her family was part of Afghanistan's elite; both her grandfathers were ministers in the government of King Mohammad Zahir Shah. When she was a child her family moved to Paris and then, when she was three, to New Jersey. They returned to Kabul when she was nine, and moved back to New Jersey when she was a teenager. She attended Fairleigh Dickinson University, where she studied psychology and communications. In the 1980s she became an activist against the Soviet occupation of Afghanistan, becoming the director of the NGO Friends of Afghanistan at the age of 22. In 1988, she and her husband moved to Peshawar to become aid workers. She visited Afghanistan for the first time since childhood in 1992; she said later that the chaos she saw there led her to support the return of law and order represented by the Taliban.

Helms first met a representative of the Taliban in 1996, at a "conference of rival Afghan groups" organized in Washington by Hank Brown, a former U.S. Senator. During the Taliban's time in power she defended them on television shows like Dateline and helped Taliban officials visit the US and meet with American officials. In one 1999 television appearance she explained that she supported the Taliban despite their atrocities "Because there's nothing else in Afghanistan." After 9/11 she was the target of threats and hate mail. In October 2001 she told a journalist, "I am horrified by what has happened and do not support the Taliban's resistance in handing over the terrorists." Subsequently, she stopped giving interviews.
