= Helm (given name) =

Helm is a masculine given name which may refer to:

- Helm Glöckler (1909–1993), German racing driver
- Helm Roos (1930–1992), South African Army officer
- Helm Spencer (1891–1974), English cricketer
- Helm Stierlin (1926–2021), German psychiatrist
- Helm van Zijl (1909–1992), South African judge
