= Schuberth =

German producer of safety helmets

Schuberth – Logo

Schuberth GmbH is a German producer of safety helmets, combat helmets, protective headgear for Formula One, motorcyclists and industrial workers.

The company is based in Magdeburg, in Saxony-Anhalt and was founded in 1922 in Braunschweig, in Lower Saxony, and has been producing safety helmets for 90 years. Schuberth employs about 300 employees, producing 1.5 million helmets each year. Schuberth produces motorcycle helmets designed specifically for aerodynamic performance. Schuberth first entered Formula One in 2000 using the QF1 helmet worn by Nick Heidfeld, after designing a safer helmet in response to Michael Schumacher's accident at the 1999 British Grand Prix. The helmet, which was lighter than others at the time and featured filters to remove fumes and dust from the air, was taken by more drivers including then World Champion Michael Schumacher, and was gradually developed into the current RF1 model. In 2025, Schuberth's helmets are used by Max Verstappen, Nico Hülkenberg, Isack Hadjar and Yuki Tsunoda. Former drivers that used Schuberth recently includes Sergio Pérez and Daniel Ricciardo. Schuberth designs all current helmets in their own wind tunnel facilities, to enable maximum aerodynamic efficiency. NASCAR drivers Danica Patrick and Jimmie Johnson also use Schuberth helmets, theirs being variations on the designs used for F1 drivers.

Schuberth produces helmets for a variety of industrial purposes, including ballistic protection for soldiers, protection for firefighters and construction workers, producing full face helmets and head protection. The company also produces personal protective equipment, such as facial protection, ear defenders and cold weather equipment.
