= Firebaugh High School =

Firebaugh High School may refer to:

- Firebaugh High School (Firebaugh, California)
- Marco Antonio Firebaugh High School, Lynwood, California
