= Firebaugh High School (Firebaugh, California) =

Location
- 1976 Kyle Morris Dr. Firebaugh, California 93622; United States
- Coordinates: 36.8468°N 120.4464°W

Information
- Type: Public high school
- School district: Firebaugh-Las Deltas Unified School District
- Superintendent: Roy Mendiola
- Principal: Mason Rodman
- Teaching staff: 38.24 (FTE)
- Grades: 9–12
- Enrollment: 632 (2023–2024)
- Student to teacher ratio: 16.53
- Color
- Team name: Eagles
- Rival: Mendota High School
- Website: fhs.fldusd.org

Firebaugh High School is a public high school in Firebaugh, California, United States. It is a part of the Firebaugh-Las Deltas Unified School District.

== Athletics ==
Firebaugh's athletic teams are nicknamed the Eagles and the school's colors are red, white, and blue. Firebaugh teams compete in the following sports:

- Football
- Boys basketball
- Girls basketball
- Girls soccer
- Boys soccer
- Boys wrestling
- Girls wrestling
- Baseball
- Softball
- Cross country
- Boys tennis
- Girls tennis
- Cheerleading
- Track and field
- Boys volleyball
- Girls volleyball

== Notable alumni ==
- Josh Allen (2014), NFL quarterback for Buffalo Bills

== Demographics ==
During the 2018–2019 school year, Firebaugh enrolled 671 students. 643 identified as Hispanic, 23 identified as Caucasian, and three identified as African-American.
