= Firebaugh, California =

City in Fresno County, California, United States

- City
- City of Firebaugh
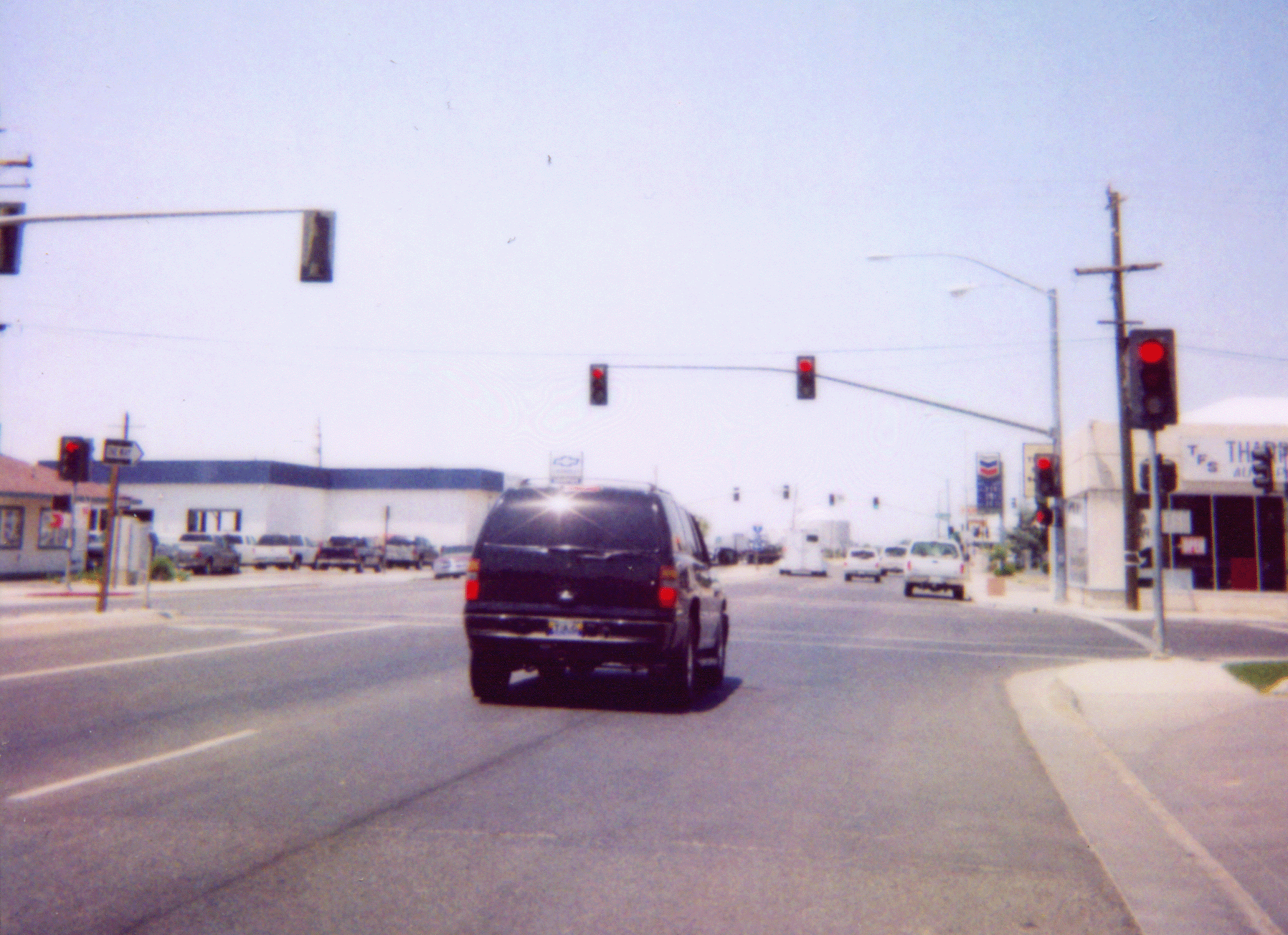
- Northbound N St. (Highway 33) at 13th Street in 2006.

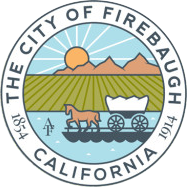
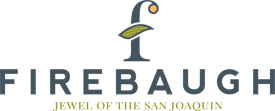
- Seal Wordmark
- Motto: "The Jewel of the San Joaquin!"
- Interactive map of Firebaugh, California
- Location in the United States
- Coordinates: 36°51′32″N 120°27′22″W
- Country: United States
- State: California
- County: Fresno
- Incorporated: September 17, 1914
- Named for: Andrew D. Firebaugh

Government
  - Mayor: Freddy Valdez
  - Mayor Pro Tem: Silvia Renteria
  - State senator: Anna Caballero (D)
  - State assemblyman: Esmeralda Soria (D)
  - Congressman: Adam Gray (D)

Area
  - Total: 3.57 sq mi (9.25 km^{2})
  - Land: 3.52 sq mi (9.11 km^{2})
  - Water: 0.054 sq mi (0.14 km^{2}) 1.55%
- Elevation: 151 ft (46 m)

Population (2020)
  - Total: 8,096
  - Density: 2,300/sq mi (889/km^{2})
- Time zone: UTC-8 (PST)
  - Summer (DST): UTC-7 (PDT)
- ZIP code: 93622
- Area code: 559
- FIPS code: 06-24134
- GNIS feature IDs: 277514, 2410507
- Website: www.firebaugh.org

Firebaugh (FIRE-bah) is a city in Fresno County, California, United States, on the west side of the San Joaquin River, 38 miles (61 km) west of Fresno.

State Route 33 (SR 33) and the San Joaquin Valley Railroad, West Side Subdivision, pass through downtown. A small commercial district features the ubiquitous California Central Valley water tank painted with the city's name.

Firebaugh lies at an elevation of 151 feet (46 m). The population was 8,096 at the 2020 census, up from 7,549 at the 2010 census.

Firebaugh hosts an annual Cantaloupe Round-Up Festival in Dunkle Park. The event aims at celebrating the peak harvest of the melon in late July and is an economic boost for local businesses.

== History ==
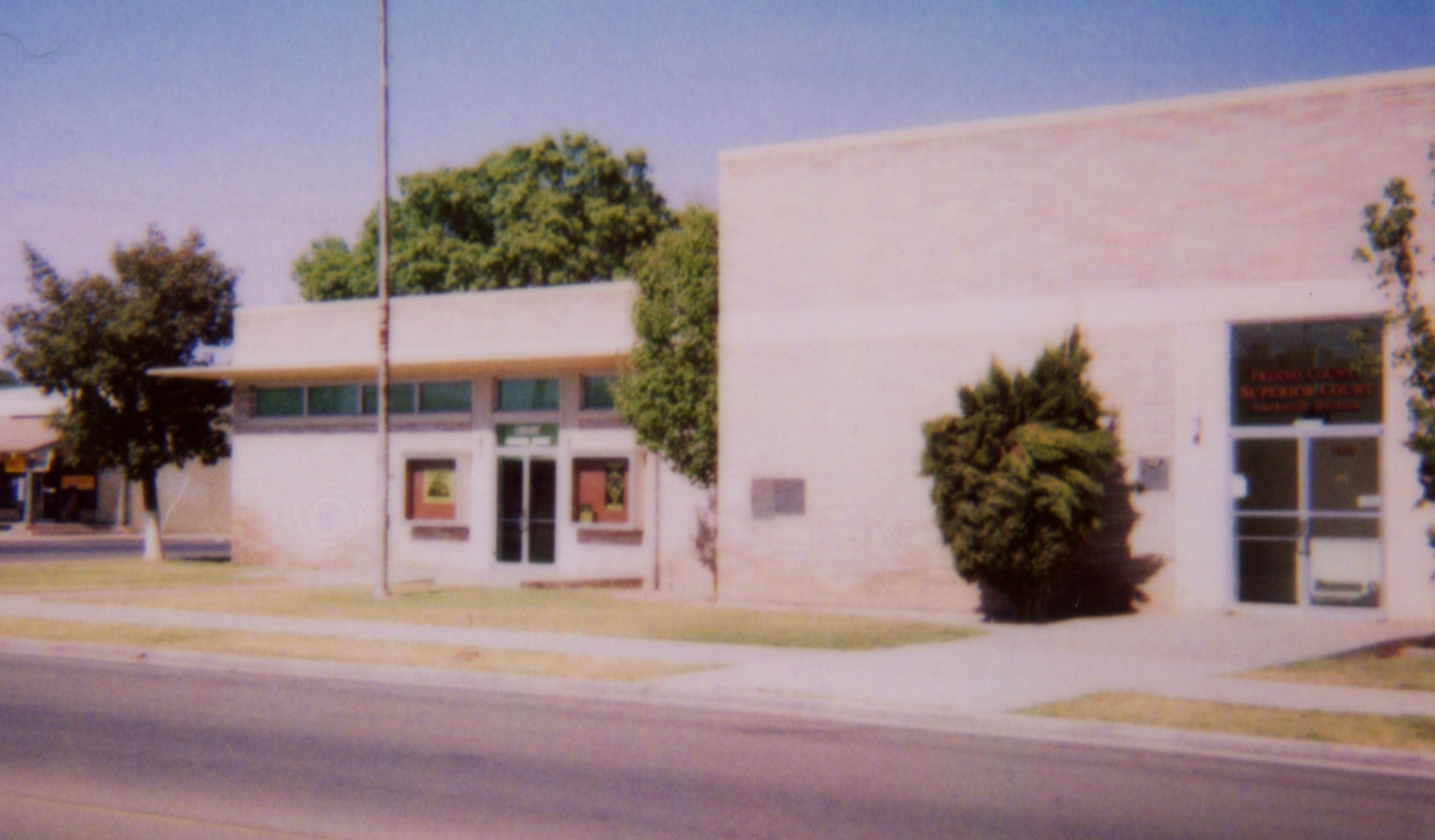
The community library (left) and courthouse (right) in 2006

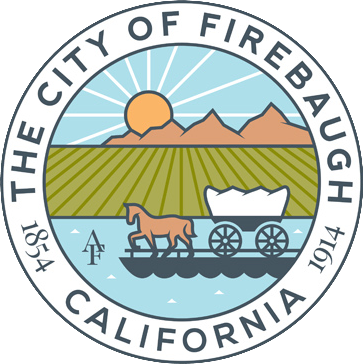
The former city seal of Firebaugh, used from 2015 to 2020.

The city, formerly Firebaugh's Ferry, is named for Andrew D. Firebaugh (also spelled Fierbaugh, born in Virginia in 1823), an area entrepreneur. During the Gold Rush, Firebaugh's most famous local enterprise was a ferry boat which shuttled people across the San Joaquin River. In 1857, he built a toll road for wagons, replacing an earlier horse trail that ran parallel to present-day State Route 152 from what became Bell Station over Pacheco Pass to the Rancho San Luis Gonzaga.

Firebaugh was a station on the Butterfield Overland Stage. The Firebaugh's Ferry post office operated from 1860 to 1862. The Firebaugh post office opened in 1865.

In the 1880s, the area of Firebaugh was once part of the massive holdings of the Miller and Lux Company, which had a large cattle operation covering what today is Dos Palos to Mendota.

The city incorporated in 1914.

== Geography ==
According to the United States Census Bureau, the city has a total area of 3.6 square miles (9.3 km^{2}), of which 3.5 square miles (9.1 km^{2}) is land and 0.06 square miles (0.16 km^{2}) (1.55%) is water.

=== Climate ===
According to the Köppen Climate Classification system, Firebaugh has a semi-arid climate, abbreviated "BSk" on climate maps.

== Demographics ==
Historical population
Census	Pop.	Note	%±
1930	506		—
1940	704		39.1%
1950	821		16.6%
1960	2,070		152.1%
1970	2,517		21.6%
1980	3,740		48.6%
1990	4,429		18.4%
2000	5,743		29.7%
2010	7,549		31.4%
2020	8,096		7.2%
U.S. Decennial Census

=== 2020 census ===
As of the 2020 census, Firebaugh had a population of 8,096. The population density was 2,302.0 inhabitants per square mile (888.8/km^{2}). The median age was 29.6 years. Of residents, 31.5% were under age 18, 11.3% were aged 18 to 24, 25.8% were aged 25 to 44, 22.0% were aged 45 to 64, and 9.4% were age 65 or older. For every 100 females, there were 102.2 males, and for every 100 females age 18 and over, there were 100.0 males age 18 and over.

The census reported that 99.9% of the population lived in households, 0.1% lived in non-institutionalized group quarters, and 0.0% were institutionalized. Firebaugh had 2,122 households, of which 58.2% had children under the age of 18 living in them. Of all households, 56.4% were married-couple households, 7.5% were cohabiting-couple households, 24.0% had a female householder with no spouse or partner present, and 12.0% had a male householder with no spouse or partner present. About 9.6% of households were one person households, and 4.4% had someone living alone who was 65 years of age or older. The average household size was 3.81, and there were 1,839 families (86.7% of all households).

There were 2,225 housing units at an average density of 632.6 units per square mile (244.2 units/km^{2}). Of these units, 2,122 (95.4%) were occupied, and 4.6% were vacant. Of occupied units, 51.3% were owner-occupied and 48.7% were renter-occupied. The homeowner vacancy rate was 0.3% and the rental vacancy rate was 2.4%.

Of Firebaugh residents, 97.9% lived in urban areas and 2.1% lived in rural areas.

Racial composition as of the 2020 census
Race	Number	Percent
White	2,115	26.1%
Black or African American	45	0.6%
American Indian and Alaska Native	98	1.2%
Asian	32	0.4%
Native Hawaiian and Other Pacific Islander	7	0.1%
Some other race	3,222	39.8%
Two or more races	2,577	31.8%
Hispanic or Latino (of any race)	7,486	92.5%

=== Demographic estimates ===
In 2023, the US Census Bureau estimated that 48.2% of the population were foreign-born. Of all people aged 5 or older, 15.3% spoke only English at home, 84.5% spoke Spanish, and, 0.1% spoke Asian or Pacific Islander languages. Of those aged 25 or older, 42.7% were high school graduates and 4.1% had a bachelor's degree.

=== Income and poverty ===
The median household income was $47,594, and the per capita income was $17,182. About 27.0% of families and 31.9% of the population were below the poverty line.

=== 2010 census ===
At the 2010 census Firebaugh had a population of 7,549. The population density was 2,145.2 inhabitants per square mile (828.3/km^{2}). The racial makeup of Firebaugh was 4,715 (62.5%) White, 70 (0.9%) African American, 116 (1.5%) Native American, 40 (0.5%) Asian, 0 (0.0%) Pacific Islander, 2,371 (31.4%) from other races, and 237 (3.1%) from two or more races. Hispanic or Latino of any race were 6,887 persons (91.2%).

The census reported that 7,536 people (99.8% of the population) lived in households, 13 (0.2%) lived in non-institutionalized group quarters, and no one was institutionalized.

There were 1,920 households, 1,208 (62.9%) had children under the age of 18 living in them, 1,179 (61.4%) were opposite-sex married couples living together, 317 (16.5%) had a female householder with no husband present, 182 (9.5%) had a male householder with no wife present. There were 145 (7.6%) unmarried opposite-sex partnerships, and 6 (0.3%) same-sex married couples or partnerships. 197 households (10.3%) were one person and 95 (4.9%) had someone living alone who was 65 or older. The average household size was 3.93. There were 1,678 families (87.4% of households); the average family size was 4.17.

The age distribution was 2,716 people (36.0%) under the age of 18, 914 people (12.1%) aged 18 to 24, 1,923 people (25.5%) aged 25 to 44, 1,504 people (19.9%) aged 45 to 64, and 492 people (6.5%) who were 65 or older. The median age was 26.4 years. For every 100 females, there were 106.3 males. For every 100 females age 18 and over, there were 104.4 males.

There were 2,096 housing units at an average density of 595.6 per square mile (230.0/km^{2}), of which 1,920 were occupied, 1,008 (52.5%) by the owners and 912 (47.5%) by renters. The homeowner vacancy rate was 1.6%; the rental vacancy rate was 3.6%. 4,105 people (54.4% of the population) lived in owner-occupied housing units and 3,431 people (45.4%) lived in rental housing units.

== Education and Government ==
Firebaugh is served by the Firebaugh-Las Deltas Unified School District, which has a preschool, primary school, elementary school, middle school (Firebaugh Middle), and high school (Firebaugh High), in addition to an alternative community education institution called El Puente High School. Firebaugh High School offers the most Regional Occupational Program classes in Fresno County and is also notable for its high AP exam pass rates. Its sports teams are nicknamed the "Eagles".

In the United States House of Representatives, Gustine is in California's 13th congressional district and is represented by Democrat Adam Gray.

== Notable people ==
- Josh Allen (quarterback for the Buffalo Bills, 2024 NFL MVP recipient)
- Traci Des Jardins (world renowned chef and restaurateur)
- Richard Yniguez (actor)

== In popular culture ==
- On their 1985 album Wönderful, the Circle Jerks, an influential Los Angeles–based punk band, recorded a song titled "Firebaugh". The song's lyrics portray a dystopian vision of racial tension, violence, alcoholism, and boredom. Listeners are warned, "If your car breaks down, don't take a tow to Firebaugh..."
- Wells Fargo, one of the major banks in California, periodically runs television commercials set in late 19th-century California and featuring their trademark stage coach. "Firebaugh's Ferry" is sometimes listed as a stagecoach stop.
- The video for the 1999 single "The Greatest" by Kenny Rogers was filmed at the baseball field known as "Dunkle Field" in Firebaugh. Many of the spectators featured in the video were residents from Firebaugh.
- Firebaugh is mentioned in Bruce Springsteen's song "The New Timer", from the album Ghost of Tom Joad, 1995. The song tells the tale of a hobo and itinerant worker during the Great Depression showing a young man how to survive on the road. "I hoed sugar beets outside of Firebaugh, I picked the peaches from the Marysville tree. They bunked us in a barn just like animals. Me and a hundred others just like me."
- Josh Allen, Buffalo Bills quarterback, is originally from Firebaugh. The Allen family owns a farm in the area.
