= Mendota, California =

City in California, United States

- City
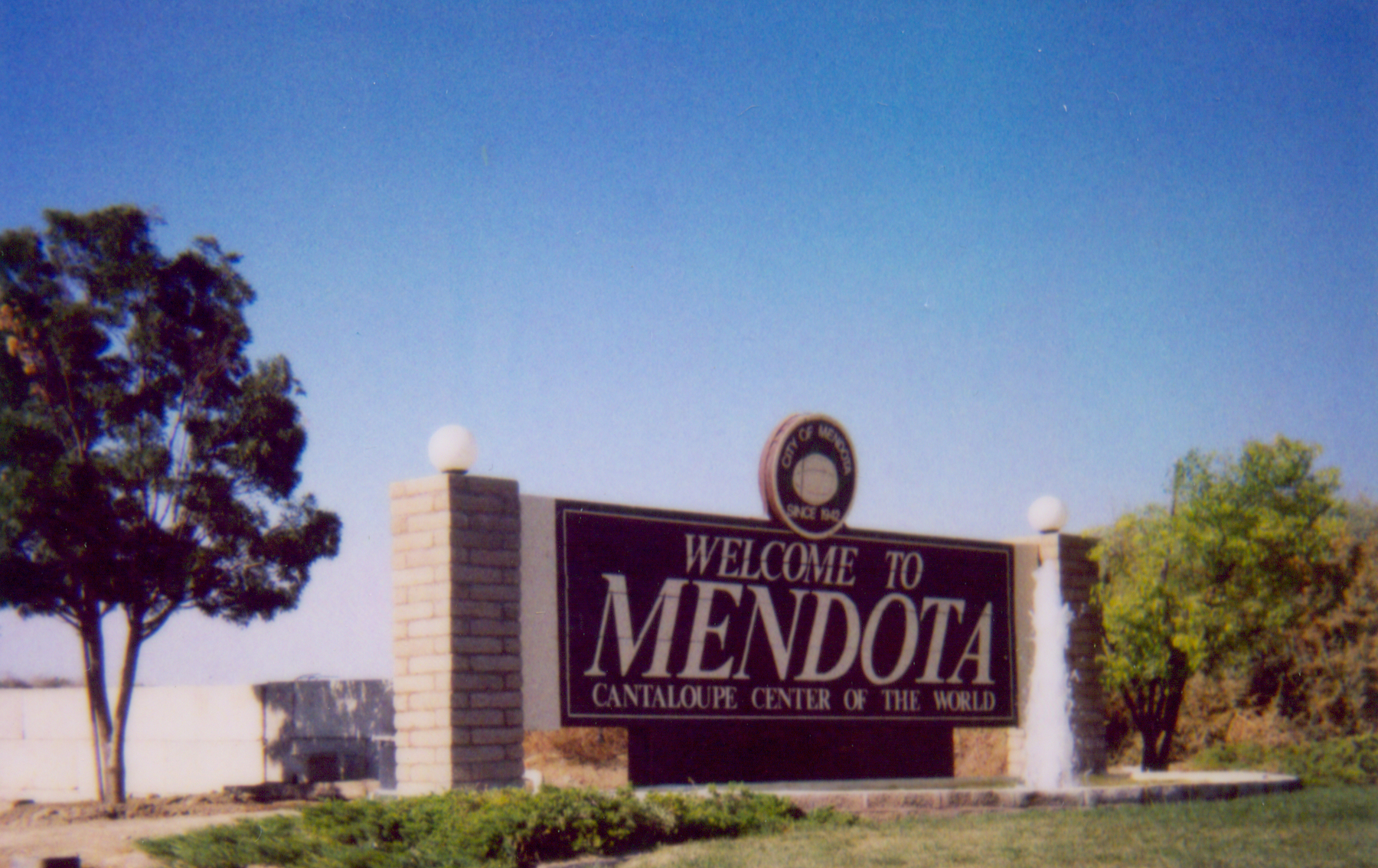
- Welcome sign at south end of Mendota along Highway 180

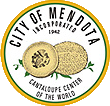
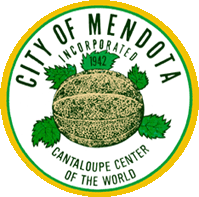
- Current seal Former seal
- Motto: The Cantaloupe Center of the World
- Interactive map of Mendota, California
- Location in the United States Mendota (the United States)
- Coordinates: 36°45′13″N 120°22′54″W
- Country: United States
- State: California
- County: Fresno
- Incorporated: June 17, 1942

Government
  - Mayor: Victor Martinez
  - Mayor Pro Tempore: Jose Alonso
  - State senator: Anna Caballero (D)
  - State assemblyman: Esmeralda Soria (D)
  - Congressman: Adam Gray (D)

Area
  - Total: 3.40 sq mi (8.80 km^{2})
  - Land: 3.39 sq mi (8.79 km^{2})
  - Water: 0.0039 sq mi (0.01 km^{2}) 0.09%
- Elevation: 174 ft (53 m)

Population (2020)
  - Total: 12,595
  - Density: 3,712/sq mi (1,433.2/km^{2})
- Time zone: UTC-8 (Pacific (PST))
  - Summer (DST): UTC-7 (PDT)
- ZIP code: 93640
- Area code: 559
- FIPS code: 06-46828
- GNIS feature IDs: 1656159, 2411078
- Website: www.cityofmendota.com

Mendota is a city in Fresno County, California, United States. The population was 12,595 at the 2020 U.S. Census. State Routes 180 and 33 run through the agricultural city. Mendota is located 8.5 miles (14 km) south-southeast of Firebaugh.

== Geography ==
According to the United States Census Bureau, the city has a total area of 3.4 square miles (8.8 km^{2}), over 99% land. At the 2000 census, according to the United States Census Bureau, the city had a total land area of 1.9 square miles (4.9 km^{2}). It is located next to the San Joaquin River, near where the Delta-Mendota Canal intercepts it to bring extra water to the dry riverbed.

=== Climate ===
According to the Köppen Climate Classification system, Mendota has a semi-arid climate, abbreviated "BSk" on climate maps.

== History ==
Beginning in 1891, Mendota thrived as a Southern Pacific Railroad storage and switching facility site. Southern Pacific management borrowed the name from Mendota, Illinois. The first post office opened in 1892. The city incorporated in 1942, and is mostly recognized for its immense production of cantaloupes. Consequently, the city of Mendota is identified as The Cantaloupe Center of the World. State water projects brought irrigation to the region, setting the stage for the tremendous growth of agriculture.

In 2007 a new Mendota Branch Library opened, part of the San Joaquin Valley Library System.

The city suffers from chronic unemployment averaging 20%. In 2009 a drought combined with a recession caused unemployment to surge above 40%. The unemployment was quoted at 45% in May 2011.

In 2019, USA Today named Mendota the "worst city in America" due to poverty, violent crime rate and high unemployment. However, some residents took issue with the ranking. In response, Mayor Robert Silva noted "the unemployment of 15 percent is distorted because of the seasonal nature of agricultural work".

== Demographics ==
Historical population
Census	Pop.	Note	%±
1950	1,516		—
1960	2,099		38.5%
1970	2,705		28.9%
1980	5,038		86.2%
1990	6,821		35.4%
2000	7,890		15.7%
2010	11,014		39.6%
2020	12,595		14.4%
U.S. Decennial Census

=== 2020 census ===
As of the 2020 census, Mendota had a population of 12,595. The population density was 3,712.1 inhabitants per square mile (1,433.2/km^{2}). The median age was 26.6 years. 35.4% of residents were under the age of 18, 11.9% were aged 18 to 24, 28.2% were aged 25 to 44, 17.9% were aged 45 to 64, and 6.6% were 65 years of age or older. For every 100 females, there were 111.2 males, and for every 100 females age 18 and over, there were 113.9 males.

99.9% of residents lived in urban areas, while 0.1% lived in rural areas. The whole population lived in households. There were 2,832 households, of which 64.7% had children under the age of 18. Of all households, 52.0% were married-couple households, 9.0% were cohabiting couple households, 22.8% had a female householder with no partner present, and 16.1% had a male householder with no partner present. About 8.7% of households were one person, and 3.7% were one person aged 65 or older. The average household size was 4.45. There were 2,471 families (87.3% of all households).

There were 2,875 housing units at an average density of 847.3 units per square mile (327.1 units/km^{2}). Of these, 2,832 (98.5%) were occupied, 44.1% were owner-occupied, and 55.9% were occupied by renters. Of all housing units, 1.5% were vacant. The homeowner vacancy rate was 0.3%, and the rental vacancy rate was 1.2%.

Racial composition as of the 2020 census
Race	Number	Percent
White	2,528	20.1%
Black or African American	29	0.2%
American Indian and Alaska Native	262	2.1%
Asian	29	0.2%
Native Hawaiian and Other Pacific Islander	2	0.0%
Some other race	6,436	51.1%
Two or more races	3,309	26.3%
Hispanic or Latino (of any race)	12,169	96.6%

=== 2023 ACS 5-year estimates ===
In 2023, the US Census Bureau estimated that 47.6% of the population were foreign-born. Of all people aged 5 or older, 12.1% spoke only English at home, 87.6% spoke Spanish, and 0.3% spoke Asian or Pacific Islander languages. Of those aged 25 or older, 39.3% were high school graduates and 4.5% had a bachelor's degree.

The median household income in 2023 was $46,458, and the per capita income was $14,474. About 28.9% of families and 30.3% of the population were below the poverty line.

== Politics and government ==
Mendota has 1,827 registered voters and has the lowest percentage of "decline to state" voters in California, as 7.6% of voters are "decline to state" while 69.1% are registered Democrats and 17.9% are registered Republican.

In the United States House of Representatives, Mendota is in California's 13th congressional district, represented by Democrat Adam Gray as of January 2025.

== Education ==
The Mendota Unified School District, which covers the whole municipality, is the school district serving Mendota.

- Mendota High School
- Mendota Junior High School
- Washington Elementary School
- Mendota Elementary School
- McCabe Elementary School
- Mendota Alternative Education

== Economy ==
Major employers in Mendota include Stamoules Produce, Oro Loma Ranch, Ruby Fresh, and Cardella Ranch and Winery.

Mendota has been known as "The Cantaloupe Center of the World". In 2021, climate change-related drought and high temperatures slowed both cantaloupe production and local population growth.

== Federal Correctional Institution, Mendota ==
As of September 2006, Mendota Federal Correctional Institution, a federal prison, was under construction about 1 mile (1.6 km) south of downtown Mendota. A prominent water tower marks the location. The facility is built on 960 acres (390 ha) of land at a cost of over US$110 million. Completion was scheduled for 2010, but the facility opened in 2012 after several years of funding delays. The facility plan includes a medium security section, housing up to 1,152 adults, and a minimum security satellite camp with a capacity of 128, supervised by a full-time staff of 300 to 350.

== Mendota Wildlife Area ==
In 1956, the State of California purchased 6,100 acres of waterfowl wintering habitat along the San Joaquin River and established the Mendota Wildlife Area. The wildlife preserve is about 1 mile (1.6 km) southeast of downtown Mendota, with the entrance on the south side of CA Route 180.
