= Josh Allen =

American football player (born 1996)

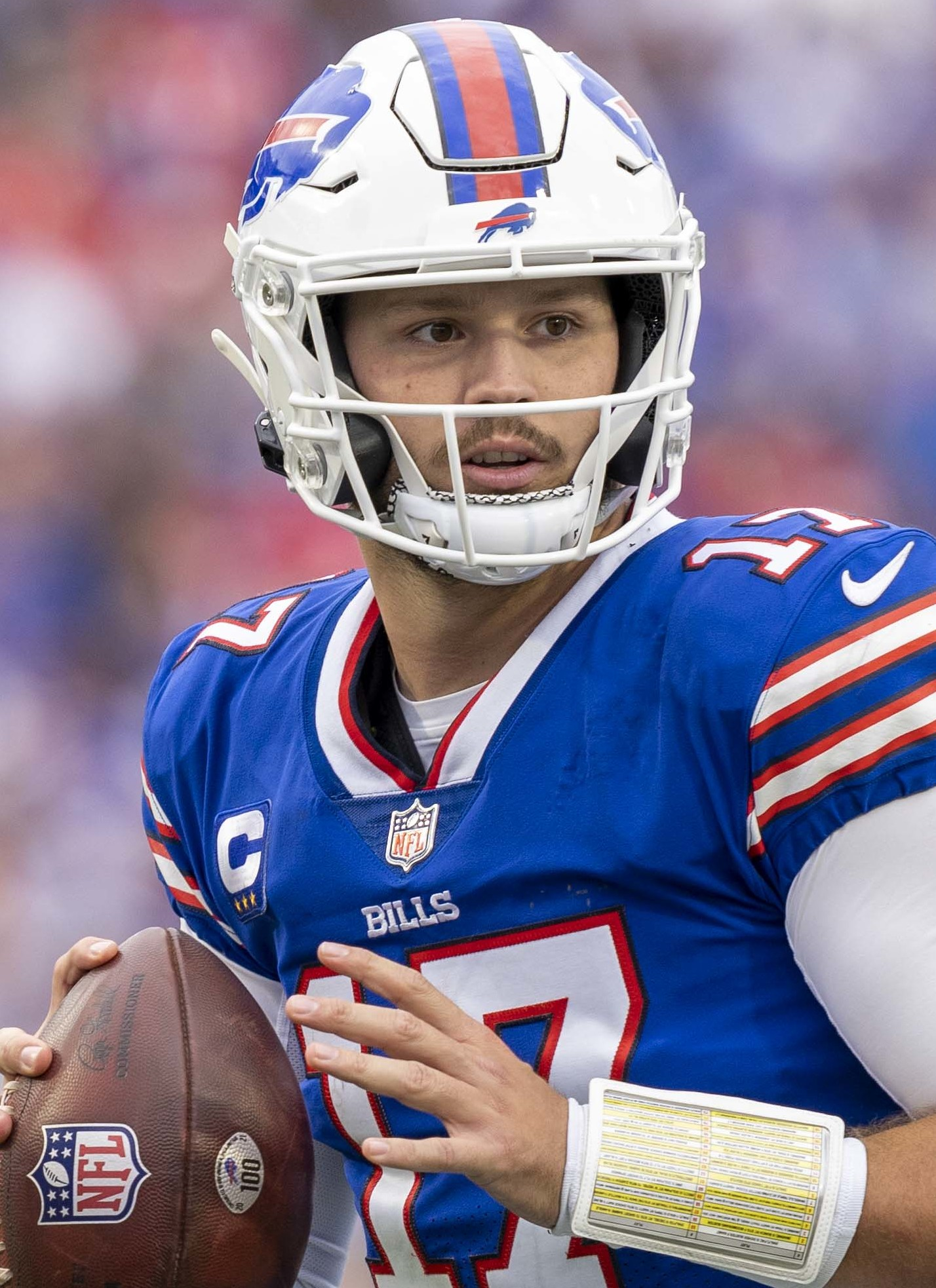
- Allen with the Buffalo Bills in 2021

No. 17 – Buffalo Bills
- Position: Quarterback
- Roster status: Active

Personal information
- Born: May 21, 1996 (age 30); Firebaugh, California, U.S.
- Listed height: 6 ft 5 in (1.96 m)
- Listed weight: 237 lb (108 kg)

Career information
- High school: Firebaugh
- College: Reedley (2014); Wyoming (2015–2017)
- NFL draft: 2018: 1st round, 7th overall pick

Career history
- Buffalo Bills (2018–present)

Awards and highlights
- NFL Most Valuable Player (2024); 2× Second-team All-Pro (2020, 2024); 4× Pro Bowl (2020, 2022, 2024, 2025); Second-team All-MWC (2016); Wyoming Cowboys No. 17 retired; NFL records: Highest passer rating in a single postseason: 149.0 (2021); Most rushing touchdowns by a quarterback in a single season: 15 (2023, tied with Jalen Hurts); Most career rushing touchdowns by a quarterback: 90; Most career postseason rushing yards by a quarterback: 767

Career NFL statistics as of Week 11, 2026
- Passing attempts: 4,390
- Passing completions: 2,809
- Completion percentage: 64.0%
- TD–INT: 234–103
- Passing yards: 32,629
- Passer rating: 94.4
- Rushing yards: 5,011
- Rushing touchdowns: 90
- Stats at Pro Football Reference

Joshua Patrick Allen (born May 21, 1996) is an American professional football quarterback for the Buffalo Bills of the National Football League (NFL). A lightly recruited high school prospect, Allen began his college football career with the Reedley Tigers before transferring to the Wyoming Cowboys. He was selected seventh overall by the Bills in the 2018 NFL draft.

Allen had a breakout season in 2020 when he led the Bills to their first division title and playoff victory since 1995 en route to an AFC Championship Game appearance. As the team's starting quarterback, he has led Buffalo to a total of seven playoff appearances, five consecutive division titles, and two conference championship game berths.

He was named NFL Most Valuable Player in 2024 and has also received four Pro Bowl and two second-team All-Pro selections. He is regarded as one of the greatest dual-threat quarterbacks of all time and is the NFL leader in quarterback rushing touchdowns.

== Early life ==
Allen grew up on a 3,000-acre (1,200 ha) cotton farm near Firebaugh, California, a small town about 40 miles (64 km) west of Fresno. His family has lived in the Firebaugh area since his great-grandfather Arvid Allen, a Swedish immigrant, settled there during the Great Depression. The farm where he was raised was established in 1975 by his paternal grandfather, who was also a longtime member of the local school board and namesake of the gymnasium of Firebaugh High School, from which Allen graduated in 2014.

Growing up as a Fresno State fan who regularly attended both games and football camps, Allen tried to draw the interest of the program's coaching staff; his father tried to sell the Bulldogs' head coach at the time, Tim DeRuyter, on him, but DeRuyter chose not to offer a scholarship. DeRuyter was not alone in this assessment; Allen received no scholarship offers from any NCAA Division I program—whether in the top-level FBS or second-tier FCS. San Diego State made him an offer to walk on, but Allen turned it down because Aztecs coach Rocky Long could not guarantee any playing time. In a 2017 story on Allen, ESPN journalist Mark Schlabach speculated on why Allen got so little interest out of high school:

At the time, Josh was about 6-foot-3 and 180 pounds. He hadn't attended the elite quarterback camps and wasn't a widely known prospect. His high school team didn't participate in many 7-on-7 camps because Josh and many of his teammates were busy playing baseball and other sports. He was the leading scorer on his basketball team and also pitched on the baseball team, reaching 90 mph with his fastball.

Yahoo Sports writer Jeff Eisenberg added in another 2017 story:

At a time when many scholarship-hungry families encourage their kids to specialize in one sport or to transfer to the school that will provide the most exposure, the Allens resisted both trends. They spurned overtures from more prominent Central Valley programs after Allen's breakout junior season and kept him at Firebaugh, living by the family mantra that "you bloom where you're planted."

Through high school, Allen regularly worked on the family farm and at the restaurant his mother operated in Firebaugh. Allen was a member of the National FFA Organization through his local chapter at Firebaugh High School. He received numerous awards for his agricultural work and knowledge including a rank in the top four in the nation in diversified crop production of cantaloupe, cotton, and wheat in 2014.

== College career ==
=== Reedley College ===
Allen attended Reedley College, a junior college where one of the football assistant coaches at the time was married to Allen's cousin.

In his only season with Reedley College, Allen led an offense that averaged 452.2 yards of total offense per game to rank No. 9 among all California junior-college teams in total offense. Reedley averaged 285.3 passing yards per game to rank No. 7 among all California junior colleges, scored 39.4 points per game to rank No. 10 in the state, and averaged 166.9 yards rushing to rank 26th. Individually, Allen's 26 touchdown passes tied him for No. 7 among all California junior-college quarterbacks in 2014. He also ranked 20th among California JUCO quarterbacks in passing yards as a freshman, and ranked 42nd in the state in rushing, averaging 66.0 yards per game.

Allen did not play in the team's first three games in 2014, but in the next game he ran for four touchdowns after coming off the bench, and soon became the team's starter, throwing for 25 touchdowns with only 4 interceptions for the rest of the season. By then, he had grown to 6'5" and 210 pounds (1.96 m, 95 kg), and his coaches at Reedley thought that he would soon receive many FBS scholarship offers. This proved incorrect; near the end of the season, Allen sent a mass email to every head coach, offensive coordinator, defensive coordinator, and quarterback coach in the FBS, but received interest from only a small number of schools. Only Eastern Michigan and Wyoming offered him a scholarship, and Eastern Michigan withdrew its offer when Allen visited Wyoming late in the 2014–15 junior-college signing period.

Wyoming's coaches initially visited Reedley to scout another potential transfer, but former Fresno State assistant Dave Brown, who had since become part of the inaugural staff of new Wyoming Cowboys head coach Craig Bohl, was familiar with Allen, and urged offensive coordinator Brent Vigen to recruit him. While researching Allen, Vigen noticed a large number of parallels between Allen and a quarterback whom he had recruited in 2010 while serving in the same role at North Dakota State—Carson Wentz, who went on to become a starting quarterback for the Philadelphia Eagles. Wentz was similar in size to Allen, and also shared Allen's small-town, multi-sport, and late-blooming background.

Bohl soon warmed to Allen as a prospect, especially after their initial quarterback prospect committed to Syracuse. Bohl was the only FBS head coach to visit the family farm, and while there, he told Allen's father, "We went all around the country and there's only one quarterback we want and that's your son. He's going to be the face of our program." Despite receiving an offer from Wyoming, Allen made one final pitch to Fresno State's staff, sending a pointed email to an assistant referencing the fact that the team had received a commitment from a quarterback prospect who was both shorter and lighter than Allen when Fresno State turned him down in high school. After being rebuffed, he committed to Wyoming, enrolling there prior to the 2015 season.

=== Wyoming ===
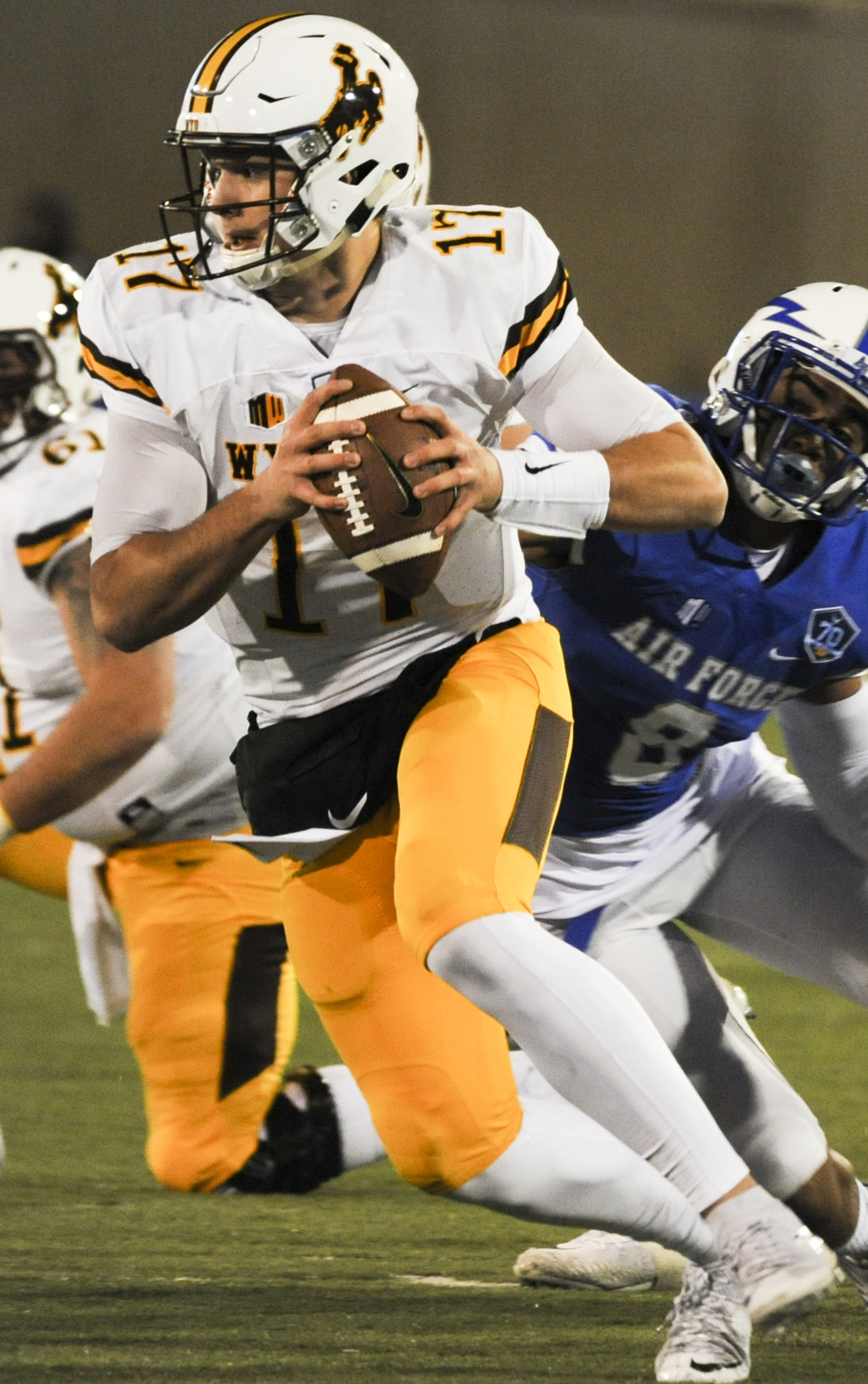
Allen with Wyoming in 2017

In his first year at Wyoming, he played in two games and made one start. In his first career start he attempted only four passes before suffering a broken collarbone which ended his season; because the injury occurred early in the season, he qualified for a medical redshirt. Allen returned from the injury in 2016 and was Wyoming's starter.

After throwing for over 3,200 yards and 28 touchdowns in 2016, he contemplated declaring for the 2017 NFL draft, initially telling his family, girlfriend, and a few friends that he would turn pro. Shortly before the deadline to declare for the draft, Vigen called Allen's father to explain why he should stay at Wyoming an extra year; according to Eisenberg, "When Joel Allen got off the phone and entered his son's room, he found his son riddled with anxiety about his decision." Before the draft declaration deadline, Bohl told Allen that staying in school one more year would improve his long-term NFL prospects, and Allen also sought advice from Wentz, who told him that in the NFL he would have many league veterans depending on him to "win games and help secure their jobs". Allen ultimately remained at Wyoming. He threw for 1,812 yards, 16 touchdowns, and six interceptions in 2017. He graduated with a degree in social science in 2017.

Allen would later be announced as a 2025 inductee into the University of Wyoming Intercollegiate Athletics Hall of Fame for his play as Wyoming's quarterback. In September 2025, it was announced that Wyoming would retire Allen's number 17 jersey, becoming the first player to have their jersey number retired in the program's history. The ceremony occurred on November 22, 2025.

== Professional career ==
=== Pre-draft ===
Shortly after the completion of the 2017 NFL Draft, ESPN reporter Adam Schefter said about Allen's NFL prospects, "There was one personnel director who told me this week that you can put in the books, Josh Allen will be the No. 1 pick in the NFL draft next year." In December 2017, after leading the 8–5 Cowboys to a 37–14 win over Central Michigan in the 2017 Famous Idaho Potato Bowl, Allen announced he would be entering the 2018 NFL draft. In his first mock draft in January 2018, ESPN draft analyst Mel Kiper Jr. predicted that the Cleveland Browns would select Allen over other top quarterbacks in the 2018 draft, such as Josh Rosen, Sam Darnold, Baker Mayfield, and Lamar Jackson. Allen was considered a raw prospect with great physical attributes. Dan Graziano of ESPN.com stated Allen was the "ultimate boom-or-bust NFL draft prospect".

On the day of the draft, old Twitter posts of his in which Allen used racial and homophobic slurs when he was in high school were brought up. He apologized, stating that he was "young and dumb" for making them.

Pre-draft measurables
Height	Weight	Arm length	Hand span	Wingspan	40-yard dash	10-yard split	20-yard split	20-yard shuttle	Three-cone drill	Vertical jump	Broad jump	Wonderlic
6 ft 4 7/8 in (1.95 m)	237 lb (108 kg)	33 1/4 in (0.84 m)	10 1/8 in (0.26 m)	6 ft 6 3/8 in (1.99 m)	4.75 s	1.62 s	2.74 s	4.40 s	6.90 s	33.5 in (0.85 m)	9 ft 11 in (3.02 m)	37
All values are from NFL Combine

=== 2018 season ===
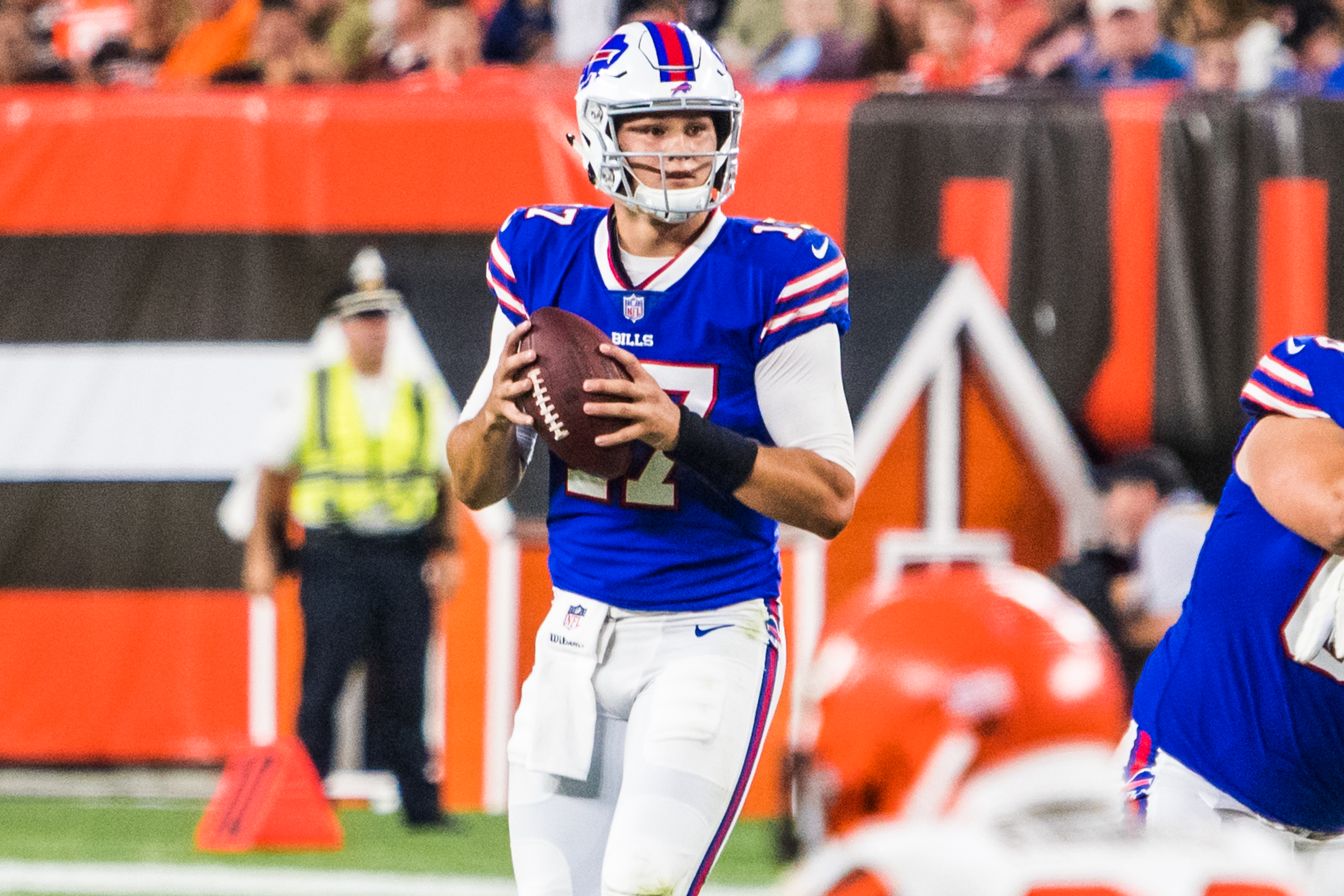
Allen during the 2018 preseason

The Buffalo Bills drafted Allen as the seventh overall pick in the 2018 NFL draft, trading up from 12th overall with the Tampa Bay Buccaneers to make the selection. On July 25, he signed a four-year, fully guaranteed $21 million contract with the Bills. Allen competed for the starting quarterback position with A. J. McCarron and Nathan Peterman through the offseason and training camp. Despite a quality preseason, Allen started the season as the backup to Peterman after McCarron was traded to the Oakland Raiders.

On September 9, 2018, Allen made his first regular season appearance against the Baltimore Ravens after Peterman was benched after posting a 0.0 passer rating. Allen finished with 74 passing yards and 26 rushing yards as the Bills lost 47–3. On September 12, the Bills announced that Allen would start the following week against the Los Angeles Chargers. Allen finished with 245 passing yards, his first NFL passing touchdown, which went to Kelvin Benjamin, and two interceptions as the Bills lost 20–31. He also rushed for 32 yards. Allen's 57-yard completion to Zay Jones, which traveled 64 yards, tied for the second longest air distance ever recorded by NFL Next Gen Stats for a completed pass.

In Week 3, against the Minnesota Vikings, Allen led the Bills to their first victory of the season with a dominant first-half performance. Allen passed for 196 yards and a touchdown, adding 39 yards on the ground with two rushing touchdowns in a 27–6 victory. In particular, he hurdled over Vikings linebacker Anthony Barr on one of his scrambles to pick up a first down, a play that went viral on social media. In Week 5, against the Tennessee Titans, Allen completed 10 of 19 passes for 82 passing yards and an interception in the 13–12 win, adding another rushing touchdown. In Week 6, in a 20–13 loss to the Houston Texans, Allen suffered an elbow injury and did not return. He finished the game completing 10 of 17 passes for 84 passing yards and 20 rushing yards. He was expected to miss at least two games with the injury.

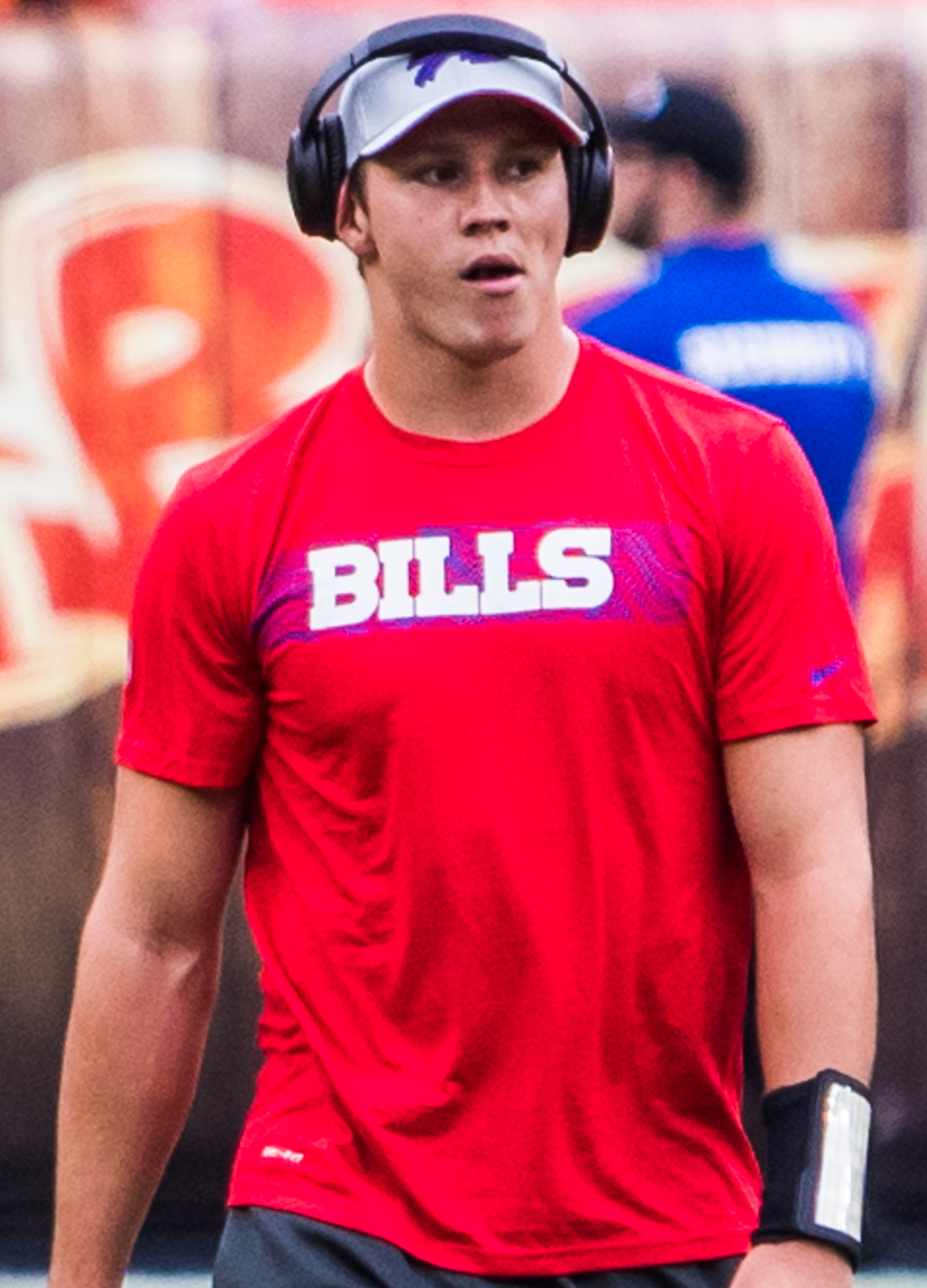
Allen in 2018

Allen returned after missing four games, getting the start against the Jacksonville Jaguars, which was noteworthy as Jaguars cornerback Jalen Ramsey had called Allen "trash" prior to the season. In a back-and-forth game that saw the Bills win 24–21 over the Jaguars, Allen completed 8 of 19 passes for 160 yards and a touchdown, adding 99 yards on the ground and a rushing touchdown on 13 rushes. The 99 rushing yards broke the Bills franchise record for rushing yards in a game by a quarterback, previously held by Tyrod Taylor. Despite a 21–17 loss to the Miami Dolphins the following week, Allen threw for 235 yards and two touchdowns and added 135 yards on the ground (averaging 15.0 yards per pass attempt).

In Week 14 against the New York Jets and fellow rookie quarterback Sam Darnold, Allen finished with 206 passing yards and 2 interceptions, adding a rushing touchdown on 101 rushing yards as the Bills lost a close game 23–27. Allen became the first quarterback in NFL history with at least 95 yards rushing in a three-week span, accumulating 335 yards. After a 24–12 loss to the New England Patriots in Week 16, Allen rebounded in the rematch against the Dolphins in Week 17. Despite throwing his first career pick-six, he scored five total touchdowns, three passing and two rushing, along with 224 passing yards and 95 rushing yards as the Bills routed the Dolphins 42–17. The performance earned him recognition as the American Football Conference (AFC)'s Offensive Player of the Week.

The Bills finished 6–10 on the season, 5–6 with Allen as the starting quarterback. He became the first quarterback in Bills history to lead the team in both passing and rushing in a season. He led all quarterbacks with eight rushing touchdowns on the season, but also had the lowest completion percentage among qualified passers at 52.8.

=== 2019 season ===
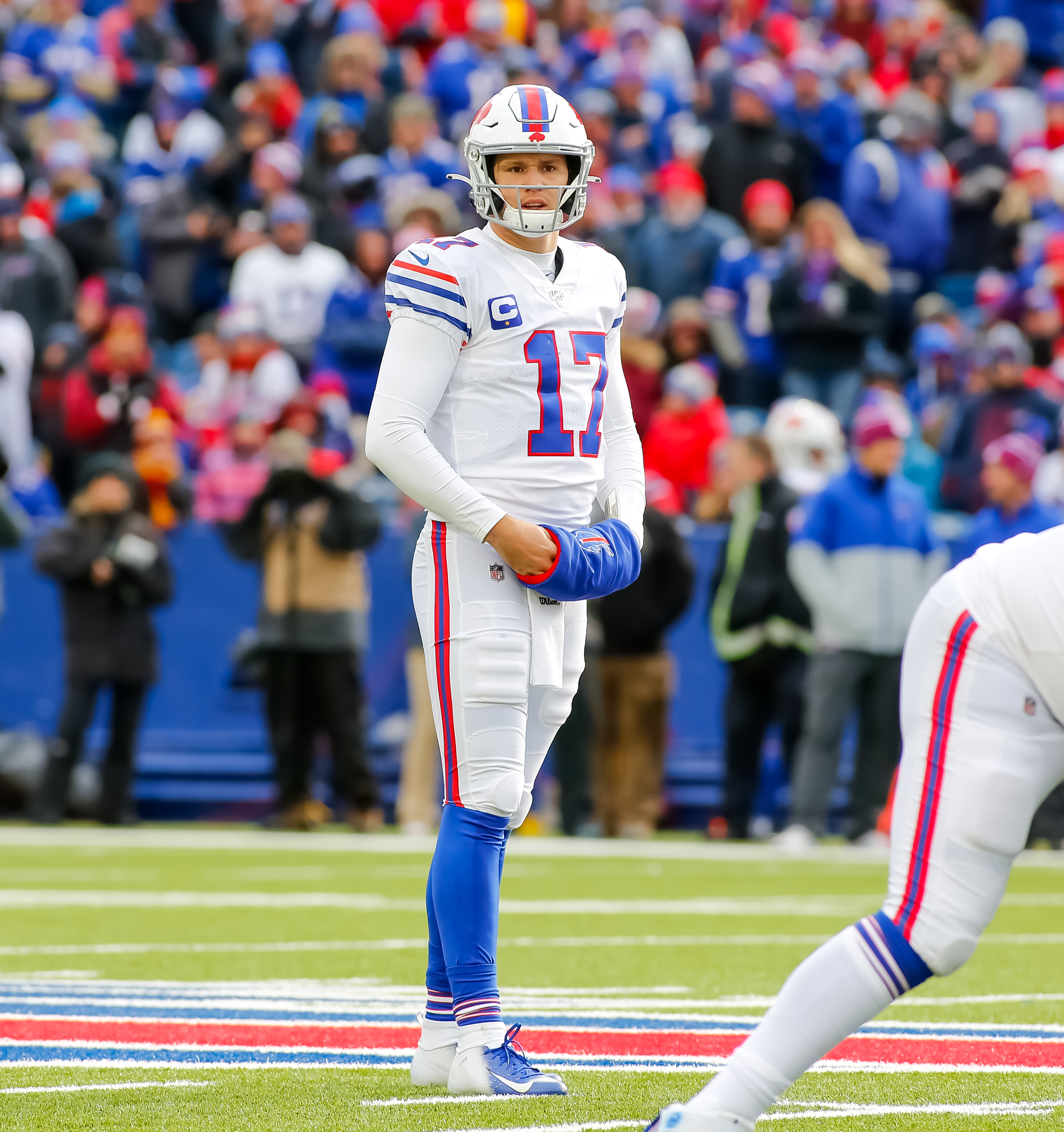
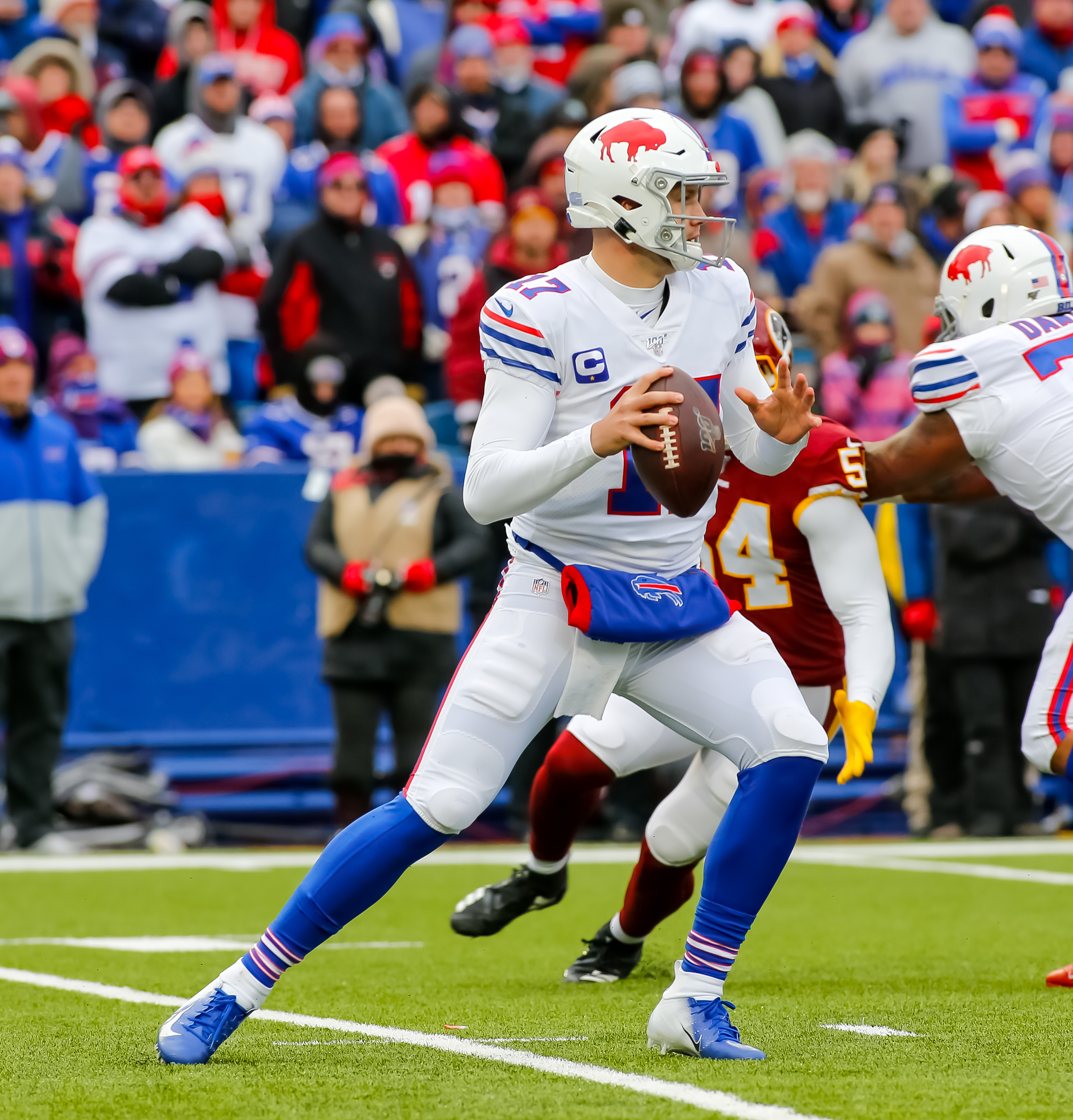
Allen in a game against the Washington Redskins

Allen entered 2019 as the Bills' opening day starter, being named a team captain. In Week 1, Allen led the Bills to a comeback win over the Jets. Despite the Bills being down 16–0 at one point in the third quarter, Allen led the team to 17 unanswered points. He finished the game with 254 passing yards on 24 completions, both career highs. He also had one passing touchdown, one rushing touchdown, and two interceptions.

After leading Buffalo to its first 3–0 start since 2011, Allen struggled against a stout Patriots defense, throwing three interceptions, but became the first player to score an offensive touchdown on the Patriots in the 2019 season. He completed 13 of 28 passes for 153 yards, and also rushed for 26 yards and the aforementioned touchdown before suffering a helmet-to-helmet hit from Patriots cornerback Jonathan Jones, which forced him out of the eventual 16–10 Bills loss.

Despite being placed in the concussion protocol, Allen returned the following week against the Titans, completing 23 of 32 pass attempts for 219 yards, two touchdowns, and one interception in a 14–7 Bills win. In Week 10, against the Browns, Allen completed 22 of 41 passes for 266 yards and ran for 28 yards and two touchdowns, but the Bills lost 19–16 because of two missed field goal attempts.

In Week 11, against the Dolphins, he passed for 256 yards and three touchdowns, matching a career high, and rushed for 56 yards and a touchdown as the Bills won 37–20. He was named AFC Offensive Player of the Week for his performance in Week 11. In Week 13, against the Dallas Cowboys on Thanksgiving, Allen completed 19 of 24 passes for 231 yards and a touchdown with a passer rating of 120.7, also rushing for 43 yards and a touchdown in a 26–15 Bills win.

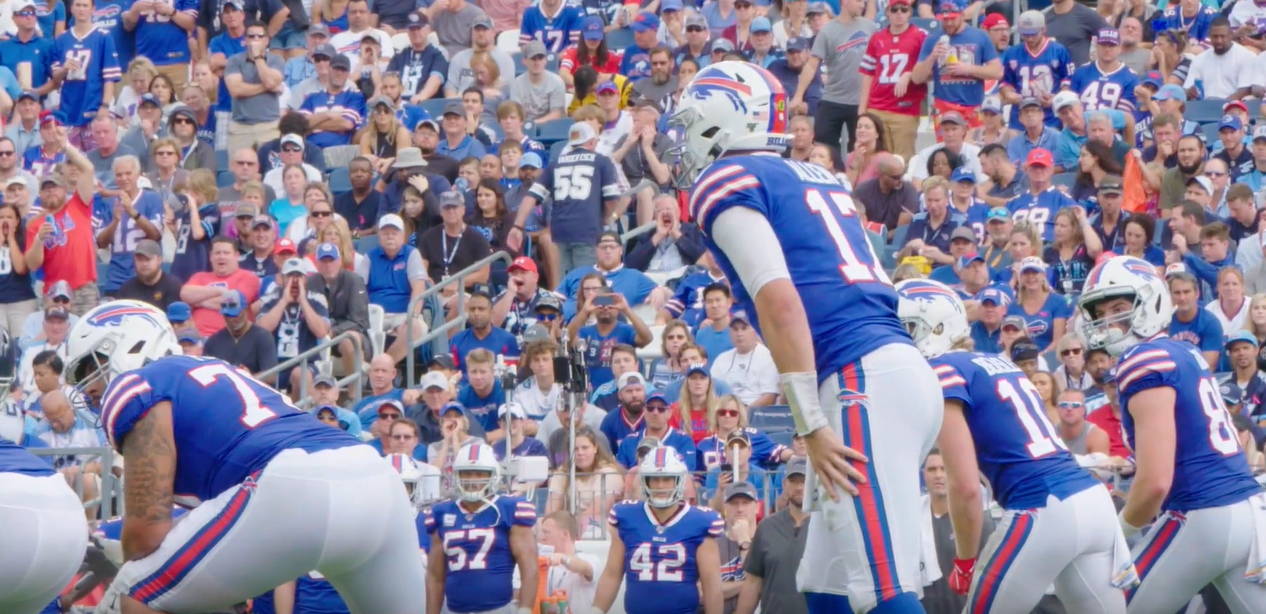
Allen against the Tennessee Titans

In Week 15, against the Pittsburgh Steelers on Sunday Night Football, Allen threw for 139 yards, one touchdown, and one interception and rushed for 28 yards and a touchdown during the 17–10 win. As a result of the win, the Bills clinched a spot in the playoffs. In Week 16, in a rematch against the Patriots, Allen passed for 208 yards and two touchdowns, including a 53-yarder to John Brown, but Buffalo fell short once again, losing 24–17 to surrender the division title to New England.

With playoff seeding locked up, Allen had a limited role in the regular season finale loss to the New York Jets. He finished the 2019 season with 3,089 passing yards, 20 passing touchdowns, and nine interceptions to go along with 109 carries for 510 rushing yards and nine rushing touchdowns, while also leading the league with four fourth quarter comebacks and five game-winning drives. However, he also posted the league's lowest completion percentage among qualified passers for a second consecutive year at 58.8.

==== 2019–20 postseason ====
In the AFC Wild Card Round against the Texans, Allen started strong, breaking Jim Kelly's franchise post-season record for rushing yards by a quarterback (37) with a single 42-yard run on the first drive, and caught a 16-yard touchdown pass from wide receiver John Brown on a trick play, similar to what Nick Foles did in Super Bowl LII. After building a 16–0 lead early in the third quarter, the Bills were unable to keep momentum and ultimately had to come from behind in the final moments to force overtime. Overall, Allen finished with 92 rushing yards, 264 passing yards, 16 receiving yards, and one total touchdown as the Bills lost 19–22 in overtime. Allen was just the third player since 1975 with 250+ pass yards, 40+ rush yards, and 15+ receiving yards in a single game.

=== 2020 season ===
In August 2020, Allen was reportedly among a group of 77 NFL players that tested positive for COVID-19. However, all 77 results were later revealed to have been false positives due to mishandling by the laboratory that performed the testing. Allen remarked that he was frustrated by the error.

Allen started the season strong, attaining his first three games with over 300 yards passing in his professional career with wins over the Jets, Dolphins, and Los Angeles Rams, with a high of 415 yards against Miami and a last-minute comeback win over Los Angeles. He became the first Bills quarterback to throw for 300 yards since Tyrod Taylor recorded 329 yards in Week 16 of the 2016 season, and also became the first Bills quarterback to pass for 300 yards in back-to-back games since Drew Bledsoe in 2002. Through the first two weeks, Allen joined Peyton Manning (2013), Tom Brady (2015), and Patrick Mahomes (2019) as the only four quarterbacks in NFL history with at least 700 yards passing, six touchdowns, and no interceptions through the first two weeks of a season. After Week 3, he became the first quarterback in Bills' history with at least 300 pass yards and three touchdowns in three consecutive weeks and surpassed Jim Kelly's franchise record for most passing touchdowns in the team's first three games with ten. On October 1, 2020, Allen was named the AFC Offensive Player of the Month for his performance in September.

In Week 4, Allen won against the Las Vegas Raiders by a score of 30–23, throwing for 288 yards and two touchdowns, with another rushing touchdown. He led the Bills to their first 4–0 record since 2008. The following week, Allen and the Bills played the Titans on Tuesday, October 13, with the game having been delayed due to a COVID-19 outbreak in the Titans' organization. This was just the second Tuesday night football game in 70 years. The Bills lost 42–16. Allen finished the game with 26 completions on 41 attempts, passing for 263 yards, two touchdowns, and two interceptions.

In Week 8, Allen led the Bills to a 24–21 victory over the Patriots, Buffalo's first home win against the Patriots since 2011 and Allen's first career win against the Patriots. The following week, he would become the first quarterback in the Super Bowl era with at least 400 passing yards, three passing touchdowns, zero interceptions and a passer rating of 130 in multiple games in a single season during Buffalo's 44–34 upset victory over the heavily favored Seattle Seahawks. Allen completed 31 of 38 (81.6 completion percentage) passes for 415 yards and three passing touchdowns, adding 14 yards and another touchdown on the ground. The Bills improved to 7–2 on the year for the first time since 1993. After the game, it was revealed by Bills head coach Sean McDermott that Allen had played one day after the death of his grandmother.

In Week 10, the Bills traveled west to play the Arizona Cardinals. In a shootout match, Allen completed 32 of 49 passes for 284 yards, 2 touchdowns, and 2 interceptions. He also rushed for 38 yards on 7 carries and caught a 12-yard touchdown pass from Isaiah McKenzie on a trick play. Allen's second touchdown pass to Stefon Diggs put the Bills up 30–26 with only 34 seconds left in the game, but the Bills lost after Cardinals quarterback Kyler Murray completed a Hail Mary pass to DeAndre Hopkins with just two seconds left. After the bye week, Allen had a quiet but effective game during a 27–17 Week 12 win over the Chargers, completing 18 of 24 passes for 157 yards, one touchdown, and one interception, in addition to 32 rushing yards, one rushing touchdown, and one fumble. Allen had another strong game the following week on Monday Night Football against the San Francisco 49ers, completing 32 of 40 attempts for 375 passing yards and four passing touchdowns in the 34–24 victory, also becoming the first quarterback in Buffalo's history to attempt 40 or more passes in a single game while completing at least 80% of his passes and joined Drew Brees as the only two quarterbacks in league history to have three games of 375 passing yards, 3+ passing touchdowns and a 130+ passer rating in a single season.

Allen broke Jim Kelly's franchise record for the most total touchdowns by a single player during a Week 14 win over the Steelers on Sunday Night Football after passing for two touchdowns during the game. He finished the game with 238 yards, the two touchdowns, and an interception. The following week against the Denver Broncos, Allen helped the Bills clinch their first AFC East division title since 1995, six months before he was born. He finished the game with 359 yards passing and two passing touchdowns, in addition to 33 yards rushing and two scores on the ground, during the 48–19 Bills win. During a Week 16 rematch with the Patriots on Monday Night Football, Allen completed 27 of 36 attempts for 320 passing yards and 4 touchdowns, surpassing Kelly's franchise record for single-season passing touchdowns. By helping Buffalo win 38–9, Allen also allowed the Bills to sweep the Patriots for the first time since 1999. Allen was named the AFC Offensive Player of the Month for his performance in December. Overall, Allen finished the 2020 season with 4,544 passing yards, 37 passing touchdowns, and ten interceptions to go along with 102 carries for 421 rushing yards and eight rushing touchdowns. He also significantly improved his completion percentage from being the lowest in his previous seasons to fourth overall at 69.2.

Throughout the season, Allen was named the AFC Offensive Player of the Week four times, namely for his performance in Week 2 against Miami, Week 9 against Seattle, week 13 against San Francisco, and Week 15 against Denver. He became the first player in franchise history to win the award at least three times in a single season. On December 21, 2020, Allen and four of his teammates were named to the 2021 Pro Bowl, which took place virtually due to the COVID-19 pandemic. He ultimately finished in second-place for MVP voting, receiving four votes, which was ahead of Mahomes but behind winner Aaron Rodgers.

==== 2020–21 postseason ====
In the Wild Card Round against the Indianapolis Colts, Allen completed 26 of 35 passes for 324 yards, rushed for 54 yards, and had three total touchdowns as the Bills won 27–24 giving the Bills their first playoff win since 1995.

Facing Lamar Jackson and the number-one rushing offense and top-ten defense in the Ravens in the Divisional Round, Allen and the Bills would find themselves on the right end of a defensive battle with a 17–3 win. Allen completed 62.2% of his passes for 206 yards and one touchdown with no turnovers.

The following week, Allen faced a rematch against the Kansas City Chiefs, whom the Bills faced in Week 6, in Buffalo's first AFC Championship appearance since 1993. He completed 28 of 48 pass attempts for 287 yards, two touchdowns, and an interception that was his first career pick in the redzone, in addition to rushing for 88 yards, as the Bills lost 38–24. A minor scuffle occurred after Allen was tackled by Chiefs defender Alex Okafor after a play was blown dead in the fourth quarter, in which the former responded by flicking the ball at Okafor's helmet. Okafor began to taunt Allen until Bills linemen Jon Feliciano and Dion Dawkins shoved Okafor onto the ground. All four players received offsetting unsportsmanlike conduct penalties.

=== 2021 season ===
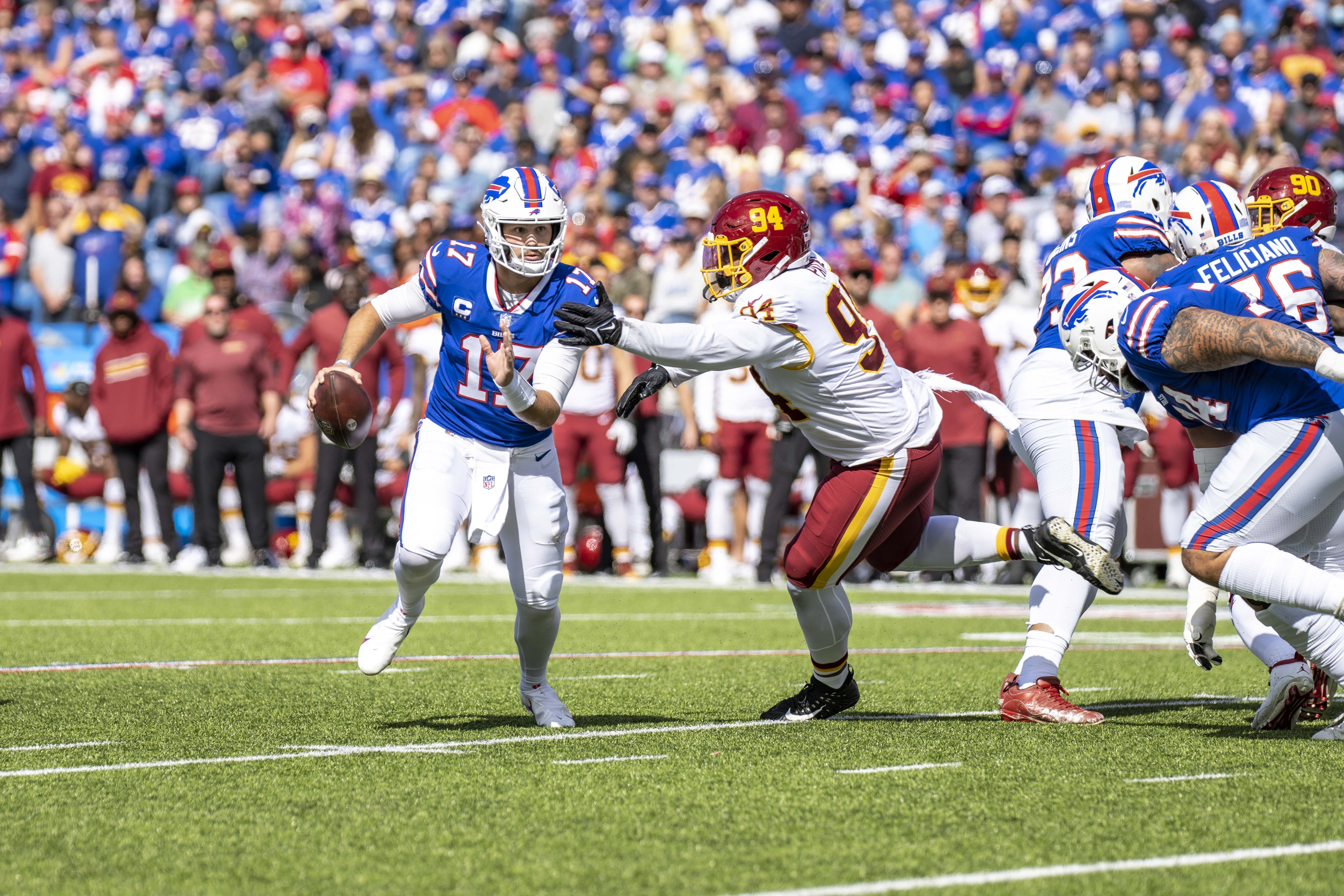
Allen in action against Washington

In May 2021, the Bills exercised the fifth-year option on Allen's rookie contract, tying him to the team through the 2022 season. On August 6, 2021, Allen signed a six-year contract extension worth up to $258 million with $150 million guaranteed that would go through to the 2028 season.

Allen surpassed 10,000 career passing yards during a 35–0 shutout win against the Dolphins in Week 2.

In Week 3, Allen and the Bills defeated the Washington Football Team 43–21, as Allen passed for 358 yards and scored five touchdowns. He became just the fourth player in NFL history to record multiple career games with at least 300 passing yards, four passing touchdowns, and a rushing touchdown. He also tied Jack Kemp's franchise record for most career rushing touchdowns by a quarterback with 26.

The Bills faced the Chiefs at Arrowhead Stadium for a rematch of the previous year's AFC Championship game in Week 5. During the Bills' 38–20 win, Allen completed 15 of 26 passes for 315 yards and three touchdowns, amassing 21 yards per completion, a career-high and the highest by any NFL quarterback in the prior two seasons. He also rushed for 59 yards and a touchdown on 11 carries, including another hurdle over a defender to pick up a first down in the fourth quarter. The following week, the Bills faced the Titans on Monday Night Football. Despite a strong performance, Allen was stopped short by the Titans' defensive line during a quarterback sneak on a critical 4th and 1 situation on the Titans 3 yard line in the final moments of the game, allowing Tennessee to win 34–31. His final stat line for the game was 353 passing yards, 3 touchdowns, and 1 interception along with 26 rushing yards. Allen's three touchdowns allowed him to pass Jim Kelly for the most touchdowns thrown by a Bills quarterback in his first four seasons with the team.

In a Week 8 rematch against Miami, Allen and the Bills offense started slow, but he accounted for two passing touchdowns and a rushing touchdown in the second half of a 26–11 win. The rushing touchdown gave Allen 28 for his career, tying Cam Newton's record for the most rushing touchdowns in a quarterback's first 50 starts. In a 6–9 loss to the Jaguars the following week, Allen was held without a touchdown for the first time in the season, in addition to being sacked and intercepted by Jaguars defensive end Josh Allen. Both the sack and interception were the first to be performed by an NFL defensive player on an opposing quarterback of the same name.

After several up-and-down performances, including a Monday Night Bills loss to the Patriots in Week 13 where the passing game was limited by high-velocity winds, Allen helped the team overcome a 24–3 halftime deficit to the Buccaneers in Week 14, rallying Buffalo to 24 second-half points to force overtime. They would go on to lose 33–27, however. Despite the loss, Allen became just the fourth player in NFL history with over 300 passing yards and 100 rushing yards in a game. During a Week 16 rematch with the Patriots, Allen passed for 312 yards, three touchdowns, and ran for 65 yards as the Bills won 33–21. He also surpassed 4,000 passing yards on the season, becoming the first Bills quarterback with multiple 4,000 yard passing seasons.

Against the Atlanta Falcons in Week 17, Allen threw for a career-high three interceptions and had a career-low passer rating of 17, but rushed for 81 yards and two touchdowns on the ground as Buffalo relied on its running game to win 29–15 and clinched its fourth playoff berth in five seasons. The two rushing touchdowns gave Allen six on the year, making him the first quarterback in NFL history to rush for at least six touchdowns in his first four seasons. Allen and the Bills finished the regular season with a 27–10 victory over the New York Jets, securing the AFC East division title for a second consecutive season. He finished the game with 239 passing yards, 63 rushing yards, and two passing touchdowns.

Allen finished the regular season with a career-high 409 pass completions, completing 63.3 percent of his passes for 4,407 passing yards, 36 passing touchdowns and a 92.2 passer rating. He also had 763 rushing yards and another six touchdowns on the ground, leading the league in yards per carry at 6.3. For his play, he was named a Pro Bowl alternate, losing out to Lamar Jackson for the final quarterback spot on the initial Pro Bowl roster, much to the chagrin of fans and analysts. When offered Jackson's spot after he pulled out, Allen declined the invitation.

==== 2021–22 postseason ====
In the Wild Card Game against the Patriots, the Bills scored a touchdown on every offensive possession they had the ball aside from the final kneeldowns as they won 47–17, attaining the first "perfect offensive game" in NFL history. Allen completed 21 of 25 passes for 308 yards and five touchdowns in addition to rushing for 66 yards, passing for more touchdowns than incompletions during the game. In the Divisional Round, Buffalo rematched against the Chiefs, whom they previously lost to in last year's AFC Championship Game. During the final two minutes of the tightly contested game, Allen threw two go-ahead touchdowns to Gabe Davis as the Bills and Chiefs exchanged leads three times before Kansas City tied the game at 36 apiece and forced overtime. The Chiefs won 42–36 in the extra period after winning the coin toss and scoring on the opening drive as Allen and the Bills offense never touched the ball. Despite the loss, Allen kept pace with Chiefs quarterback Patrick Mahomes, completing 27 of 37 passes for 329 yards and four touchdowns, all to Davis. He also rushed for 68 yards. His postseason passer rating of 149.0 is the highest ever in a single postseason, breaking the previous record of 146.4 held by Joe Montana in 1989.

=== 2022 season ===
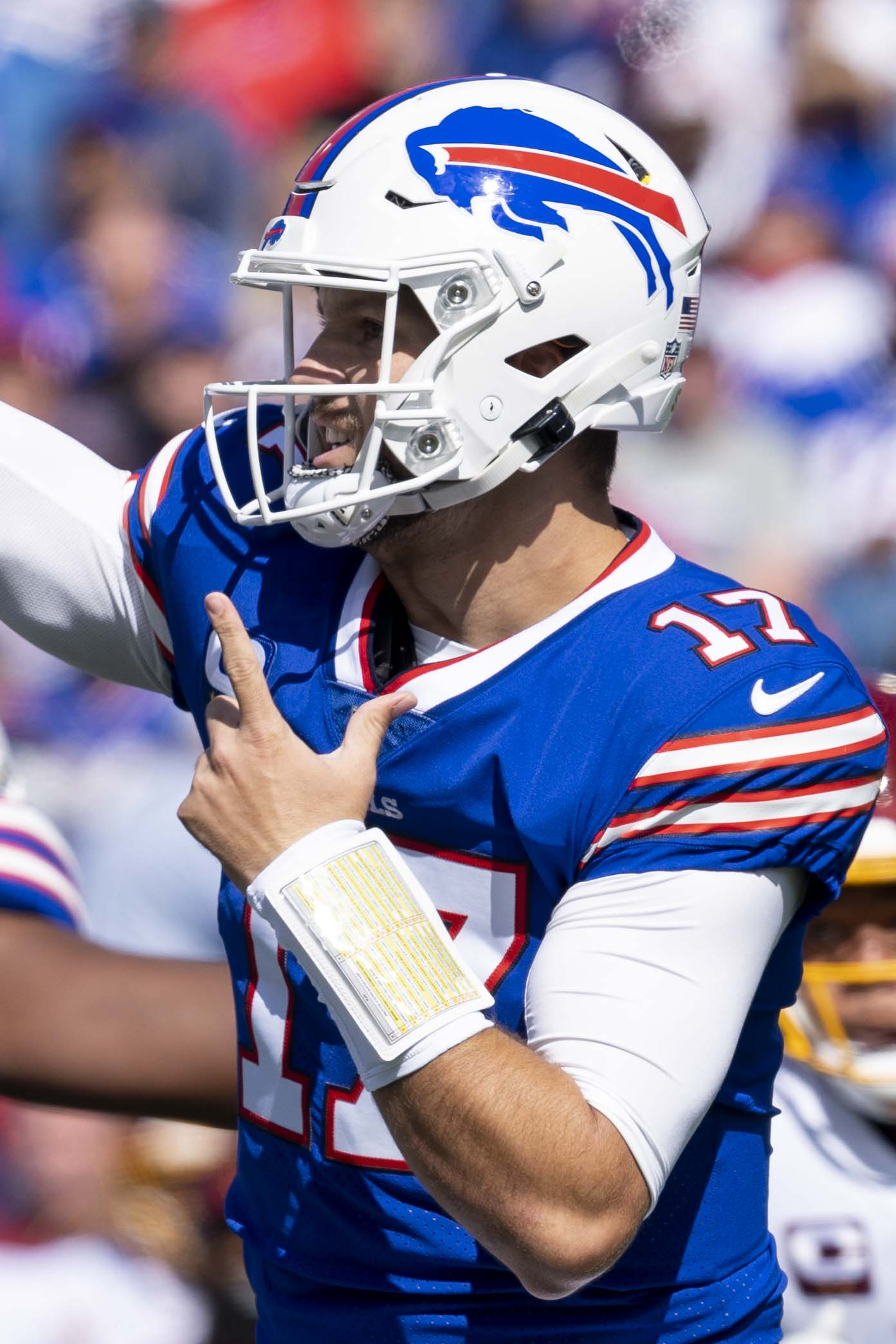
Allen during a game at Highmark Stadium

Against the Rams in the NFL Kickoff Game, Allen completed 26 of 31 passes for 297 yards, three touchdowns, two interceptions, and rushed for 56 yards and a rushing touchdown in the 31–10 win. During Monday Night Football against the Titans in Week 2, Allen completed 26 of 38 passes for 317 yards, 4 touchdowns, and no interceptions, he also rushed for 10 yards in the 41–7 win. During Week 3 against the Dolphins, Allen finished with 400 passing yards, two touchdowns, and three fumbles (one lost). A game winning drive came off line and the Bills lost 19–21. After opening up to a 20–3 deficit against the Ravens in Week 4, the Bills rallied to come back and win the game 23–20 after their defense held the Ravens scoreless in the second half and Tyler Bass kicked a walk-off field goal. Allen passed for 213 yards, one passing touchdown, one interception, and 70 rushing yards with one rushing touchdown on 11 carries. In Week 5, Allen passed for 424 yards, four touchdowns, and one interception in the 38–3 victory over the Steelers. The first of Allen's touchdowns was a 98-yard pass to Gabriel Davis toward the beginning of the game. The play tied the record for longest pass play in franchise history. In a rematch of the previous season's Divisional Round game, Allen had 329 passing yards and three touchdowns in the 24–20 come-from-behind victory over the Chiefs.

Following the bye week, Allen threw for 218 yards, two touchdown passes, and two interceptions in a 27–17 victory against the Green Bay Packers on Sunday Night Football. In Week 9 against the Jets, Allen ran for 2 touchdowns and completed 18 passes of 34 attempts for 205 yards and two interceptions in a 17–20 defeat. In that game, Allen suffered an elbow injury similar to one suffered during his rookie season, but was able to start the next week against the Vikings, where he threw for 330 yards and a touchdown, but threw two interceptions, including the game-losing interception to Patrick Peterson in the red-zone in the 33–30 overtime loss. In addition, he fumbled a snap at the goal line in the game's final seconds in regulation that led to a Vikings touchdown.

Partly owing to Allen's lingering elbow injury, the Bills opted to rely more on the run game in the following games against the Browns, Detroit Lions, and Patriots, all wins. Against Detroit on Thanksgiving Day, Allen led the Bills to a comeback win with a strong fourth quarter performance, including a touchdown to retake the lead and a 36-yard pass to Stefon Diggs that helped set up the game-winning field goal. He finished the game with 253 passing yards, two passing touchdowns, and one interception while rushing for 78 yards and a rushing touchdown.

During the Bills' Week 15 primetime matchup against the Miami Dolphins, Allen and the Bills found themselves down 29–21 with 12 minutes remaining in the game. Allen would then lead Buffalo on a 7-play drive, that included a season-long 44-yard run, and was capped off by a Dawson Knox touchdown catch and a successful two-point conversion to tie the game at 29–29. After the defense forced a Miami punt, the Bills would get the ball back at their own seven yard line with six minutes remaining. Allen would lead Buffalo on a 15-play drive that ended with a Tyler Bass game-winning field goal as time expired. Allen went 25–40 with 304 passing yards, four passing touchdowns and 77 rushing yards in the 32–29 win.

In 16 games, with the game against the Cincinnati Bengals declared a no-contest due to a life-threatening medical emergency to Bills safety Damar Hamlin, Allen compiled his third straight season with over 4,000 passing yards, 35 or more passing touchdowns, and six or more rushing touchdowns while leading Buffalo to its third consecutive AFC East division title. He was named to the 2023 Pro Bowl Games on the AFC's initial roster.

==== 2022–23 postseason ====
Allen helped lead the Bills to a 34–31 win over the Miami Dolphins in the Wild Card Round with 352 passing yards and three touchdowns to go along with two interceptions. Allen and the Bills saw their season end in the 27–10 Divisional Round loss to the Cincinnati Bengals.

=== 2023 season ===
The Bills began their season playing the division rival Jets on the road. Allen had one of his worst games, committing four turnovers to one touchdown, but led the Bills on a game-tying drive before losing in overtime, 22–16. The following two weeks, Allen rebounded and led the Bills to wins over the Raiders and Washington Commanders, scoring five overall touchdowns to just one turnover and winning the AFC Offensive Player of the Week award for his performance against Las Vegas in Week 2. This was the eleventh time Allen had received the award, breaking a franchise record once held by Jim Kelly.

In Week 4 against the Dolphins, Allen achieved a perfect passer rating of 158.3 for the first time in his career, completing 21 of 25 passes for 320 yards and 4 touchdowns while rushing for another score on the ground, as the Bills won 48–20. However, following this game, Allen and the Bills offense entered a six-game stretch characterized by inconsistency, crucial turnovers, and a general lack of scoring until the second half, with losses to the Jaguars, Patriots, Bengals, and Broncos. When asked about the team's struggles during this stretch, Allen stated that he was attempting a "low positive" mentality on the field in contrast to his typically fiery and emotional playing style and pondered if he had "reined himself in too much".

Following the Broncos loss, Bills offensive coordinator Ken Dorsey, whom Allen had vouched for in replacing Brian Daboll, was fired, being replaced by quarterbacks coach Joe Brady. Under Brady, Allen and the Bills won six of their final seven games with a more balanced attack on offense, winning their fourth consecutive division title after beating Miami 21–14 in Week 18. In particular, Allen became the first quarterback in NFL history to score 40 total touchdowns in 4 consecutive seasons, despite throwing for under 30 touchdowns for the first time since 2019 and a career-high 18 interceptions. He also tied the NFL record for rushing touchdowns in a season by a quarterback (15), with 8 of those touchdowns coming in a 5-game span during the Bills' late season surge. During an interview with NBC Sports during this period, Allen commented that he had gotten rid of his "low positive" mindset and embraced his emotional, competitive style of play:

"Josh being Josh" is just the big kid that loves football. Sometimes it's not going to be pretty, but he's going to make plays, he's going to help his team win football games. That's the only thing I've ever tried to do, just trying to be myself, and to be the leader that you can be, you have to be authentic, you have to be 100-percent who you are. Throughout times, I was trying to be somebody I wasn't in terms of trying to lead a certain way.

— Josh Allen

==== 2023–24 postseason ====
As the No. 2 seed, Allen and the Bills faced the No. 7 seed Steelers in the Wild Card Round. In the game, Allen completed 21-of-30 passes for 203 yards and three passing touchdowns as the Bills won 31–17. Allen also ran for 74 yards on eight carries, which included a career-long 52-yard touchdown run, marking the longest rushing score in Bills' postseason history and the second-longest by a quarterback in NFL postseason history. At home against the Chiefs in the Divisional Round, Allen accounted for all three of the Bills' touchdowns and 258 of the team's 368 total yards, but the Bills lost 27–24, marking their third consecutive loss in the Divisional Round.

=== 2024 season ===
Allen and the Bills started the 2024 season strong despite the departures of Stefon Diggs, Gabe Davis, and other veteran players due to cuts needed to stay below the team's salary cap, with Khalil Shakir becoming Allen's only returning wideout from the previous season. To offset the departures of Diggs and Davis, the Bills replaced them with veteran free-agent receivers such as Curtis Samuel, Mack Hollins, and Marquez Valdes-Scantling while drafting Keon Coleman, with Joe Brady insisting on an "everybody eats" mentality among the offense rather than focusing on a singular player. The Bills started 3–0 with a comeback win against the Arizona Cardinals on opening day, in which Allen hurdled over Cardinals safety Budda Baker while tweaking his non-throwing hand for one of his four touchdowns that game, and blowout wins over the Dolphins and Jaguars.

However, following the 3–0 start, Allen struggled in losses against the Baltimore Ravens and Houston Texans in which he suffered two big hits that caused him to be attended by the medical staff, namely a failed flea flicker against Baltimore that arguably stalled the Bills' comeback efforts, and a hit against Houston in which spectators opined he had suffered a concussion due to Allen's head "violently" bouncing off the ground after he landed on his ankle and chest, but he was deemed fine and allowed to finish the game after missing just under five minutes and given smelling salts. Notably, Allen only completed 9 of 30 passes in a 23–20 loss against the Texans. Despite criticism by fans and other players of the Bills' handling of Allen's injury against the Texans, a review found that the NFL and the Bills' training staff did not violate the league's concussion protocol.

Allen rebounded the following week against the Jets, finishing with three total touchdowns in a 23–20 win on Monday Night Football, breaking Patrick Mahomes' record for most total touchdowns in a player's first seven seasons. In Week 11, Allen passed for 262 yards and led the team with 55 rushing yards, including a 26-yard touchdown scramble on fourth down that sealed the game as the Bills handed the undefeated Chiefs their first loss of the season, 30–21. In Week 13 in a 35–10 win against the San Francisco 49ers, Allen became the first quarterback in NFL history to record a passing, rushing, and receiving touchdown in the same game, with the passing and receiving scores coming on an improvised hook-and-lateral with Amari Cooper. His touchdown pass to Mack Hollins was his 245th total touchdown, surpassing Jim Kelly for the most in franchise history. The following week, in a 44–42 loss to the Los Angeles Rams, Allen tallied 424 total yards and became the first player with three passing and three rushing touchdowns in a regular season game. He also surpassed Cam Newton for the most games (23) in NFL history with at least two passing touchdowns and one rushing touchdown. In Week 15, Allen completed 23 of 34 passes for 362 yards and two touchdowns, plus two scores on the ground in a 48–42 win over the NFC's top-seeded Detroit Lions, earning AFC Offensive Player of the Week.

On December 29 against the New York Jets, he scored a rushing touchdown in the first quarter to score his 65th career rushing touchdown, tying Thurman Thomas for most in franchise history. He subsequently passed for two touchdown passes to get him his 40th total touchdown on the season to extend his streak of 40 touchdown seasons to five. With playoff seeding locked, Allen started in Week 18 but left after one snap to extend his start streak to 104 regular season games, the longest active streak in the league. Allen finished the regular season with 4,269 total yards, 41 total touchdowns, and his eight turnovers marked the fewest of his career. He also combined for 747 total yards and six touchdowns against the Chiefs and Lions, helping the Bills become the first NFL team in history to beat two 15-win teams in the regular season.

On February 6, 2025, Allen received the NFL's Most Valuable Player Award with 27 of 50 (54%) first place votes. He became the third quarterback to win MVP without being named First Team All-Pro.

==== 2024–25 postseason ====
In the Wild Card Round against the Denver Broncos, Allen threw for two touchdown passes to pass Kelly for most postseason touchdown passes in franchise history in the 31–7 win. At home in the Divisional Round against the Baltimore Ravens, Allen threw for just 127 yards, but also ran for two touchdowns in a close 27–25 win en route to the AFC Championship. Against the Chiefs in the Conference Championship Game, Allen threw for 237 yards, two touchdowns, and zero interceptions. One fourth quarter play in particular was marred in controversy, as a fourth-and-inches quarterback sneak by Allen was ruled short of the line to gain, despite one crew member appearing to give Allen the first down. After review, the play stood as it was called due to insufficient video evidence for overturning it. The Chiefs scored on their ensuing drive, eventually taking the lead. Trailing by three with under four minutes left, the Bills turned it over on downs, resulting in a 32–29 loss and dropping Allen to 0–4 against the Chiefs in the playoffs.

=== 2025 season ===
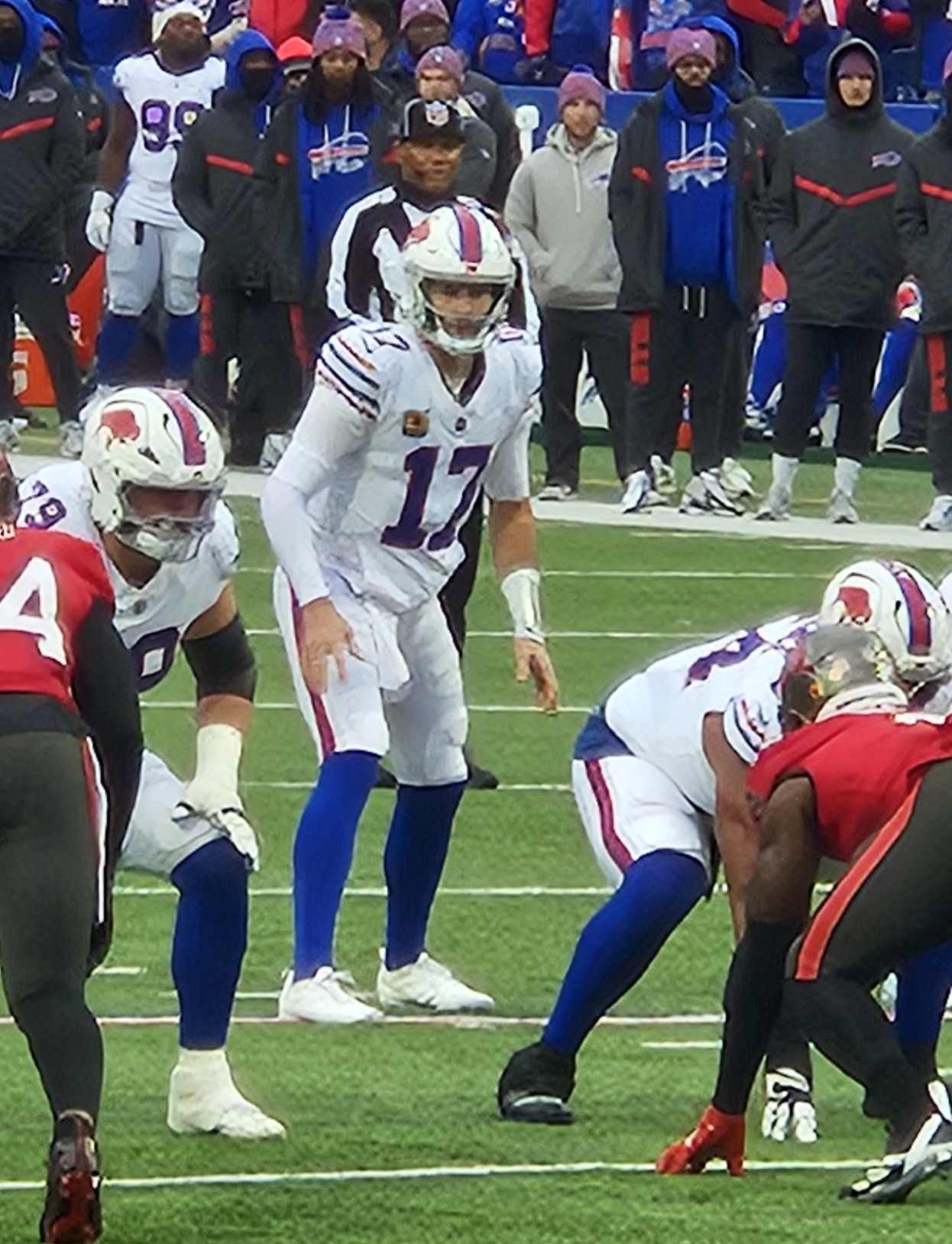
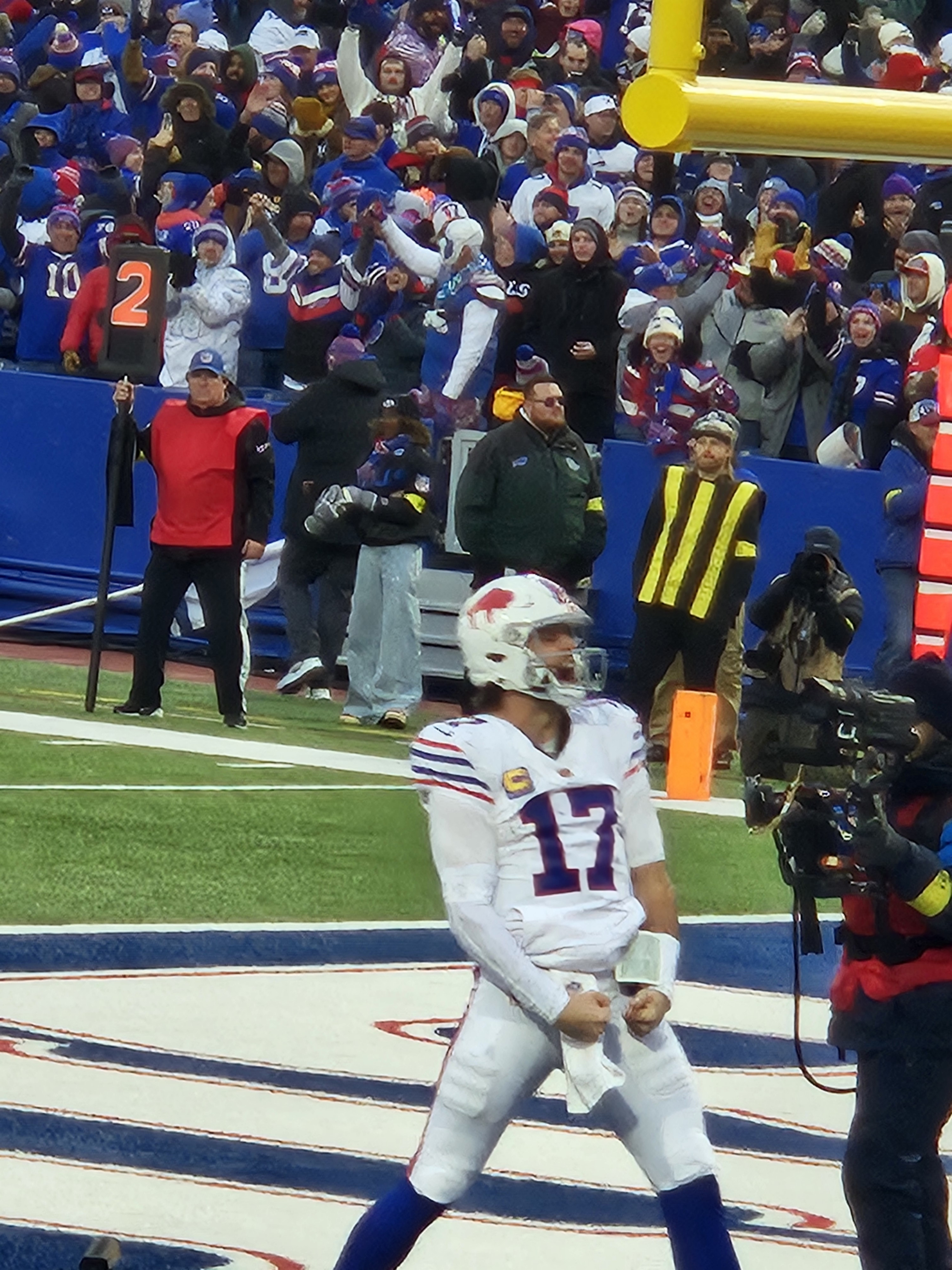
Allen in a game against the Tampa Bay Buccaneers

On March 9, 2025, Allen signed a six-year contract extension with the Bills worth $330 million, of which $250 million guaranteed, the largest guaranteed money ever given to an NFL player at the time of signing.

In the season opener against the Baltimore Ravens, Allen threw for 394 yards with two passing touchdowns and two rushing touchdowns, as he rallied Buffalo from a 40–25 deficit in the last four minutes of the fourth quarter to win 41–40. He also put up his 66th career rushing touchdown, surpassing Thurman Thomas’s previous record of 65 for the most rushing touchdowns in Bills franchise history. During the season, Allen continued to break records with his play; on October 26, Allen had a rushing and passing touchdown for the 46th game in his career to pass Cam Newton for most games with a rushing and passing touchdown in NFL history; on November 16, Allen had three passing and three rushing touchdowns against Tampa Bay to tie Newton for rushing touchdowns (75) and become the only player with multiple games of 3 passing/rushing touchdowns in NFL history. Allen then claimed sole possession of the rushing touchdowns record with an 8-yard score on November 30 against Pittsburgh.

However, Buffalo's offense was noted to have regressed during the season, with widespread criticism of the Bills' receivers and offensive coordinator Joe Brady as the offense struggled in upset losses against the Atlanta Falcons in week 6 and Miami Dolphins in week 10. In particular, Allen's time-to-throw against the Dolphins was 3.53 seconds, the longest of his career since his rookie year. In Week 12, Allen was sacked a career-high 8 times and was shut out of the endzone in a 23–19 loss to the Houston Texans.

In Week 14, Allen completed 22 of 28 passes for 251 yards and three touchdowns, plus a 40-yard rushing touchdown, in a 39–34 comeback win over the Cincinnati Bengals, earning AFC Offensive Player of the Week.

In Week 16 against the Cleveland Browns, Allen suffered a foot injury while giving up a sack before halftime, though he continued to play through it as the Bills narrowly won 23–20. The following week against the Philadelphia Eagles, Allen completed 23 of 35 passes for 262 yards, and ran for 2 touchdowns on the ground. His performance in the 13–12 loss came under scrutiny due to in-game mistakes committed by Allen in a game that, if won, would have kept them in contention for the AFC East in a late-season division race. These mistakes included a lost fumble, and a missed two-point conversion to a wide-open Khalil Shakir within the last few seconds of the game that would have given them the win.

==== 2025–26 postseason ====
In the Wild Card Round against the Jacksonville Jaguars, Allen completed 28 of 35 passes for 273 yards, rushed for 33 yards, and had three total touchdowns in the 27–24 comeback win, giving the Bills their first playoff win on the road since 1992. The next week against the Denver Broncos in the Divisional Round, he threw three touchdowns, but had four turnovers, which included a fumble at the end of the first half that allowed the Broncos to score a field goal, and was the first quarterback in ten years to throw two interceptions and lose two fumbles, as the Bills lost 33–30 in overtime. Allen took accountability for the loss in an emotional press conference, where he stated that "It's extremely difficult. Feel like I let my teammates down today." Two days after the game, the Bills fired head coach Sean McDermott. In Allen's eight years under McDermott, the Bills never made it to the Super Bowl.

During the introductory press conference for Joe Brady's promotion to head coach, Allen was seen on crutches and a walking boot on his injured foot. Allen, who was included in the interview process for the Bills' new head coach, confirmed afterwards that he had a procedure done on his foot to fix a broken bone that was aggravated in the Cleveland game, but that he would be ready for OTA activities.

=== 2026 season ===
Allen and the Bills began the 2026 season with a 36–31 road win against the Houston Texans. In the game, Allen had two passing touchdowns, one to wide receiver D. J. Moore, an offseason trade acquisition from the Chicago Bears, and the other being a game–winning pass to Josh Palmer within the final two minutes of the contest. He also had two rushing touchdowns, helping the Bills win at Reliant Stadium for the first time since 2006. The following game, just four days later on Thursday Night Football, Allen, who later admitted he was experiencing flu-like symptoms, accounted for five of the Bills' six touchdowns as the Bills won 41-31 over the Detroit Lions in their inaugural home game at the new Highmark Stadium, earning him AFC Offensive Player of the Week.

During a 37–34 overtime win on Monday Night Football against the Los Angeles Rams in Week 5, Allen finished with 210 passing yards, 121 rushing yards, an interception, and two total touchdowns. It also marked the second career game that Allen ran for over 100 yards and his first career overtime win.

== Career statistics ==
Legend
	AP NFL MVP
	NFL record
	Led the league
**Bold**	Career high

=== NFL ===
==== Regular season ====
Year	Team	Games			Passing										Rushing					Sacked		Fumbles	
Year	Team	GP	GS	Record	Cmp	Att	Pct	Yds	Y/A	Y/G	Lng	TD	Int	Rtg	Att	Yds	Y/A	Lng	TD	Sck	SckY	Fum	Lost
2018	BUF	12	11	5–6	169	320	52.8	2,074	6.5	172.8	75	10	12	67.9	89	631	**7.1**	**45**	8	28	213	8	2
2019	BUF	16	16	10–6	271	461	58.8	3,089	6.7	193.1	53	20	9	85.3	109	510	4.7	36	9	38	237	**14**	4
2020	BUF	16	16	**13–3**	396	572	69.2	**4,544**	7.9	**284.0**	55	**37**	10	**107.2**	102	421	4.1	24	8	26	159	9	**6**
2021	BUF	17	17	11–6	**409**	**646**	63.3	4,407	6.8	259.2	61	36	15	92.2	122	**763**	6.3	34	6	26	164	8	3
2022	BUF	16	16	**13–3**	359	567	63.3	4,283	7.6	267.7	**98T**	35	14	96.6	**124**	762	6.1	44	7	33	162	13	5
2023	BUF	17	17	11–6	385	579	66.5	4,306	7.4	253.3	81	29	**18**	92.2	111	524	4.7	23	**15**	24	152	7	4
2024	BUF	17	17	13–4	307	483	63.6	3,731	7.7	219.5	64	28	6	101.4	102	531	5.2	30	12	14	63	5	2
2025	BUF	17	17	12–5	319	460	**69.3**	3,668	8.0	215.8	54	25	10	102.2	112	579	5.2	40	14	**40**	**298**	7	3
2026	BUF	10	10	9–1	194	302	64.2	2,527	**8.4**	252.7	57	14	9	93.5	66	290	4.4	22	11	21	141	4	1
Career		138	137	97–40	2,809	4,390	64.0	32,629	7.4	236.4	98	234	103	94.4	937	5,011	5.3	45	90	250	1,589	75	30

==== Postseason ====
Year	Team	Games			Passing									Rushing					Sacked		Fumbles	
Year	Team	GP	GS	Record	Cmp	Att	Pct	Yds	Y/A	Lng	TD	Int	Rtg	Att	Yds	Y/A	Lng	TD	Sck	SckY	Fum	Lost
2019	BUF	1	1	0–1	24	46	52.2	264	5.7	38	0	0	69.5	9	92	**10.2**	42	0	3	27	2	1
2020	BUF	3	3	**2–1**	**77**	**120**	64.2	**817**	6.8	37	5	1	94.3	**25**	145	5.8	18	1	**8**	**94**	2	0
2021	BUF	2	2	1–1	48	62	**77.4**	637	**10.3**	**75**	**9**	0	**149.0**	17	134	7.9	26	0	2	16	1	0
2022	BUF	2	2	1–1	48	81	59.3	616	7.6	52	3	**3**	80.1	12	46	3.8	12	1	**8**	39	**3**	1
2023	BUF	2	2	1–1	47	69	68.1	389	5.6	34	4	0	101.7	20	**146**	7.3	**52**	**3**	2	14	1	0
2024	BUF	3	3	**2–1**	58	82	70.7	636	7.8	55	4	0	109.6	29	105	3.6	13	2	5	22	**3**	0
2025	BUF	2	2	1–1	53	74	71.6	556	7.5	46	4	2	99.8	23	99	4.3	26	2	4	29	**3**	**2**
Career		15	15	8–7	355	534	66.5	3,915	7.3	75	29	6	101.5	135	767	5.7	52	9	32	241	15	4

=== College ===
Season	Team	Games			Passing									Rushing			
Season	Team	GP	GS	Record	Cmp	Att	Pct	Yds	Avg	Lng	TD	Int	Rtg	Att	Yds	Avg	TD
2014	Reedley	10	6	2–4	127	259	49.0	2,055	7.9	**66**	26	5	**144.9**	120	**660**	5.5	**10**
2015	Wyoming	2	1	0–1	4	6	**66.7**	51	8.5	19	0	0	138.1	3	40	**13.3**	0
2016	Wyoming	14	14	8–6	**209**	**373**	56.0	**3,203**	**8.6**	54	**28**	**15**	**144.9**	**142**	523	3.7	7
2017	Wyoming	11	11	**8–3**	152	270	56.3	1,812	6.7	47	16	6	127.8	92	204	2.2	5
CCCAA career		10	6	2–4	127	259	49.0	2,055	7.9	66	26	5	144.9	120	660	5.5	10
Wyoming career		27	26	16–10	365	649	56.2	5,066	7.8	54	44	21	137.7	237	767	3.2	12

== Career highlights ==
=== Awards and honors ===
NFL

- NFL Most Valuable Player (2024)
- 2× Second-team All-Pro (2020, 2024)
- 4× Pro Bowl (2020, 2022, 2024, 2025)
- PFWA Most Improved Player (2020)
- Art Rooney Award (2024)
- FedEx Air Player of the Year (2024)
- 3× AFC Offensive Player of the Month (2020: September, December; 2024: September)
- 19× AFC Offensive Player of the Week (2018: Week 17; 2019: Week 11; 2020: Week 2, 9, 13, 15; 2021: Week 3; 2022: Week 5, 6, 15; 2023: Week 2, 4; 2024: Week 3, 13, 15; 2025: Week 1, 11, 14; 2026: Week 2)
- 9× FedEx Air Player of the Week (2022: Week 5, 18; 2023: Week 4; 2024: Week 14, 15; 2025: Week 1, 14; 2026: Week 1, 2)
- FedEx Ground Player of the Week (2024: Week 13)
- 7× NFL Top 100 — 87th (2020), 10th (2021), 13th (2022), 8th (2023), 12th (2024), 3rd (2025), 2nd (2026)
- Total quarterback rating leader: (2024)

College

- Second-team All-MWC (2016)
- University of Wyoming Athletics Hall of Fame
- Wyoming Cowboys Ring of Honor
- Wyoming Cowboys No. 17 retired

=== Records ===
==== NFL records ====
- Most rushing touchdowns by a quarterback, first 50 starts: 28 (shared with Cam Newton)
- Most rushing touchdowns by a quarterback: 90
- Most games with one passing touchdown and one rushing touchdown: 56
- Most games with two passing touchdowns and one rushing touchdown: 32
- Most games with two passing touchdowns and two rushing touchdowns: 10
- Most games with three passing touchdowns and one rushing touchdown: 12
- Most games with three passing touchdowns and two rushing touchdowns: 4
- Most games with three passing touchdowns and three rushing touchdowns: 2
- Most games with at least 300 yards passing and 50 yards rushing: 10
- Highest passer rating in a single postseason: 149.0 (2022)
- Most rushing touchdowns by a quarterback in a single season: 15 (shared with Jalen Hurts, 2023)
- Most rushing yards by a quarterback in postseason career: 767
- Most rushing attempts by a quarterback in postseason career: 135
- First quarterback to have a rushing touchdown, a passing touchdown and a receiving touchdown in a single game (December 1, 2024, vs. San Francisco 49ers)
- First player in NFL history with 40 or more passing and rushing touchdowns in five straight seasons (2020–2024)
- Most seasons with at least 25 passing touchdowns and five rushing touchdowns: 5
- Fastest to 300 total touchdowns: 127 games

==== Bills franchise records ====
- Most passing touchdowns, season: 37 (2020)
- Most passing yards, season: 4,544 (2020)
- Most rushing touchdowns, career: 87
- Most rushing yards by a quarterback, season: 763
- Most rushing yards by a quarterback, career: 4,721
- Most rushing yards by a quarterback in a single game: 135
- Most rushing yards by a quarterback in a single game, post-season: 92 (January 4, 2020, vs. Houston Texans)
- Most consecutive games with over 300 passing yards: 3 (shared with Jim Kelly, week 1–3, 2020)
- Most consecutive games by a quarterback scoring at least one touchdown: 21
- Most consecutive games with a touchdown pass: 23 (week 10 of 2022 through week 16 of 2023)
- Most combined passing and rushing touchdowns, season: 46 (2020)
- Most combined passing and rushing touchdowns by a rookie: 18
- Most passing touchdowns in a single playoff game: 5 (2022)
- First quarterback with multiple 4,000 passing yard seasons (2020, 2021, 2022, 2023)
- Longest touchdown pass: 98 yards (shared with Ryan Fitzpatrick, October 9, 2022, vs. Pittsburgh Steelers)
- Longest touchdown pass by a rookie quarterback: 75 yards
- Most AFC Offensive Player of the Week honors: 19
- Most combined passing and rushing touchdowns, career: 314

== Player profile ==
Allen has received praise for his unique combination of size, arm strength, speed, running ability, and overall athleticism, drawing comparisons to John Elway, Randall Cunningham, Brett Favre, and Cam Newton. Despite modest college production at a non-Power Five Conference FBS school and questions about his consistency and accuracy, Allen was considered a high-upside prospect due to his physical talents and was widely regarded as one of the top quarterbacks in the 2018 NFL draft.

"When you look at the metrics for Josh Allen...he has arguably the strongest arm ever in the history of the NFL...He is a physical specimen unlike anything the NFL has ever seen."

— John Brenkus

Allen's scrambling ability and rushing prowess are considered among his key strengths, with his combination of size, strength, and speed making him difficult to tackle. He is the all-time leading postseason rusher among quarterbacks and one of five quarterbacks in NFL history to record multiple seasons with 700 or more rushing yards. Despite a poor offensive line in his rookie year, Allen was able to elude and break tackles to keep plays alive or gain significant yardage on the ground, keeping an otherwise ineffective Buffalo offense moving. He has also been noted for his ability to leap over defenders, often in dramatic fashion, to keep offensive drives alive.

"I think he's the most physically talented player to play the position... ever."

— Former NFL quarterback and current throwing coach Jordan Palmer

Allen appeared on an episode of Sport Science prior to the 2018 NFL draft. As part of the show, Allen was equipped with sensors on his body to record his movements. Allen's release speed, which indicates ball velocity, averaged 74.3 mph, the fastest launch velocity Sport Science ever recorded on their show. In the movement pass test, which measures an ability to throw on the run, Allen's release speed was 58 mph. Despite criticism of his accuracy, when given one chance to hit a soccer goal crossbar from 35 yards away, Allen hit the crossbar. Allen was the only 2018 quarterback prospect tested that hit the crossbar. Brenkus later stated in an interview that Allen's college completion percentage was a misleading statistic, citing Brett Favre's 52% completion percentage in college as an example.

Allen is a self-identified gunslinger, attempting and completing difficult passes but sometimes taking unnecessary risks. However, his work ethic and training under former offensive coordinators Brian Daboll and Ken Dorsey, in addition to throwing coaches Jordan Palmer and Chris Hess, have been cited as instrumental in his development into a more accurate and methodical passer. Hess helped Allen fix his throwing mechanics and rely more on hip motion, resulting in Allen becoming 17% more accurate in his breakout third season as compared to his rookie year, which is an NFL-record improvement over a two-year span.

Allen has been credited with significant growth as a pre- and post-snap processor. In 2024, the NFL saw a league-wide shift toward two-high safety defensive schemes, most notably associated with coordinator Vic Fangio, which posed challenges for offenses with frequent downfield pass attempts or lacking receivers capable of winning individual man-to-man matchups downfield. Without a high-level wide receiver following the departure of Stefon Diggs, Allen and then-offensive coordinator Joe Brady adapted with a more horizontal, conservative scheme. Rather than forcing receivers into those matchups, the offense was designed to get the ball out quickly on underneath routes, creating yards after catch opportunities in space. Allen reduced his turnover-worthy play rate and threw a career-low six interceptions, down from 18 the previous season, as he attributed his improved patience in part to personal maturity off the field, stating "it's the patience that I've learned to have on the field." He won the 2024 AP NFL Most Valuable Player award, edging out Lamar Jackson.

== Personal life ==
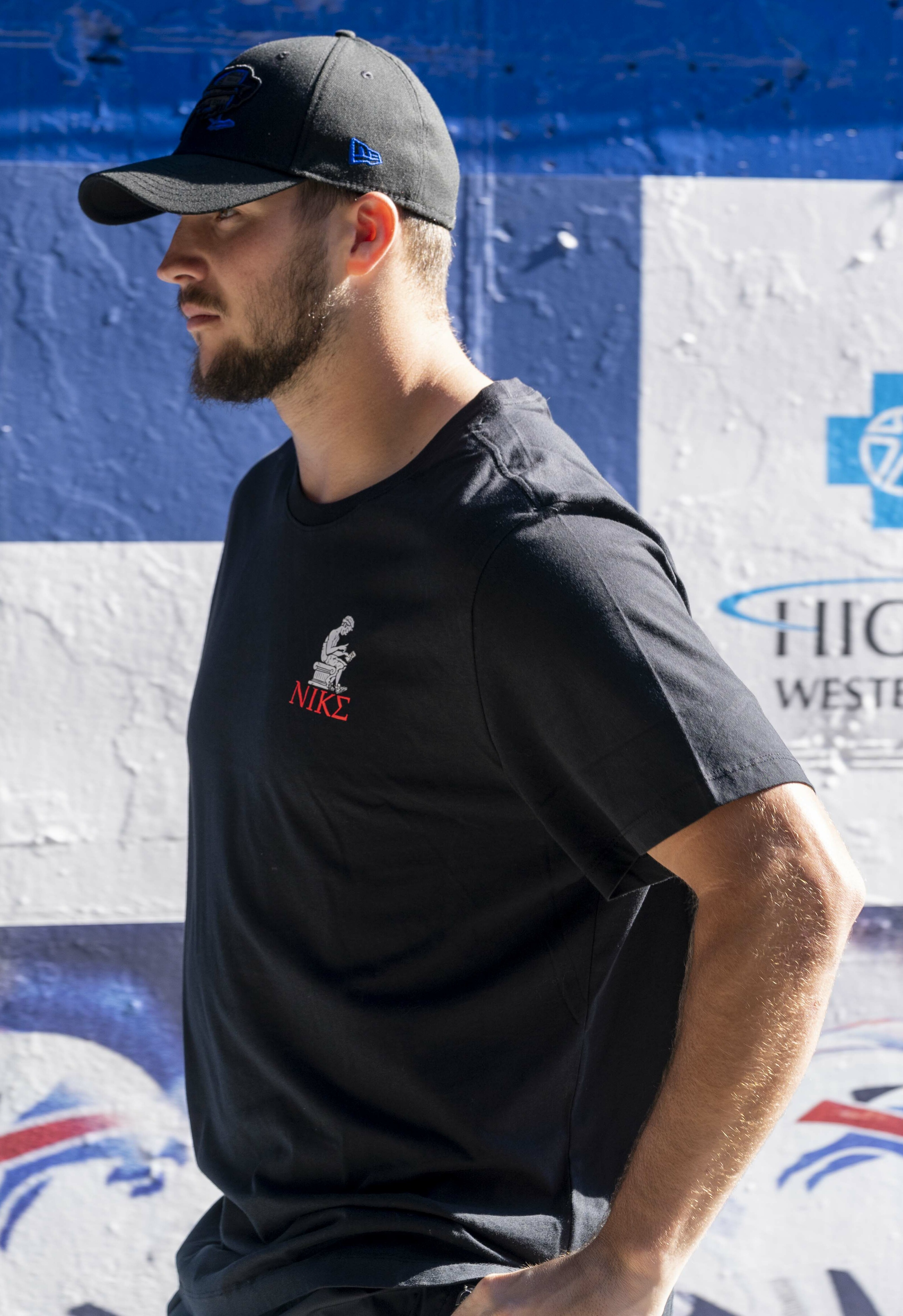
Allen in 2021

From 2015 to 2023, Allen was in a relationship with former Fresno State Bulldogs cheerleader Brittany Williams, with whom he grew up in central California.

Allen began dating actress and singer Hailee Steinfeld in May 2023, with the couple publicly revealing their relationship in July 2024. He proposed to Steinfeld on November 22, 2024, with the couple publicly announcing their engagement a week later on November 29, 2024. They were married in Ventura, California, on May 31, 2025. On December 12, 2025, they announced that they are expecting their first child together. Steinfeld announced the birth of their daughter in April 2026.

He is a fan of adult standards and oldies music, which he says keeps him calm before games. His pregame playlist includes entries by Frank Sinatra ("That's Life"), Sammy Davis Jr., Elvis Presley, Paul Anka ("Put Your Head on My Shoulder"), and Billy Joel ("The Stranger").

Allen and his family regularly attended a Methodist church when he was growing up. He stated in 2023 that "I haven't been the most devoted Christ-follower in my life, and I've had my different beliefs and thoughts and ideas and stuff like that," but that he had seen enough evidence of divine intervention to believe "God's real."

=== Golf ===
Allen is an avid golfer, which he says is one of his favorite activities. He declined an invitation to the 2022 Pro Bowl as an alternate to play in the 2022 AT&T Pebble Beach Pro-Am, finishing 55th out of a field of 156 pairs in a pairing with Keith Mitchell. He again declined to appear in the 2023 Pro Bowl Games for similar reasons. Allen participated in the sixth edition of The Match as part of a tandem with Patrick Mahomes, against Tom Brady and Aaron Rodgers, on June 1, 2022. They lost on a match-winning putt by Rodgers. He has twice participated in the American Century Championship, finishing in 58th place in the 2022 contest and 37th place in 2023.

Allen's custom home in Orchard Park, New York has a par-3 course, a separate green with six holes, three different tee boxes, and a full swing simulator. His handicap as of 2022 is 8, and his all-time best score is 77.

=== Business ventures ===
Allen is represented by Creative Artists Agency. From the beginning of Allen's professional career through 2024, he was a Nike, Inc. athlete and has stated that, "It was a dream of mine to be a Nike athlete. Seeing commercials of Kobe Bryant and being a West Coast kid and seeing all the deals that he had with Nike and all the shoes that he released. When I was coming out, it didn't really matter who else made offers. If another company was wanting to give me more money, it didn't matter. I was going to go Nike". In 2025, Allen ended his agreement with Nike and signed an endorsement deal with New Balance, with New Balance agreeing to fund youth sports programs in Allen's hometown of Firebaugh as part of the endorsement agreement.

Allen is one of eight NFL ambassadors for New Era Cap Company, an American headwear company headquartered in Buffalo, New York. Allen worked with New Era's creative team to design a special-edition cap released and sold in October 2019 to benefit Oishei Children's Hospital in Buffalo.

In July 2020, Allen was announced as a shareholder in OnCore Golf Technology, Inc., a golf ball manufacturer and golf entertainment company founded and based in Buffalo.

Following in Jim Kelly and Doug Flutie's footsteps, Allen partnered with PLB Sports & Entertainment and Wegmans in 2020 to produce his own cereal, Josh's Jaqs. Like "Flutie Flakes" and "Kelly Krunch" before it, "Josh's Jaqs" featured the image of the Bills' quarterback throwing a football on a blue box that shows the red and blue, team-colored cereal Os. Proceeds from "Josh's Jaqs" went to the Oishei Children's Hospital. Josh's Jaqs was the most successful product line for PLB since Flutie Flakes.

Allen is a fourth-generation farmer and has invested in his family's farm, the Allen Ranch, to plant and cultivate 1,000 hectares (2,500 acres) of pistachio trees over the next decade. A brand name for the pistachios is still under consideration, though Allen has joked that he could call them "Josh's Nuts".

In 2022, Gillette began sponsoring Allen, with Allen appearing in a series of Gillette commercials. Allen admitted that he partially took the sponsorship to troll rival New England Patriots fans, as Gillette is founded and based in Massachusetts and is the named sponsor of the Patriots' stadium, Gillette Stadium.

In 2023, Allen was named the cover athlete for Madden NFL 24, becoming the first Bills player to be on the cover.

On March 4, 2025, Allen signed a multi-year media deal with Skydance Sports, where he will develop scripted, unscripted, and branded content for the company. In 2026, he launched his production label Out of Pocket Studios, with financial backing from the new Skydance.

=== Philanthropy ===
Allen is a spokesperson for the Golisano Children's Hospital in Buffalo. As part of a deal with the hospital, Allen makes appearances, visits patients, and is in commercials to support fundraising efforts. During the 2019 season, Allen donated $200 to the hospital for each of his touchdowns. Allen has a personal connection to children's health because his younger brother, Jason, was hospitalized for a few days as a child with Kawasaki disease, a rare condition which inflames blood vessels.

After Allen played a game following the death of his grandmother, Patricia, Bills fans donated in $17 increments (17 being Allen's jersey number) to the hospital in her memory. By the end of 2020, the total amount donated had exceeded $1 million. On November 21, 2020, Oishei Children's Hospital announced that they would be naming a new wing on the 10th floor as the "Patricia Allen Pediatric Recovery Wing" to honor the donations received by the Bills fans. Allen and his family then consulted with the hospital to establish the "Patricia Allen Fund".

Prior to this, Allen considered starting a foundation but instead decided to support existing organizations, including the Fresno, California chapter of the Leukemia & Lymphoma Society, where his sister works in fundraising, and the Jessie Rees Foundation, which supports children fighting cancer. Allen wears a blue "NEGU" (Never Ever Give Up) bracelet from the foundation.

In March 2020, Allen donated $25,000 to the Terry and Kim Pegula Western New York COVID-19 Community Response Fund. Allen also matched $10,000 in donations to Kaleida Health's COVID-19 Response Fund.

== See also ==
- List of most consecutive starts by an NFL quarterback
- List of NFL career passer rating leaders
- List of NFL career passing completions leaders § Playoff leaders
- List of NFL career passing touchdowns leaders § Playoff leaders
- List of NFL career passing yards leaders § Playoff leaders
- List of NFL quarterback playoff records
- List of NFL career quarterback wins leaders
- List of dual-threat quarterback records
