= Mendota Unified School District =

School district in California, United States

Address
- 115 McCabe Ave Mendota, California, 93640; United States

District information
- Type: Public
- Grades: K–12
- Established: April 4, 1893
- Superintendent: Paul Lopez
- Schools: 6
- NCES District ID: 0600022

Students and staff
- Students: 3,543
- Teachers: 155
- Student–teacher ratio: 22

Other information
- Website: www.musdaztecs.com

Mendota Unified School District is a public school district based in Fresno County, California, United States.

== Schools ==
- Mendota High School
- Mendota Junior High School
- Washington Elementary School
- Mendota Elementary School
- McCabe Elementary School
- Mendota Alternative Education
