= Mendota High School =

Location
- 1282 Belmont Avenue; Mendota, Fresno, California 93640; United States
- Coordinates: 36.748483°N 120.377718°W

Information
- Type: Public
- Opened: 1993
- School district: Mendota Unified School District
- Superintendent: Paul Lopez
- Principal: Travis Kirby
- Grades: 9-12
- Enrollment: 1,085 (2023-2024)
- Hours in school day: 7.5
- Colors: Black, White & Teal
- Slogan: Building Scholars, Leaders and Champions
- Athletics: CIF Central Section (Multiple Divisions)
- Mascot: Aztec
- Team name: Mendota Aztecs
- Rival: Firebaugh Eagles
- Feeder to: Mendota Junior High School
- Information: (559) 655-1993
- Website: http://www.musdaztecs.com

Mendota High School is a public high school in Mendota, California, United States, attended largely by Hispanic-Americans.

In the 2015–2016 school year, the school contained 755 students. 99% were Hispanic, with the remainder Asian.

In 2011, the school's 12-person chess team, named the Knuckleheads, placed first in the Premier Division at the CalChess State Championships in Santa Clara, California. Jesus Espinoza was the chess team's mascot. They were honored not only by the City Council but also by the California State Assembly, which caused the Los Angeles Times to remark that for many of the players, that the 180 miles (290 km) trip to Sacramento, California "was the farthest they had ever traveled from Mendota."

The heart and soul of Mendota High School is the football team, which was recently featured in an ESPN Sportscenter special.
