= Poseidon Press =

Defunct American publishing imprint

- Parent company: Simon & Schuster
- Founded: 1982
- Successor: Simon & Schuster
- Country of origin: United States
- Headquarters location: New York City
- Publication types: Books

Poseidon Press was an imprint of Simon & Schuster publishing, operating from 1982 to 1993. The founding editor was Ann Patty, who later went on to become an executive editor at Harcourt. The imprint was best known for discovering interesting new literary voices, and launched the careers of many now-famous writers.

Poseidon Press is also the name of a fictional publishing house from the 1979 novel Proteus by Australian writer Morris West.

== Books published by Poseidon Press ==
- A Frolic of His Own, William Gaddis (1994)
- Arc d'X, Steve Erickson (1993)
- Bad Behavior, Mary Gaitskill (1988)
- Cabal, Clive Barker (1982)
- Cabal, Clive Barker (1988)
- Child of the Northern Spring, Persia Woolley (1987)
- Days Between Stations, Steve Erickson (1985)
- Fevre Dream, George R. R. Martin (1982)
- Guinevere: The Legend in Autumn, Persia Woolley (1993)
- Leap Year, Steve Erickson (1989)
- Little Kingdoms, Steven Millhauser (1993)
- Rubicon Beach, Steve Erickson (1986)
- Spider, Patrick McGrath (1990)
- Stones from the River, Ursula Hegi (1994)
- The Armageddon Rag, George R. R. Martin (1983)
- The Blindfold, Siri Hustvedt (1992)
- The Grotesque, Patrick McGrath (1989)
- The Real Frank Zappa Book, Frank Zappa (1989)
- Tours of the Black Clock, Steve Erickson (1989)
- Two Girls Fat and Thin, Mary Gaitskill (1991)
- Water Dancer, Jenifer Levin (1982)
- Weaveworld, Clive Barker (1987)
