= Days between stations =

Days Between Stations can refer to:

- Days Between Stations (novel), a 1985 novel by Steve Erickson.
- Days Between Stations is an art rock musical duo named after the novel.
- Days Between Stations, the debut album by California-based art rock musical duo Days Between Stations.
