= Kazuko =

- Gender: Female

Origin
- Origin: Japanese
- Meaning: Different meanings depending on the kanji used

Kazuko (written: 和子, 数子, 員子, 佳寿子, 嘉壽子, 加壽子, 一子, or かずこ in hiragana) is primarily a feminine Japanese given name. Notable people with the name include:

- Kazuko Fujimoto (藤本 和子; born 1939), Japanese writer and translator
- Kazuko Fujita (藤田 和子; born 1957), Japanese manga artist
- Kazuko Hara (原 嘉壽子; 1935–2014), Japanese opera composer
- Kazuko Hirabayashi (1933–2016), Japanese dance teacher and choreographer
- Kazuko Hironaka (弘中 和子), Japanese former football player
- Kazuko Hosoki (細木 数子; 1938–2021), Japanese astrologer and writer
- Kazuko Ikeda (池田 和子; born 1974), Japanese alpine skier
- Kazuko Ito-Yamaizumi (山泉 和子; 1935–2024), Japanese table tennis player
- Kazuko Ito (伊藤 和子; born 1963), Japanese former professional tennis player
- Kazuko Kadoya (門屋 加壽子; born 1953), Japanese women's basketball player
- Kazuko Kōri (郡 和子; born 1957), Japanese politician
- Kazuko Koike (小池 一子; born 1936), Japanese creative director
- Kazuko Kurosawa (黒澤 和子; born 1954), Japanese costume designer
- Kazuko Miyamoto (宮本 和子; born 1942), Japanese-born American visual and performance artist
- Kazuko Miyata (宮田 かずこ; born 1969), Japanese actress
- Kazuko Naito (内藤 和子; born 1973), Japanese table tennis player
- Kazuko Nakamura (中村和子; 1933–2019), Japanese animator
- Kazuko Saegusa (三枝和子; 1929–2003), Japanese novelist
- Kazuko Saito (斉藤 和子; born 1974), Japanese member of the Japanese Communist Party
- Kazuko Sakamoto (坂本 和子; born 1935), Japanese former swimmer
- Kazuko Sawamatsu (沢松 和子; born 1951), Japanese tennis player
- Kazuko Shibuya (渋谷 員子; born 1965), Japanese video game artist
- Kazuko Shiraishi (白石 かずこ; 1931–2024), Japanese poet and translator
- Kazuko Shirakawa (白川 和子; born 1947), Japanese actress
- Kazuko Sinoto (1928-2013), Japanese-born American historian and immigration researcher
- Kazuko Sogabe (曽我部 和子; born 1936), Japanese gymnast
- Kazuko Sugiyama (杉山 佳寿子; born 1947), Japanese voice actress
- Kazuko Tadano (只野 和子; born 1959), Japanese character designer and animation director
- Kazuko Takatsukasa (鷹司 和子; 1929–1989), Japanese princess
- Kazuko Takemura (竹村 和子; 1954–2011), Japanese scholar of English literature
- Kazuko Watanabe (渡辺 和子; 1927–2016), Japanese Roman Catholic nun, educator and writer
- Kazuko Yanaga (弥永 和子; 1947–2014), Japanese voice actress
- Kazuko Yokoo (横尾 和子; born 1941), Japanese judge and diplomat
- Kazuko Yoshiyuki (吉行 和子; 1935–2025), Japanese actress

== See also ==
- 6496 Kazuko, a main-belt asteroid
