= Days Between Stations (novel) =

1985 novel by Steve Erickson

- Vintage Contemporaries paperback
- Author: Steve Erickson
- Language: English
- Publisher: Poseidon Press
- Publication date: April 12, 1985
- Publication place: United States
- Media type: Print (hardback & paperback)
- Pages: 253 (first edition, hardback)
- ISBN: 0-671-53275-8
- OCLC: 11532077
- Dewey Decimal: 813/.54 19
- LC Class: PS3555.R47 D3 1985
- Followed by: Rubicon Beach

Days Between Stations is the first novel by Steve Erickson. Upon publication in 1985 it received notable praise from Thomas Pynchon and has been cited as an influence by novelists such as Jonathan Lethem and Mark Z. Danielewski.

It has been translated into French, Spanish, Italian, Russian, Polish and Japanese.

== Plot ==
Lauren and Jason are young newlyweds from Kansas, living in San Francisco. Lauren gives birth to Jason's son, Jules, while he is away training for cycling at the 1972 Summer Olympics. Despite this news, Jason postpones his return to support an illegitimate son he fathered. Dazed by Jason's decision, Lauren abandons the infant Jules and wanders Los Angeles aimlessly, only sheltered overnight by a stranger with a severe stutter. Lauren returns to Jules with no memory of that night. Jules develops a stutter, then dies at nine years of age.

In that exact moment, the stranger, Michel Sarasan, wakes up amnesiac, and no longer stuttering. Reuniting with his estranged uncle, Michel learns that he had older twin brothers who died young, and rediscovers his own student film, made as "Michel Sarre", documenting his mother's life in France. He subconsciously calls himself "Adrien" by accident.

Lauren and Jason move to Los Angeles, and Michel moves in downstairs; he and Lauren recognize each other but cannot remember why. Jason openly commits many adulteries, but only feels threatened for the first time by Michel's presence. Trespassing while Jason is away, Michel finds Lauren suffering from ectopic pregnancy just in time for life-saving surgery, which renders her infertile. Lauren falls in love with Michel, perceiving two people in him.

In 1900, twin baby boys are abandoned in Paris, and one is taken in at a luxurious, private brothel. Named Adolphe de Sarre, the boy grows up alongside Janine, daughter of one of the brothel girls by the owner. Adolphe mistakenly believes Janine to be his sister. When Janine is deflowered by the owner's lecherous adult son, Adolphe throws him out a window in lustful jealousy, and flees.

After serving in World War I, Adolphe watches The Birth of a Nation, intuitively developing auteurist filmmaking ideas. He writes his own film, La Morte de Marat (The Death of Marat), dramatizing the assassination of Jean-Paul Marat. Selling the ambitious script to a studio, Adolphe becomes director without any experience, relying on a sympathetic crew. Filming in the backwater village of Wyndeaux, he casts Janine—who has escaped the brothel—as Charlotte Corday. He romances her, brazenly assuming they are committing incest. An old sailor gives Janine a cognac bottle containing two living, disembodied blue eyes, but she loses the bottle.

Despite short-lived hype, Marat is plagued by controversy and delay, and finally loses studio support. The brothel owner's son takes revenge on Adolphe by buying Janine back in exchange for funding Adolphe's uncompromised vision. Janine bears two children by Adolphe, who would become Michel's uncle and mother. Adolphe suppresses the completed Marat for decades, in contrition; finally rediscovered to cinephiles' anticipation, it garners an ambivalent reception.

The amorous Lauren and Michel travel to Paris, where Lauren puts off confronting an increasingly anxious Jason in Vienna. Investigating his past at Lauren's behest, Michel nearly reunites with Adolphe, but subconsciously sabotages himself. On board the houseboat of "Bateau Billy", Adolphe's lost twin, Lauren makes short-lived peace with the loss of Jules when she finds, but then loses, the bottled eyes. She sails to Vienna; Michel follows by train, but the train repeatedly departs Wyndeaux in an unending time loop, trapping him onboard. His late brothers appear, beckoning him to view scenes of his ancestry through the windows—such as Billy impregnating his mother, decades ago.

Jason grapples with his failed marriage and medal prospects, and finally confronts the loss of Jules. Lauren arrives in time for his last race, where all racers DNF, lost in a thick fog. Michel arrives soon after, his hair and eyes aged by experiencing many decades on the train, refusing his brothers all the while. Faced with Lauren's love for Michel, Jason desperately promises to be faithful. Though Jason has lost her love, Lauren, foreseeing that Michel will resent her infertility, and understanding that Jason shares her regret over Jules, stands by Jason's side to Michel's dismay.

In Wyndeaux, Michel exhumes his brothers' graves, finding both empty. His stutter returns, and he can no longer call out Lauren's name. A letter from Adolphe, which never finds Michel, reveals that Michel had only one older brother, named Adrien.

Michel never returns, and Lauren lives amicably with Jason until one day he is killed in a bombing. Returning to Kansas, Lauren becomes a teacher for neurodivergent children, never remarrying, and never forgetting Michel, into her old age. One night, a student, Kara, unearths the bottled eyes, now appearing very old and saddened.

== Relationship to other works ==
The Death of Marat appears again or is alluded to in Erickson's novels Amnesiascope and Zeroville, and several of the characters that Erickson writes about here also appear in other works including Tours of the Black Clock, Arc d'X and The Sea Came in at Midnight.

== Reception ==
Reviewing the book, Michael Ventura of the Austin Chronicle wrote: "Erickson is brilliant. Period."
