= Grotesque (disambiguation) =

Grotesque was originally a style of ornament in art, and today also means strange, fantastic, ugly, or bizarre.

Grotesque may also refer to:

== Literature, film and television ==
- Grotesque (1988 film), a 1988 horror film starring Linda Blair
- Grotesque (2009 film), a 2009 gore/horror film starring Nagasawa Tsugumi and Kawatsure Hiroaki
- The Grotesque (novel), a 1989 novel by Patrick McGrath
  - The Grotesque (film), a 1995 British film adaptation of McGrath's novel, starring Alan Bates, Lena Headey, Theresa Russell and Sting
- "Grotesque" (The X-Files), a 1996 episode of the American TV series The X-Files
- Grotesque (novel), a 2007 Japanese novel by Natsuo Kirino
- Grotesque (Fear the Walking Dead), an episode of the television series Fear the Walking Dead
- Grotesqqque, a 2026 Japanese animated anthology film

== Other ==
- Grotesque body, a literary trope conceptualized by Russian literary critic Mikhail Bakhtin in his study of François Rabelais' work
- Grotesque dance, category of theatrical dance
- "Grotesque", a song by Saori@destiny from the album World Wild 2010
- Grotesque (band), a Swedish death metal band
- Grotesque (architecture) a form of building ornamentation often confused with gargoyles
- Grotesque (album), a 1980 album by The Fall
- Grotesque (chess), a chess problem
- Grotesque (typeface classification), a style of sans-serif typefaces originating in the late 19th century
  - Grotesque (Stephenson Blake typefaces)
- Theatre of the Grotesque, a twentieth-century theatrical style
