= Days Between Stations =

American rock band

- Oscar Fuentes Bills and Sepand Samzadeh

Background information
- Origin: Los Angeles, California
- Genres: Art rock, progressive rock, psychedelic rock, space rock
- Years active: 2003-present
- Labels: Bright Orange Records, Capitol Records USA
- Members: Sepand Samzadeh; Oscar Fuentes Bills
- Website: Days Between Stations

Days Between Stations is an American band, consisting of a partnership between guitarist Sepand Samzadeh and keyboardist Oscar Fuentes Bills. They named the band after the 1985 novel by Steve Erickson. Samzadeh describes the band's sound as "art-rock", while Fuentes describes it as "post-prog".

== Biography ==
The duo came together in Los Angeles in November 2003 after Samzadeh placed an ad in the Music Connection magazine. Release of their first album was pushed back several times as the band members faced various difficulties, including the death of a family member.

In 2004, Fuentes and Samzadeh sent Bruce Soord, leader of the British band The Pineapple Thief, a CD with nearly an hour's worth of mostly improvised material. Soord used some of this material as the basis for the song "Saturday" on The Pineapple Thief's 12 Stories Down (Cyclops 2004).

To help flesh out their sound in the studio, the band contacted former Young Dubliners drummer Jon Mattox in 2005. Mattox joined in as drummer and co-producer. Their eponymous debut CD was released in October 2007 on Bright Orange Records. It was engineered by Evren Goknar of the Capitol Mastering team who is best known for his work with Queensrÿche, Red Hot Chili Peppers and YES. The album received positive reviews and radio airplay. Former YES guitarist Peter Banks said of the album: "Days Between Stations offer an inventive, eclectic mix of electronics: sometimes relaxed sound-washes interspersed with a rhythm-driven force... the subtle textures are played with a refreshing honesty and openness underpinned with an authentic transparency of sound that avoids most of the pitfalls and potholes of scary 'prog'."

Days Between Stations second album, In Extremis, was released in May 2013. It was co-produced by YES member Billy Sherwood and Days Between Stations and it features contributions from veteran prog musicians Peter Banks, Rick Wakeman and Tony Levin.

In June 2014, the band released their first music video for the track "The Man Who Died Two Times" from the album In Extremis, featuring Colin Moulding of XTC on lead vocals.

The band's third album, Giants, was released in September 2020. It was co-produced by former YES member Billy Sherwood and the band. "Giants is a contender for best of 2020"... It is co-produced by Billy Sherwood of YES, who also plays bass, drums, and handles lead vocals on most of the songs. Colin Moulding, who sang The Man Who Died Two Times on In Extremis, returns to sing on Goes By Gravity, while Durga McBroom, backup singer from Pink Floyd, sings lead on Witness the End of the World. A music video for this song will be released by fall of 2023.

In 2019 Samzadeh and Billy Sherwood formed an Alternative Rock/Pop Music oriented side project with Jennifer Jo Oberle, on vocals, with a release date to be revealed shortly.

Days Between Stations is set to release original score music inspired by artist and photographer Jean Paul Bourdier by Spring 2024. The album is titled Perpetual Motion Machines.

By fall of 2024, Days Between Stations is anticipated to release a pre-recorded live show from a May 15, 2022 performance, featuring Billy Sherwood, Durga McBroom and David Hussey on vocals. The live band for this project is composed of Jarrad Lander (bass), Scott Connor (drums), Sepand Samzadeh (guitars) and Oscar Fuentes Bills (keyboards).

Currently, the band has commenced working on new original music for an album.

== Style ==
The band cite as influences progressive rock (Pink Floyd, Marillion, Peter Gabriel, Genesis, King Crimson) to post-rock (Sigur Rós, Godspeed You Black Emperor!), ambient music (Brian Eno, early Tangerine Dream), jazz-rock (Miles Davis' early 1970s output), post-punk (Sonic Youth, The Melvins, The Jesus Lizard) and contemporary classical (Philip Glass, Steve Reich, John Adams).

== Band members ==
=== 2003-present ===
- Sepand Samzadeh – Lead Guitar, Rhythm Guitar, keyboards
- Oscar Fuentes – keyboards, Acoustic Guitar, Bass

== Discography ==
=== Compact discs ===
- 2007: Days Between Stations
- 2013: In Extremis
- 2020: Giants
- 2024: Perpetual Motion Machines

=== Music Videos ===
- The Man Who Died Two Times (June 2014) Days Between Stations YouTube Channel

=== Contributors ===
- Jon Mattox – drums
- Jeremy Castillo – Guitar
- Vivi Rama - Bass
- Jason Hemmens - Saxophone
- Hollie Shepard - vocals
- Sean Erick - Trumpet
- Kevin Williams - Trombone
- Jeffery Samzadeh - vocals
- Colin Moulding - vocals
- Durga McBroom - vocals
- Peter Banks - Guitar
- Rick Wakeman - Keyboards
- Tony Levin - Bass
- Billy Sherwood – drums, vocals, Bass

=== Album Reviews ===
- www.Progressia.net > Review (French)
- blog.sinarchive.com > Review (Persian)
- www.rockarea.eu > Review (Polish)
- www.ragazzi-music.de > Review (German)
- www.planeta-rock.com.ar > Review (Argentina)
- www.proggnosis.com > Review (English)
- randombrainwave.blogspot.com > Review (Australian)
- www.space-rock.co.uk > Review (UK)
- www.seaoftranquility.org > Review (English)
- www.geocities.com/prognaut > Review (English)
- www.theprogfiles.com > Review (English)
- www.rocktimes.de > Review (German)
- www.dprp.net > Review (English)

== Notes ==
=== External links ===
- daysbeweenstations.com Official band site
- Official Myspace site
