= Asylum (McGrath novel) =

1996 novel by Patrick McGrath

- First edition
- Author: Patrick McGrath
- Language: English
- Genre: Gothic novel
- Publisher: Random House
- Publication place: United Kingdom
- Media type: Print
- Pages: 254
- ISBN: 0-679-45228-1

Asylum is a 1996 gothic fiction novel by British author Patrick McGrath. The novel is the chronicle of a story about self-obsession narrated by the point of view of a psychiatrist. It was adapted into a 2005 film directed by David Mackenzie.

== Plot summary ==
A beautiful woman, Stella Raphael, lives an unimaginative family life: she runs the household and takes care of her son Charlie while her husband Max works as a deputy superintendent at a maximum security psychiatric hospital. This all changes when she becomes romantically involved with Edgar Stark, an artistic talented patient who restores the old Victorian conservatory. Edgar is committed for the violent murder of his wife but this does not influence Stella's feelings. Then Edgar escapes from the institution wearing Max's clothes and takes a hiding in a shabby building in London which he uses as a studio. Stella's love for him grows stronger and while in London for "shopping" she manages to get back in contact with Edgar via his artist friend Nick.

Her visits become more and more frequent and it starts to become suspicious so she decides to leave her family permanently. The asylum wants to keep this potentially scandalous situation out of the papers but informs the police. At first Stella enjoys the underground art life but Edgar starts to become violent and jealous as he sculpts a rather morbid bust of her head. He thinks she wants to go back to Max and fears being poisoned by her. Stella, realizing the danger, finds shelter at Nick's home but she has to flee again as Edgar tries to locate her. As she feels her love again, she returns to Edgar's studio where she is arrested by the police who have lost track of Edgar.

Stella reunites with her family. Max is fired from the asylum due to the affair, so they move to the Welsh countryside where Max can work for another mental hospital. She now has to regain the trust of her son and Max, but she does not make much of an effort as she is still in love with Edgar despite his disturbing behaviour. As the family gets more depressed, Stella has simple sex with her neighbour to pass the time waiting for her lover to find her. Her hope for reunion with Edgar is strengthened when he is arrested by the police near their house. During a school trip with her son she fails to help him as he drowns in a swamp. She is found guilty of infanticide and institutionalised at the asylum where Max used to work. The asylum is now run by Peter Cleave, who wants to help her cure from her Medea complex, hoping that their friendship will evolve into a marriage. She seems to agree, but Peter does not take into account that her love for Edgar - also in the hospital in solitary - still reigns. Stella commits suicide using the pills she did not swallow as she can not be somebody else's lover. Peter keeps the bronze bust of Stella that Edgar made in his desk's drawer.

== Adaptations ==
- Asylum (2005), directed by David Mackenzie and starring Natasha Richardson, Marton Csokas, Ian McKellen and Hugh Bonneville with a cast also including Sean Harris, Joss Ackland, Wanda Ventham, Maria Aitken and Judy Parfitt.
