= Zeroville (film) =

- Theatrical release poster
- Directed by: James Franco
- Screenplay by: Paul Felten; Ian Olds
- Based on: Zeroville by Steve Erickson
- Produced by: Caroline Aragon; Vince Jolivette; Michael Mendelsohn
- Starring: James Franco; Megan Fox; Seth Rogen; Joey King; Danny McBride; Craig Robinson; Jacki Weaver
- Cinematography: Bruce Thierry Cheung
- Edited by: Curtis Clayton; Joe Murphy; Matt Diezel
- Music by: Johnny Jewel
- Production companies: Rabbit Bandini Productions; Patriot Pictures
- Distributed by: myCinema
- Release date: September 20, 2019
- Running time: 96 minutes
- Country: United States
- Language: English
- Budget: $6 million
- Box office: $78,293

Zeroville is a 2019 American comedy-drama film directed by James Franco, based on the 2007 novel of the same name by Steve Erickson. The film stars Franco, Megan Fox, Seth Rogen, Joey King, Danny McBride, Craig Robinson and Jacki Weaver.

The film was first announced in March 2011, but did not begin filming until October 2014. Originally set to be released in 2015 or 2016 by Alchemy, the distribution of the project was held off following the company's filing of Chapter 7 bankruptcy. It was eventually picked up by myCinema, and was released in limited theaters on September 20, 2019, to largely negative reviews. The film was nominated for three Golden Raspberry Awards.

== Plot ==
A young excommunicated seminarian named Vikar arrives in Los Angeles on August 9, 1969. After briefly being suspected of complicity in the Tate—LaBianca murders, which occurred the same day, Vikar takes a job at Paramount Studios, where he meets film editor Dotty Langer. Dotty senses potential in Vikar and introduces him to a studio executive known only as Viking Man. Vikar and Viking Man attend a Hollywood party, where Vikar meets actress Soledad Paladin, whom he feels he has seen before.

When Vikar shows a talent for editing, an eccentric, singing producer named Rondell hires Vikar to edit Soledad's latest film. As Vikar becomes more involved in the industry, he becomes obsessed by the idea of a "secret movie," pieces of which lie hidden inside every film ever made.

The film traces Vikar's career over the next decade as he witnesses many significant events in the history of 1970s Hollywood.

== Cast ==
- James Franco as Vikar
- Megan Fox as Soledad Paladin
- Seth Rogen as Viking Man
- Joey King as Zazi
  - Melody Veronica Vetter Cole as Young Zazi
  - Cadence Clara Vetter Cole as Young Zazi
- Jacki Weaver as Dotty Langer
- Dave Franco as Monty
- Craig Robinson as Burglar
- Gus Van Sant as Film Archive Curator
- Danny McBride as Slim
- Mike Starr as Burly
- Nick Buda as Roosevelt Clerk
- Tyler Danna as Studio Director
- Mia Serafino as Ali MacGraw
- Jason Fox as Studio Actor
- Horatio Sanz as Francis
- Ryan Moody as George
- Chris Messina as Brian
- Kevin Makely as Steven
- Mino Mackic as Marlon
- Thomas Nicholas as Marty
- Derek Waters as Paul
- Nanghana as Foxy Brown
- Keegan Allen as Your Pale Blue Eyes Killer
- Steve Erickson as The Projectionist
- Jacob Loeb as Iggy / Darby / David
- Nina Ljeti as Patti
- Scott Haze as Charles
- Una Jensen as Lorna Doom
- Aaron Garcia Silverman as Ivan Král
- Tim Blake Nelson as Professor Kohn
- Wim Wenders as Larry
- Alberto Barbera as Mostra President
- Thaila Ayala as Maria in Venice
- Will Ferrell as Rondell (uncredited)
- Stewart Strauss as Dennis Hopper (uncredited)
- Jamie Costa as Additional Voices

== Production ==
In March 2011, the novel by Steve Erickson was optioned by actor James Franco for a feature film. On October 24, 2014, the ensemble cast joined the film, which includes Seth Rogen, Jacki Weaver, Megan Fox, Will Ferrell, Jamie Costa, Danny McBride, Dave Franco, Craig Robinson, Joey King and Horatio Sanz.

=== Filming ===
The principal photography of the film began on October 24, 2014, in Los Angeles, California. Filming also took place in Pasadena in November.

== Release ==
On September 12, 2015, it was announced Alchemy had acquired US distribution rights to the film. However, the company filed for bankruptcy, leaving the film without a distributor. In April 2019, it was announced myCinema had acquired distribution rights to the film. It was released on September 20, 2019. The film is considered a box-office bomb.

== Reception ==
=== Critical response ===
On Rotten Tomatoes, the film has an approval rating of 23% based on 31 reviews, with an average rating of 4.1/10. The website's consensus reads, "Potentially an ironic favorite for cult film fans, Zeroville is a fundamentally misguided -- and descriptively titled -- passion project for its director and star." On Metacritic, the film has a weighted average score of 28 out of 100, based on 13 critics, indicating "generally unfavorable reviews".

Peter Debruge of Variety magazine wrote: "Franco has a truly radical streak in him, and considering how poorly the movie functions as a traditional crowdpleaser, he might as well have gone all out and pushed Zeroville to whatever event horizon the deranged project called for. His mistake wasn’t trying to adapt Erickson’s novel at all, but attempting to turn it into a tragic romance between Vikar and Soledad."

=== Accolades ===
The film was nominated for three Golden Raspberry Awards, James Franco was nominated for Worst Director and Worst Actor, and Seth Rogen was nominated for Worst Supporting Actor.
