= Spider (novel) =

1990 novel by Patrick McGrath

- Cover of the first edition
- Author: Patrick McGrath
- Language: English
- Genre: Psychological fiction
- Published: 1990 in New York City, U.S.
- Publisher: Poseidon Press (by Simon & Schuster)
- Publication place: United States
- Media type: Book
- Pages: 224
- ISBN: 0-679-73630-1
- OCLC: 23652235
- Dewey Decimal: 813/.54 20
- LC Class: PS3563.C3663 S6 1991
- Preceded by: The Grotesque (1989)
- Followed by: Dr. Haggard's Disease (1993)

Spider is a novel by the British novelist Patrick McGrath, originally published in the United States in 1990. In the novel, a psychological thriller with an unreliable narrator, the protagonist wrestles with mental illness and trauma from his past.

== Plot ==
Spider, birth name Dennis Cleg, is a recent arrival from a psychiatric hospital to a halfway house in the East End of London—just a few streets away from the very house where he grew up, which was the scene of some barely visible but tremendous trauma that gradually emerges from the fog of Spider's reminiscences.

As the story opens, Spider has just taken up residence in the halfway house, under the stern eye of Mrs. Wilkinson, along with a handful of others he calls "dead souls". He takes daily walks to the River Thames, following the old canals and towpaths that run along the edge of his memories, under the shadow of the immense oil and gas tanks that dominate the industrial landscape. As he sits on a bench, rolling his own cigarettes, he begins to tell the tale of his childhood, recounting his remote, emotionally brutal father and his slight, quiet, protective mother.

He is, or so he states, writing all this down in a notebook that he keeps hidden, variously, under a newspaper drawer liner, under the damaged linoleum floor of his room, or up the chimney of a disused gas fire.

== Film adaptation ==
Spider was adapted as a film by David Cronenberg in 2002. The title role was played by Ralph Fiennes.
