= Tours of the Black Clock =

Book by Steve Erickson

- Author: Steve Erickson
- Language: English
- Genre: Avantpop
- Publication date: 1989
- Publication place: United States
- Preceded by: Rubicon Beach
- Followed by: Arc d'X

Tours of the Black Clock is the third novel by Steve Erickson, published in 1989. It has been translated into French, Spanish, Dutch and Japanese among other languages. The narrative concerns itself with two of the most influential figures of the 20th century, as Adolf Hitler appears as an important character, and allusions are made to Albert Einstein and the theory of relativity. The novel was cited as one of the year's best by the Village Voice and the New York Times Book Review and is included on Larry McCaffery's list of the 20th Century’s Greatest Hits: 100 English-Language Books of Fiction.

== Plot summary ==
The novel follows a seemingly relativistic plot, where time and space disappear as absolutes. The first part concerns Marc, the son of a woman named Dania. He becomes a boatman, ferrying tourists from the mainland to Davenhall, the small island in the river where he grew up. Marc leaves town the night he sees a strange man die at his mother's feet, and spends fifteen years on the boat, never setting foot in town, until he meets a girl in a blue dress, who never returns with the other tourists. Marc goes onto the island to look for her, and sees his mother. Their meeting conjures up the ghost of the man who died fifteen years before, and his story takes over the novel. The ghost tells his story in first person. His name was Banning Jainlight, and he begins by recounting his birth. He has the ability to look through the windows of his bedroom and see his time, as if looking at the Zeitgeist. After killing a brother and burning down the ranch house where he grew up, Jainlight moves to New York City, where he becomes a writer of pornographic stories. These stories are eventually purchased by an eccentric German named Client X, Josef Goebbels.

Jainlight writes stories about a fantasy version of Dania, whom he is in love with, and the stories attract the attention of Adolf Hitler, known as Client Z. Hitler is obsessed with the new character, imagining her to be his niece and object of lust, Geli Raubal. The stories alter the course of history, as they change Hitler's mind about how to conduct the war. England falls. Russia and Germany have a tense peace. The Germans decide that they are finished with Jainlight, and they kill his wife and daughter to silence him.

He lives for a long time in a prison in Italy. Eventually, he hears his stories broadcast over the radio as propaganda. He comes up with an escape plan, after finding Adolf Hitler in the same prison, now a senile old man. Jainlight and Hitler escape to America to chase the ghost of the woman they both love. Hitler dies in New York City. Jainlight finds his way to Davenhall, where he lives for seventeen years in the hotel with Marc and Dania, trying to summon up the courage to ask for forgiveness. On the night Marc leaves town, Jainlight knows his life is slipping away, and he staggers down the hall, hoping to have time to ask Dania's forgiveness, but dies before doing so.

The custom in town is to hang the dead in a tree until they say their name. When Dania claims to know the name of the dead man in the tree, she is accused of lying. Somehow, the 20th century heals itself, the two timelines, the one we know, and Banning's timeline of a German victory, come back together.

Dania passes away shortly after her son returns to the island. After her death, Marc goes to chase after the girl in the blue dress, and winds up traveling through time, going from the end of the century back to its beginning.

== Relationship to other works ==
The people in Erickson's novels, as well as the places, do not stay in the novels in which they're written. The town of Wyndeaux, the setting for much of Erickson's first novel, Days Between Stations, reappears here. Banning Jainlight appears in Erickson's later novels, The Sea Came in at Midnight and Our Ecstatic Days. In Amnesiascope, Erickson makes a reference to Black Clock Park, a fictional Los Angeles park where time capsules are buried. From 2004 to 2016 Erickson was founding editor of the national literary journal Black Clock.
