= Floating in My Mother's Palm =

1990 novel by Ursula Hegi

- Book cover
- Author: Ursula Hegi
- Language: English
- Genre: Novel
- Publication date: 1990
- Publication place: United States

Floating in My Mother's Palm is a 1990 novel by Ursula Hegi.

The story centers on a young girl, Hannah Malter, growing up in post-war Germany and her family and many of their fellow townsfolk in 'Burgdorf', including Trudi Montag who also appears in Hegi's Stones from the River.
