= Sepand Samzadeh =

- Born: 21 September 1975 (age 51); Tehran, Iran
- Genres: Post Rock Experimental Rock, Progressive Rock, Art Rock, Ambient
- Occupations: Musician, Composer, producer, audio engineer
- Instruments: Guitar, Bass guitar, tar, Dobro, Lap steel guitar, Synthesizer, programming, vocals
- Years active: 2003–present
- Labels: Bright Orange Records, Station One LLC
- Member of: Days Between Stations
- Website: www.daysbetweenstations.com

Sepand Samzadeh (born 21 September 1975) is an American-Canadian musician and producer. He is the co-founder, lead guitarist, and co-songwriter/co-producer of Days Between Stations.

== Early life and education ==
Born in Tehran, Iran, he finished first grade in Tehran and due to the Iranian Revolution and turmoil, Samzadeh's family moved to Marbella, Spain in 1981. He attended a private American Catholic school, simultaneously adding the Spanish and English language to his native Persian.

At the age of seven, Samzadeh's first influences were The Beatles and Synth Pop. On the 8th of May, 1986 Queen came to Marbella. That evening after being informed it was past his bedtime, Samzadeh went to his room and was greeted by the percussive intro to We Will Rock You, he opened his window and was forever changed.

By October 1986, Samzadeh's family moved from Marbella to Toronto, Canada. In 1987 Samzadeh watched the film La Bamba, and it was the defining moment in which he wanted to become guitar player. Rockabilly artists such as Ritchie Valens, Buddy Holly, and Eddie Cochran were his first guitar heroes.

As a result of his upbringing, Samzadeh was able to connect with many different cultures, languages and genres of music, which included Heavy Metal, Thrash Metal, Synth Pop, Classic Rock, Alternative Rock, Grunge, Classical Music, Persian traditional music and to then new electronic Acid House music being released out of Spain.

By the winter of 1991, Samzadeh discovered his favorite and most influential band, Nirvana. By university, mid to late 90's, Samzadeh was heavily exposed to the House and Trance Music scene in Toronto.

The amalgamation of all his musical influences exposure evidences itself in Days Between Stations' songs such as Requiem for the Living.

Finally, Samzadeh's family moved to Los Angeles, California in 1994, and Samzadeh decided to stay in Toronto, accepting to attend University of Toronto's Mechanical Engineering program. He graduated in 1999. That year Samzadeh decided to move to Hamilton, Canada to gain work experience as an engineering project manager in a steel plant. By August 2001, Samzadeh moved to Los Angeles to accept and earn an MBA degree from Pepperdine University.

== Career ==
In fall 2003, Samzadeh placed an ad in a local magazine and Oscar Fuentes Bills responded. The two began composing music and Fuentes suggested a name for the band, Days Between Stations – the name of a novel Fuentes had read by Steve Erikson. In 2004, Fuentes and Samzadeh sent Bruce Soord, leader of the British band The Pineapple Thief, a CD of mostly improvised material. Soord used some of this material as the basis for the song "Saturday" on The Pineapple Thief's 12 Stories Down (Cyclops 2004).

To help flesh out their sound in the studio, the band contacted former Young Dubliners drummer and Fuentes' college friend, Jon Mattox in 2005. Mattox joined as drummer and co-producer. Their eponymous debut Days Between Stations was released in October 2007 on Bright Orange Records

In 2008, Fuentes and Samzadeh began working on their second album, named In Extremis. In 2012, Fuentes and Samzadeh, looking for a vocalist, were introduced to Billy Sherwood, who co-produced the album, co-wrote the lyrics and mixed In Extremis. Sherwood also helped arrange the song The Man Who Died Two Times. Peter Banks was the first to be brought into the project. Banks had praised the band on their debut album and had struck up a friendship with Samzadeh and became an instrumental force on two songs, Eggshell Man and In Extremis before dying. Banks was set to record on the entire album before his untimely and unexpected passing. Tony Levin played bass on the entire album and Rick Wakeman and Colin Moulding delivered their contributions to Eggshell Man and the Man Who Died Two Times, respectively.In Extremis, was released 15 May 2013. The album ranked on many of 2013's top 10 Progressive rock albums, landing No.1 in Germany and Holland.

Though recorded from 2013 to 2016, the third Days Between Stations album, Giants, was released in September 2020 to worldwide acclaim. Giants features Samzadeh, Oscar Fuentes Bills, Colin Moulding, Durga McBroom and Billy Sherwood.

In 2019 Samzadeh and Billy Sherwood formed an Alternative Rock/Pop Music oriented side project with Jennifer Jo Oberle, on vocals, with a release date to be revealed shortly.

Days Between Stations is set to release original score music inspired by artist and photographer Jean Paul Bourdier on November 29, 2024

In 2025, Days Between Stations is set to release a pre-recorded live show from a May 15, 2022 performance, featuring Billy Sherwood, Durga McBroom and David Hussey on vocals. The live band for this project is composed of Jarrad Lander (bass), Scott Connor (drums), Sepand Samzadeh (guitars) and Oscar Fuentes Bills (keyboards).

Days Between Stations is currently gearing up to record more original music.

== Personal life ==
Samzadeh resides in Los Angeles, California and maintains a studio in San Fernando Valley. Samzadeh is dedicating his life to his two boys, Tiam Samzadeh and Idin Samzadeh and the environment. In 2012 the Mayor of Los Angeles appointed Samzadeh a City Commissioner for his business skills and his strong ethics.

== Discography ==
=== Compact disks ===
Year	Album	Artist
2007	Days Between Stations	Days Between Stations
2013	In Extremis	Days Between Stations
2020	Giants	Days Between Stations
2024	Perpetual Motion Machines	Days Between Stations
