= Trauma (novel) =

2008 novel by Patrick McGrath

- First edition
- Author: Patrick McGrath
- Language: English
- Publisher: Bloomsbury
- Publication place: United Kingdom
- Media type: Print
- Pages: 210 pp
- ISBN: 9780747596646
- Preceded by: Port Mungo

Trauma is a 2008 novel by British author Patrick McGrath, centered on post-traumatic stress disorder cases as narrated by an American psychiatrist.

== Plot summary ==
Set during the 1970s, Trauma focuses on the life of Dr. Charlie Weir, who lives and works in New York City as a psychiatrist specializing in the treatment of posttraumatic stress disorder. Charlie's narration begins with a reminiscence of his early life and his mother's developing struggle with depressive illness, before moving into other traumatic instances of his relationship with his mother before the revelation of her death. Charlie rekindles a relationship with his ex-wife Agnes of the day of his mother's funeral, triggering Charlie to relive the reasons for their separation, namely the suicide of Agnes brother Danny. Eight years prior to this, Charlie worked as a psychotherapist helping veterans of the Vietnam War to overcome their post-traumatic stress. Included amongst his patients was Danny, who was well-respected by the other veterans, though rarely spoke. Charlie, in an attempt to draw him out of his malaise, followed Danny to a bar and attempted to engage him about his experiences, an act that Charlie would later believe to be the direct cause for man's suicide, as soon after he killed himself with a gun in his shower. At the same time as Charlie is recounting these memories, he has also begun a new relationship with Nora Chiara, which quickly turns sour. Nora begins to have violent nightmares that Charlie attributes to some psychological disorder, though she refuses to seek treatment. The strain this places on their relationship, in combination with Charlie's negative relationship with his family and his continuing return to painful memories associated with Danny, forces Charlie to confront his repressed traumas. He retreats to an old family holiday destination in the Catskills, triggering the repressed memory of his mother threatening to kill him at gun point, and ending in a confrontation with his brother and father in which Charlie shoots his brother. The novel ends as Charlie waits for psychiatric aid to arrive, and, as he believes, to be taken 'home' to a state hospital for the insane.

== Themes ==
=== Post-Traumatic Stress Disorder ===
A central theme of the text is the effects of post-traumatic stress and the ways in which the mind deals with significant psychological trauma. As McGrath states:

[Charlie Weir] suffers trauma, but then rather than try to heal himself, have it seen to as he says, he instead examines it rather like a scientist, who has scratched his skin and infected himself with some virus. He watches it, simply out of the curiosity as to what psychologically it looks like when one suffers the sort of disorder – the sort of post-traumatic disorder – that he has observed in his patients.

== Reception ==
Trauma received positive reviews from critics. In a review for The Guardian, Hilary Mantel praised McGrath's "imaginative scope" and "vigilant" methods, finding the novel effective as a "sober, tightly written character study." However, she felt it didn't quite convey the sense of dread it was building toward.

Writing in the New York Times, Michiko Kakutani said that while not as Gothic as some of McGrath's previous works, Trauma still showcases his "potent storytelling powers" in portraying the protagonist's "emotional distress" and "fevered brain." She described it as a "transitional work" for McGrath that relies less on metaphor and the bizarre.

Lucy Beresford, reviewing the novel for the New Statesman, called Trauma a "haunting account" and a "gritty exposé of life on the hinterland of sanity." She commended McGrath's ability to explore dark psychological extremes without alienating the reader, and his adept handling of clinical details.
