= Cabal (novella) =

Novella by Clive Barker

- First edition (US)
- Author: Clive Barker
- Cover artist: Clive Barker
- Language: English
- Genre: Horror
- Publisher: Poseidon Press (US); Collins (UK)
- Publication date: 1988
- Publication place: United Kingdom
- Media type: Print (hardcover)
- Pages: 368 (195 for the novella itself)

Cabal is a 1988 horror novella by the British author Clive Barker. It was originally published in the United States as part of a collection comprising a novel and several short stories from Barker's sixth and final volume of the Books of Blood.

== Plot ==
Boone, a young man suffering from an unspecified mental disorder, is told by his trusted psychiatrist, Decker, that he is responsible for brutal serial murders in Calgary, which Boone has no recollection of committing. After a suicide attempt, Boone is taken to a clinic and told by a fellow patient named Narcisse that he knows the location of Midian, a semi-mythical city that welcomes monsters. Believing that Boone is an emissary of Midian, Narcisse reveals Midian's location to him and maniacally savages his own face with a razor. Horrified, Boone escapes the clinic.

Following Narcisse's directions, Boone locates Midian, which lies beneath a cemetery. At the cemetery, two denizens of Midian, known as Night Breed, reveal themselves and attack Boone; one of the assailants bites into Boone's neck, but he narrowly escapes. Decker appears and reveals to Boone that Decker himself had committed the murders and framed Boone as a scapegoat. Boone is shot dead by the local policemen, who had been pursuing him alongside Decker. Boone's body is placed in a morgue, but it later mysteriously disappears.

Boone's lover, Lori, is unable to cope with what she has been told about Boone, so she travels to Midian for answers. Along the way, she makes friends with Sheryl, who accompanies her, though Sheryl stays in town and does not enter the cemetery. Lori encounters a small, frail creature writhing in pain at the cemetery. One of the Night Breed, Rachel, begs Lori to bring the creature to her. When she does so, the creature transforms into a human child: Rachel's daughter, Babette. As thanks, Rachel says she knows Lori has come for Boone, but the Night Breed leader, Lylesburg, silences Rachel and refuses her entrance to Midian.

Decker seduces Sheryl, kills her, and reveals his identity to Lori. Lori narrowly escapes Decker and returns to Midian, where a revived Boone saves her against Lylesburg's wishes. As punishment, Lylesburg exiles the couple. Boone and Lori return to her hotel, where they discover Decker has massacred many people. The police arrive and, though Lori flees, Boone uncontrollably eats some of the dead bodies before getting arrested. Decker convinces the bigoted police chief, Eigerman, to go to Midian and capture or kill everyone living there. Eigerman sends a small squad of officers to scout Midian, and they kill one of the Night Breed. Babette telepathically tells this to Lori.

Lori meets up with Narcisse, and together they help Boone escape from jail. Eigerman and Decker organise a lynch mob to attack Midian, including a priest named Ashbery. Boone, Lori, and Narcisse find that Eigerman's men have overrun Midian and that many of the Night Breed have been killed, forcing them out from the underground by setting the city aflame. Decker kills Narcisse during the battle, but Boone kills him. Eigerman's men are chased off by the Night Breed, but Midian is completely destroyed, and many Night Breed have been killed. Eigerman and Ashbery form a team to eradicate the Night Breed. Baphomet, the creator of Midian, re-baptizes Boone as "Cabal" and grants him new power, tasking him with finding a new home for the Night Breed, a task he accepts.

== Editions ==
In 2013, small press publisher Fiddleblack released an "annotated, limited edition" of the novella, titled Cabal & Other Annotations. The hand-numbered books were limited to a run of 300 and contained a collection of essays from Barker-centric contributors such as Peter H. Gilmore and Nicholas Vince, as well as artwork by Barker himself and a sizeable appendix of scholarly footnotes by horror philosopher Eugene Thacker.

== Adaptations ==
- Nightbreed (1990), film directed by Clive Barker.
- A television adaptation is in development at SyFy, directed by Michael Dougherty and written by Josh Stolberg.
