= Martha Peake: a Novel of the Revolution =

Novel by Patrick McGrath

- First edition
- Author: Patrick McGrath
- Genre: Gothic fiction Historical fiction
- Publisher: Viking Press
- Publication date: 2000

Martha Peake: a Novel of the Revolution is a 2000 novel by the British author Patrick McGrath. It tells the story of the grotesquely crippled Harry Peake and his daughter Martha, their involvement with the mysterious anatomist Lord Drogo, the tragic events that separate them, and the subsequent flight of Martha to America at the dawning of the Revolution.

== Plot ==
The work is narrated by Ambrose Tree as he asks his elderly Uncle William about the story of the "Cripplegate Giant" Harry Peake, his daughter Martha, and Lord Francis Drogo, a famous anatomist that William served during his youth. Throughout the story there are gaps in the narrative as Uncle William is encouraged to reveal more and in one instance Ambrose falls into a fever, leading him to believe that something haunts Drogo Hall. As the story of Martha and Harry is told, Ambrose explores the house and becomes convinced that his uncle has been complicit in the death of Harry Peake so that his body could be experimented upon by Lord Drogo.

Harry is a Cornishman with a hunchback who was disfigured in an accident. He left Cornwall for London in order to make a living telling stories of his time as a fisherman and smuggler. While there he and Martha are caught up in the debates surrounding the British colonies in North America, during which time Harry reveals that he is a strong supporter of the American cause. Harry's storytelling ability and grotesque appearance eventually attracts the attentions of Lord Drogo, who conducts anatomical demonstrations at his home, Drogo Hall, and is particularly interested in Harry's disfigurement.

Harry's involvement with Drogo ends up leading him to his downfall, as he begins drinking heavily, forcing her to flee to Drogo Hall. The two reconcile, only for Harry to shatter their fragile relationship when he rapes Martha after drinking himself completely insensible. With William's help Martha travels to America to stay with her aunt's family. Guilt-stricken, Harry begins wandering the marshes around Drogo Hall believing that Martha may still be hiding within. On the voyage to America Martha discovers that she is pregnant. She also meets the British Army officer Captain Hawkins, who has been sent to quell the rising discontent prevalent in America, which is especially prevalent in Boston and in the coastal town of New Morrock, where her aunt's family lives.

Once in New Morrock, Martha is held in suspicion by the resentful local women, especially after she marries her cousin Adam. As her pregnancy progresses Martha's husband and his family become more embroiled in the Revolution, resulting in the town's men going to fight in the Revolutionary War. Martha gives birth to a son she names Harry during the winter but conceals the truth of his birth from everyone but her cousin Sara. Harry is born with a spine similar to his true father and this, along with Martha's background, cause the women in town to suspect her as a British spy. These suspicions appear to be confirmed when Captain Hawkins arrives in New Morrock and recognizes Martha, which effectively pushes her to kill the Captain in order to prove her loyalty to America. Martyred, the young Harry is spirited away to be raised as the son of a patriot family in the new republic.

The narrative of the book is often interrupted as Uncle William is encouraged to reveal more. Ambrose fills in the parts of their stories that William omits or refuses to discuss and falls into a fever at one stage leading him to believe that spirits or dark forces haunt Drogo Hall. As the story of Martha and Harry is told, Ambrose explores the house and becomes convinced that his uncle has been complicit in the death of Harry Peake so that his body could be experimented upon by Lord Drogo. However, in the novels' denouement it is revealed that the haunting that Ambrose suspects is in fact the aged Harry Peake whom his Uncle William has cared for after Lord Drogo's death.

In the novels' denouement it is revealed that the haunting that Ambrose suspects is in fact the aged Harry Peake whom his Uncle William has cared for after Lord Drogo's death.

== Characters ==
- Ambrose Tree, the book's narrator
- Dr. William Tree (Uncle William), Ambrose's uncle, medical assistant to Lord Drogo
- Harry Peake, a crippled former smuggler from Cornwall
- Martha Peake, Harry's daughter
- Lord Drogo, an anatomist interested in Harry's deformity
- Clyte, a "resurrection man" who works for Lord Drogo
- Captain Hawkins, a British Army officer sent to repress New Morrock
- Adam Rind, Martha's cousin, and subsequently her husband
- Silas Rind, Martha's uncle
- Maddy Rind, Martha's aunt
- Joshua Rind, Silas' brother, he remains behind in New Morrock while the other men go to fight
- Sara Rind, Marta's cousin she ultimately saves young Harry after Martha's death

== Background ==
While Martha Peake and the town of New Morrock are complete inventions, McGrath does admit that the story of Harry and his relationship to Lord Drogo was inspired by the real life relationship between the anatomist John Hunter and Charles Byrne, the Irish 'Giant' whose skeleton can still be seen in the Hunterian Museum in Lincoln's Inn Fields.

Martha Peake is identified as a Gothic novel. McGath himself has stated "in this case I thought I had a chance to actually employ the Gothic in the most precise and proper way, because Gothic is a genre that concerns itself about time, and particularly the way that time both ruins things and also conceals things. I thought these attributes of the genre were perfectly suited to a novel that is to some extent questioning the historical method." Although, this adherence to the gothic form occurs to such a degree that it borders on parody or pastiche.

The key themes of the novel is the intersection between historical truth and national mythmaking.

== Reception ==
Barry Unsworth reviewed the work for The New York Times, writing that it "is an uneven novel, but it has rare qualities of power and urgency. I know that my imagination will be haunted for quite some time by the twisted figure of Harry Peake and the monstrous shadow of that great . . . hump." The Guardian praised the work, stating "Patrick McGrath has forged a Gothic gem, Martha Peake, out of the American Revolution - but don't trust either of the narrators".
