= Giants (Days Between Stations album) =

2020 album by Days Between Stations

Studio album by Days Between Stations
- Released: September 21, 2020
- Recorded: 2020
- Genre: Progressive rock, art rock
- Length: 60:10

Days Between Stations chronology
| 'In Extremis' (2013) | Giants (2020) |

Giants is the third full-length album by the Los Angeles, California-based band Days Between Stations

== Background ==
Giants is the third full-length album by the Los Angeles, California based progressive rock band Days Between Stations. It is co-produced by Billy Sherwood of YES, who also plays bass, drums, and handles lead vocals on most of the songs. Colin Moulding, who sang The Man Who Died Two Times on In Extremis, returns to sing on Goes By Gravity, while Durga McBroom, backup singer from Pink Floyd, sings lead on Witness the End of the World. A music video for this song will be released by fall of 2023.

== Reception ==
Giants won multiple album of the year awards as well as contender for the best album of the year. Music Street Journal included Giants on their list of the best albums of 2020, while Sonic Perspectives' Scott Medina wrote, "This is a band not to be missed."

== Track listing ==
All music written by Sepand Samzadeh and Oscar Fuentes. All lyrics written by Sepand Samzadeh, Oscar Fuentes and Billy Sherwood. Lyrics for "Goes by Gravity" written by Colin Moulding

1. "Spark of Life" – 16:53
2. "Witness the End of the World" – 3:57
3. "Another Day" – 9:38
4. "Goes by Gravity" – 4:51
5. "Giants" – 12:58
6. "The Gathering" – 4:07
7. "The Common Thread" – 7:46

== Personnel ==
- Sepand Samzadeh – synthesizer, guitar
- Oscar Fuentes – synthesizer, Piano, acoustic guitar

=== Additional players/artists ===
- Billy Sherwood (Drums and Lead Vocals)
- Colin Moulding (Lead Vocals on Goes by Gravity)
- Durga McBroom – Lead Vocals on "Witness the End of the World"
- Artwork and layout: Paul Whitehead
