= Asylum (2005 film) =

Drama film directed by David Mackenzie

- Original film poster
- Directed by: David Mackenzie
- Written by: Patrick Marber; Chrysanthy Balis
- Based on: Asylum by Patrick McGrath
- Produced by: Mace Neufeld; David E. Allen; Laurie Borg
- Starring: Natasha Richardson; Marton Csokas; Ian McKellen; Sean Harris
- Cinematography: Giles Nuttgens
- Edited by: Colin Monie; Steven Weisberg
- Music by: Mark Mancina
- Distributed by: Momentum Pictures
- Release date: 11 February 2005 (Berlin Film Festival)
- Running time: 99 minutes
- Countries: United Kingdom; Ireland
- Language: English
- Box office: $1.6 million

Asylum is a 2005 drama film directed by David Mackenzie and made by Mace Neufeld Productions, Samson Films, Seven Arts Pictures, Zephyr Films Ltd and released by Paramount Classics. It is based on the 1996 novel Asylum by Patrick McGrath and was adapted for the screen by Patrick Marber and Chrysanthy Balis.

It stars Natasha Richardson, Marton Csokas, Ian McKellen and Hugh Bonneville with a cast also including Sean Harris, Joss Ackland, Wanda Ventham, Maria Aitken and Judy Parfitt.

== Plot summary ==
Stella Raphael is the bored and unfulfilled wife of Max, a psychiatrist working at a remote mental asylum. Stella begins a passionate affair with Edgar, one of the patients. Edgar is particularly dangerous, having gruesomely murdered his wife in a jealous rage.

Undeterred by Edgar's violent past, Stella is beguiled by Edgar's passion and the affair intensifies. Although Max suspects nothing, Dr. Peter Cleave correctly guesses that the two are seeing each other. Cleave, who is fixated on Stella himself, attempts to get Edgar to admit to the affair—to no avail.

Edgar, who has been denied release, can take it no longer and breaks out of the asylum. Stella attempts to continue life without her lover, playing mother to her son, Charlie, and wife to Max. Around Christmas time, she receives a call from a friend of Edgar who arranges a rendezvous in London. The affair resumes with Stella using shopping trips as a pretext for her trips to the city. Edgar soon tires of the subterfuge—as well as sharing Stella's sexual attentions with Max—and demands that she choose to stay with him permanently or not return for another visit.

Shortly thereafter, Cleave confronts her, telling her that he knows that she has been going to London to see Edgar. After unsuccessfully attempting to bully Stella into revealing his whereabouts, Cleave reminds her that Max can have her committed to the hospital. Stella then runs away to join Edgar, and they begin a loose, somewhat bohemian life together, remaining out of the public eye for fear of the police.

Soon, the lust of the relationship begins to wear off and Stella begins to see a darker side to Edgar's personality. He becomes obsessed with his work, to Stella's chagrin. He also starts to become aggressive and violent towards her, intensifying her fear of him. After shopping one day, Stella returns to the pair's squalid studio flat to be found by police and taken back to her husband and son. Her husband struggles to forgive her but accepts that their son needs a mother figure. Edgar observes Stella's capture from the shadows and flees.

Max, who has lost his position at the hospital, accepts a new job and moves the family to Wales. Stella struggles to settle back into "normal" life with her family, trying especially hard to make amends with her son. Edgar tracks her down and a brief meeting with him results in his capture. This sends Stella further into her depressed and distracted state.

On a school outing with Charlie some weeks later, Stella takes her son away from the class teacher and other children and they go into the woods together. Stella perches on a rock while Charlie searches for fish in the river. He suddenly loses his footing, falling into the river and begins to drown. Not noticing, Stella remains in a trance, not moving to help him. The class teacher arrives and attempts to help him, but Charlie is already dead. Stella is anguished over this and following this trauma, her husband and Dr. Cleave decide that she needs to be institutionalised. She is taken to the same asylum where she met Edgar. Unknown to Stella, Edgar is still held there. With the help of constant medication and care, Stella gets 'better', though she never fully recovers. She accepts Dr. Cleave's offer of a stable relationship, much to his delight, after he informs her that Max wants a divorce.

At the annual ball, where male and female patients are permitted to socialise, Stella is anxious to share a dance with Edgar and desperately looks forward to seeing him. Unknown to her, Dr. Cleave prohibits Edgar from attending the ball, gloating that he and Stella are to be married. Dr. Cleave later informs Stella that Edgar will not be attending.

As a nurse escorts patients back to their rooms, Stella sneaks off up a stairway leading to the roof. Before anyone notices that she has gone missing, Stella jumps off of the roof tower to the courtyard below, but she does not die immediately. Dr. Cleave rushes to her aid, but she rejects his help saying "Leave me alone." He steps away from her, and she dies from her injuries a moment later.

In the final scene, Max visits the cemetery where Stella has been buried next to their son. He places a bouquet on Charlie's grave, removes one flower, and places it on the grave of his wife.

== Cast ==
- Natasha Richardson as Stella Raphael
- Marton Csokas as Edgar Stark
- Ian McKellen as Dr. Peter Cleave
- Hugh Bonneville as Dr. Max Raphael
- Sean Harris as Nick
- Judy Parfitt as Brenda Raphael
- Gus Lewis as Charlie
- Wanda Ventham as Mrs. Straffen
- Joss Ackland as Dr. Jack Straffen
- Maria Aitken as Claudia Greene
- Hazel Douglas as Lilly

== Production ==
Credited as an executive producer on the film, Natasha Richardson denied that this allowed her to dictate proceedings – even when it came to the numerous sex scenes. Richardson said David Mackenzie made it clear he wanted them to be as real as possible and that "what's in the movie compared to what they shot is the tip of the iceberg."

== Reception ==
=== Box office ===
Asylum grossed $375,403 in the United States and $1,268,960 in other countries for a worldwide total of $1,644,363.

=== Critical response ===
Asylum received mixed to negative reviews from critics. On Rotten Tomatoes, the film has an approval rating of 36%, based on 89 reviews, with an average rating of 5.9/10. The website's critical consensus reads: "This catastrophic adaption of Patrick McGrath's novel gets sillier and more implausible as it goes along." On Metacritic, the film has a weighted average of 51 out of 100, based on 29 critics, indicating "mixed or average reviews".

=== Accolades ===
| Association | Category | Recipient | Result | Ref |
|---|---|---|---|---|
| Berlin International Film Festival | Golden Berlin Bear | David Mackenzie | Nominated | |
| Berlin International Film Festival | Prize of the Guild of German Art House Cinemas | David Mackenzie | Won | |
| British Independent Film Awards | Best Actress | Natasha Richardson | Nominated | |
| Evening Standard British Film Awards | Best Actress | Natasha Richardson | Won | |
