= Arc d'X =

Book by Steve Erickson

- First edition
- Author: Steve Erickson
- Language: English
- Genre: Avant-pop
- Publisher: Poseidon Press
- Publication date: 1993
- Publication place: United States
- Media type: Print (Hardcover & Paperback)
- Pages: 299 pp
- ISBN: 0-671-74296-5
- Preceded by: Tours of the Black Clock
- Followed by: Amnesiascope

Arc d'X (1993), by Steve Erickson, is an avant-pop novel. Upon publication in 1993 it received wide attention particularly from other novelists such as Thomas Pynchon, Tom Robbins and William Gibson, and has been translated into Italian, Japanese and other languages.

== Plot summary ==
The story begins as a historical novel, telling the story of the relationship between Thomas Jefferson and his African-American mistress Sally Hemings, a young woman with a "skin that was too white to be quite black and too black to be quite white." Erickson focuses on the period Jefferson spent in France at the beginning of the French Revolution (in one of the climactic scenes of the first part there is a nightmarish description of the storming of the Bastille). After "Thomas" and Sally become lovers the couple returns to the United States, with Hemings remaining a slave even as her children are set free; this agreement between the lovers seems to have a powerful symbolic value for the rest of the novel, as "it was the nature of American freedom that he was only free to take pleasure in something he possessed."

An abrupt change in the narrative finds Hemings leaving Jefferson after he is elected President of the United States. In a departure from factual history, Hemings travels West, reaching a territory where Native Americans have never seen black or white people. There, in a room where a murder has taken place, Sally wakes in an alternate present when the United States have disappeared; the action is set in Aeonopolis, a strange city under harsh theocratic rule and built near a volcano on the West Coast of North-America (though there is no overt indication about the exact position of the city). Sally meets an Afro-American police detective named Wade who sets her free because he doesn't believe she is guilty of the murder, though the priests want her prosecuted. After a dramatic confrontation Wade deserts the police force and hides in the Arboretum, a vast subterranean construct beyond the jurisdiction of the Church and police where the illegal activity centers on a nightclub called Fleurs d'X and Wade becomes fascinated by a dancer named Mona.

The novel recounts Mona's relation with Wade, and Sally's relation with one of the archivists of Church Central, Etcher. The atmosphere is dream-like, both in the part of the novel focusing on Wade and in the longer part where the protagonist is Etcher. Etcher's tormented love story with Sally ends with her death, which takes place in an Icy region north of Aeonopolis where she and Etcher have escaped the police and church. After Sally's death the narration abruptly moves back to Paris and the present, where a French mathematician named Seuroq is stricken by unbearable grief for the death of his wife Helen; Seuroq begins to research a different concept of time, perhaps hoping to invert its flux. What he discovers instead is the existence of an extra day, called Jour d'X or X-Day, between December 31, 1999, and January 1, 2000.

Following this short episode the narrative focuses on a character named "Erickson" travelling towards Berlin in 1998. The city he reaches is not the real Berlin of the 1990s but an alternate version of the city which has been abandoned by many of its inhabitants notwithstanding the fall of the Wall, and which barely survives an unspecified disaster (while Erickson's home city, Los Angeles, has been obliterated by an unspecified Cataclysm, possibly an earthquake). Erickson is killed by a young nazi skinhead, Georgie Valis, the son of an East German professor who has attempted to escape to West Berlin; Georgie uses Erickson's passport to reach the United States and hitchhikes toward its ravaged West Coast. There he will meet in the ruins of Los Angeles Thomas and Sally, and this meeting will move him to the alternate universe of Aeonopolis, where he will reach the Fleurs d'X night club.

== Influence ==
Fleurs d'X is a collection of short musical pieces for solo classical guitar inspired by the novel and written by the Italian composer Fabio Selvafiorita.
