= Reassemblage (film) =

1982 film directed by Trinh T. Minh-ha

- Directed by: Trinh T. Minh-ha
- Produced by: Co-produced by Jean-Paul Bourdier and Trinh T. Minh-ha
- Release date: 1982
- Running time: 40 minutes
- Countries: Senegal; United States
- Language: English

Reassemblage is a 1982 film by Trinh T. Minh-ha, shot in Senegal picturing the dwellings and everyday life of the Sereer people.

== Production ==
The first film by the Vietnamese born filmmaker, writer, literary theorist, composer, and professor, Reassemblage focuses especially on the lives of the village women. Shot on 16mm film and released in 1982, the film challenges ethnographic documentary conventions (eg. National Geographic) and explores experimental ways of representing native culture. Minh-ha explains that she intends "not to speak about/Just speak nearby," unlike more conventional ethnographic documentary film. The film is a montage of fleeting images, sounds, and music from Senegal and includes no narration, although there are occasional statements by Trinh T. Minh-ha. None of the statements given by her assign meaning to the scenes, refusing to make the film "about" a "culture". It points to the viewers expectation and the need for the assignment of meaning.

== Content ==
Reassemblage does not follow a conventional plot, but rather presents sounds and visuals through non-linear montage. The film consists of a various shots capturing different landscapes, activities, animals, conversations, and people. The accompanying sounds include indigenous music, diegetic sounds and conversations, and a voiceover from Minh-ha. The voiceover does not provide narration or explanation of the scenes, but rather critical reflections on the filmmaking process and ethnographic documentary.
