= Trinh T. Minh-ha =

Vietnamese film maker

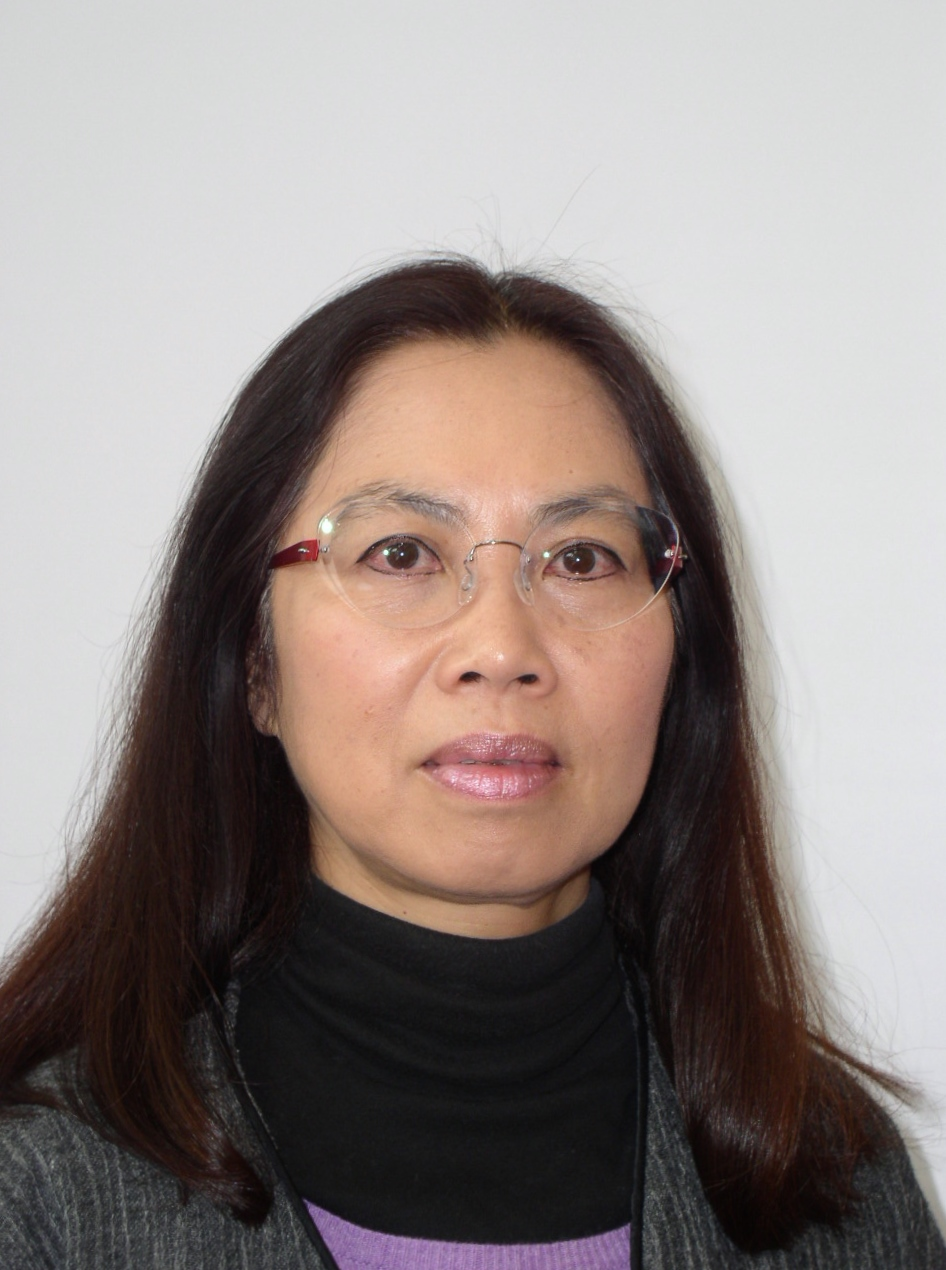
- Born: Trịnh Thị Minh Hà; Hanoi, Vietnam
- Education: University of Illinois Urbana-Champaign (PhD)
- Occupations: Filmmaker, writer, composer, professor, literary theorist
- Spouse: Jean-Paul Bourdier
- Website: trinhminh-ha.com

Trinh T. Minh-ha (born 1952 in Hanoi; Vietnamese: Trịnh Thị Minh Hà) is a Vietnamese filmmaker, writer, literary theorist, composer, and professor. She has been making films since the 1980s and is best known for her films Reassemblage and Surname Viet Given Name Nam. She has received several awards and grants, including the American Film Institute's Maya Deren Award, and fellowships from the John Simon Guggenheim Memorial Foundation, the National Endowment for the Arts, and the California Arts Council. Her films have been the subject of twenty retrospectives.

She is professor of Gender & Women's Studies and Rhetoric at the University of California, Berkeley. She teaches courses that focus on gender politics as related to cultural politics, post-coloniality, contemporary critical theory, and the arts. The seminars she offers focus on critical theory and research, cultural politics, feminist theory, Third Cinema, film theory and aesthetics, the Voice in social and creative contexts, and the autobiographical.

Her Vietnamese heritage as well as years of her life spent in West Africa, Japan, and the United States have informed Trinh's work, particularly her focus on cultural politics. While she does not locate herself as primarily Asian or American she also situates herself within the "whole context of Asia whose cultural heritages cut across national borderlines."

== Biography ==
Trinh T. Minh-ha was born in Hanoi, Vietnam. She was brought up in South Vietnam during the Vietnam War. She studied piano and music composition at the National Conservatory of Music and Theater in Saigon. Trinh migrated to the United States in 1970.

She studied music composition, ethnomusicology, and French literature at the University of Illinois Urbana-Champaign, where she received her Ph.D. degree in French and francophone literatures.

She has been a professor in the Gender and Women's Studies Department at the University of California, Berkeley since 1994 and in the Department of Rhetoric since 1997. She has also taught at Harvard University, Smith College, Cornell University, San Francisco State University, Ochanomizu University, and the National Conservatory of Music in Senegal.

In 2023, Trinh T. Min-ha's work was featured in the São Paulo Art Biennial. She presented her work alongside Jamaican artist Deborah Anzinger, American artist Torkwase Dyson, Cuban artist Wifredo Lam, Indian photographer Dayanita Singh, and other artists.

== Literary theory ==
Trinh's work in literary theory focuses on the themes of transcultural interactions, transitions, the production and perception of difference, and the intersection of technology and colonization. The influence that technology and cyberspace have had on the "making and unmaking of identity" has been the focus of her more recent works. She coined the term "inappropriate/d other" in the eighties, and it continues to factor in her work as both a filmmaker and critic due to its focus on liminal subjecthood.

As a Vietnamese person living in the United States, she explores finding an authentic voice for the Other, since all subjectivities are formed in discourse and shaped by the power and knowledge of discourse; for her, the discourse itself that produces truth must be questioned.

=== Woman, Native, Other: Writing Postcoloniality and Feminism (1989) ===
In Woman, Native, Other: Writing Postcoloniality and Feminism Trinh focuses her work on oral tradition; asserting a people's theory that is more inclusive. This method opens up an avenue for women of color to critique theory while creating new ways of knowing that are different from standard academic theory. Trinh proposes to the reader to unlearn received knowledge. In Chapter 1 she explores questions of language, writing, and oral tradition. She suggests being critical against "well-written," and knowing the difference between a "written-woman" and a "writing-woman." In the second chapter Trinh repudiates Western and male constructions of knowledge through anthropology. She argues that anthropology is the root of Western male hegemonic ideology that attempts to create a discourse of human truth. Mixed in with her stories and critiques are photographic images of women of color from Trinh's work in film. She includes stories of many other women of color such as Audre Lorde, Nellie Wong, and Gloria Anzaldua. Woman, Native, Other attempts to show how binary oppositions work to support patriarchal hegemonic ideology and how to approach it differently to avoid that.

=== When the Moon Waxes Red (1991) ===
When the Moon Waxes Red: Representation, Gender and Cultural Politics challenges feminist resistance to expand its terms to a multiply-marginalized subject to disrupt existing patriarchal ideology. The essays revolve around film theory, feminism, and Third World artists and critics. In the first section of the essays, Trinh argues that documentaries about Third World countries exist to propagate a First-World, subjective truth; Orientalism and patriarchy appear obscured in documentaries even while continuing to operate. In the second section of essays, Trinh questions other theorists and artists for confining the multi-hyphenated subject to certain categories. However, she also conceptualizes an interstitial space in which feminists of color can produce theory and criticism that question traditional gender and race politics. It is in this space that the Third World critic is simultaneously part of the culture and an outside observer. In the third section of essays, she advocates for a non-binary opposition of politics against dominant ideology. Trinh warns the reader to "solicit and sharpen awareness of how ideological patriarchy and hegemony work," especially when some artifacts still remain even within new representations of ideology.

=== Elsewhere, Within Here: Immigration Refugeeism and the Boundary Event (2010) ===
Elsewhere, Within Here is a collection of essays which examines the potential in intervals between spaces that interrupt boundaries and discursive dichotomies. Trinh focuses on lived experience, social contexts, and embodied histories.

Part I, "The Traveling Source", explores notions of home, migration, and belonging through an embodied experience of history, context, and hybridity. Part II, "Boundary Event: Between Refuse and Refuge", focuses on the politics of representation, multiple ways of knowing, and the possibilities that emerge through performance and other forms of creativity. Part III, "No End in Sight", illustrates the reproduction of systems of power and oppression, along with possibilities that enable their disruption, including creativity, storytelling, and learning.

=== Lovecidal (2016) ===
Lovecidal: Walking With the Disappeared, Trinh's book published in July 2016, is a meditation on the global state of endless war from U.S. military intervention in Iraq and Afghanistan to China's annexation of Tibet to racial violence in the United States and focuses on people's resistance to militarism and surveillance as well as social media's capacity to inform and mobilize. The book focuses on what Trinh describes as "the transient line between winning and losing," where conflicts are muddied and victories are neither clear nor objective, and the only clear victor is war itself. Though global militarism continues to thrive, potent forms of dissent have risen to confront it.

== Films ==
=== Reassemblage (40 mins, 1982) ===
Reassemblage is Trinh T. Minh-ha's first 16 mm film. It was filmed in Senegal and released in 1982. In Reassemblage, Minh-ha explains that she intends "not to speak about/Just speak nearby," unlike more conventional ethnographic film. The film is a montage of images from Senegal and includes no narration other than occasional statements by Trinh that never assign meaning to the scenes.

=== Naked Spaces: Living is Round (135 mins, 1985) ===
In Naked Spaces: Living Is Round, Trinh T. Minh-ha examines the themes of postcolonial identification and the geopolitical apparatus of disempowerment in Reassemblage to create an ethnographic essay-film on identity, the impossibility of translation, and space as a form of cultural representation. The montage of images point towards the economy of entertainment, which exoticizes images; exploited by the international community as justification for continued neocolonialism. Trinh's images re-present struggle and resistance to the mystification and exoticization of African life.

=== Surname Viet Given Name Nam (108 mins, 1989) ===
Surname Viet Given Name Nam is composed of newsreel and archival footage as well as printed information and features interviews with five contemporary Vietnamese women living in the U.S., as well as staged interviews with the same women reciting English language translations of interviews (originally published in French) with women in Vietnam. According to Trinh, the film "allows the practice of interviews to enter into the play of the true and the false, and the real and the staged." The film asks the viewer to consider issues such as plural identity, the fictions inherent in documentary techniques, and film as translation. Surname Viet Given Name Nam won the Blue Ribbon Award at the American Film and Video Festival.

=== Shoot for the Contents (102 mins, 1991) ===
The title of Shoot for the Contents refers in part to a Chinese guessing game and the documentary concept of getting to the truth. The film ponders questions of power and change, politics and culture, stemming from the 1989 Tiananmen Square protests. The film is layered with Chinese popular songs, classical music, sayings of Mao and Confucius, and other voices. The layering of images and sounds touch on themes Trinh addresses in earlier work on the multiplicity of identity and the politics of representation. The film's balance between omission and depiction and its play with colors and rhythm suggest interpretive shifts in contemporary Chinese culture and politics. This film won the Excellence in Cinematography (Documentary) Award from the Sundance Film Festival in 1992.

=== A Tale of Love (108 mins, 1995) ===
Trinh's tenth film, A Tale of Love is loosely based on the 19th century Vietnamese epic poetry The Tale of Kiều. The film tells the story of Vietnamese immigrant Kieu, a freelance writer who is struggling between the conflicting demands of a new life in America, the family she left behind, and her own ambitions. This was Trinh's first feature film shot in 35 mm film.

=== The Fourth Dimension (87 mins, 2001) ===
The Fourth Dimension is Trinh's first digital video feature. It is an exploration of time through rituals of new technology, daily life, and conventional traditions. The film attempts to show "the expansive reality of Japan as an image and as time-light." It consists of a travelogue of images through Japan, ritualizing the journey into where the actual and virtual meet.

=== Night Passage (98 mins, 2004) ===
Night Passage is an experimental digital feature. Inspired by Kenji Miyazawa's Milky Way Railroad, it follows three young friends as they travel on a train between life and death. Trinh and co-director and producer Jean Paul Bourdier explore dreamscapes through the train window. Trinh explains her interest in digital production as a matter of engagement with speed and new ways of seeing: "the question is not so much to produce a new image as to provoke, to facilitate, and to solicit a new seeing." Night Passage meditates on liminal space and identities as well as processes of digital cinematography.

=== Forgetting Vietnam (90 mins, 2015) ===
Forgetting Vietnam, is a lyrical essay that combines myths, performance, images of contemporary Vietnamese life, and explorations of cultural memory. Building off the elements that form the Vietnamese term "country" as existing between land and water, Forgetting Vietnam explores how local inhabitants, immigrants, and veterans understand and remember. A conversation between myth and the 40th anniversary of the Vietnam War persists throughout the film. The film was shot in 1995 on Hi8 and in 2012 in both high-definition and standard-definition video. The different formats are edited together to create a questioning of the concepts of linear time and progress.

=== What About China? (135 mins, 2022) ===
What About China? is a reflection on the complex history of China as well as film as a medium. Trinh goes back to the materials she shot in southern and eastern China in the early 1990s. What About China? attempts to delve beneath the surface of everyday assumptions about the country which are based on media coverage and official narratives.

== Publications ==
- Un art sans oeuvre, ou, l'anonymat dans les arts contemporains (International Book Publishers, 1981)
- African Spaces: Designs for Living in Upper Volta (with Jean Paul Bourdier, Holmes & Meier, 1985)
- En minuscules (book of poems, Edition Le Meridien, 1987)
- Woman, Native, Other: Writing postcoloniality and feminism (Indiana University Press, 1989)
  - German edition (translated by Kathrina Menke, Verlag Turia & Kant, 2010)
  - Japanese edition (translated by Kazuko Takemura, Iwanami Shoten, 1995)
- Out There: Marginalisation in Contemporary Culture (co-edited with Cornel West, R. Ferguson, and M. Gever, New Museum and MIT Press, 1990)
- “Documentary Is/Not a Name” (October, vol. 52, 1990)
- When the Moon Waxes Red: Representation, gender and cultural politics (Routledge, 1991)
  - Japanese edition (translated by Fukuko Kobayashi, Misuzu Publishers, 1996)
- Framer Framed (Routledge, 1992)
- Drawn from African Dwellings (with Jean Paul Bourdier, Indiana University Press, 1996)
- Cinema Interval (Routledge, 1999)
- Trinh T. Minh-ha (Vienna Secession, 2001)
- The Digital Film Event (Routledge, 2005)
- Habiter un monde (with Jean Paul Bourdier, Editions Alternatives, 2005)
  - English edition: Vernacular Architecture in West Africa: A World in Dwelling (with Jean Paul Bourdier, Routledge, 2011)
- Elsewhere, Within Here: Immigration, Refugeeism and the Boundary Event (Routledge, 2011)
  - Swedish edition: Nagon annanstans, har inne (translated by Goran Dahlberg and Elin Talji, Glänta, 2012)
  - Japanese edition (translated by Fukuko Kobayashi, Heibonsha, 2013)
- D-Passage: The Digital Way (Duke University Press, 2013)
- Lovecidal: Walking with the Disappeared (Fordham University Press, 2016)

== Installations ==
- Old Land New Waters (2007, Okinawa Prefectural Museum; 2008, Chechnya Emergency Biennale; 2008, Third Guangzhou Art Triennale; 2009, Okinawa Prefectural Museum)
- L'Autre marche (with Jean Paul Bourdier, 2006, Musée du Quai Branly)
- Bodies of the Desert (2005, Gallery Blu, Santa Clara)
- The Desert is Watching (with Jean Paul Bourdier, 2003, Kyoto Art Biennale)
- Nothing But Ways (with Lynn Marie Kirby, 1999, Yerba Buena Center for the Arts, San Francisco)
- Photo-montage (1995, San Francisco State University)

== Music ==
- Poems. For percussion ensemble. Premiered by the University of Illinois Urbana-Champaign Percussion Ensemble, directed by Denis Wiziecki, 9 April 1976.
- Four Pieces for Electronic Music. 1975 performances at the University of Illinois.
