= In Extremis (Days Between Stations album) =

Studio album by Days Between Stations
- Released: May 15, 2013
- Recorded: 2012–2013
- Genre: Progressive rock, art rock
- Length: 1:09:38

Days Between Stations chronology
Days Between Stations (2007)	In Extremis (2013)	Giants (2020)

In Extremis is the second full-length album by the Los Angeles, California based progressive rock band Days Between Stations. In Extremis is a concept album about a man at the point of death. The title "In Extremis" refers to the Latin term "In extremity" – A term used in reference to the last illness prior to death.

The album contains one of the last studio performances by former Yes guitarist Peter Banks.

The album was listed in SomethingElseReviews.com's list of "top 10" Progressive Rock albums of 2013.

In early 2014, the band released "In Extremis" in the vinyl format as a 2LP gatefold with 2 versions: a limited edition colored vinyl (50 units) and a larger edition in black vinyl (450 units).

In June 2014, the band released their first music video for the track "The Man Who Died Two Times" from the album, featuring Colin Moulding of XTC on lead vocals.

== Track listing ==
All music written by Sepand Samzadeh and Oscar Fuentes. All lyrics written by Sepand Samzadeh, Oscar Fuentes and Billy Sherwood.

1. "No Cause For Alarm" – 3:51
2. "In Utero" – 5:10
3. "Visionary" – 10:40
4. "Blackfoot" – 10:06
5. "The Man Who Died Two Times" – 4:12
6. "Waltz In E Minor" – 2:06
7. "Eggshell Man" – 11:58
8. "In Extremis" - 21.38
  1. Part I: Mass
  2. Part II: On The Ground
  3. Part III: A Requiem
  4. Part IV: Writing on Water
  5. Part V: Overland
  6. Part VI: Traveler

== Personnel ==
- Sepand Samzadeh – synthesizer, guitar
- Oscar Fuentes – synthesizer, Piano, acoustic guitar

=== Additional Players/Artists ===
- Peter Banks (2nd Lead & Rhythm Guitar on Eggshell Man, In Extremis)
- Matt Bradford (Dobro on Visionary)
- Tony Levin (Bass on all tracks)
- Colin Moulding (Lead Vocals on The Man Who Died Two Times)
- Ali Nouri (Tar solo on Eggshell Man)
- Jeffery Samzadeh (Sonati Vocals on In Extremis)
- Billy Sherwood (Drums and Lead Vocals)
- Rick Wakeman (Keyboard Solo on Eggshell Man)
- The Barbershop Quartet (Pat Claypool, Matt Gray, Eric Orr, David Rakita on In Extremis)
- Chris Tedesco & The Angel City Orchestra (No Cause for Alarm, In Utero, Visionary, Waltz in E Minor, In Extremis)
- Artwork & Layout: Paul Whitehead
