= Spider (2002 film) =

- Theatrical release poster
- Directed by: David Cronenberg
- Screenplay by: Patrick McGrath
- Based on: Spider by Patrick McGrath
- Produced by: David Cronenberg; Samuel Hadida; Catherine Bailey
- Starring: Ralph Fiennes; Miranda Richardson; Gabriel Byrne
- Cinematography: Peter Suschitzky
- Edited by: Ronald Sanders
- Music by: Howard Shore
- Production companies: Catherine Bailey Ltd.; Grosvenor Park Productions; Davis Films
- Distributed by: Odeon Films (Canada); Helkon SK (United Kingdom)
- Release dates: 13 December 2002 (Canada); 3 January 2003 (United Kingdom)
- Running time: 98 minutes
- Countries: Canada; United Kingdom
- Language: English
- Budget: $10 million
- Box office: $5.8 million

Spider is a 2002 psychological thriller film produced and directed by David Cronenberg and based on the 1990 novel of the same name by Patrick McGrath, who also wrote the screenplay.

The film premiered at the 2002 Cannes Film Festival and enjoyed some media buzz; however, it was released in only a few cinemas at the year's end by distributor Sony Pictures Classics. Nonetheless, the film enjoyed much acclaim by critics and especially by Cronenberg enthusiasts. The film garnered a Best Director Award at the Canadian Genie Awards. The stars of the film, Ralph Fiennes and particularly Miranda Richardson, received several awards for their work in the film.

== Plot ==
Dennis Cleg is a schizophrenic man who has just been released from a mental institution. Known as "Spider", he is given a room in a halfway house catering to mentally disturbed people which is run by unrelenting landlady Mrs. Wilkinson. While in his new abode, Spider starts piecing together his memory of an apparently fateful childhood event.

Roaming the nearby derelict urban area and the local canal, Spider starts to relive a period of his childhood in 1950s London with his mother Mrs. Cleg and unfaithful father Bill. Here, Spider witnesses Bill murder his mother by hitting her on the head with a spade with the passive support of his mistress, a prostitute named Yvonne. Much to Spider's horror, she moves into the house and is presented as his "mother".

Now grown up, Spider begins seeing Mrs. Wilkinson turn into Yvonne. He responds by using strands of yarn to form a web-like construction in his room, and steals Wilkinson's keys to gain access to different rooms.

Meanwhile, Spider begins to relive a memory from childhood where he kills Yvonne by using a similar web-like pulley mechanism to turn on the gas in the kitchen. However, it appears to show Mrs. Cleg lying dead instead, implying it really was his mother all along, and Yvonne was actually a delusion.

Spider comes to this realization when he sneaks late one night into Mrs. Wilkinson's room, still seeing her alternatively as the mistress, and appears ready to kill her, but backs away after she turns back to normal. He is then taken back to the asylum after she reports him.

== Cast ==
- Ralph Fiennes as Dennis "Spider" Cleg
  - Bradley Hall as young Dennis "Spider" Cleg
- Miranda Richardson as Yvonne / Mrs. Cleg
- Gabriel Byrne as Bill Cleg
- John Neville as Terrence
- Lynn Redgrave as Mrs. Wilkinson

== Production ==
During a Q&A session at the Kodak Lecture Series in May 2005, Cronenberg revealed that neither he, Fiennes, Richardson, nor the producers received any sort of salary during the shooting of the film. All chose to waive their salaries, so the money could be used to bankroll the under-funded production.

== Release and reception ==
The film premiered at the 2002 Cannes Film Festival.

=== Critical response ===
Review aggregation website Rotten Tomatoes gives the film a score of 85% based on reviews from 136 critics. The site's critical consensus reads "Ralph Fiennes is brilliant in this accomplished and haunting David Cronenberg film." On Metacritic, the film had an average score of 83 out of 100, based on 35 reviews.

Roger Ebert gave the film 3/4 stars, writing, "The details of the film and of the performances are meticulously realized; there is a reward in seeing artists working so well. But the story has no entry or exit, and is cold, sad and hopeless. Afterward, I feel more admiration than gratitude." Nev Pierce from the BBC awarded the film 3/5 stars, calling it "dour, thoughtful, and oppressive". Stephen Holden from New York Times praised the film, calling it "as harrowing a portrait of one man's tormented isolation as the commercial cinema has produced." Peter Travers of Rolling Stone awarded the film 3.5 out of 4 stars, writing, "What catches us in Spider‘s web — besides the indelible performances of Fiennes and Richardson — is the director’s sympathy with this freak man-child who struggles to order his confused memories into a kind of truth. That’s what makes Cronenberg a world-class provocateur: His movie gets under your skin." Peter Bradshaw of The Guardian rated the film 4/5 stars, calling it "an intensely controlled, beautifully designed and fascinatingly acted account of Patrick McGrath's original novel". Mike Clark from USA Today awarded the film 3/4 stars, commending the film's direction, cinematography, and performances, while also stating that it was not particularly "sizzling" as in his previous films The Fly and eXistenZ.

=== Awards ===
The film won a Genie Award for Best Director; the TIFF award for Best Canadian Feature; and the TFCA award for Best Canadian Film. In addition, the film won the Georges Delerue Award for Best Soundtrack/Sound Design at Film Fest Gent in 2002.

It was mentioned in the 2002 Sight & Sound poll by Amy Taubin, who ranked it at 10th.

== Works cited ==
- Mathijs, Ernest (2008). The Cinema of David Cronenberg: From Baron of Blood to Cultural Hero. Wallflower Press. ISBN 9781905674657.
