= Days Between Stations (album) =

Studio album by Days Between Stations
- Released: 2007
- Recorded: 2003–2007
- Genre: Progressive rock, art rock
- Length: 56:20
- Label: Bright Orange

Days Between Stations chronology
Days Between Stations (2007)	In Extremis (2013)

Days Between Stations is the first and self-titled album by the Los Angeles, California based progressive rock band Days Between Stations.

== Critical reception ==
Days Between Stations received positive reviews from publications such as Progression Magazine, The Prog Files, and Gnosis.

== Track listing ==
All music and lyrics were written by Sepand Samzadeh and Oscar Fuentes.

1. "Requiem for the Living" – 13:26
2. "Either/Or" – 7:33
3. "Intermission 1" – 2:13
4. "How to Seduce a Ghost" – 4:55
5. "Radio Song" – 4:24
6. "Intermission 2" – 1:36
7. "Laudanum" – 22:14
  1. Part I "A long goodbye"
  2. Part II "Every One is here but You"
  3. Part III "Nowhere"
  4. Part IV "The Wake"

== Personnel ==
- Sepand Samzadeh – synthesizer, guitar
- Oscar Fuentes – synthesizer, acoustic guitar

Additional musicians

- Jon Mattox – drums, percussion
- Hollie – vocals
- Jeffery Samzadeh – vocals
- Vivi Rama – bass guitar
- Jason Hemmens – saxophone
- Sean Erick – trumpet
- Kevin Williams – trombone
- Jeremy Castillo – additional guitars
- Marjory Fuentes – voice
