= Ursula Hegi =

German-born American writer (1946–2026)

- Born: Ursula Johanna Koch; May 23, 1946; Büderich, Düsseldorf, Rhine Province, Allied-occupied Germany
- Died: July 27, 2026 (aged 80); Sag Harbor, New York, U.S.
- Education: University of New Hampshire
- Occupation: Writer

Ursula Johanna Hegi (née Koch; May 23, 1946 – July 27, 2026) was a German-born American writer. She was an instructor in the MFA program in creative writing at Stony Brook Southampton.

== Life and career ==
Ursula Johanna Koch was born on May 23, 1946, in Büderich, a suburb of Düsseldorf, Germany, a city that was heavily bombed during World War II. Her perception growing up was that the war was avoided as a topic of discussion despite its evidence everywhere, and the Holocaust was a particularly taboo topic. This had a strong effect on her later writing and her feelings about her German identity.

She left West Germany in 1964, at the age of 18. She moved to the United States in 1965, where she married (becoming Ursula Hegi) in 1967 and became a naturalized citizen the same year. In 1979, she graduated from the University of New Hampshire with both a bachelor's and master's degree. She was divorced in 1984. The same year, she was hired at Eastern Washington University, in Cheney, Washington, near Spokane, where she became an Associate Professor and taught creative writing and contemporary literature.

Hegi's first books were set in the United States. She set her third, Floating in My Mother's Palm, in the fictional German town of Burgdorf, using her writing to explore her conflicted feelings about her German heritage. She used the setting for three more books, including her best selling novel Stones from the River, which was chosen for Oprah's Book Club in 1997. Hegi appeared on The Oprah Winfrey Show on April 8 of that year, and her publisher reprinted 1.5 million hardcover copies and 500,000 paperbacks. She subsequently moved from Spokane to New York State.

Her many awards included an NEA Fellowship and five PEN Syndicated Fiction Awards. She won a book award from the Pacific Northwest Booksellers Association (PNBA) in 1991 for Floating in My Mother's Palm. She also had two New York Times Notable Book mentions. She wrote many book reviews for The New York Times, the Los Angeles Times, and The Washington Post.

Hegi died in Sag Harbor, New York, on July 27, 2026, at the age of 80.

== Bibliography ==
=== Novels ===
- Intrusions (1981)
- Floating in My Mother's Palm (1990)
- Stones from the River (1994)
- Salt Dancers (1995)
- The Vision of Emma Blau (2000)
- Sacred Time (2003)
- The Worst Thing I've Done (2007)
- Children and Fire (2011)
- The Patron Saint of Pregnant Girls (2020)

=== Short stories ===
- Unearned Pleasures and Other Stories (1988)
- Hotel of the Saints (2001)

=== Children's books ===
- Trudi & Pia (2003), with pictures by Gisele Potter

=== Non-fiction ===
- Tearing the Silence: On Being German in America (1998)
