= Kazuko Takemura =

Japanese scholar of English literature (1954–2011)

Kazuko Takemura (February 3, 1954 – December 13, 2011) was a Japanese scholar of English literature. Her areas of expertise included Anglo-American literature, critical theory, film studies, and feminist thought. She was a former professor at Ochanomizu University. Takemura translated the works of Judith Butler and Trinh T. Minh-ha, among others, significantly contributing to the development of feminist theory and thought in Japan.

== Biography ==
Takemura graduated from the Faculty of Education at Ochanomizu University. She then completed a master's program at Ochanomizu University and later withdrew from the doctoral program at the University of Tsukuba.

In 1982, she began her academic career as an assistant at Kagawa University’s Faculty of Education. She was promoted to associate professor in 1985. After serving as an associate professor at Seikei University and the University of Tsukuba, she joined Ochanomizu University in April 1996.

In 2003, she earned a Doctor of Humanities degree from Ochanomizu University with her dissertation, On Love: The Politics of Identity and Desire.

On December 13, 2011, she died from a malignant tumor at the age of 57.

== Research and translation ==
As a literary scholar, film studies researcher, and feminist thinker, Takemura published works such as Feminism and On Love during her lifetime. Additionally, three volumes of her collected works were published posthumously.

Her research aimed to deconstruct the category of "woman" through critiques of heterosexism, expanding feminism beyond its conventional focus on "women" as a given category.

Takemura translated the works of Judith Butler, Gayatri Chakravorty Spivak, and Trinh T. Minh-ha into Japanese. Following her death, they published eulogies.

== Selected works ==
=== Books ===
- Feminism. Iwanami Shoten, 2000. ISBN 978-4-00-026432-7 / Iwanami Gendai Bunko, 2024. ISBN 978-4-00-600478-1
- On Love: The Politics of Identity and Desire. Iwanami Shoten, 2002. ISBN 978-4-00-022011-8 / Iwanami Gendai Bunko, 2021. ISBN 978-4-00-600441-5
- The Challenge of Literary Power: Family, Desire, and Terrorism. Kenkyusha, 2012. ISBN 978-4-327-48161-2
- What Is She Looking At?: The Deep Layers of Visual Representation and Desire. Edited by Kiyomi Kono and Keiko Nitta, Sakuhinsha, 2012. ISBN 978-4-86182-418-0
- Subverting Boundaries: Sex, Life, and Violence. Iwanami Shoten, 2013. ISBN 978-4-00-022597-7

=== Translations ===
- Nathaniel Hawthorne, The Great Stone Face. Co-translated with Masayuki Sakemoto, Kokushokankokai (Babel Library Series), 1988. ISBN 978-4-336-02558-6
- Trinh T. Minh-ha, Woman, Native, Other: Postcolonialism and Feminism. Iwanami Shoten, 1995. ISBN 978-4-00-002950-6 / Iwanami Humanities Selection, 2011. ISBN 978-4-00-028514-8
- Peter B. High, An Outline of American Literature (Longman Edition). Co-translated with Iwao Iwamoto, Kirihara Shoten, 1995. ISBN 978-4-342-76060-0
- John Barth, Letters (2 volumes). Co-translated with Iwao Iwamoto, Kokushokankokai (Adventures in Literature Series), 2000. Vol. 1: ISBN 978-4-336-03578-3 / Vol. 2: ISBN 978-4-336-03579-0
- Sophia Phoca and Rebecca Wright, Illustrated Introduction to "Post" Feminism. Co-translated with Kiyomi Kono, Sakuhinsha, 2003. ISBN 978-4-87893-561-9
- Sara Salih, Judith Butler. Co-translated, Seidosha (Modern Thought Guidebook Series), 2005. ISBN 978-4-7917-6225-5
- Gayatri C. Spivak, Spivak Speaks in Japan. Supervised by Tetsu Ukai, co-translated with Tetsuya Motohashi, Keiko Nitta, and Asako Nakai, Misuzu Shobo, 2009. ISBN 978-4-622-07447-2
- Gender Trouble: Feminism and the Subversion of Identity. Seidosha, 1999. ISBN 978-4-7917-5703-9 / New Edition, 2018. ISBN 978-4-7917-7047-2
- Contingency, Hegemony, Universality: Contemporary Dialogues on the Left. Co-authored by Ernesto Laclau and Slavoj Žižek, co-translated with Toshikatsu Murayama, Seidosha, 2002. ISBN 978-4-7917-5957-6 / New Edition, 2019. ISBN 978-4-7917-7188-2
- Antigone’s Claim: Kinship Between Life and Death. Seidosha, 2002. ISBN 978-4-7917-6013-8
- Excitable Speech: A Politics of the Performative. Iwanami Shoten, 2004. ISBN 978-4-00-023392-7 / Iwanami Humanities Selection, 2015. ISBN 978-4-00-028813-2
- Who Sings the Nation-State?: Language, Politics, Belonging. Co-authored by Gayatri C. Spivak, Iwanami Shoten, 2008.
- Bodies That Matter: On the Discursive Limits of "Sex". Supervised by Yoshiyuki Sato, co-translated with Hiromi Ochi, Kiyomi Kono, and Reiichi Miura, Ibunsha, 2021. ISBN 978-4-7531-0362-1
