= The Grotesque (film) =

- Promotional poster
- Directed by: John-Paul Davidson
- Written by: Patrick McGrath (novel and screenplay)
- Produced by: Stephen Evans; John Kay; Trudie Styler
- Starring: Alan Bates; Lena Headey; Theresa Russell; Sting
- Cinematography: Andrew Dunn
- Edited by: Tariq Anwar
- Music by: Anne Dudley
- Distributed by: Live Entertainment (U.S.)
- Release date: 9 September 1995 (TIFF)
- Running time: 99 minutes
- Country: United Kingdom
- Language: English

The Grotesque (also known as Grave Indiscretion and Gentlemen Don't Eat Poets) is a 1995 British film by John-Paul Davidson, adapted from the 1989 novel of the same name by Patrick McGrath. It stars Alan Bates, Lena Headey, Theresa Russell and Sting.

Costume Designer Colleen Atwood worked on the film, and McGrath's wife, actress Maria Aitken, performed in a supporting role.

== Plot ==
Eccentric paleontologist Sir Hugo has little interest in his wife, Lady Harriet, but the new butler, Fledge, gives her the attention she needs. Hugo dislikes his daughter Cleo's fiancé, aspiring poet Sidney, and Sidney's subsequent disappearance places the household in further turmoil.

== Cast ==
- Alan Bates as Sir Hugo Coal
- Theresa Russell as Lady Harriet Coal
- Sting as Fledge
- Lena Headey as Cleo Coal
- Jim Carter as George Lecky
- Anna Massey as Mrs. Giblet
- Trudie Styler as Doris
- Maria Aitken as Lavinia Freebody
- James Fleet as Inspector Limp
- Steven Mackintosh as Sidney Giblet
- John Mills as Sir Edward Cleghorn
- Annette Badland as Connie Babblehump
- Bob Goody as Father Pim

== Release ==
The film was released under the title Gentlemen Don't Eat Poets in the United States, and later its US video title was Grave Indiscretion. It is also known as Butler morden leiser in Germany, Grotesco in Portugal, and Perverso in Spain.

The film is available on Region 2 DVD (as The Grotesque) and VHS (Grave Indiscretion) only, though both versions are out of print.

== Reception ==
Nathan Rabin of The A.V. Club called the film "predictable", noting its "lack of substance" and that "Bates and Russell deliver amusingly over-the-top performances...but Sting and Styler give wooden performances that make their characters seem not so much eerie and mysterious as heavily sedated."
