= Natasha Richardson =

British actress (1963–2009)

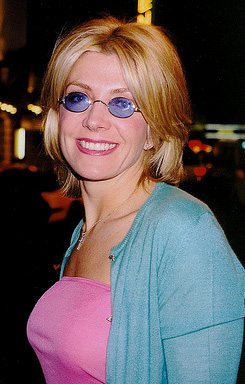
- Richardson in 1999
- Born: Natasha Jane Richardson; 11 May 1963; London, England
- Died: 18 March 2009 (aged 45); New York City, US
- Resting place: St. Peter's Episcopal Cemetery, Lithgow, New York, US
- Education: Royal Central School of Speech and Drama
- Occupation: Actress
- Years active: 1968–2009
- Spouses: Robert Fox (m. 1990; div. 1992); Liam Neeson (m. 1994)
- Children: 2, including Micheál
- Parents: Tony Richardson (father); Vanessa Redgrave (mother)
- Relatives: Joely Richardson (sister); Franco Nero (stepfather); Daisy Bevan (niece); Carlo Gabriel Nero (half-brother); Lynn Redgrave (aunt); Jemma Redgrave (cousin)
- Family: Redgrave

Natasha Jane Richardson (11 May 1963 – 18 March 2009) was an English actress. A member of the Redgrave family, she was a daughter of actress Vanessa Redgrave and director-producer Tony Richardson and a granddaughter of Michael Redgrave and Rachel Kempson. She was married to Liam Neeson.

Early in her career, Richardson portrayed Mary Shelley in Ken Russell's Gothic (1986) and Patty Hearst in the eponymous 1988 biopic film directed by Paul Schrader. She appeared in The Handmaid's Tale (1990). She received critical acclaim and a Theatre World Award for her Broadway debut in the 1993 revival of Anna Christie. Richardson also appeared in Nell (1994), The Parent Trap (1998), Maid in Manhattan (2002), and The White Countess (2005).

For playing Sally Bowles in the 1998 Broadway revival of Cabaret, she won the Tony Award for Best Actress in a Musical, the Drama Desk Award for Outstanding Actress in a Musical and the Outer Critics Circle Award.

Richardson died in March 2009 at age 45 from a head injury after a skiing accident in Quebec.

== Early life ==
Natasha Jane Richardson was born on 11 May 1963 in Marylebone, London, a member of the Redgrave family, known as a theatrical and film acting dynasty. She was a daughter of director and producer Tony Richardson and actress Vanessa Redgrave, granddaughter of actors Sir Michael Redgrave and Rachel Kempson, sister of Joely Richardson, half-sister of Carlo Gabriel Nero and Katharine Grimond Hess, niece of actress Lynn Redgrave and actor Corin Redgrave, and cousin of Jemma Redgrave.

Richardson's parents divorced in 1967. The following year, she made her film debut at age four in an uncredited role in The Charge of the Light Brigade, directed by her father.

Richardson was educated in London at two private schools, the Lycée Français Charles de Gaulle in South Kensington and St. Paul's Girls' School in Hammersmith, before going on to study acting at the Central School of Speech and Drama.

== Career ==
=== Theatre ===
Richardson began her career in regional theatre at Leeds Playhouse, and in 1984 at the Open Air Theatre in London's Regent's Park, when she appeared in A Midsummer Night's Dream with Ralph Fiennes and Richard E. Grant. Her first professional work in London's West End was in a revival of Anton Chekhov's The Seagull in 1985. This production also featured her mother, Vanessa Redgrave. Soon afterward, Richardson starred in a London stage production of High Society, adapted from the Cole Porter film.

Richardson made her Broadway debut in 1993 in the title role of Anna Christie, which is where she met future husband Liam Neeson. She was nominated for a Tony Award for Best Actress in a Play at the 47th Tony Awards for that role.

In 1998, Richardson played the role of Sally Bowles in Sam Mendes's revival of Cabaret on Broadway, for which she won the Tony Award for Best Actress in a Musical at the 52nd Tony Awards. The following year, Richardson returned to Broadway in Closer, for which she was nominated for the Drama Desk Award for Outstanding Featured Actress in a Play, and in 2005 she appeared again with the Roundabout, this time as Blanche DuBois in the revival of Tennessee Williams's A Streetcar Named Desire, opposite John C. Reilly as Stanley Kowalski. In January 2009, two months before her death, Richardson played the role of Desirée Armfeldt in a concert production of Stephen Sondheim's A Little Night Music, with her mother Vanessa Redgrave, who played Madame Armfeldt. At the time of Richardson's death, the pair were preparing to co-star in a Broadway revival of the musical.

=== Film ===
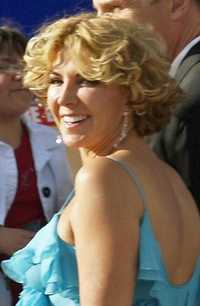
Richardson in 2008

In 1984, Richardson made her first credited screen appearance as an art tutor in the James Scott-directed Every Picture Tells A Story, based on the early life of the painter William Scott. She later starred as Mary Shelley in the 1986 film Gothic, a fictionalised account of the author's creation of Frankenstein. The following year, Richardson starred with Kenneth Branagh and Colin Firth in A Month in the Country, directed by Pat O'Connor. Director Paul Schrader signed Richardson for the title role of Patty Hearst in the 1988 docudrama film Patty Hearst about the heiress and her kidnapping. Richardson's performances with Robert Duvall and Faye Dunaway in The Handmaid's Tale and Christopher Walken, Rupert Everett and Helen Mirren in The Comfort of Strangers (directed by Schrader) won her the 1990 Evening Standard British Film Award for Best Actress. In 1991, Richardson appeared in The Favour, the Watch and the Very Big Fish with Bob Hoskins. He later credited her with giving him the best kiss of his life during the film. Hoskins stated, "She got hold of me and kissed me like I've never been kissed before. I was gobsmacked."

Richardson was named Best Actress at the 1994 Karlovy Vary International Film Festival for Widows' Peak and that same year appeared in Nell with Jodie Foster and future husband Liam Neeson. She appeared in the Disney film remake The Parent Trap in 1998 alongside Dennis Quaid, as Elizabeth James, the divorced mother of Lindsay Lohan's characters Hallie Parker and Annie James. Additional film credits include Blow Dry (2001), Chelsea Walls (2001), Waking Up in Reno (2002), Maid in Manhattan (2002), Asylum (2005), which won Richardson a second Evening Standard Award for Best Actress, The White Countess (2005), and Evening (2007). Her last screen appearance was as Mrs. Kingsley, the headmistress of a girls' school in the 2008 comedy Wild Child. During the last week of January 2009, Richardson recorded her offscreen role as Ruth Mallory, the wife of climber George Mallory, who disappeared while climbing Mount Everest during a 1924 expedition, in the 2010 documentary film The Wildest Dream, for which Liam Neeson provided narration.

=== Television ===
Richardson made her American television debut in a small role in the 1984 miniseries Ellis Island. That same year, she made her British television debut in an episode of the BBC series Oxbridge Blues. The following year, she appeared as Violet Hunter with Jeremy Brett and David Burke in The Adventures of Sherlock Holmes in the episode entitled "The Copper Beeches." Richardson starred with Judi Dench, Michael Gambon and Kenneth Branagh in a 1987 BBC adaptation of the Henrik Ibsen play Ghosts; with Maggie Smith and Rob Lowe in a 1993 BBC adaptation of Suddenly, Last Summer by Tennessee Williams; as Zelda Fitzgerald in the 1993 television movie Zelda; Haven (2001) on CBS and The Mastersons of Manhattan (2007) on NBC. Richardson appeared as a celebrity judge on Top Chef, season 5.

== Personal life ==
Richardson's first marriage was to filmmaker Robert Fox, whom she had met in 1985, during the making of Anton Chekhov's The Seagull; they were married from 1990 to 1992. Richardson then met actor Liam Neeson while performing in a revival of the play Anna Christie on Broadway in 1993. She married Neeson in the summer of 1994 at the home they shared in Millbrook, New York; she had become a naturalised American citizen. The couple had two sons together: Micheál and Daniel.

Richardson helped raise millions of dollars in the fight against AIDS; her father, Tony, had died of AIDS-related causes in 1991. She was also actively involved in AmfAR, becoming a board member in 2006 and participating in many other AIDS charities, including Bailey House, God's Love We Deliver, Mothers' Voices, AIDS Crisis Trust and National AIDS Trust, for which Richardson was an ambassador. She received AmfAR's Award of Courage in November 2000.

Richardson was a smoker. Although she had reportedly quit smoking, she was a critic of the ban on smoking in New York City restaurants.

== Death and funeral ==
On 16 March 2009, Richardson sustained a head injury after falling during a beginner skiing lesson at the Mont Tremblant Resort, approximately 130 kilometres (81 mi) from Montreal. Initially, she declined medical assistance but reported a severe headache about two hours later. She was initially treated at the Hôpital du Sacré-Cœur de Montréal in Montreal, where she was in intensive care. Before being flown to New York City, it was reported she had suffered brain death. She was subsequently flown to Lenox Hill Hospital in New York City, where she died two days later, aged 45, from an epidural hematoma.

Richardson's family issued a statement on the day of her death: "Liam Neeson, his sons, and the entire family are shocked and devastated by the tragic death of their beloved Natasha. They are profoundly grateful for the support, love, and prayers of everyone, and ask for privacy during this very difficult time." Neeson donated Richardson's organs following her death. Later that night, theatre lights were dimmed on Broadway in Manhattan and in the West End of London as a mark of respect. The following day, 19 March, a private viewing was held at the American Irish Historical Society in Manhattan.

On 22 March, a private funeral took place at St. Peter's Episcopal Church near Millbrook, New York, close to the family's upstate home. Richardson was buried near her maternal grandmother, Rachel Kempson, in the churchyard. Her aunt, Lynn Redgrave, was buried in the same churchyard on 8 May 2010, near Richardson and Kempson. The 2010 Everest biographical film The Wildest Dream was her final film.

== Filmography ==
=== Film ===
Year	Film	Role	Notes	Ref.
1968	The Charge of the Light Brigade	Flower girl at wedding	Uncredited appearance	
1973	High Crime	Luisa, the girl playing hopscotch	Uncredited appearance	
1984	Every Picture Tells a Story	Miss Bridle		
1986	Gothic	Mary Shelley		
1987	A Month in the Country	Alice Keach		
1988	Patty Hearst	Patty Hearst		
1989	Fat Man and Little Boy	Jean Tatlock		
1990	The Handmaid's Tale	Kate / Offred		
1990	The Comfort of Strangers	Mary Kenway		
1991	The Favour, the Watch and the Very Big Fish	Sybil		
1992	Past Midnight	Laura Mathews		
1994	Widows' Peak	Mrs. Edwina Broome		
1994	Nell	Dr. Paula Olsen		
1998	The Parent Trap	Elizabeth "Liz" James		
2001	Blow Dry	Shelley Allen		
2001	Chelsea Walls	Mary		
2002	Waking Up in Reno	Darlene Dodd		
2002	Maid in Manhattan	Caroline Lane		
2005	Asylum	Stella Raphael	Also executive producer	
2005	The White Countess	Countess Sofia Belinskya		
2007	Evening	Constance Lord		
2008	Wild Child	Mrs. Kingsley	Final on-screen film appearance	
2010	The Wildest Dream	Ruth Mallory	Voice only; Posthumously released; Final film role	

=== Television ===
Year	Title	Role	Notes	Ref.
1984	Oxbridge Blues	Gabriella Folckwack		
1984	Ellis Island	Young Whore		
1985	The Adventures of Sherlock Holmes	Violet Hunter	Episode: "The Copper Beeches"	
1987	Ghosts	Regina Engstrand		
1992	Hostages	Jill Morrell		
1993	Zelda	Zelda Fitzgerald		
1993	Suddenly Last Summer	Catharine Holly	Episode: Performance (BBC) & Great Performances (PBS)	
1996	Tales from the Crypt	Fiona Havisham	Episode: "Fatal Caper"	
2001	Haven	Ruth Gruber	CTV Television Network	
2007	Mastersons of Manhattan	Victoria Masterson		
2008	Top Chef: New York	Guest Judge	Episode: "12 Days of Christmas"	

=== Theatre ===
Year	Production	Role	Venue(s)	Notes	Ref.
1983	On the Razzle	Marie	West Yorkshire Playhouse, Leeds		
1983	Top Girls		West Yorkshire Playhouse, Leeds		
1983	Charley's Aunt	Amy Spettigue	West Yorkshire Playhouse, Leeds		
1985	The Seagull	Nina Zarechnaya	Queen's Theatre, London		
1985	A Midsummer Night's Dream	Helena	Regent's Park Open Air Theatre, London		
1985	Hamlet	Ophelia	Young Vic Theatre, London		
1986– 1987	High Society	Tracy Lord	Leicester Haymarket Theatre, Leicester; Victoria Palace Theatre, London		
1993	Anna Christie	Anna Christie	Criterion Center Stage Right, Broadway	Nominated—Tony Award for Best Actress in a Play	
1998	Cabaret	Sally Bowles	Stephen Sondheim Theatre, Broadway	Tony Award for Best Actress in a Musical	
1999	Closer	Anna	Music Box Theatre, Broadway		
2003	The Lady from the Sea	Ellida Wangel	Almeida Theatre, London		
2005	A Streetcar Named Desire	Blanche DuBois	Studio 54, Broadway		
