= Patrick McGrath (novelist) =

British novelist (born 1950)

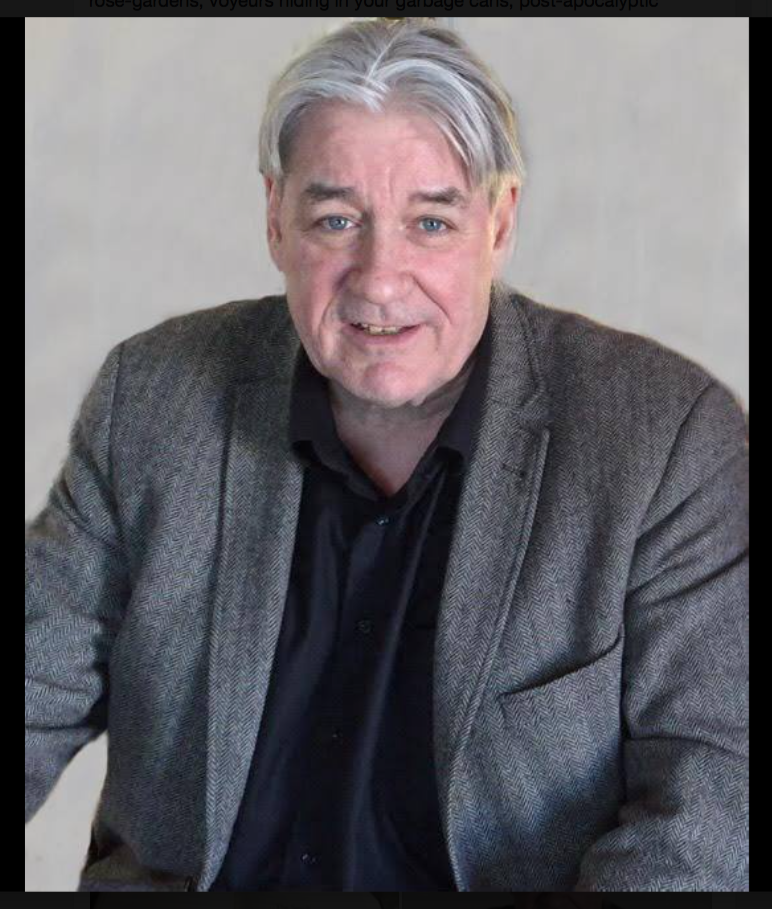
- McGrath in 2015
- Born: 7 February 1950 (age 76); London, England
- Education: Birmingham College of Commerce
- Occupation: Novelist
- Spouse: Maria Aitken (m. 1991)
- Writing career
- Genre: Gothic fiction

Patrick McGrath (born 7 February 1950) is a British novelist, whose work has been categorised as gothic fiction.

== Early life ==
McGrath was born in London and grew up near Broadmoor Hospital from the age of five where his father was Medical Superintendent. He was educated at a Jesuit boarding school in Windsor from the age of thirteen, before moving to another Jesuit public school, Stonyhurst College in Lancashire, upon the closure of his first school. In 1967, at the age of sixteen, he ran away from this institution to London. He graduated from the Birmingham College of Commerce with an honours degree in English and American literature in 1971, awarded externally by the University of London, before his father found him a job later that year in Penetang, Ontario working in the Oakridge top-security unit of the Penetang Mental Health Centre.

He has lived in various parts of North America and also spent several years on a remote island in the North Pacific, before finally settling in New York City in 1981.

McGrath also worked as a teacher of creative writing to undergraduate and graduate students at the University of Texas at Austin in the fall semester of 2006. He also taught craft courses for a number of years in the MFA program at Hunter College, New York, and since 2007, has taught an MFA program at the New School in New York.

His archive was acquired by the University of Stirling, Scotland.

== Career ==
His fiction is principally characterised by the first person unreliable narrator, and recurring subject matter in his work includes mental illness, repressed homosexuality and adulterous relationships.

His novel Martha Peake won the Premio Flaiano Prize in Italy and Asylum was shortlisted for The Guardian Fiction Prize in 1996.

He is also currently on the writing faculties of both the New School in New York and Princeton University.

Professor Emeritus of Creative Writing at Princeton, Joyce Carol Oates, makes the case that McGrath is transcribing the "nightmares of the 'shattered personality' that resonate within us all," calling his short stories "masterful and seductive, ... Bold, original, and disquieting tales are told by narrators who are themselves bizarre (a boot, a fly—to name just two) and are in most cases omniscient."

McGrath was elected a Fellow of the Royal Society of Literature in 2002. On 27 June 2018, the University of Stirling, Scotland, conferred on him the degree of Doctor of the University "for Patrick McGrath's outstanding support of academic research."

== Personal life ==
He is married to actress Maria Aitken and divides his time between London and New York City. He is the oldest of four siblings.

== Novels ==
- The Grotesque (1989) (filmed by John-Paul Davidson in 1995 – see The Grotesque, aka Grave Indiscretion or Gentlemen Don't Eat Poets)
- Spider (1990) (filmed by David Cronenberg in 2002 – see Spider)
- Dr Haggard's Disease (1993)
- Asylum (1996) (filmed by David Mackenzie in 2005 – see Asylum)
- Martha Peake: a Novel of the Revolution (2000)
- Port Mungo (2004)
- Trauma (2008)
- Constance (2013)
- The Wardrobe Mistress (2017)
- Last Days in Cleaver Square (2021)

Three of McGrath's novels and one of his stories have been adapted into films, two of which adaptations (Spider, 2002 and The Grotesque, 1995) were written by McGrath himself. The film adaptation for Asylum, 2005 was written by Patrick Marber and a short film made of The Lost Explorer from Blood and Water and Other Tales was adapted by Tim Walker. From The Wardrobe Mistress to the current unnamed novel-in-progress on the Spanish Civil War, McGrath shows increased interest in the fascistic tendencies in international politics and its effects on the psychology of characters. In the former, for example, the main character Joan Grice uncovers the man she had been living with for a long time, who recently died, had been in the past a member of Mosley's British Union of Fascists. This revelation is so upsetting that causes her to get crazy, and her mental breakdown is signed by a murderous act. Similarly, in McGrath's Last Days in Cleaver Square (2021), the narrator, an old man called Francis McNulty—a Spanish civil war veteran—is haunted by Francisco Franco's ghost, which appears in his London garden, and later in his bed, too. He is so much obsessed with his hallucinations that at a certain point, while in Madrid, Franco's spirit causes him to commit a bizarre act of atonement.

== Other works ==
- Blood and Water and Other Tales (1989) (short-story collection)
- Ghost Town: Tales of Manhattan Then and Now (2005) (linked short stories)
- Writing Madness (entire collected short stories from 1989 to 2014, along with four decades of selected criticism; edited by and with afterword from Danel Olson, prefaced by Joyce Carol Oates with seven original engravings from Harry Brockway. A 2017 Bram Stoker Award finalist; a 2018 World Fantasy Award winner ("Special Award – Professional").

McGrath has also co-edited and written the introduction to a highly influential anthology of short fiction, The New Gothic.

He has published many reviews and essays, including introductions to Barnaby Rudge, Moby Dick, The Strange Case of Dr Jekyll and Mr Hyde, and In a Glass Darkly.
