= Stones from the River =

1994 novel by Ursula Hegi

- Cover to the paperback edition
- Author: Ursula Hegi
- Language: English
- Series: The Burgdorf Cycle
- Genre: Novel
- Publisher: Poseidon Press
- Publication date: 1994
- Publication place: United States
- Media type: Print (hardback & paperback)
- Pages: 509 pp
- ISBN: 0-671-78075-1
- Followed by: Floating in My Mother's Palm

Stones from the River is the third-person omniscient 1994 novel by Ursula Hegi which chronicles 40 years of the life of Trudi, a woman with dwarfism, as she navigates the silently complicit, violent, and redemptive era of World War I and II Germany in the fictional town of Burgdorf.

Ursula Hegi's status as a German immigrant to America played a key role in shaping Stones from the River.

Stones from the River received multiple accolades and became a bestseller in 1997 when selected for Oprah's Book Club.

== Plot ==
The novel begins when Trudi Montag, protagonist, is born to Gertrude Montag, a mentally-tormented woman, and to Leo Montag, a newly-returned veteran of the First World War who runs a pay-library in the fictional river-side town of Burgdorf on July 23, 1915. Until Trudi is 3 months of age, Gertrude rejects Trudi and refuses to look at or touch her. She believes her own sin has caused her daughter to be born a zwerg, or dwarf, and retreats into insanity to avoid her guilt. Gertrude eventually accepts her infant daughter and becomes more of a mother and wife, although her mannerisms and actions remain erratic and require confinement both in their home and then at an asylum. After a miscarriage and due to increasing levels of agitation and unpredictability, Leo admits Gertrude to the asylum once more, where she catches pneumonia and dies.

At age 5, Trudi begins to hang from doorframes, hoping to grow. She also becomes friends with a boy, Georg Weiler, whose mother dresses him in girls' clothing; their friendship is short-lived.

At ages 6 through 8, Trudi goes to school and faces severe social ostracization from both her classmates and her nun-teachers. Despite this, she excels in school and develops an aptitude for history. Her father buys her a dog, called Seehund, to provide her with a close companion in the absence of a sibling. Seehund attracts the attention of a classmate, Eva Rosen, and she and Trudi become friends in secret, bonding over their mutual deformities: Trudi's dwarfism and Eva's large port-wine stain. When Eva denounces Trudi, Trudi tells a townsperson of Eva's birth defect; this begins a pattern for Trudi. Having learned the power of secrets, she begins cultivating them in the townspeople and spreading them like seeds for her own benefit and, on occasion, revenge.

At age 13, Trudi attends a carnival. One of the carnival entertainers is Pia, a well-dressed and proud dwarf woman. Exhilarated and feeling as though she is not alone, Trudi has a private discussion with Pia in her fabulous trailer and garners a sense of pride, wonderment, and identity for herself. As a result, Trudi learns to sew her own clothes and Leo, her father, adjusts the household furniture to fit her body. Not much later, four boys, including George Weiler, take and molest Trudi in a barn. When she escapes, Trudi goes to the river and calls out the names of her assailants one by one as she throws stones in to the river.

In the following years, Trudi slowly recovers from the assault and gets revenge by spreading reputation-hurting lies about her assailants.

In 1933, Hitler is named Chancellor and the Nazis come to power. The ever-present anti-Semitism in Burgdorf town begins taking solid forms as the Christian townsfolk begin boycotting Jewish-owned businesses, holding anti-Semitic marches, and targeting their Jewish neighbors through social neglect and severe physical violence. Book burnings begin as some authors are labelled as indecent. Trudi and her father hide these outlawed books in their pay-library.

From 1934 to 1938, as violence against Jews increases, Trudi and her father begin to seriously consider how they can help their Jewish neighbors in their hour of need. More and more youths join Nazi youth groups such as Hitler-Jugend and Bund Deutscher Mädchen. Complicity, silence, and fear inform the opinions of none-Nazi townsfolk.

In 1942, when Trudi is 27, she and her father begin to smuggle Jews into the basement of their homestead and pay-library with the help of some trustworthy neighbors and a tunnel they dug between their two houses. Eva, Trudi's childhood friend, is arrested by the gestapo and never seen again for the crime of being Jewish.

At a piano concert, Trudi makes a quiet comment about the over-use of the Nazi flag and is arrested shortly thereafter. After three weeks in prison, a guard interrogates Trudi and, after she tells him a story about a man with his heart outside of his chest, he lets her go with a warning.

Around this time, Trudi begins answering dating advertisements with a fabricated persona as a form of self-punishment for and an exploration of her otherness. From there, Trudi shows up at the agreed-upon locations and watches as the men look straight through her in search of their dates. Once, however, she becomes intrigued by the man she watches and, in a dash of anger, speaks to him; his name is Max Rudnik. Months of gentle but consistent interest from Max, an anti-Nazi water colorist and schoolteacher, results in Trudi agreeing to be with him romantically and sexually. In this way, Trudi learns to love herself because of her otherness instead of despite it; this revolutionizes her relationships with herself and others in ways she never imagined possible after a lifetime of ostracization. Max and Trudi confess their love for one another and share moments of happiness amidst the horrors of World War II Germany. When Max goes to Dresden, he dies there in a bombing. Heartbroken, Trudi struggles to ever accept that Max died, instead telling herself stories of him falling in love and running away with another woman.

By 1945, the war has ended. Former Nazi townspeople deny their affiliation with the Nazi Party. Growth and progress replace the destruction of the war day by day, though dishonesty still reigns in Burgdorf.

In 1949, Trudi takes to loving Hanna, the child of other townspeople. When her affection for Hanna borders on parent-like, she ruminates on her grief over Max, wondering if they might have ever had children; on account of this reemergent pain, Trudi distances herself from Hanna.

Leo becomes old and frail, dying the day after his 67th birthday. The novel ends as grief-stricken Trudi walks along the riverside, contemplating her life, and ultimately experiencing the love of the people around her in a way as never before.

== Background ==
Hegi was born in Dusseldorf, Germany, in 1946, just one year after World War II ended. As a child, Hegi loved to read, often retelling the stories she read to her younger sister.

In 1964, Hegi emigrated to the United States of America. She has lived there since.

Hegi wrote and published the subsequent novels in the Burgdorf Series before she wrote and published Stones from the River. In the process of writing, Hegi received a travel grant and travelled back to her birth town, Dusseldorf, where she met up with an acquaintance from her childhood: a dwarf woman who lived there through the Second World War. This woman not only helped to shape the character of Trudi Montag, but also helped Hegi to bring to life the many perspectives showcased by the characters in Stones from the River.

In addition to having done extensive research on the lives of German citizens who endured the Second World War, including with the woman in Dusseldorf, Hegi cites her own experience as an immigrant as informing the perspectives she encodes in to her work. She is quoted as saying that:

"I found that Americans of my generation knew more about the Holocaust than I did. When I was growing up you could not ask about it; it was absolutely taboo. We grew up with the silence. It was normal and familiar; these are terrible words considering the circumstances."

Hegi credits her godmother, Kate Capelle, for breaking the silence in Hegi's own family by releasing her documentation of her life during the war years, an act which went on to motivate Hegi's writing.

On account of her omniscient writing style, Hegi stated that: "It's my belief that the present, future and past merge within any given moment."

== Reception ==
Stones from the River is:

- Purported as Hegi's masterpiece work.
- A New York Times Best Book (1994).
- A PEN/Faulkner award nominee.
- An Oprah's Book Club selection (1997).
- An Eagles selection (1997)
