= Kazuko Miyamoto =

Japanese-born American artist (born 1942)

- 宮本 和子
- Born: 1942; Tokyo, Empire of Japan
- Education: Contemporary Art Research Studio, Arts Student League, Pratt Graphic Art Center
- Known for: String Constructions (1972–1979)
- Movement: Minimalism, Postminimalism, Performance art

Kazuko Miyamoto (宮本 和子, Miyamoto Kazuko, born 1942) is a Japanese-born American visual and performance artist based in New York City, associated with feminist art, minimalism, and postminimalism. Miyamoto's artistic style combines formalist minimalism with a foregrounding of the artist's hand to insert a subtle and ironic commentary on the confident masculinity of male-dominated minimalist art. Miyamoto has been called "a preeminent feminist figure of minimalism" and "a major figure of the Minimal and post-Minimal art scene in New York."

== Early life and education ==
Kazuko Miyamoto was born in wartime Tokyo, Japan in 1942. In 1962, she began studying at the Contemporary Art Research Studio (Gendai Bijutsu Kenkyūjo) in Tokyo, graduating in 1964. That same year, Miyamoto emigrated to New York, where she began four years of study at the Arts Student League, graduating in 1968. She then studied printmaking at the Pratt Graphic Art Center for a year.

In 1969, Miyamoto began a longtime association with the American minimalist artist Sol LeWitt, working for many years as his personal assistant. The two met when a fire alarm called them outside of the Lower East Side artist loft building in which they were both living at the time. In addition to being her employer, LeWitt also became Miyamoto's friend, promoter, and art patron. Over several decades, the two artists would have significant influence on each other as they sought to destroy the canvas and break out of the frame of traditional artworks.

== Career ==
In her early work, between 1968 and 1972, Miyamoto was primarily a painter of large-scale bichromatic canvases, works that sought to slyly undermine formalism by introducing slight imperfections and a subtle sense of spontaneity to seemingly geometrical constructions. One series recalled the Japanese board game go, with warmly contoured circles spaced out over a spindly grid; in another series, the concept was reversed, featuring a honeycombed out-of-focus lattice structure overlaid with a more clearly delineated lattice.

From 1972 to 1979, Miyamoto embarked on perhaps her most famous set of works, a breakthrough series of sculptural installations known as String Constructions. At first, these were simple two-dimensional works consisting of industrial cotton string wrapped around nails embedded into the studio wall. But over time, the String Constructions became more and more complex, expanding outward from the wall to connect to the floor, and eventually descending fully from the wall to stand proudly on their own. The constructions also took on increasingly complex geometric forms, featuring hundreds or even thousands of strings. The constructions were both solid yet ethereal, and seemed to shift and take on different forms as the viewer moved past them.

A committed feminist, Miyamoto became an early member of New York's A.I.R. Gallery, the first all-female arts collective in the United States. In 1975, Miyamoto held the first of five solo exhibitions she would show at the A.I.R. Gallery.

Beginning in the 1980s, Miyamoto became increasingly interested in the corporeality of the human body. She began undertaking artistic performances in various states of dress and undress, which she would continue to carry out periodically throughout her career.

In 1983, inspired by the sight of a swan's nest and her experience of her own pregnancy, Miyamoto's art shifted in a new direction, in which she would create large sculptural pieces that wove together tree branches with brown paper that she twisted to look like large ropes. These artworks drew inspiration from nature and its structures, and vaguely recalled the large shimenawa ropes found in front of Japanese Shinto shrines.

From 1987 and continuing into the mid-2000s, Miyamoto began a new series, Kimono, in which she would create Japanese-style kimono garments out of a wide variety of materials, incorporating social commentary, feminist critique, and personal narrative by printing, writing, or attaching various objects, images, or narratives to the garments.

== Collections ==
Miyamoto has been recognized in numerous solo exhibitions at both public and private institutions. Her works are in the collections of Metropolitan Museum of Art, the Museum of Modern Art, the Princeton University Art Museum, the National Museum of Modern Art, Tokyo, the National Museum of Modern Art, Kyoto, the Lentos Art Museum, the Art Gallery of New South Wales, the Smithsonian American Art Museum, and the Yale University Art Gallery, among others.
