= Zeroville =

2007 novel by Steve Erickson

- Author: Steve Erickson
- Language: English
- Publisher: Europa Editions
- Publication date: 2007
- Publication place: United States
- Media type: Print (hardback & paperback)
- Pages: 329
- ISBN: 978-1-933372-39-6
- Preceded by: Our Ecstatic Days
- Followed by: These Dreams of You

Zeroville is a 2007 novel by Steve Erickson about the upheaval in the film industry in the 1970s. It has been translated into French, Spanish, Italian, Japanese and other languages. It was named one of the best novels of the year by Newsweek, the Washington Post BookWorld and the Los Angeles Times Book Review among others, and in winter 2008 was one of the five favorite novels of 800 novelists and critics in a poll of the National Book Critics Circle. The novel was also shortlisted for the Believer Book Award.

It was later adapted into a widely derided film starring James Franco and Seth Rogen.

== Plot ==
Nicknamed "Vikar", Ike Jerome, a 24-year-old architecture student inspired by the few films he has seen, rides the bus into Hollywood. Jerome is initially portrayed as violent and short tempered; his social ineptitude is slowly revealed as borderline autistic. With a tattoo of Montgomery Clift and Elizabeth Taylor as they appear in the film A Place in the Sun on the back of his head which he keeps shaven, his appearance is anachronistic and jarring to most of the people he encounters in end-of-the-'60s Los Angeles. He gets his first job in the industry as a set builder during which time he meets an aging film editor whom he befriends, and begins a dreamlike journey into the world of films that eventually ends in tragedy and almost horrific discovery.

== Themes ==
Zeroville discusses the supernatural power of films over people and how films become like gods in our worship of them. Vikar's bizarre discovery of a secret movie, found frame by frame in every film ever made, confirms this.

Zeroville is partially a critique of the ways movies and Hollywood changed in the 1970s, as the old studios are taken over by young renegade filmmakers. Vikar laments on the disappearance of film from Hollywood: "'I'm in the movie capital of the world,' Vikar says, 'and nobody knows anything about movies'".

Zeroville's plot is woven with two older stories or myths: the binding of Isaac and the legend of Perceval.

== Notes ==
Many actors, writers and directors popular in the 1970s make appearances, including Robert De Niro, John Milius, Margot Kidder, Ryan O'Neal, Ali MacGraw, Paul Schrader, Luciano Damiani, Brian De Palma, and the ghost of Montgomery Clift.

A motion picture adaptation of Zeroville starring James Franco and Megan Fox was released in September 2019.
