= The Sea Came in at Midnight =

1999 novel by Steve Erickson

- Author: Steve Erickson
- Language: English
- Genre: Novel
- Publisher: William Morrow
- Publication date: 1999
- Media type: Print (hardcover and paperback)
- Pages: 259 pp. (hardcover & paperback edition)
- ISBN: 978-0-380-97766-6 (hardcover edition)
- OCLC: 40193563
- Dewey Decimal: 813/.54 21
- LC Class: PS3555.R47 S33 1999
- Preceded by: Amnesiascope
- Followed by: Our Ecstatic Days

The Sea Came in at Midnight (1999) is the sixth novel by Steve Erickson. It has been translated into French, German, Italian, Russian and Japanese. It was named one of the year's best novels by The New York Times Book Review and shortlisted for a British Fantasy Award.

It was followed by a sequel, Our Ecstatic Days, in 2005.

== Plot ==
The novel starts at the end of 1999, when Kristin, a teenage drop-out, answers a sexual ad written by a man who calls himself the Occupant. Behind the poetic language of the ad, it is clear that the Occupant is looking for a sexual slave, yet Kristin accepts the pact and goes to live in his house in Los Angeles.

The Occupant's job is unclear: he defines himself as an apocalyptologist, and is busy drawing a calendar on the walls of his bedroom, on which he maps all the irrational events following May 1968, which, according to him, define the end-of-the-century in which the novel is set.

Their relationship evolves, until, after a climactic moment, the girl understands that she has replaced the Occupant's partner, who disappeared. After this crisis, the Occupant begins to tell his story.

His story is set mostly in Paris, where he met Angie, who will become his partner. Next we hear the story of Angie, whose real name is Saki, the daughter of a Japanese physicist working for a US defense project. She has gone to New York to work as a lap dancer. Her involvement with pornographic films ultimately leads her to be hired by Mitch, who produces snuff films.

Angie is saved by Louise, Mitch's wife, and after this event (which takes place immediately before Angie flies to Paris, where she will meet Carl) the novel tells the story of Louise and Mitch, then back to Carl.
