= The Grotesque (novel) =

1989 novel by Patrick McGrath

- First edition (US)
- Author: Patrick McGrath
- Language: English
- Genre: Gothic novel
- Published: 1989
- Publisher: Poseidon Press (US); Viking Press (UK)
- Publication place: United Kingdom
- Media type: Print (Hardcover & Paperback)
- Pages: 186
- ISBN: 0-671-66509-X
- OCLC: 19126411
- Dewey Decimal: 813/.54 19
- LC Class: PS3563.C3663 G7 1989

The Grotesque is a 1989 gothic fiction novel by British author Patrick McGrath. It was adapted into a 1995 film starring Alan Bates, Lena Headey, Theresa Russell and Sting.

== Plot summary ==
Wheelchair-using Sir Hugo Coal narrates this tale of vice and murder at stately Crook Manor. Unable to communicate with those around him, the quirky Sir Hugo watches and listens, recounting recent events that began with his daughter's engagement, followed by the disappearance of her fiancé and the subsequent investigation. Of particular note is new butler Fledge, who Sir Hugo believes is not only the cause of the troubles at the estate, but seeking to replace him as lord of the manor and in Lady Harriet's bed.

== Reviews ==
From The Sunday Times (United Kingdom):

Magnificently grim ... [McGrath] serves up this cold slice of modern Gothic with the deranged relish of a Poe but also the acrid irony of a Waugh.
