= Jean Paul Bourdier =

American photographer

Jean-Paul Bourdier
- Occupations: Photographer, Artist, Professor, Filmmaker
- Website: http://www.jeanpaulbourdier.com/

Jean Paul Bourdier is a photographer and Professor of Architecture, Photography and Visual Studies at the University of California, Berkeley.

== Biography ==
His photography often focuses on body art and the intersections of natural environments and human bodies. A frequent collaborator with filmmaker, feminist and postcolonial scholar, and artist Trinh T. Minh-ha, he has co-authored, co-directed and co-produced books, films, and performances. These collaborations have explored traditional West African dwellings and architecture, transnational and postcolonial experience and imagination. Originally from France, Bourdier taught in Italy and Senegal before moving permanently to California. His most recent book, Body Unbound (2017), includes verse and architectural sketches in combination with his photographs, providing a window into Bourdier's photographic practice. Preferring to work with analog photography, Bourdier's photographs rely on body paint and the staging of his models to blend body and environment rather than digital editing or collage. He has said that he prefers analog photography due to the materiality, mystery, and intimacy of the medium. Bourdier has been the recipient of numerous awards and fellowships, including Guggenheim, UC President's Humanities, and Getty awards.

== Publications ==
- African Spaces - Designs for Living in Upper Volta (in coll. with Trin, T. Minh-ha, Holmes & Meier, 1985)
- Dwellings, settlements, and tradition : cross-cultural perspectives (in coll. with Nezar AlSayyad, University Press of America, 1989)
- Drawn from African Dwellings (in coll. with Trinh T. Minh-ha, Indiana University Press, 1996)
- Bodyscapes (Earth Aware Editions, 2007)
- Habiter un monde (in coll. with Trinh T. Minh-ha, Editions Alternatives, 2005)

English Edition: Vernacular Architecture in West Africa: A World in Dwelling (in coll. with Trinh T. Minh-ha, Routledge, 2011)

- Leap Into the Blue (Channel Photographics, 2013)
- Body Unbound (2017)
