= Amnesiascope =

1996 novel by Steve Erickson

- First edition
- Author: Steve Erickson
- Language: English
- Genre: Avantpop
- Publisher: Henry Holt and Company
- Publication date: 1996
- Publication place: United States
- Media type: Print (hardback & paperback)
- Pages: 225 pp
- ISBN: 978-0-8050-5361-6

Amnesiascope is a 1996 novel by Steve Erickson. Set in Los Angeles after a cataclysmic earthquake, the novel incorporates elements of other novels that Erickson had published, such as the silent film from his first novel, Days Between Stations. Though not a genre novel, it was a finalist for the British Fantasy Award.

== Plot summary ==
The main character lives in a converted hotel in Hollywood, where he works as the film critic for a weekly newspaper. The story is told in an oneiric fashion, without a clear explanation of all the strange elements of a partly real, partly imaginary Los Angeles. Amnesiascope focuses mostly on the protagonist's relationship with Viv, a sexually adventurous, committed artist, with whom the narrator works on the making of an avant-garde erotic short film. The narrator also has to deal with different factions at the paper, the various time zones he experiences driving through LA, the complexities of making a pornographic film, and his feelings of guilt after writing for his paper a review of The Death of Marat, a non-existent film by Adolphe Sarre, a non-existent director, which takes on a life of its own. The non-linear story is often interrupted by descriptions of dreams that the protagonist or other characters have had. Events told have a dream-like quality, inasmuch as what seems to have actually happened is subsequently dealt with as if it were a dream or fantasy (cf. the first meeting with Justine, who subsequently doesn't seem to remember having met the protagonist). At the end of the novel, the narrating I has lost his job at the paper and Viv, yet he has gained back a sense of himself.

== Themes ==
Although Erickson has a style similar to magical realism or surrealism at times, Amnesiascope is often considered his most autobiographical novel. The narrator works for a weekly paper in Los Angeles as Erickson did from 1989 to 1992. He continues to explore themes from his other novels, such as the idea that fiction is often a superior reality. During the filming of the pornographic film, the narrator writes about a woman he meets, and though the same woman is later cast in the role, she cannot play herself. Also, though the narrator publishes a review of a film that he has invented, which is taken from one of Erickson's earlier novels, he soon hears people talking about the movie as though it's real, and finally ends up at a film festival where he watches his imaginary movie on the big screen.

The novel has a surrealist atmosphere that is strengthened by the idea that Hollywood is a dream factory that produces imaginary stories. Much of the plot describes and analyzes the complex and contradictory relation of the protagonist with the most important women in his life. That two of the women, Viv, the avant-garde director, and Justine, the failed actress, belong to the cinema industry acts as a metaphor for the part of the human mind that imagines and dreams.

The novel is also characterized by an atmosphere of unrestrained eroticism, which may well be related to pornographic cinema, another industry of Los Angeles.
