= Steve Erickson =

American novelist

- Born: Santa Monica, California, U.S.
- Occupations: Novelist; essayist; critic
- Writing career
- Period: 1985–present
- Genres: Avantpop; surrealism; slipstream
- Website: steveerickson.org

Stephen Michael Erickson is an American novelist. The author of influential works such as Days Between Stations, Tours of the Black Clock and Zeroville, he is the recipient of the American Academy of Arts and Letters award, the Lannan Lifetime Achievement Award and a Guggenheim Fellowship.

== Biography ==
Steve Erickson was born and raised in Los Angeles. For many years his mother, a former actress, ran a small theatre in L.A. His father, who died in 1990, was a photographer. Erickson had a pronounced stutter as a child when teachers believed he could not read. This motif occasionally has recurred in novels such as Amnesiascope. At UCLA Erickson studied literature, film, journalism and political philosophy, and for a few years he worked as a freelance writer for alternative weekly newspapers. Along with three works of non-fiction, Erickson has published 10 novels in more than a dozen languages. His books have appeared on best-of-the-year lists by The New York Times, the Los Angeles Times and The Washington Post.

A "writer's writer," Erickson is regarded as one of America's best living novelists, "a maximal visionary...in the league of [Thomas] Pynchon, [Don] DeLillo, [Margaret] Atwood, [Salman] Rushdie, [Ben] Okri, [Orhan] Pamuk." His work has been cited by Pynchon, David Foster Wallace, Richard Powers, Dana Spiotta, William Gibson, Kathy Acker, Rick Moody, Joshua Cohen and Mark Z. Danielewski. Greil Marcus has called Erickson "the only authentic American surrealist," and Tours of the Black Clock appears on Larry McCaffery's list of the 20th Century’s Greatest Hits: 100 English-Language Books of Fiction. In a winter 2008 poll by the National Book Critics Circle of 800 novelists and writers, Zeroville was named one of the five favorite novels of the previous year, and in the December 2015 issue of Granta, Jonathan Lethem declared the then unreleased Shadowbahn (Erickson's most acclaimed work) the best American novel of whatever year in which it was ultimately published.

In 2021, the University Press of Mississippi issued Conversations With Steve Erickson as part of a series that includes William Faulkner, F. Scott Fitzgerald, Ernest Hemingway, James Baldwin, William S. Burroughs and Toni Morrison, proclaiming Erickson "a subterranean literary figure...[whose] dream-fueled blend of European modernism, American pulp and paranoid late-century postmodernism makes him essential to an appreciation of the last 40 years of American fiction."

BBC Radio 4 broadcast an adaptation of Shadowbahn as part of its Dangerous Visions series in 2018, and a motion picture of Zeroville starring James Franco, Seth Rogen and Jacki Weaver was released in 2019. Twice a finalist for the National Magazine Award, Erickson has written for Esquire, Smithsonian, Rolling Stone and the New York Times Magazine among others, and for 14 years was founding editor of the literary journal Black Clock. Erickson is a Distinguished Professor and Chair of the Department of Creative Writing at the University of California, Riverside.

== Bibliography ==
=== Novels ===
- Days Between Stations (1985)
- Rubicon Beach (1986)
- Tours of the Black Clock (1989)
- Arc d'X (1993)
- Amnesiascope (1996)
- The Sea Came in at Midnight (1999)
- Our Ecstatic Days (2005)
- Zeroville (2007)
- These Dreams of You (2012)
- Shadowbahn (2017)

=== Other ===
- Leap Year (1989)
- American Nomad (1997)
- American Stutter (2022)

== Honors and awards ==
- National Endowment for the Arts (1987)
- Notable Book of the Year, The New York Times Book Review (1987): Rubicon Beach
- Notable Book of the Year, The New York Times Book Review (1989): Tours of the Black Clock
- Best Books of the Year, Village Voice (1989): Tours of the Black Clock
- Notable Book of the Year, The New York Times Book Review (1993): Arc d'X
- Best Fiction of the Year, Entertainment Weekly (1993): Arc d'X
- Best Novel nominee, British Fantasy Award (1997): Amnesiascope
- Notable Book of the Year, The New York Times Book Review (1999): The Sea Came in at Midnight
- Best Books of the Year, Uncut (1999): The Sea Came in at Midnight
- Best Novel nominee, British Fantasy Award (1999): The Sea Came in at Midnight
- 2001 MacDowell Fellow
- 2002 MacDowell Fellow
- Best Books of the Year, Los Angeles Times Book Review (2005): Our Ecstatic Days
- Best Books of the Year, Uncut (2005): Our Ecstatic Days
- John Simon Guggenheim Foundation Fellowship (2007)
- Best Books of the Year, Newsweek (2007): Zeroville
- Best Books of the Year, Washington Post BookWorld (2007): Zeroville
- Best Books of the Year, Los Angeles Times Book Review (2007): Zeroville
- American Academy of Arts and Letters, Award in Literature (2010)
- Best Books of the Year, Los Angeles Times (2012): These Dreams of You
- Lannan Lifetime Achievement Award (2014)
- Best Books of the Year, Los Angeles Times (2017): Shadowbahn
- Best Books of the Year, Bookworm, KCRW (2017): Shadowbahn
