= Cartwright (surname) =

Cartwright is an English surname that originally meant a maker of carts. Notable people with the surname include:

- Al Cartwright (1917–2015), American sportswriter
- Alan Cartwright (1945–2021), British musician
- Alexander Cartwright (1820–1892), American engineer and supposed inventor of baseball
- Angela Cartwright (born 1952), British-born American actress
- Ann Cartwright (born 1925), British statistician and socio-medical researcher
- Anthony Cartwright (cricketer) (1940–2023), New Zealand cricketer
- Anthony Cartwright (writer) (born 1973), British novelist
- Arnaud Cartwright Marts (1888–1970), American academic, president of Bucknell University (1935–1945)
- Barbara Cartwright, Bahamian politician
- Bec Cartwright (born 1983), Australian actress and singer
- Ben Cartwright (disambiguation), multiple people
- Bill Cartwright (born 1957), American basketball player
- Bill Cartwright (disambiguation), several people
- Brian Cartwright (born 1948), American lawyer and astrophysicist
- Bryce Cartwright (born 1994), Australian rugby league player
- Buck Cartwright, American politician in Oklahoma
- Buns Cartwright (1889–1976), English cricketer and soldier
- Caleb Cartwright (1696?–1763), Irish academic and clergyman
- Carol A. Cartwright, American academic, president of Kent State University (1991–2006) and Bowling Green State University (2008)
- Casimir Cartwright van Straubenzee (1867–1956), British soldier
- Christopher Cartwright (1602–1658), English clergyman
- Cyril Cartwright (cyclist), British cyclist
- D. F. Cartwright (1916–2009), British soldier, businessman, and commercial fisherman
- Dave Cartwright (1943–2015), British musician and author
- David Cartwright (1920–1997), tenth Suffragan Bishop of Southampton
- Deirdre Cartwright, British guitarist
- Dorwin Cartwright (1915–2008), American social psychologist
- Earl Cartwright, American politician
- Ed Cartwright (1859–1933), American baseball player
- Edmund Cartwright (1743–1823), British clergyman and inventor of the power loom
- Edward David Cartwright (1920–1997), British bishop, Bishop of Southampton (1984–1989)
- Erik Cartwright (born 1950), musician
- Fairfax Leighton Cartwright (1857–1928), British author and diplomat, Ambassador to Austria-Hungary (1908–1913)
- Fairfax William Cartwright (1823–1881), British politician
- Gary Cartwright (born 1952), Australian politician
- Geoff Cartwright, Australian actor
- George Cartwright (disambiguation), multiple people
- Greg Cartwright (born 1970), American musician
- Hannah Cartwright, a.k.a. Augustus Ghost, vocalist for Snow Ghosts
- Harold Cartwright (born 1951), English cricketer
- Herbert Cartwright (born 1916), English footballer
- Hilton Cartwright (born 1990), Zimbabwean-Australian cricketer
- Hubert James Cartwright (1900–1958), Roman Catholic coadjutor bishop of the Roman Catholic Diocese of Wilmington
- Hugh Cartwright (died 1572), English politician
- Ian Cartwright (born 1964), English footballer
- Jackson Robert Cartwright, American politician in Oklahoma
- James Cartwright (born 1949), American soldier, eighth Vice Chairman of the Joint Chiefs of Staff
- James Cartwright (canoeist) (born 1976), Canadian canoeist
- James Cartwright (disambiguation), multiple people
- Jan Eric Cartwright, American politician in Oklahoma
- Jim Cartwright (born 1958), English dramatist
- Joe Cartwright (rugby league), English rugby league player
- John Cartwright (disambiguation), multiple people
- Joseph Cartwright (disambiguation), multiple people
- Julia Cartwright Ady (1851–1924), British art critic
- Justin Cartwright (1945–2018), British novelist
- Keith Cartwright, American politician in Oklahoma
- Kelly Cartwright (born 1989), Australian athlete
- Kenneth St George Cartwright (1891–1964), British mycologist
- Kit Cartwright (born 1954), American football administrator and a former American football player and coach
- Lawrence Cartwright (born 1948), Bahamian politician
- Lee Cartwright (born 1972), English footballer
- Lionel Cartwright (born 1960), American country musician
- Lisa Cartwright, American scholar of visual culture
- Lynn Cartwright (1927–2004), American actress
- Mark Cartwright (born 1973), English footballer
- Mary Cartwright (1900–1998), British mathematician
- Matt Cartwright (born 1961), American lawyer and politician representing the 8th district of Pennsylvania in the US House of Representatives
- Mrs H. Cartwright (fl. 1776 -1787), British writer
- Nancy Cartwright (born 1957), American voice actress
- Nancy Cartwright (philosopher) (born 1943), American philosopher
- Oscar Ling Cartwright (1900–1983), American entomologist who specialized in scarab beetles
- Paulyn Cartwright, American academic
- Peggy Cartwright (1912–2001), Canadian silent-era actress
- Peter Cartwright (disambiguation), multiple people
- Philip Cartwright (1880–1955), English cricketer
- Randy Cartwright (born 1951), American animator
- Rianti Cartwright (born 1983), Indonesian actress, model, and television presenter
- Richard Cartwright (disambiguation), multiple people
- Robert Cartwright, English art director
- Rock Cartwright (born 1979), American football player
- Ryan Cartwright (born 1981), British actor
- Samuel A. Cartwright (1793–1863), Confederate States of America physician
- Samuel Cartwright (1789–1864), British dentist
- Shanendon Cartwright, Bahamian politician
- Sierra Cartwright (born 1963), British novelist
- Silvia Cartwright (born 1943), New Zealand lawyer, 18th Governor-General of New Zealand (2001–2006)
- Stephen Cartwright (1947–2004), British illustrator
- Steve Cartwright, American computer and video game designer
- Thomas Cartwright (disambiguation), multiple people
- Tom Cartwright (1935–2007), English cricketer
- Veronica Cartwright (born 1949), English actress
- Vincent Cartwright (1882–1965), English rugby union player and cricketer
- Virginia Cartwright (born 1943), American artist
- Walter Cartwright (1871–?), English footballer
- Wilburn Cartwright (1892–1979), American lawyer and politician
- William Cartwright (disambiguation), multiple people

== Fictional people ==
From the television series Bonanza:

- Adam Cartwright, the oldest child of Ben Cartwright
- Ben Cartwright (character), cattle rancher, patriarch of the Cartwright clan
- Hoss Cartwright, the middle son of Ben Cartwright
- Jamie Hunter Cartwright, the adopted son of Ben Cartwright
- Little Joe Cartwright, the youngest Cartwright

Other fictional characters:

- Annie Cartwright, policewoman in Life on Mars
- Casey Cartwright, one of the main characters from Greek
- Fleet Admiral Cartwright, a character in the Star Trek universe
- Harold Cartwright, a protagonist from Grand Theft Auto: London 1969 and Grand Theft Auto: London 1961
- Helen Cartwright, one of the main characters from Nights: Journey of Dreams
- Lorna Cartwright, former character in EastEnders
- Madge Cartwright, the sole heiress to Cartwright's Soap Empire; and fiancée of Teddy Meldrum in You Rang, M'Lord?
- River Cartwright, one of the main characters from Slow Horses
- Rosie Cartwright, member of The Sleepover Club
- Rusty Cartwright, one of the main characters from Greek

== See also ==
- Cartwright (disambiguation)
- Wainwright (name)
- Wheelwright
- Wright (surname)
