= Sierra =

Sierra (Spanish for "mountain range" or "mountain chain" and "saw", from Latin serra) may refer to the following:

== Places ==
=== Mountains and mountain ranges ===
- Sierra de Juárez, a mountain range in Baja California, Mexico
- Sierra de las Nieves, a mountain range in Andalusia, Spain
- Sierra Madre (disambiguation), various mountain ranges
  - Sierra Madre (Philippines), a mountain range in the east of Luzon, Philippines
- Sierra mountains (disambiguation)
- Sierra Nevada, a mountain range in the U.S. states of California and Nevada
- Sierra Nevada (Spain), a mountain range in Andalusia, Spain
- Sierra de San Pedro Mártir, a mountain range in Baja California, Mexico
- Sierra Maestra, a mountain range in Cuba

=== Other places ===
==== Africa ====
- Sierra Leone, a country located on the coast of West Africa

==== Asia ====
- Sierra Bullones, Bohol, Philippines

==== Europe ====
- Sierra Nevada National Park (Spain), Andalusia, Spain
- Sierra Nevada Observatory, Granada, Spain

==== North America ====
- High Sierra Trail, California, United States
- Sierra County, California
- Sierra County, New Mexico
- Sierra Foothills AVA, an American Viticultural Area in California
- Sierra National Forest, California, United States
- Sierra Sky Park Airport, Fresno, California
- Sierra Valley, in Plumas and Sierra counties, California

==== South America ====
- Sierra (Ecuador), the mountain region of Ecuador
- Sierra (Peru), the mountain region of Peru
- Sierra Nevada de Santa Marta, a national park in northern Colombia
- Sierra Nevada National Park (Venezuela), a national park in the Andean Region of Venezuela

== Arts, entertainment, and media ==
=== Music ===
- Sierra (group), American musical artists
- Sierra (metal band), Canadian progressive rock band
- "Sierra" (song), a song by Maddie & Tae
- "Sierra", a song by Cursive from the 2003 album The Ugly Organ
- "Sierra", a song by Boz Scaggs on 1994's Some Change

=== Other uses in arts, entertainment, and media ===
- Sierra (film), a 1950 Western starring Audie Murphy
- Sierra (magazine), published by the Sierra Club
- Sierra (TV series), a 1974–1975 NBC television show produced by Universal Studios
- Sierra Entertainment, a defunct developer and publisher of video games

== Computing ==
- Sierra (supercomputer), or ATS-2, a supercomputer for nuclear weapon simulations at Lawrence Livermore National Laboratory
- Sierra, a library management system developed by Innovative Interfaces
- macOS Sierra, the thirteenth major release of the desktop operating system from Apple Inc., formerly known as Mac OS X and OS X

== Organizations ==
- Sierra Bullets, an American ammunition manufacturer
- Sierra Club, an environmental organization in the United States
- Sierra Club Canada, an environmental organization in Canada
- Sierra College, a community college located in Rocklin, California

== Transportation ==
- Acme Sierra, an American experimental aircraft built in 1948
- Advanced Aeromarine Sierra, a glider
- Tata Sierra, a car produced by the Tata Motors
- Ford Sierra, a car produced by the Ford Motor Company
- GMC Sierra, various trucks and SUVs produced by General Motors
- List of ships named Sierra
- Sierra-class corvette, a ship class of the Mexican Navy
- Sierra-class submarine, a Russian attack nuclear submarine
- USS Sierra (disambiguation), the name of more than one United States Navy ship
- Sierra Highway

== Other uses ==
- Sierra (name)
- Sierra (retailer), an off-price retailer formerly known as Sierra Trading Post
- Pacific sierra or Mexican sierra (species Scomberomorus sierra), a Spanish mackerel fish
- PMC-Sierra, a semiconductor company
- Sierra, the NATO phonetic alphabet designation for the letter S

== See also ==
- Cera (disambiguation)
- Cerro (disambiguation)
- High Sierra (disambiguation)
- Jamón serrano, Spanish for "Sierra ham"
- La Sierra (disambiguation)
- Sierra Nevada (disambiguation)
- Serra (disambiguation)
- Serra (surname)
- Sierre, Switzerland
