= Fresno Airport (disambiguation) =

Fresno Yosemite International Airport is a joint military–public airport in Fresno, California, United States (FAA: FAT).

Fresno Airport may refer to:

- Fresno Chandler Executive Airport, a general aviation and reliever airport in Fresno, California, United States (FAA: FCH)
- Sierra Sky Park Airport, a privately owned, public-use airport in Fresno, California, United States (FAA: E79)
