= Bill Cartwright (disambiguation) =

Bill Cartwright (born 1957) is an American basketball player and coach.

Bill Cartwright may also refer to:

- Bill Cartwright (footballer, born 1884) (1884–?), English footballer who played for Gainsborough, Chelsea and Tottenham from 1908 to 1913
- Bill Cartwright (footballer, born 1922) (1922–1992), English footballer who played for Tranmere Rovers from 1946 to 1948

== See also ==
- William Cartwright (disambiguation)
- Cartwright (surname)
