= KFCH =

KFCH may refer to:

- KFCH (FM), a defunct radio station (89.5 FM) formerly licensed to serve Childress, Texas, United States
- Fresno Chandler Executive Airport (ICAO code KFCH)
