= Beg for Me =

Beg for Me may refer to:

- "Beg for Me", a song by Korn from Issues
- "Beg for Me", a song by Lily Allen from West End Girl
- "Beg for Me", a song by Red Velvet from The ReVe Festival 2022 – Feel My Rhythm
- Beg for Me, a book by Sierra Cartwright
