= Sierra (name) =

Sierra is both a surname and a feminine given name. It is the Spanish word for saw or mountain range. It originates from the Galicia and Asturias regions of northern Spain.

Notable people with the name include:

== Surname ==
- Álvaro Sierra (born 1967), Colombian road cyclist
- Andrea Sierra (born 1998), Spanish footballer
- Arlene Sierra (born 1970), American classical composer
- Gabriel Sierra (born 1975), Colombian visual artist
- Javier Sierra (born 1971), Spanish journalist
- Jessica Sierra (born 1985), American Idol 4 contestant
- José David Sierra (born 1980), Puerto Rican drag queen also known as Jessica Wild
- José Luis Sierra (born 1968), Chilean footballer
- Liza del Sierra (born 1985), French pornographic actress, film director, and producer. In use as stage name.
- Magneuris Sierra (born 1996), Dominican professional baseball player
- Miguel Sierra (footballer) (born 2004), Spanish footballer
- Nadine Sierra (born 1988), American operatic soprano
- Roberto Sierra (born 1953), Puerto Rican classical composer
- Rubén Sierra (born 1965), Puerto Rican professional baseball player
- Sola Sierra (1935–1999), Chilean human rights activist
- Yohana Rodríguez Sierra (1980/1981–2026) Colombian war casualty during the 2026 United States intervention in Venezuela

== Given name ==
- Sierra Boggess (born 1982), American theater actress
- Sierra Capri (born 1998), American actress
- Sierra Cartwright (born 1963), British novelist
- Sierra Casady (born c. 1980), American musician, band member of CocoRosie
- Sierra Hull (born 1991), American musician
- Sierra Hyland (born 1995), Mexican former softball pitcher
- Sierra Strain (born 2012), American volleyball player
- Sierra Jackson (born 1992), American sprint car racer
- Sierra Katow, American stand-up comedian, actor, writer, and podcaster
- Sierra Kay (born 1990), American musician, band member of VersaEmerge
- Sierra McClain (born 1994), American actress and singer
- Sierra McCormick (born 1997), American actress
- Sierra Noble (born 1990), Canadian singer-songwriter and musician
- Sierra Romero (born 1994), Mexican-American former softball player
- Sierra Schmidt (born 1998), American competition swimmer
- Sierra St. James, one of the pen names of American writer Janette Rallison (born 1966)
- Sierra Swan (born 1978), American musician and daughter of Billy Swan
- Sierra Teller Ornelas (born 1981), Navajo and American showrunner, screenwriter, filmmaker, and weaver

== Fictional characters ==
- Leader Sierra, one of the Leaders of Team GO Rocket in Pokémon GO
- Sierra, a character in American adult animated sitcom Father of the Pride
- Sierra (Dollhouse), a character in Joss Whedon's TV series Dollhouse
- Sierra, a character in The Land Before Time VII
- Sierra, a character from the Canadian animated TV series Total Drama
- Sierra Burgess, the titular character in the Netflix movie Sierra Burgess Is a Loser
- Sierra McCoy, a character in the TV series Riverdale
- Sierra Ripoche, from Patrick McGrath's novels
- Sierra Sparkle, a character in the 2023 TV series Rubble & Crew
- Sierra Williams, a character in the Canadian TV series Catwalk
