= George Cartwright =

George Cartwright may refer to:

- George Cartwright (dramatist), British dramatist
- George Cartwright (trader) (1740–1819), British trader and explorer of Labrador
- George Cartwright (soldier) (1894–1978), Australian recipient of the Victoria Cross
- George Cartwright (soccer), former Australian international soccer player and goalkeeper
- George Cartwright (musician) (born 1950), American musician, band-leader, founder of jazz-rock band Curlew
- Buns Cartwright (George Hamilton Grahame Montagu Cartwright, 1889–1976), English cricketer and soldier
