= Representative Cartwright =

- Matt Cartwright (1961–), U.S. Representative from Pennsylvania's 8th congressional district
- John Cartwright (rugby league) (1965–), rugby league footballer, rugby league coach, and Penrith Panthers representative
- Bryce Cartwright (1994–), rugby league footballer and Penrith Panthers representative

== See also ==
- Cartwright (surname)
