= Susan Halgedahl =

American geologist

Susan L. Halgedahl
- Scientific career
- Institutions: University of Utah
- Thesis: The Dependence of Magnetic Domain Structure upon Magnetization State in Naturally-Occurring Pyrrhotite and Titanomagnetite (1981)
- Doctoral advisor: Michael Fuller

Susan Halgedahl (1946 – 2024) was a geologist known for her research into the physics that govern magnetic rocks and for her work on fossils from Utah's Wheeler Formation.

== Education and career ==
Halgedahl had a B.A.in applied physics from the University of California, San Diego (1975). She earned her Ph.D. in geological sciences from the University of California, Santa Barbara in 1981. She subsequently worked at ARCO Oil and Gas Company and Lamont-Doherty Geological Observatory before moving to the University of Utah in 1993. As of 2021, Halgedahl was an Associate Professor Emerita in the Geology and Geophysics Department at the University of Utah.

== Research ==
For her Ph.D. research, Halgedahl investigated rocks that retain their magnetic orientation, such titanomagnetite, in samples from the Ocean Drilling Program. Her Ph.D. research investigated how specific rocks retain a magnetic signal which has implications for the ability of these rocks to track changes in Earth's magnetic field over time. Her research also examined the impact of temperature on the ability of rocks to maintain their magnetic signature and how changes in the volume and chemical composition of pyrrhotite do not alter its retention of a magnetic signal. The magnetic signal in rocks can be used to reconstruct the development of the Arctic Basin over geologic time.

Halgedahl's research into fossils in the Wheeler Formation in Utah used geophysical measurements to define changes in sea level that led to the high abundance of fossils found in the region. She subsequently discovered multiple jellyfish fossils in Utah and this research extended the age of jellyfish to 505 million years ago, within the middle Cambrian era.

=== Selected publications ===
- Halgedahl, S.L.; Jarrard, R.D.; Brett, C.E.; Allison, P.A. (2009-06-01). "Geophysical and geological signatures of relative sea level change in the upper Wheeler Formation, Drum Mountains, West-Central Utah: A perspective into exceptional preservation of fossils". Palaeogeography, Palaeoclimatology, Palaeoecology. 277 (1–2): 34–56. Bibcode:2009PPP...277...34H. doi:10.1016/j.palaeo.2009.02.011. ISSN 0031-0182.
- Halgedahl, Susan L.; Jarrard, Richard D. Living With Natural Disasters: Slideshows.
- Halgedahl, Susan L. (2011), "Magnetic Domains", in Gupta, Harsh K. (ed.), Encyclopedia of Solid Earth Geophysics, Encyclopedia of Earth Sciences Series, Dordrecht: Springer Netherlands, pp. 746–757, doi:10.1007/978-90-481-8702-7_105, ISBN 978-90-481-8702-7
- Cartwright, Paulyn; Halgedahl, Susan L.; Hendricks, Jonathan R.; Jarrard, Richard D.; Marques, Antonio C.; Collins, Allen G.; Lieberman, Bruce S. (2007-10-31). "Exceptionally Preserved Jellyfishes from the Middle Cambrian". PLOS ONE. 2 (10) e1121. Bibcode:2007PLoSO...2.1121C. doi:10.1371/journal.pone.0001121. ISSN 1932-6203. PMC 2040521. PMID 17971881.

== Awards and honors ==
- Fellow, American Geophysical Union (1997)
