= John Cartwright =

John Cartwright may refer to:

- John Cartwright (political reformer) (1740–1824), supporter of American independence and British political reform
- John Cartwright (painter) (died 1811), English painter and friend of Henry Fuseli
- John Solomon Cartwright (1804–1845), Canadian businessman, lawyer, judge, farmer, and political figure
- John Campbell Cartwright (1888–1973), British philatelist
- John Robert Cartwright (1895–1979), Chief Justice of Canada
- John Cartwright (British politician) (1933–2024), British Labour and SDP Member of Parliament
- John Cartwright (footballer) (born 1940), English professional footballer with West Ham and Crystal Palace in the 1950s and 1960s
- John Cartwright (American football) (born 1946), American football player and coach as well as Baptist pastor
- John Cartwright (lawyer) (born 1957), professor of contract law at the University of Oxford
- John Cartwright (rugby league) (born 1965), Australian rugby league coach and former player
