= Sierra mountains =

Sierra is a Spanish word meaning mountain chain and saw, from Latin serra. The corresponding word in Portuguese, Catalan and Latin is serra. This name is used for various mountain ranges in Spanish-speaking and other countries (with the word serra used in Portuguese-speaking countries).

Sierra or Sierras may refer to:

== Argentina ==
- Sierras de Córdoba, in the central region of the country
- Antofagasta de la Sierra, a volcanic field
- Sierra Nevada de Lagunas Bravas, on the border of Argentina and Chile
- Sierra de la Ventana (mountains), Buenos Aires province

== Brazil ==
- Serra do Mar, in the country's southeast

== Chile ==
- Sierra Nevada (stratovolcano), La Araucanía Region
- Sierra Nevada de Lagunas Bravas, on the border of Argentina and Chile

== Colombia ==
- Sierra Nevada de Santa Marta
- Sierra Nevada del Cocuy

== Ecuador ==
- Sierra Negra (Galápagos), Galápagos Province, Ecuador

== Mexico ==
- Sierra de Juárez, Baja California
- Sierra Madre del Sur, in the country's south
- Sierra Madre Occidental, in the northwest of the country
- Sierra Madre Oriental, in the northeast of the country
- Sierra Nevada (Mexico), part of the Trans-Mexican Volcanic Belt
- Sierra San Pedro Mártir, Baja California
- Sierra Negra, Puebla, Mexico

== The Philippines ==
- Sierra Madre (Philippines), on the island of Luzon

== Portugal ==
- Serra da Estrela, in the north central region of the country
- Serra de Montejunto Protected Landscape, in the west region of the country
- Serra da Vila, in the west region of the country; see Castle of Carrazeda de Ansiães
- Serra do Socorro, in the west region of the country; see Mafra, Portugal

== Spain ==
- Sierra de Gata, in the west region of the country
- Sierra de Gredos, near the central region of the country
- Sierra de Guadarrama, in the central part of the country
- Sierra de Mijas, in the south region of the country
- Sierra Morena, in the country's south
- Sierra Nevada (Spain), in the southeast region of the country
- Sierra de la Demanda, northern Iberian Peninsula

== United States ==
- Sierra Ancha, central Arizona
- Sierra Blanca (New Mexico)
- Sierra Estrella, southwestern Arizona
- Sierra Madre Mountains (California), southwestern California
- Sierra Nevada (U.S.), California and Nevada

== Uruguay ==
- Sierra Carapé, in the central part of the country

== Venezuela ==
- Sierra Nevada de Merida

== See also ==
- High Sierra (disambiguation)
- Mountain range
- Serra (disambiguation)
- Sierra (disambiguation)
