= La Sierra =

La Sierra (Spanish for "the mountain range") may refer to:

- La Sierra (film)
- Rancho La Sierra (Sepulveda), a Mexican land grant including the present-day city of Norco and western end of the city of Riverside
  - La Sierra, California
    - La Sierra Academy, a Seventh-day Adventist K-12 school
    - La Sierra High School, a public high school
    - La Sierra University
    - Riverside – La Sierra station
- Rancho La Sierra (Yorba), a Mexican land grant including the present-day city of Corona
- La Sierra, Encrucijada, Cuba

== See also ==
- Sierra (disambiguation)
