= Fresno Air Attack Base =

Aerial firefighting base in California

Coordinates: 36°46′15.8″N 119°42′04.2″W

The Fresno Air Attack Base is an aerial firefighting base established in 1955 by the United States Forest Service (USFS) at the Fresno Yosemite International Airport. The USFS also leases space at the base to CAL FIRE, which keeps a tactical (spotter) aircraft at the base and also uses the facilities to refuel and reload retardant on air tankers and helicopters when fighting fires in the area.

== Fresno Air Base ==
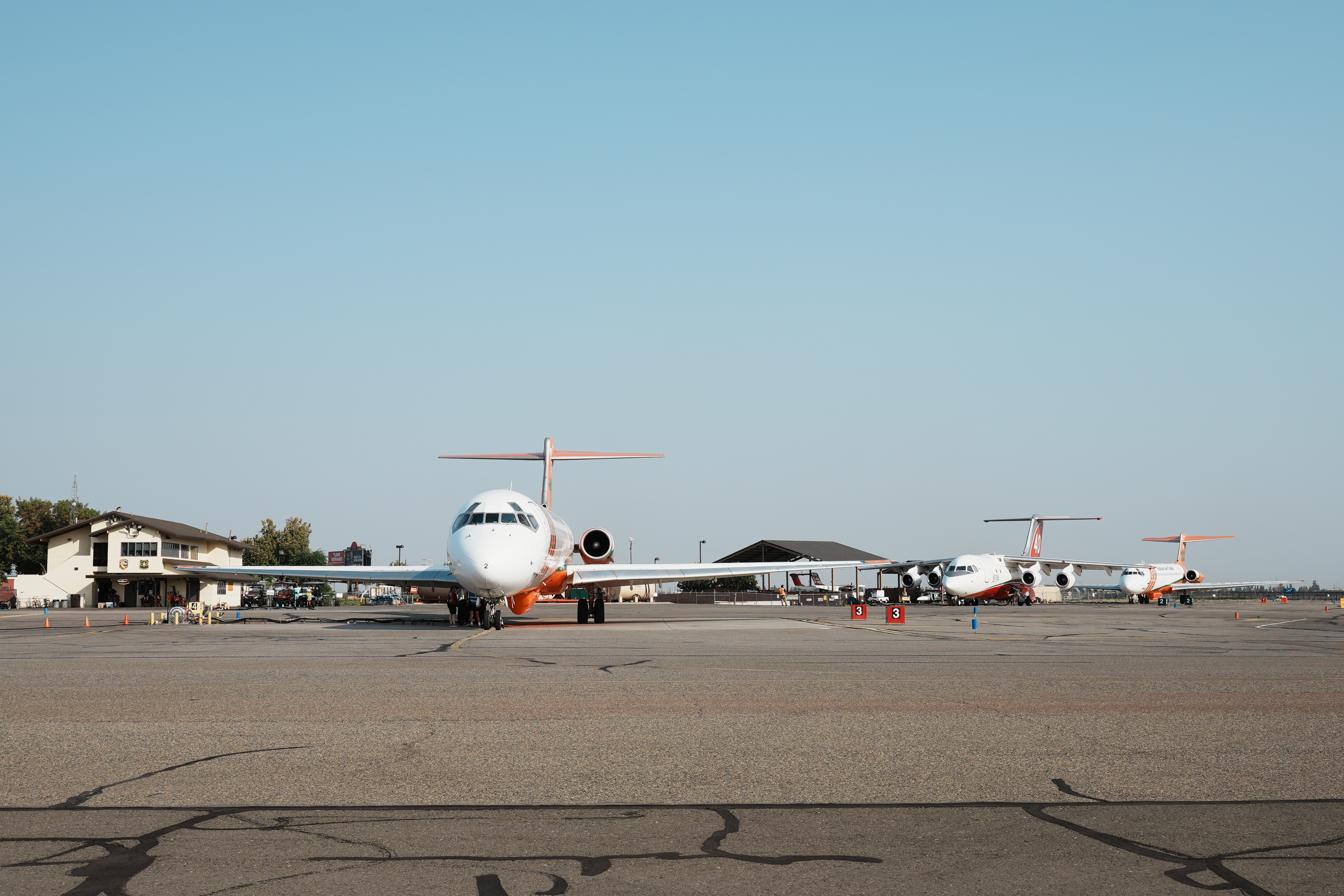
Aircraft at Fresno Air Attack Base in 2025

The Fresno Air Base responds to an average of 100 calls per year in its immediate response area which spans from the California-Nevada border to the east, Interstate 5 to the west, Merced River to the north, and Fresno-Tulare county lines to the south. On average, the base pumps about 500,000 gallons of retardant a year. With the base’s pumps, four loading pits, plus one maintenance/auxiliary pit (in a major event it can be used as a loading pit), Fresno has a possible peak output of 300,000 gallons of retardant each day. The Airbase is also approved for the Modular Airborne FireFighting System (MAFFS) with a maximum of 6 aircraft. There is sufficient aircraft parking for up to 8 aircraft at a time.

The Airbase is owned by the US Forest Service which permanently staffs the base with a Forest Aviation Officer (Division Chief), Airbase Manager (Battalion Chief), Assistant Base Manager (Captain) and a seasonal staff of three firefighters.

The US Forest service has one Air Attack Aircraft (AA15) a Rockwell Aero Commander 690A and one type 1 or one type 2 Airtanker which is only administered by the base.

In July 2012, CAL Fire Fresno-Kings Unit withdrew both personnel and aircraft from the FAAB. CAL Fire still used the base for the reloading of fire aircraft and for refueling of those aircraft. Before the start of the 2012 fire season CAL Fire leased office space and the right to use the base in an emergency and assigned a permanent staff of a Unit Air Officer (Battalion Chief), an Air Base Manager (Captain) and a seasonal staff of one Assistant Air Base Manager (Fire Apparatus Engineer (FAE)), and three firefighters.

The former CAL Fire aircraft assigned to Fresno included one North American Rockwell OV-10A Bronco Air Attack (AA430) which was relocated to McClellan Reload base to act as a statewide spare air attack aircraft. The remaining Grumman Marsh S-2F3AT Turbo Tracker air tanker(T78) was relocated to Porterville.

== Fresno Emergency Communication/Command Center ==
The Fresno Emergency Communication/Command Center (ECC) is an interagency facility located at the Fresno Air Attack Base. It is jointly operated by the US Forest Service and CAL Fire.

The US Forest Service uses the ECC for the Sierra NF Emergency Communication Center and the US Fish & Wildlife Service for the San Luis National Wildlife Refuge Complex.

CAL Fire uses the ECC for its Fresno-Kings Unit, Fresno County Fire, Fowler City, Laton Volunteer Fire Department, Riverdale Public Utilities District, Orange Cove Fire, Auberry Volunteer Fire, Bald Mountain Fire, Shaver Lake Volunteer Fire, Huntington Lake Volunteer Fire, Big Creek Volunteer Fire, Mountain Valley Volunteer Fire, Pine Ridge Volunteers, and Pleasant Valley State Prison Fire Department. They also have contracts for fire protection within the Cities of Mendota, Huron, and Parlier. Between 1995 and 2000 the ECC provided consolidated Regional Fire Dispatch Services to the Fresno Fire Department. Along with these departments, there is also the California Governor's Office of Emergency Services (OES) coordination center for the Fresno County Operational Area, and OES Region V, which covers Fresno, Kings, Kern, Tulare, Madera, Merced, and Mariposa counties. As the coordination center, the personnel are tasked to request local government support for major incidents throughout the state, and even the country if needed. In 2007, the ECC processed 16,607 events of which 13,629 were emergency incidents within its area of responsibility.

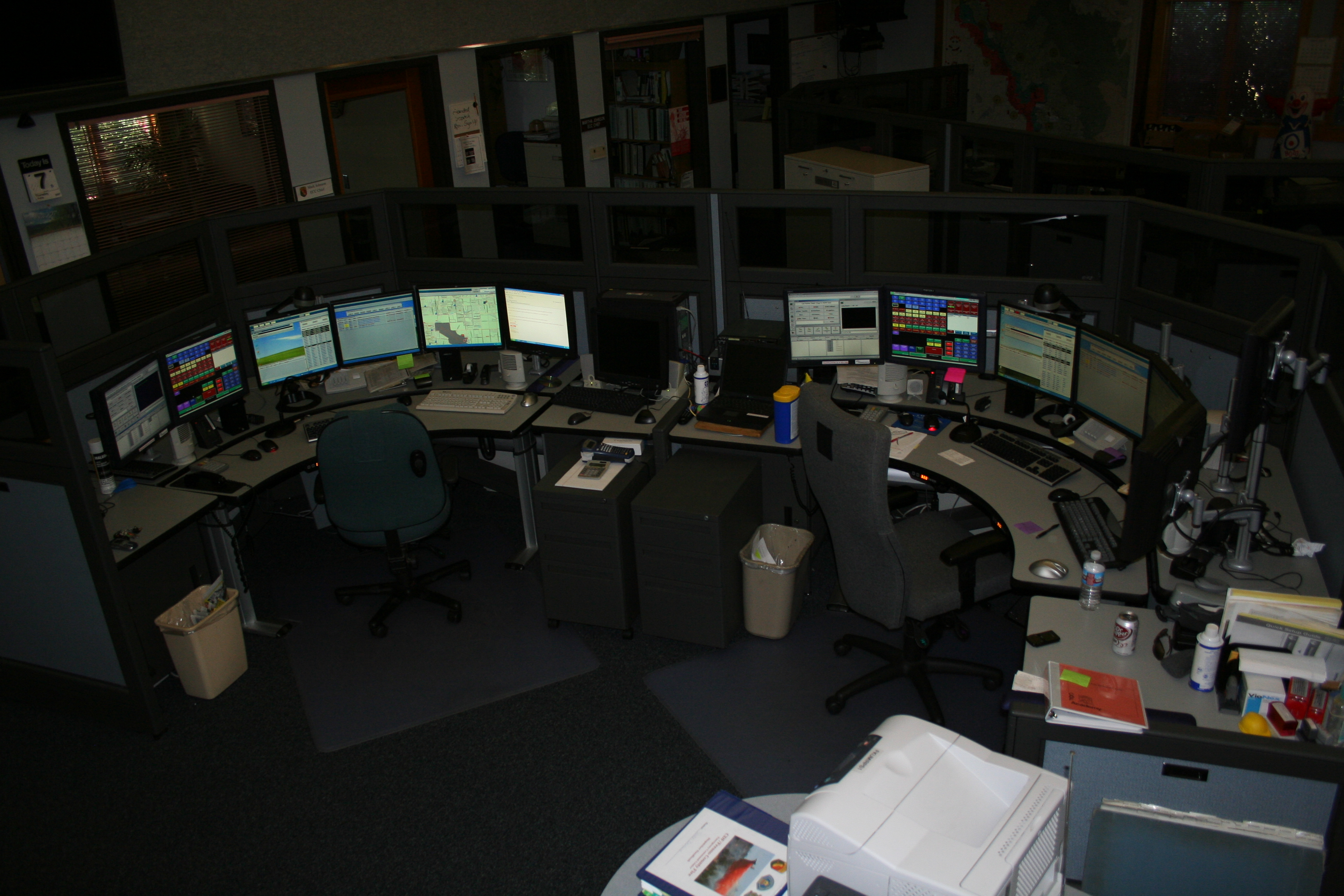
Fresno ECC 2 CAL Fire Dispatch Consoles

=== CAL Fire Dispatch Stations ===
In 2007, CAL Fire completed a 1.2 million dollar remodel which equipped the ECC with Northrop Grummans' CommandPoint Computer-assisted dispatch (CAD) system that automatically recommends equipment response to a call once received via 911 or radio. The monitors on the adjacent picture (from left to right) comprise the computer controlled telephone system. This system controls 8 911 lines, 7 seven digit emergency lines, 6 direct dial (ring down) lines to other local agencies, and 11 business lines. The second monitor is the computer radio touch screen. This screen is where personnel monitor 32 different frequencies. They also "tone out" the fire stations from this screen with the touch of a finger. The next three screens are part of the CAD system. These screens have display different windows within the CAD system including a map, equipment status, and incident information. The next monitor on the right is a work station where personnel can complete reports and other tasks as needed. Some stations also have an additional Radio Control computer that is tied into the Fresno County Emergency Medical Services Communications System. This system allows fire dispatchers to communicate with Fresno County EMS ambulances. There are 4 identical consoles on the command floor, with one additional console available in "expanded" when an incident becomes very large and requires dedicated personnel.

=== Forest Service Dispatch Stations ===
The Forest Service's four dispatch stations use the same software for telephone and radio control as the CAL Fire stations. The monitors are arranged from left to right: one computer controlled telephone system touchscreen monitor, one computer controlled radio touchscreen monitor, one computer-assisted dispatch (CAD) monitor. The Forest Service uses software from Bighorn Information Systems for Fire Planning (IIAA, FireBudget), Fire Prevention (PWA, WPAP, BuildFBD), Aircraft Management (AMIS, AUTOAT), Fuels Management (FORBS, FATE), Historical Fire Analysis (PCHA), Computer-Aided Dispatch (WildCAD), GIS Utilities Legal<->Lat/Lon<->UTM), Readiness Review (READY), Fire Cache Management (CACHE) and Weed Abatement Model Concept and the last monitor is a workstation for reports and other tasks. One of the dispatch stations also has access to the Fresno County Emergency Medical Services Communications System and another station has a dedicated notebook computer with access to the National Law Enforcement Telecommunications System (NLETS), the National Crime Information Center (NCIC), the Criminal Justice Information System (CJIS), the California Law Enforcement Telecommunications System (CLETS), the California Department of Motor Vehicle (CalDMV) and the Oregon Law Enforcement Data System (LEDS).
