= Sierra Madre =

Sierra Madre (Spanish, 'mother mountain range') may refer to:

== Places and mountains ==
=== Mexico ===
- Sierra Madre Occidental, a mountain range in northwestern Mexico and southern Arizona
- Sierra Madre Oriental, a mountain range in northeastern Mexico
- Sierra Madre de Oaxaca, a mountain range in south-central Mexico
- Sierra Madre del Sur, a mountain range in southern Mexico

=== Central America ===
- Sierra Madre, known in Mexico as Sierra Madre de Chiapas, a mountain range which extends from southeastern Mexico and crosses southern Guatemala, northern El Salvador, and western Honduras

=== Philippines ===
- Sierra Madre (Philippines), a mountain range on Luzon island

=== United States ===
- Sierra Madre Mountains (California), a mountain range in the state of California
  - Sierra Madre Fault Zone, at the boundary to the San Gabriel Valley and San Fernando Valley
  - 1991 Sierra Madre earthquake
- Sierra Madre, California, a town in Los Angeles County located at the foot of the San Gabriel Mountains
  - Sierra Madre Boulevard
  - Sierra Madre Villa station, Los Angeles Metro Rail A Line station.
  - Sierra Madre Line, a former railway line
- Sierra Madre Range (Wyoming), a mountain range in the south central portion of the state

== Other uses ==
- Sierra Madre sparrow, Xenospiza baileyi, an endangered American bird
- Sierra Madre ground squirrel, Callospermophilus madrensis, a species of rodent
- Sierra Madre Casino, a fictional location in the Fallout: New Vegas video game
- BRP Sierra Madre (LT-57), a Philippine Navy ship formerly USS Harnett County (LST-821), deliberately run aground on the Second Thomas Shoal of the Spratly Islands

== See also ==
- Sierra (disambiguation)
- The Treasure of the Sierra Madre, a 1927 novel
  - The Treasure of the Sierra Madre (film), 1948 film made from the novel
