= Sierra Sky Park Airport =

Coordinates: 36°50′25″N 119°52′10″W

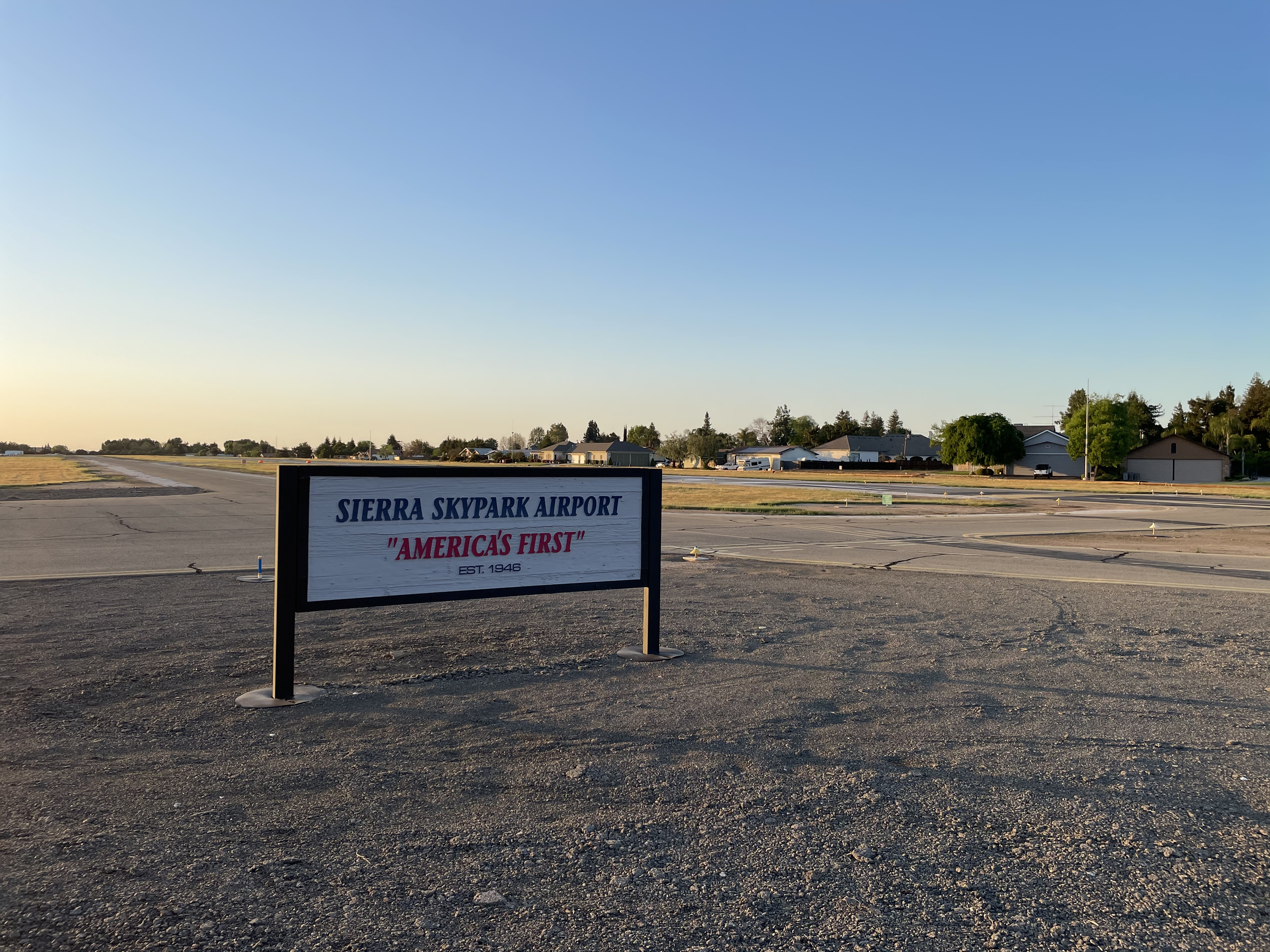
- IATA: none; ICAO: none; FAA LID: E79

Summary
- Airport type: Privately-owned, public-use
- Owner: Herndon-Doolittle Association
- Serves: Fresno, California
- Elevation AMSL: 321 ft (98 m)
- Interactive map of Sierra Sky Park Airport

Runways
Direction	Length		Surface
Direction	ft	m	Surface
12/30	2,920	890	Asphalt

Statistics (2007)
- Aircraft operations: 12,500
- Based aircraft: 40
- Source: Federal Aviation Administration

Sierra Sky Park Airport (FAA LID: E79, formerly Q60) is a privately owned, public-use airport seven miles (11 km; 6.1 nmi) northwest of the central business district of Fresno, a city in Fresno County, California, United States. Established in 1946, it is recognized as the first residential aviation community (airpark) in the world, where residents can land, taxi down extra-wide neighborhood streets, and park their aircraft directly at their home.

Nearby airports include Fresno Chandler Executive Airport and Fresno Yosemite International Airport.

== History ==
The Sierra Sky Park neighborhood was established in 1946 on 130 acres (53 ha) along the San Joaquin River. On October 23 of that year, William and Doris Smilie filed a subdivision plan with Fresno County creating a central runway surrounded by residential lots, each with permanent easements guaranteeing access to the runway. At the time, the site was several miles outside Fresno, surrounded by fig orchards and fields of cotton and alfalfa.

The first home was built in 1952, and the Smilie's themselves moved in. Their concept was distinctive: residents could land, taxi along 60-to-80-foot-wide (18 to 24 m) streets, and park aircraft in driveways or hangars attached to their homes. The community included several unique design features such as low street signs, tip-over mailboxes to minimize damage from wing strikes, and setbacks to accommodate aircraft wings. Streets were named for aviation figures such as Carl Spaatz, James Doolittle and David McCampbell.

Because the concept was unprecedented, new state legislation was required. In 1963, the California legislature amended the vehicle code to allow aircraft to taxi on residential streets within registered airparks.

Sierra Sky Park was widely reported in the press and became a model for similar developments. More than 500 residential airparks worldwide trace their origins to the concept, and the Smilie's were later consulted on airpark projects in the United States and abroad. In 1996, the 50th anniversary of the community, a monument was dedicated to the Smilie's.

== Facilities and aircraft ==
The airport portion of the community covers an area of 34 acres (14 ha) and contains one runway designated 12/30, with an asphalt surface measuring 2,473 by 50 feet (754 m × 15 m). For the 12-month period ending March 29, 2007, the airport had 12,500 general aviation operations, an average of 34 per day. At that time, there were 40 aircraft based at the airport: 98 percent single-engine and 2 percent multi-engine.

Sierra Sky Park hosts the Skies of Dreams aviation education program. This program provides high school students with hands-on experience in building an experimental aircraft. Students learn about engineering, aviation, and teamwork while working with mentors from the Experimental Aircraft Association (EAA).

== Accidents and incidents ==
On December 26, 2016, an Express Series 90 crashed onto the shore of a lake, 820 feet (250 m) off runway 12. Both people on board were killed.

On May 2, 2020, the engine of a Cessna 172 failed after takeoff. During the return landing, the aircraft overran the end of the runway. The pilot sustained minor injuries, and no one on the ground was harmed.
