= D. F. Cartwright =

British fisherman

D.F. Cartwright
- Born: 28 December 1916
- Died: 28 December 2009 (aged 93)
- Allegiance: United Kingdom
- Service / branch: British Army
- Rank: Major
- Battles / wars: Second World War

D.F. Cartwright, also known as Tony Cartwright MBE MC (28 December 1916 – 28 December 2009) was one of the people who revived Lowestoft's North Sea commercial fishing industry after the Second World War.

He had an heroic war record, winning a Military Cross (MC) and rising to the rank of Major. He was the grandson of Fred Spashett, an ex-mayor of Lowestoft and Lloyd's agent, who together with his son George Spashett, who had also won an MC in the First World War, had built up a large business in the port, but which had been decimated by the second war and the early death of George Spashett.

Together with Bill Suddaby, Maurice Hepton and Gordon Claridge, Cartwright built up a Lowestoft fishing fleet of some 130 vessels reaching its peak in the 1960s, employing some 1,500 fishermen and giving employment to marine engineers, fish merchants and processors, ship chandlers, net manufacturers, electronic and wireless workers, fuel suppliers and a host of other suppliers. It was reckoned that half the population of Lowesroft was dependent on the sea.
