= Virginia Cartwright =

American artist (born 1943)

- Born: 1943 (age 82–83); Pasadena, Los Angeles, California, U.S.
- Education: California State University, Long Beach, Rochester Institute of Technology
- Occupation: Ceramist
- Website: Official website

Virginia Cartwright (1943-2025) was an American ceramic artist.

== Biography ==
She studied at California State University, Long Beach (BA degree); School for American Craftsmen at Rochester Institute of Technology (MFA degree) under Frans Wildenhain; as well as at Pond Farm in Guerneville, California; and Haystack Mountain School of Crafts. The first four years of her career she spent working on the wheel, and afterwards she moved to working in hand and slab-build, primarily utilitarian works.

Her work is included in the collections of the Los Angeles County Museum of Art, the Nora Eccles Harrison Museum of Art and the Smithsonian American Art Museum.
