= William Cartwright =

William Cartwright may refer to:

- William Cartwright (dramatist) (1611–1643), English dramatist and churchman
- William Cartwright (1634–1676), English politician who sat in the House of Commons in 1659
- William Cartwright (actor) (died 1686), English actor
- William Cartwright (c.1704–1768), English Member of Parliament for Northamptonshire
- William Cartwright (British Army officer, died 1827) (c. 1754–1827), British general
- William Cartwright (British Army officer, died 1873), British general
- William Cartwright (film editor) (1920–2013), American television and film director, producer and editor
- William Cartwright (Bahamian politician) (c. 1923–2012), Bahamian politician and co-founder of the Progressive Liberal Party
- William Cornwallis Cartwright (1825–1915), British Member of Parliament for Oxfordshire, 1868–1885
- William Ralph Cartwright (1771–1847), English landowner and Tory politician who sat in the House of Commons between 1797 and 1846

== See also ==
- Bill Cartwright (disambiguation)
