= Thomas Cartwright =

Thomas Cartwright may refer to:

- Thomas Cartwright (bishop) (1634–1689), nonjuring Bishop of Chester
- Thomas Cartwright (diplomat) (1795–1850), British envoy to the Netherlands and Sweden
- Thomas Cartwright (politician) (1671–1748), English MP for Northamptonshire 1695–1698 and 1701–1748
- Thomas Cartwright (stonemason) (c. 1635–1703), English stonemason, building contractor and sculptor
- Thomas Cartwright (theologian) (c. 1535–1603), English Puritan churchman
- Tom Cartwright (1935–2007), English cricketer
