= Bill Cartwright (footballer, born 1922) =

English footballer

Personal information
- Full name: William John Cartwright
- Date of birth: 11 June 1922
- Place of birth: Malpas, England
- Date of death: June 1992 (aged 69–70)
- Place of death: Birkenhead, England
- Position: Wing half

Senior career*
Years	Team	Apps	(Gls)
1946–1948	Tranmere Rovers	9	(1)
- * Club domestic league appearances and goals

William John Cartwright (11 June 1922 – June 1992) was an English footballer, who played as a wing half in the Football League for Tranmere Rovers.
