= James Cartwright (disambiguation) =

James Cartwright (born 1949) is a United States Marine Corps general.

James Cartwright may also refer to:

- James H. Cartwright (1842–1924), American jurist
- James Cartwright (actor) (born 1984), English actor
- James Cartwright (canoeist) (born 1976), Canadian canoer#
- Jim Cartwright (born 1958), English dramatist
- Bill Cartwright (James William Cartwright, born 1957), American basketball player and coach

== See also ==
- Jamie Hunter Cartwright
