= Joseph Cartwright =

Joseph or Joe Cartwright may refer to:

- Joseph Cartwright (artist) (1789–1829), English marine painter
- Joe Cartwright (rugby league) (1890–1949), English rugby league footballer of the 1910s and 1920s
- Little Joe Cartwright, a character on the American TV series Bonanza
- Joe Cartwright (footballer) (1888–1955), English footballer
