= Peter Cartwright =

Peter Cartwright may refer to:

- Peter Cartwright (revivalist) (1785–1872), American revivalist and politician
- Peter Cartwright (actor) (1935–2013), South African-born British actor
- Peter Cartwright (lawyer) (1940–2019), husband of the former Governor-General of New Zealand, Silvia Cartwright, and chair of the Broadcasting Standards Authority
- Peter Cartwright (footballer) (born 1957), English footballer
- Peter Cartwright (film editor) on The Angelic Conversation
- Peter Cartwright (ice hockey) in 2011 AIHL season
