= Ben Cartwright =

Ben Cartwright may refer to:

- Ben Cartwright (actor) (born 1976), British television actor, active since 2001
- Ben Cartwright (character), a cattle rancher played by Lorne Greene in the American western television show Bonanza, 1959–1973
