= Richard Cartwright =

Richard Cartwright may refer to:

- Richard Cartwright (Loyalist) (1759–1815), businessman, judge and political figure in Upper Canada
- Sir Richard John Cartwright (1835–1912), Canadian Member of Parliament and Senator
- Richard Cartwright (bishop) (1913–2009), Bishop of Plymouth in the Church of England
- Richard Cartwright (philosopher) (1925–2010), American philosopher
- Richard Cartwright (murderer) (1974–2005), executed in Texas in 2005
