= Mrs H. Cartwright =

Novelist

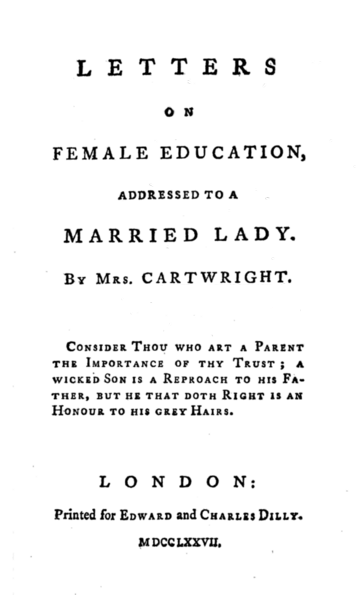
Title page for Mrs. Cartwright's Letters on Female Education, 1777

Mrs H. Cartwright (fl. 1776 – 1787) was a novelist who also wrote a book of advice about educating girls.

Cartwright's first publication, Letters on Female Education, addressed to a Married Lady (1777), offers advice to a mother on how to bring up her daughters. It was translated into German in 1778 alongside works by Hannah More and Hester Chapone. One critic wrote, "These letters have as much originality in them as we generally find in compositions of this nature. At least they discover the indications of a rational understanding and good heart." In the preface, Cartwright claims that she had been encouraged in this project by Elizabeth Montagu, an advocate for women's education and a leading figure in the London literary world. The author ends her remarks with the address "Warwick Court": presumably Warwick Court in Bloomsbury, London. This address is one of the few personal details known about Cartwright.

One of Cartwright's novels, The Platonic Marriage (1786), was used by Mary Wollstonecraft to illustrate the foolish and unwholesome reading tastes of a silly character in her own novel Mary. Since the plot involves a young man falling improbably in love with his grandmother-in-law, it can also be taken as a challenge to the practice of marrying young girls to much older men. The Platonic Marriage attracted sarcastic reviews but one critic, at least, felt it demonstrated "tolerable skill and address".

Most of Cartwright's fiction is epistolary: the story is told through correspondence. Contemporary reviews, though by no means full of praise, suggest that her novels were considered entertaining. The Duped Guardian, or, The Amant Malade (1785) was described by the Monthly Review as a book where "the construction is inartificial [constructed without art or skill], and the catastrophe is particularly confused; but the work is neither tedious nor insipid; it may afford amusement to please an idle mind, and instruction to warn a thoughtless one."

Other novels of hers were The Memoirs of Lady Eliza Audley (1779), Letters Moral and Entertaining (1780), and The Generous Sister (1780).

The Vale of Glendor, or, Memoirs of Emily Westbrook (1785) is attributed to Mrs. Cartwright, but it gave Emily Westbrook's name as the author on the title page. There is a note from "the editor" saying that "having found them among some papers of the deceased relation, she thought they contain some moral reflection that might convey instruction".
