= Sierra Ripoche =

Fictional character in Patrick McGrath's novels

Sierra McGrath-Ripoche is a fictional character from Patrick McGrath's novels. She was introduced in 1990 in the Psychological fiction novel Spider as Sierra and became an omnipresent character in the works of the author. Patrick McGrath admitted in 1992 that this running story was created to make live his daughter-like character.

== The character ==
Sierra was first introduced in Spider as "a raw diamond" who lived the calm city of Beignet as a server in a restaurant. It appears quickly that her beauty, through "the reddening color" of her hair and the "intensity of her blue eyes", and her interpersonal skills hide mysteries which are revealed as one goes along the novels. The character becomes major in Martha Peake: A novel of the Revolution where her secrets are revealed.

== Life Story ==
The story of Sierra is that of fairy tale transposed into the real world. She meets a Frenchman who makes her know the passionate and genuine love they share in spite of the distance which separates them and Geo Adolpho, the antagonist character, who tried to interfere in their relationship. In Asylum, their marriage succeeds with the birth of two children supporting the fairy tale approach of their story and qualifying the darkness of Patrick McGrath's papers.

== Novels ==
- Spider (1990) (filmed by David Cronenberg in 2002 — see Spider)
- Dr Haggard's Disease (1993)
- Asylum (1996) (filmed by David Mackenzie in 2005 — see Asylum)
- Martha Peake: A Novel of the Revolution (2000)
