= High Sierra =

High Sierra may refer to:

== Places ==
- High Sierra (biome), a region of California
- Sierra Nevada (U.S.), a mountain range in California also called the High Sierra or High Sierras
  - High Sierra Trail, which crosses the Sierra Nevada

== Arts, entertainment, and media ==
- High Sierra (film), 1941
- High Sierra Music Festival, held in Quincy, California since 1991
- John Muir's High Sierra, an Oscar-nominated short documentary

== Computing and technology ==
- High Sierra Format, a CD-ROM filesystem developed in 1986
- macOS High Sierra, an operating system for Apple computers

== Other uses ==
- High Sierra, an American outdoor brand owned by luggage manufacturer Samsonite International

== See also ==
- Sierra mountains (disambiguation)
