= List of ships named Sierra =

A number of ships have been named Sierra including:

== Merchant ships ==
- Sierra (1900), an American trans-Pacific passenger liner, which also served as USS Sierra
- Sierra (1944), an American cargo ship between 1947 and 1961, formerly United States Navy attack cargo ship USS Stokes (AKA-68)

== Whaling ships ==
- Sierra (1960), a whaling vessel between 1960-1980 (originally named Robert W. Vinke (AM-4)). Bought and converted by private owners into a whale factory/catcher hybrid vessel in 1967-68, pirate whaler between 1968-1979, sunk in Lisbon harbor on February 6th, 1980 with no casualties.

== Naval ships ==
- USS Sierra (ID-1634), the former merchant ship Sierra, built 1900, in commission as a troop transport from 1918 to 1919
- USS Sierra (AD-18), a destroyer tender in commission from 1944 to 1994
- Sierra-class corvette, a ship class of the Mexican Navy
- Sierra-class submarine, a Russian class of nuclear-powered attack submarines
