= Anthony Cartwright (cricketer) =

New Zealand cricketer (1940–2023)

Personal information
- Full name: Anthony George Cartwright
- Born: 8 August 1940; Timaru, South Canterbury, New Zealand
- Died: 6 May 2023 (aged 82); Dunedin, Otago, New Zealand
- Batting: Right-handed
- Bowling: Right-arm medium
- Role: Bowler

Domestic team information
- Years: Team
- 1960/61–1975/76: North Otago
- 1961/62–1963/64: Otago

Career statistics
Competition	First-class
Matches	6
Runs scored	48
Batting average	5.33
100s/50s	0/0
Top score	15
Balls bowled	1,196
Wickets	11
Bowling average	35.27
5 wickets in innings	0
10 wickets in match	0
Best bowling	3/27
Catches/stumpings	2/–
- Source: CricketArchive, 27 February 2024

Anthony George Cartwright (8 August 1940 – 6 May 2023) was a New Zealand cricketer who played six first-class matches for Otago in the Plunket Shield between the 1961–62 and 1963–64 seasons. He also played for North Otago in 13 Hawke Cup matches between the 1960–61 and 1975–76 seasons.

Cartwright was born at Timaru, South Canterbury in 1940. He played as a right-handed batsman and right-arm medium pace bowler, scoring 48 first-class runs and taking 11 wickets, with best bowling figures of 3/27. He played club cricket as an all-rounder for Oamaru Cricket Club, and was described as "a lively and accurate bowler who moved the ball both in the air and off the track". He was "regularly the leading wicket-taker in North Otago" and was appointed a life member of the club. He died at Dunedin in May 2023 aged 82.
