= Philip Cartwright =

English cricketer (1880–1955)

Personal information
- Full name: Philip Cartwright
- Born: 26 September 1880; Gibraltar
- Died: 21 November 1955 (aged 75); Virginia Water, Surrey, England
- Batting: Left-handed
- Bowling: Left-arm medium

Domestic team information
- Years: Team
- 1905–1922: Sussex

Career statistics
Competition	First-class
Matches	84
Runs scored	2,463
Batting average	19.39
100s/50s	1/12
Top score	101
Balls bowled	938
Wickets	16
Bowling average	34.18
5 wickets in innings	–
10 wickets in match	–
Best bowling	3/29
Catches/stumpings	36/–
- Source: Cricinfo, 30 March 2013

Philip Cartwright (26 September 1880 – 21 November 1955) was an English cricketer who played all of his first-class cricket for Sussex. Cartwright played for the county prior to the First World War and briefly after it, making 84 appearances. He was a left-handed batsman who bowled left-arm medium pace.

== Career and life ==
Born in Gibraltar, Cartwright made his first-class debut for Sussex against Derbyshire in the 1905 County Championship, with him making two further appearances in that season against Nottinghamshire and Northamptonshire. His next first-class appearance for Sussex didn't come until the 1909 County Championship when he appeared against Nottinghamshire. Cartwright made 27 further first-class appearances in the 1909 season, which was to be his most successful in first-class cricket: he scored 833 runs at an average of 24.80, with five half centuries and a single century score of 101 against Leicestershire. This was to be the only first-class century he made in his career.

He made 21 first-class appearances in the 1910 County Championship, however he was not as successful with the bat when compared to 1909, scoring 651 runs at an average of 18.60, with two half century scores and a high score of 83. The following season Cartwright made just a single first-class appearance in the 1911 County Championship against Leicestershire. He returned for the 1912 season to make regular first-class appearances, with fifteen appearances in the 1912 County Championship, in which he scored a total of 548 runs at an average of 22.83, with three half centuries and a high score of 75. His form dipped in his eleven first-class appearances in 1913, with him scoring 329 runs at an average of 16.45, with two half centuries and a high score of 70. He made one first-class appearance in the 1914 County Championship against Gloucestershire. Following the First World War, in which no first-class cricket was played, Cartwright returned to play for Sussex three seasons after the resumption of County Cricket, making three first-class appearances in the 1922 County Championship against Kent, Nottinghamshire and Hampshire, although he made little impact, scoring 22 runs across the three fixtures. Cartwright made a total of 84 first-class appearances for Sussex, scoring 2,463 runs at an average of 19.39. Taking 39 catches in the field, he also took sixteen wickets with his part—time medium pace bowling, at a bowling average of 34.18, with best figures of 34.18.

He was afflicted with mental illness later in his life, with him dying at Holloway Sanatorium for the insane at Virginia Water, Surrey on 21 November 1955.

== Playing style ==
His playing style was described in his obituary in the 1956 Wisden Cricketers' Almanack as: "He [Cartwright] is far better than his somewhat peculiar style might lead one to suppose".
