= John Cartwright (painter) =

English painter (died 1811)

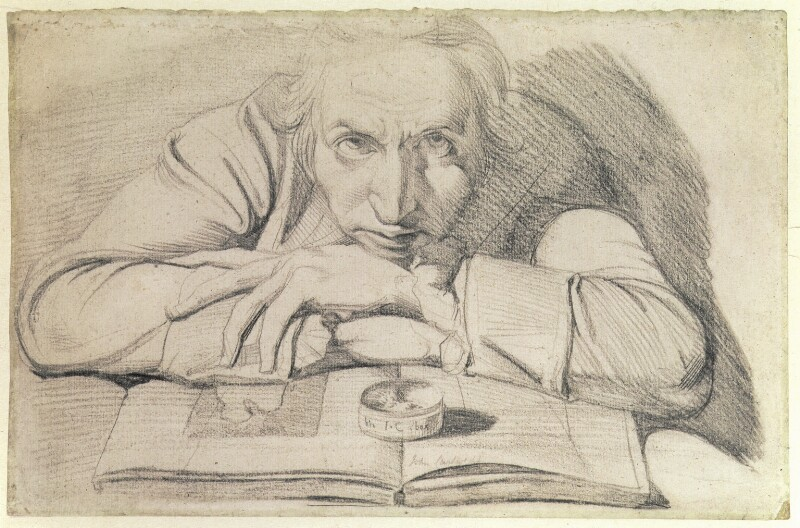
Probable portrait of John Cartwright, black chalk drawing by Henry Fuseli (c. 1779)

John Cartwright (fl. 1763–1808; died 1811) was an English painter.

== Career ==
John Cartwright was a member of the Free Society of Artists, and in 1763 signed the deed of enrolment of that society. He went to Rome to prosecute his artistic studies, and there became acquainted with Henry Fuseli. On his return to England he resided for several years at 100 St. Martin's Lane, and when Fuseli returned to England from Rome in 1779 he for some time shared part of Cartwright's house. Cartwright became a great personal friend of Fuseli, who gave him many hints, and occasionally assistance in his work. His historical pictures show much of Fuseli's influence. He exhibited at the Royal Academy from 1784 to 1808; his pictures were not confined to any one class of subject, but represented landscapes, historical and domestic subjects, and principally portraits.

== Sources ==
- Graves, Algernon (1884). A Dictionary of Artists Who Have Exhibited Works in the Principal London Exhibitions of Oil Paintings From 1760 to 1880. London: George Bell and Sons. p. 42.
- Oliver, Valerie Cassel, ed. (2011). "Cartwright, John". Benezit Dictionary of Artists. Oxford University Press. Retrieved 16 September 2022.
- Redgrave, Richard; Redgrave, Samuel (1866). A Century of Painters of the English School. Vol. 1. London: Smith, Elder and Co. p. 279.
- Redgrave, Samuel (1874). "Cartwright, John". A Dictionary of Artists of the English School. London: Longmans, Green, and Co. p. 71.
- Weinglass, D. H. (2004). "Cartwright, John (d. 1811), painter". Oxford Dictionary of National Biography. Oxford University Press. Retrieved 16 September 2022.
- "John Cartwright (active 1778-1808), Painter". National Portrait Gallery. Retrieved 16 September 2022.

Attribution:

- This article incorporates text from a publication now in the public domain: Cust, Lionel Henry (1887). "Cartwright, John (fl.1763-1808)". In Stephen, Leslie (ed.). Dictionary of National Biography. Vol. 9. London: Smith, Elder & Co. p. 224.
