= Snow Ghosts =

British musical group

- Also known as: Throwing Snow; Augustus Ghost; The Keep
- Years active: 2008–present
- Label: Houndstooth
- Members: Ross Tones; Hannah Cartwright; Oliver Knowles
- Website: snowghosts.net

Snow Ghosts is a British musical group active since 2008. As of 2020, they have released four studio albums and four EPs.

== History ==
Producer Ross Tones (a.k.a. Throwing Snow) and vocalist Hannah Cartwright (a.k.a. Augustus Ghost) first met and started collaborating in 2008, having a shared interest in British folklore and experimental electronic music.

The first Snow Ghosts record, the Lost at Sea EP, was released through Black Acre Records in 2011. Following this initial release, Tones and Cartwright spent the next two years compiling their debut album, A Small Murmuration, which was released on London nightclub Fabric's record label Houndstooth in 2013.

In 2014, Tones and Cartwright joined forces with multi-instrumentalist Oliver Knowles, (a.k.a. the Keep), and Snow Ghosts became a trio. The band's second album, A Wrecking, was released on Houndstooth in February 2015.

In March 2015, Snow Ghosts embarked on a UK and Ireland tour with Portico, which saw them play in cities including London, Bristol, Manchester, and Dublin.

== Commercial use of music ==
- August 2013 – "And the World Was Gone" – episode 10 ("The Overlooked"), season 3 of Teen Wolf
- July 2015 – "Held the Light" – Channel 4 trailer for Witnesses
- December 2015 – "The Hunted" – first official trailer for X-Men: Apocalypse
- February 2016 – "Lost at Sea" – Channel 4 trailer for Thicker Than Water
- March 2016 – "Circles Out of Salt" – season 2, How to Get Away with Murder

== Discography ==
Studio albums

- A Small Murmuration (2013)
- A Wrecking (2015)
- Husk (2016)
- A Quiet Ritual (2019)
- The Fell (2023)

EPs

- Lost at Sea (2011)
- And the World Was Gone (2013)
- Secret Garden (2013)
- Real World Sessions (2020)

Singles

- "Murder Cries" (2013)
- "The Fleet" (2015)
- "The Hunted" (2015)
- "Lied" (2016)
- "Vetiver" (2016)
