= John Campbell Cartwright =

British postal historian

John Campbell Cartwright (9 March 1888 – 1973) was a British philatelist who was added to the Roll of Distinguished Philatelists in 1956.
