= George Cartwright (dramatist) =

British dramatist

- Occupation: Dramatist

George Cartwright (fl. 1661) was a British dramatist.

== Biography ==
Cartwright was the author of a solitary tragedy entitled ‘The Heroick Lover, or the Infanta of Spain,’ London, 1661, 8vo, dedicated to Charles II. It was presumably unacted. The scene is Poland, and the author speaks of it as ‘a poem consisting more of fatal truth than flying fancy.’ It is in rhymed verse, and is in all respects a poor production. Cartwright is unmentioned by Gerard Langbaine, Winstanley, and Phillips. The first reference to him occurs in Gildon's addition to Langbaine, 1699, where it is said that the author ‘has writ a play called “Heroick Love,”’ a mistake copied by succeeding writers, and that he ‘lived at Fulham.’
