= Buns Cartwright =

English cricketer and soldier

Personal information
- Full name: George Hamilton Grahame Montagu Cartwright
- Born: 23 April 1889; Westminster, London, England
- Died: 4 August 1976 (aged 87); Westminster, London, England
- Nickname: Buns
- Batting: Right-handed
- Bowling: Right-arm fast-medium

Domestic team information
- Years: Team
- 1909–1910: Oxford University

Career statistics
Competition	First-class
Matches	17
Runs scored	523
Batting average	22.73
100s/50s	0/3
Top score	65 not out
Balls bowled	1831
Wickets	32
Bowling average	35.71
5 wickets in innings	0
10 wickets in match	0
Best bowling	4/79
Catches/stumpings	2/–
- Source: Cricinfo, 20 November 2018

Lt.-Col. George Hamilton Grahame Montagu "Buns" Cartwright (23 April 1889 – 4 August 1976) was an English first-class cricketer and soldier.

== Life and career ==
"Buns" Cartwright, as he was usually known, was educated at Eton and New College, Oxford. He played for Oxford University in 1909 and 1910 but did not win a Blue.

In the First World War he served in France as a lieutenant-colonel in the Coldstream Guards and was mentioned in dispatches. After the war he was for a time Patronage Secretary to Lord Birkenhead, when Birkenhead was Lord Chancellor. The duties of the position included assessing young clergymen for their suitability as curates.

Cartwright played a few first-class matches for Free Foresters and Marylebone Cricket Club between the end of the war and 1928. He was Secretary of the Eton Ramblers, the cricket club for Old Etonians, from 1919 to 1955, and President of the club from 1955 until his death in 1976. He was also President of The Cricketer for many years.

He remained a bachelor all his life, but according to E. W. Swanton was "far from unappreciative of female company". In another understatement Swanton noted that Cartwright "was seldom known to withhold any remark that came into his mind".
