= Paulyn Cartwright =

American evolutionary biologist

- Education: Yale University
- Scientific career
- Thesis: Characterization of a Hox gene, Cnox-2, and the evolution of coloniality in the hydrozoa (Phylum Cnidaria) (1998)

Paulyn Cartwright is the Baumgartner Professor of Biology at the University of Kansas. She is known for her research on the evolution and development of jellyfish.

== Education and career ==
Cartwright received her undergraduate degree in biology from the University of California, Los Angeles in 1990. She earned a Ph.D. from the biology department at Yale University in 1997.

== Research ==
Cartwright is known for her research on the evolution of jellyfish, particularly cnidarians. Her early work examined Hox genes in the horseshoe crab and in hydroids. Her subsequent research examined myxozoa, or aquatic parasites related to cnidarians, and the evolution of cnidarians. In 2007, Cartwright led a research project that found fossils of jellyfish that date to the Middle Cambrian period.

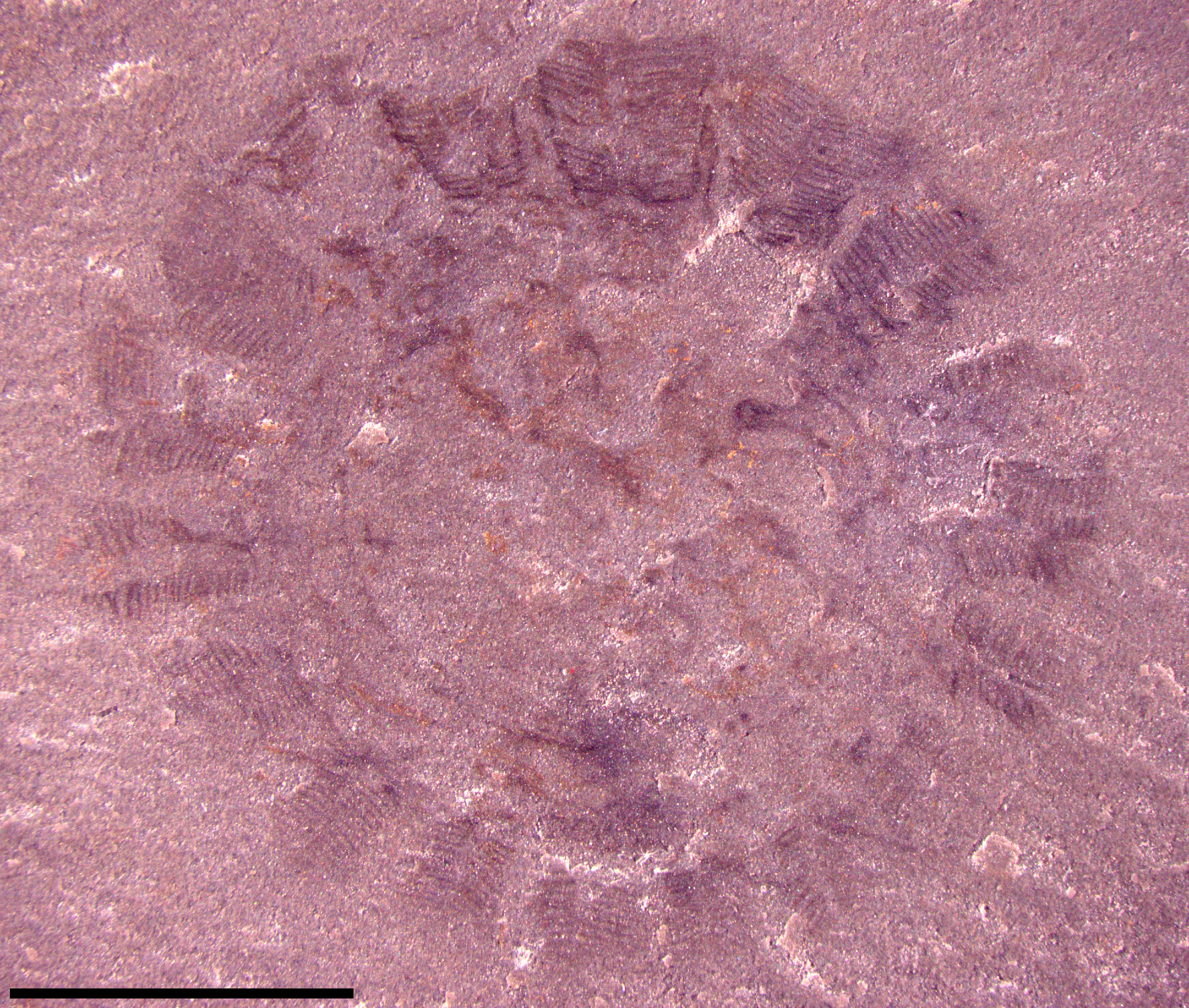
Photograph of a Middle Cambrian cnidarian jellyfish from Cartwright et al. (2007) published manuscript.

== Selected publications ==
- Cartwright, Paulyn; Bowsher, Julia; Buss, Leo W. (March 2, 1999). "Expression of a Hox gene, Cnox-2, and the division of labor in a colonial hydroid". Proceedings of the National Academy of Sciences. 96 (5): 2183–2186. Bibcode:1999PNAS...96.2183C. doi:10.1073/pnas.96.5.2183. PMC 26757. PMID 10051615.
- Cartwright, Paulyn; Halgedahl, Susan L.; Hendricks, Jonathan R.; Jarrard, Richard D.; Marques, Antonio C.; Collins, Allen G.; Lieberman, Bruce S. (October 31, 2007). "Exceptionally Preserved Jellyfishes from the Middle Cambrian". PLOS ONE. 2 (10) e1121. Bibcode:2007PLoSO...2.1121C. doi:10.1371/journal.pone.0001121. PMC 2040521. PMID 17971881.
- Daly, Marymegan; Brugler, Mercer R.; Cartwright, Paulyn; Collins, Allen G.; Dawson, Michael N.; Fautin, Daphne G.; France, Scott C.; Mcfadden, Catherine S.; Opresko, Dennis M.; Rodriguez, Estefania; Romano, Sandra L.; Stake, Joel L. (December 21, 2007). "The phylum Cnidaria: A review of phylogenetic patterns and diversity 300 years after Linnaeus". Zootaxa. 1668 (1). doi:10.11646/zootaxa.1668.1.11. hdl:1808/13641.
- Cartwright, Paulyn; Evans, Nathaniel M.; Dunn, Casey W.; Marques, Antonio C.; Miglietta, Maria Pia; Schuchert, Peter; Collins, Allen G. (December 2008). "Phylogenetics of Hydroidolina (Hydrozoa: Cnidaria)". Journal of the Marine Biological Association of the United Kingdom. 88 (8): 1663–1672. Bibcode:2008JMBUK..88.1663C. doi:10.1017/S0025315408002257. hdl:1808/15806.
- Cartwright, Paulyn; Nawrocki, Annalise M. (September 2010). "Character Evolution in Hydrozoa (phylum Cnidaria)". Integrative and Comparative Biology. 50 (3): 456–472. doi:10.1093/icb/icq089. PMID 21558215.

== Honors and awards ==
In 2025 Cartwright was named a Whitman Fellow by the Marine Biological Laboratory.
