= Fresno Yosemite International Airport =

Airport serving Fresno, California, US

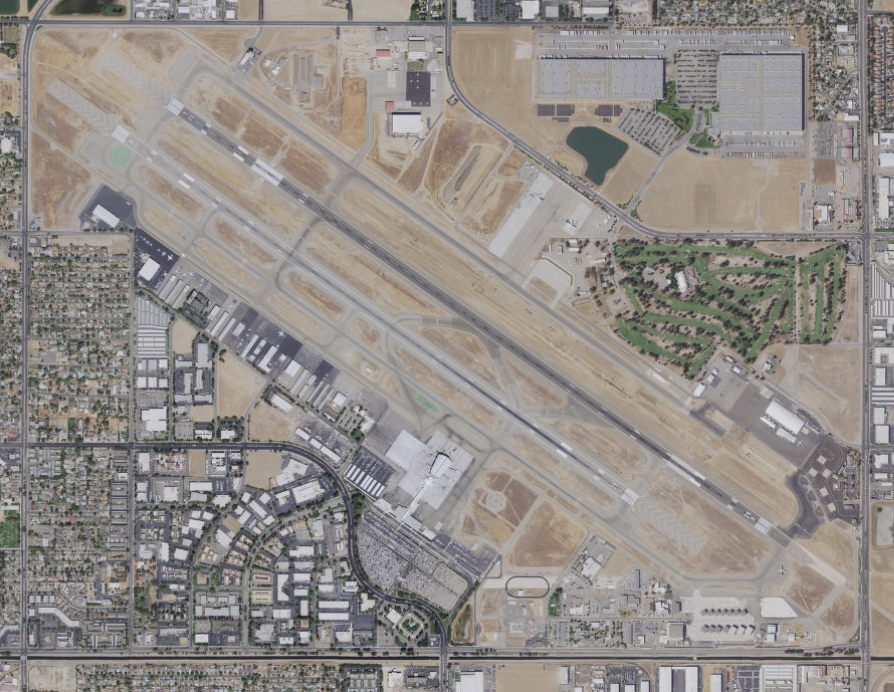
- USGS aerial image, 2020
- IATA: FAT; ICAO: KFAT; FAA LID: FAT

Summary
- Airport type: Public / Military
- Owner: City of Fresno
- Operator: City of Fresno Airports Division
- Serves: Fresno, San Joaquin Valley, Yosemite National Park, Sequoia National Park, Kings Canyon National Park
- Opened: June 1942; 84 years ago
- Time zone: PST (UTC−08:00)
  - Summer (DST): PDT (UTC−07:00)
- Elevation AMSL: 336 ft (102 m)
- Coordinates: 36°46′36″N 119°43′08″W
- Website: flyfresno.com

Maps
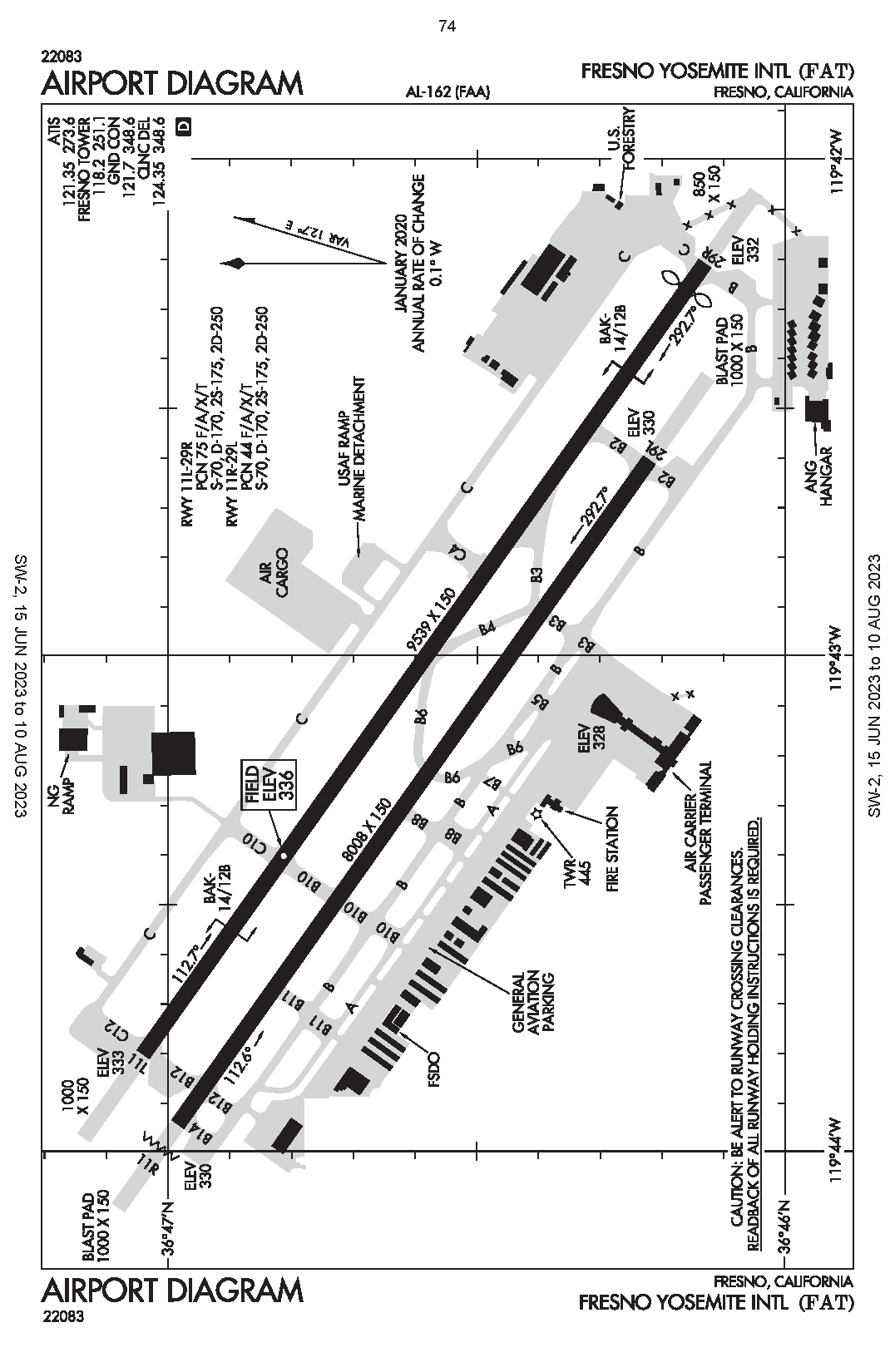
- FAA airport diagram
- Interactive map of Fresno Yosemite International Airport

Runways
Direction	Length		Surface
Direction	ft	m	Surface
11L/29R	9,539	2,907	Asphalt
11R/29L	8,008	2,441	Asphalt

Statistics (2025)
- Total Passengers: 2,752,392
- Aircraft movements (2024): 86,999

Fresno Yosemite International Airport (IATA: FAT, ICAO: KFAT, FAA LID: FAT) is a joint military–public airport in Fresno, California, United States. It is the primary commercial airport for the San Joaquin Valley and three national parks: Yosemite, Sequoia and Kings Canyon. It offers scheduled passenger flights to several major airline hubs in the United States and international service to Mexico. The facility opened in June 1942 as Hammer Field, a military airfield. The airport is owned and operated by the city of Fresno and operates two runways on a property spanning 1,728 acres (699 ha). Its airport code "FAT" stands for Fresno Air Terminal, a former name for the airport.

The airport has seen double-digit growth in its passenger traffic every year since 2018 (except 2020 due to the pandemic). As of 2024, the passenger terminal is undergoing a significant expansion project to expand the size of the security screening area, add new gates, and build a new international arrivals facility.

Due to its central location within the state, the airport is home to several military, law enforcement, firefighting, and medical air units. The Fresno Air National Guard Base on the southeast corner of the airport is home to the 144th Fighter Wing of the California Air National Guard. The Fresno Air Attack Base on the eastern side of the airport supports aerial firefighting aircraft. Other government and military operators with facilities at the airport include the California Army National Guard, the California Highway Patrol, the Fresno County Sheriff's Office, and the Fresno Police Department.

Fresno is home to a large operations base for SkyWest Airlines, the nation's largest regional airline.

== History ==
=== Military beginnings ===
The Fresno Yosemite International Airport opened as a military airfield in June 1942, just six months after Japan's attack on Pearl Harbor, leading the United States to enter World War II. The new airfield was named Hammer Field and was used by the United States Army Air Forces as a training facility for the new pilots of the Fourth Air Force. It had a single northwest/southeast oriented runway with a length of 7,200 feet (now runway 11L/29R).

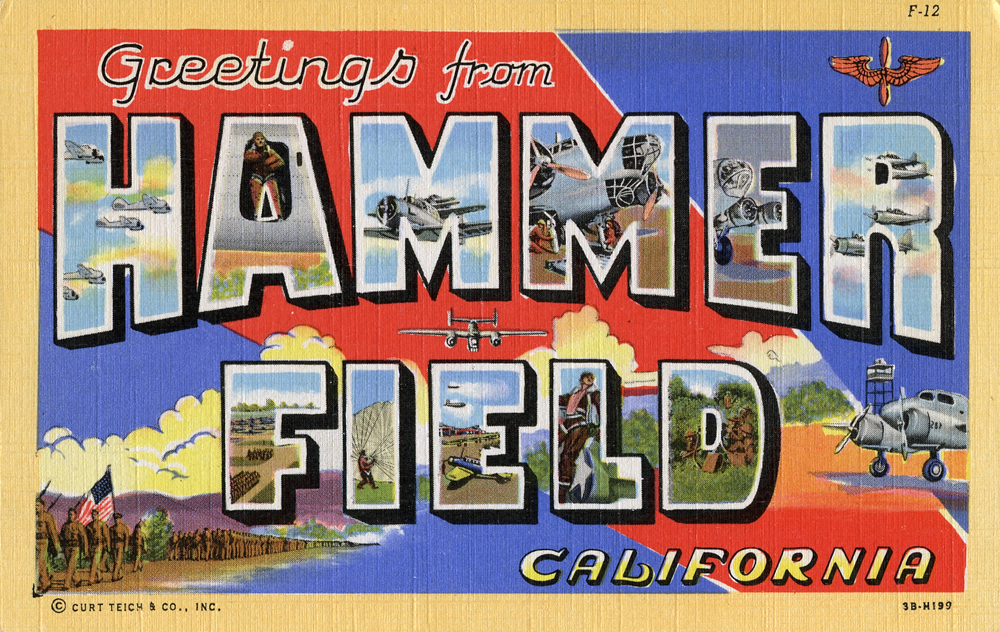
Curt Teich issued a "Greetings from Hammer Field" large letter postcard

Night fighter training, using Northrop P-61s, was moved to Hammer Field in January 1944, initially with the 481st Night Fighter Operational Training Group, replaced by the 319th Wing in May 1944. Training for the Bell P-59 Airacomet was added to the 319th mission in 1944, as well, confirmed Col. Ralph H. Snavely, commanding officer of the 319th Wing.

At the time, civil and commercial aviation used Chandler Field that had opened in November 1929. Chandler is 1.5 miles (2.4 km) west of downtown Fresno, on a small site. Less than a decade after it opened, it was clear that the small runway at Chandler would not be able to accommodate coming larger airliners.

=== Conversion to civil use ===
After World War II, Hammer Field was inactivated by the Army Air Forces, and the city of Fresno saw an opportunity to use the site to create a commercial airport much larger than Chandler Field. In 1946, the War Assets Administration reallocated the property to the city, and the construction of a passenger terminal on the northeast side of the airfield was immediately begun. In 1948, the newly renamed Fresno Air Terminal (FAT) opened. Trans World Airlines (TWA) and United Airlines flights to San Francisco/Oakland and Los Angeles moved from Chandler Field to the newly opened airport. Chandler Field was retained by the city of Fresno as a reliever airport and continues to operate as the Fresno Chandler Executive Airport.

Strategic Air Command facilities for Convair B-36 operations were initially proposed for “Hammer Air Force Base,” but objections from the City of Fresno led them to be changed to Travis Air Force Base instead. The Fresno upgrade was projected to cost $22.3 million.

The California Air National Guard moved to the airport in the 1950s and established the Fresno Air National Guard Base on the southeast corner of the property. The guard also built munition storage bunkers along the northern edge of the airport grounds. The 194th Fighter Squadron moved to the facility in late 1954, followed by the 144th Fighter Wing in 1957. As the guard moved in, a second parallel runway (11R/29L) was constructed and opened to traffic in 1956.

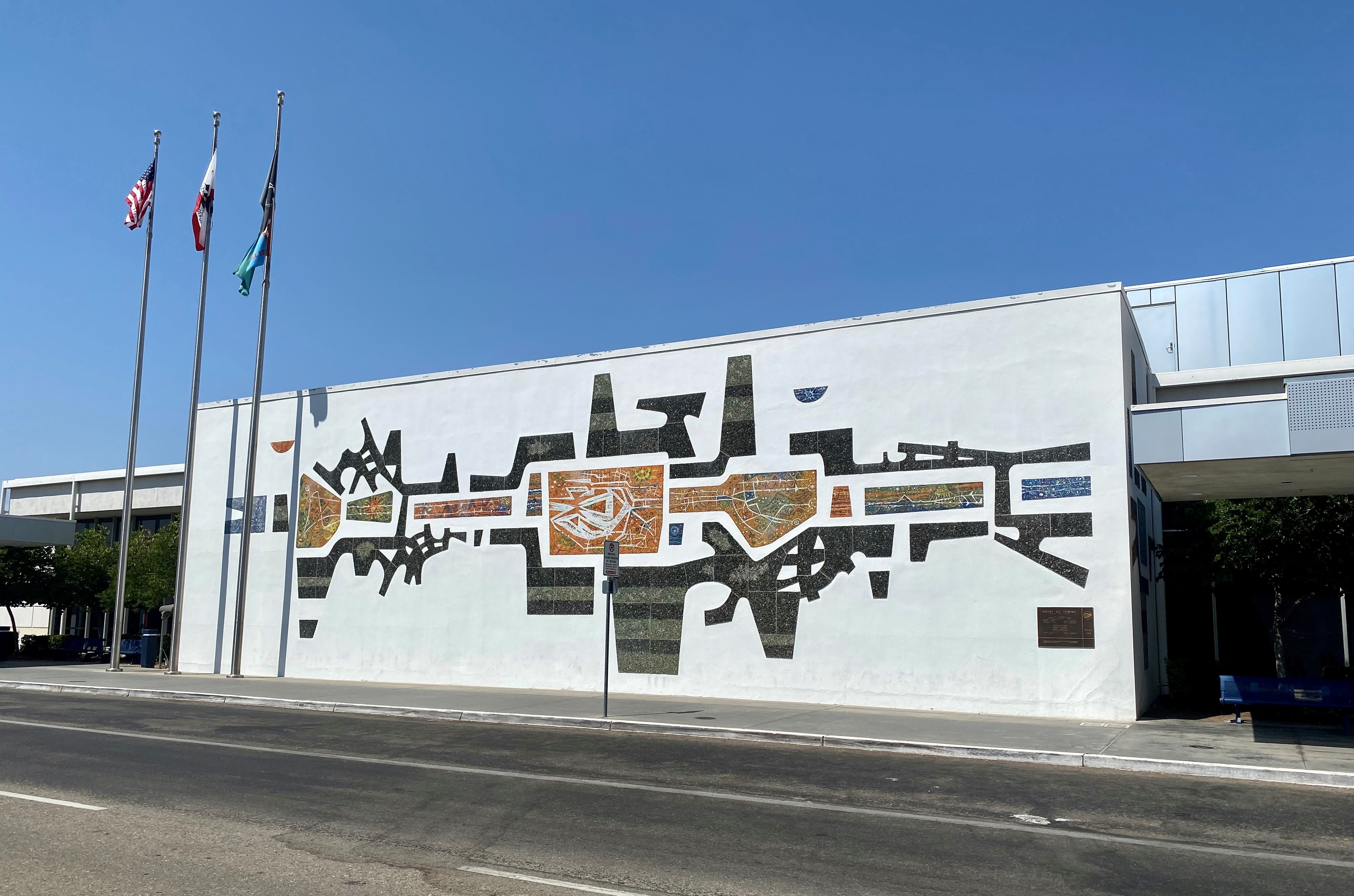
The original part of the terminal building, which opened in 1962 and includes the mosaic "Sky and Ground"

Construction started on a new, larger passenger terminal in 1959 on the south side of the field. The building was a long, simple shape that housed a baggage claim area, a central lobby, and a ticketing area. The $1.5 million terminal had long walls of glass for the baggage claim and the ticketing areas, which book-ended the central lobby of solid masonry block which bears a venetian glass mosaic called "Sky and Ground" from Raymond Rice. From the central lobby, passengers used a tunnel to reach the open-air, remote concourse where they boarded planes from ground level. The terminal opened on March 28, 1962 and shortly after received an award from the San Joaquin Valley Chapter of the American Institute of Architects. Although renovated, the original terminal building is still in use today for the same functions that it was designed for. The current air traffic control tower was built around the same time as the terminal and opened in 1961.

Pacific Air Lines was first to schedule jets to Fresno, with Boeing 727-100s in 1966. United was the dominant carrier at the airport throughout the mid-1970s. At the airlines' peak, United operated daily DC-8s jet service to Denver, San Francisco and Los Angeles. Hughes Airwest and PSA jets also served the airport at this time.

The first significant expansion to the passenger terminal came in 1978 when a concourse was built straight out from the central lobby. This building, unlike the original remote concourse, was enclosed and climate-controlled.

The airport saw significant down-gauging of flights following airline deregulation in 1978. By 1983, the airport mainly saw turboprop service from smaller carriers and United Airlines ended intrastate flights from Fresno. Delta Air Lines operated mainline jets to Los Angeles, Salt Lake City and Reno in the mid-1990s, but by 1999, the only mainline jet flights remaining at Fresno was the American Airlines service to Dallas/Fort Worth.

In 1996, the airport's name was changed from Fresno Air Terminal to Fresno Yosemite International Airport to attract out-of-state and international visitors to Yosemite National Park to the airport. Despite the new name, scheduled international commercial flights would not begin operating in Fresno for nearly a decade. At the time, airport managers petitioned the FAA for a new identifier code to replace FAT, which they said carries a negative connotation and no longer matched the initials of the airport. The request was denied, with the FAA reaffirming its long-standing policy to only issue a new identifier code when an airport is physically relocated. In recent years, airport managers have embraced the FAT identifier code, naming a major expansion project “FATforward.”

Fresno has been the headquarters for a few airlines throughout its history. In the mid-1980s, Far West Airlines was founded in Fresno and used the airport as a small intrastate hub serving Burbank, Los Angeles, Modesto, Oakland, Orange County, Sacramento, and San Jose. Air 21 was founded in Fresno in January 1994 and operated service between several western cities before ceasing operations in January 1997. Allegiant Air was founded in Fresno in January 1997 with a single DC-9, offering charter flights to Tahoe and other destinations. By 1999, it expanded to three planes serving Las Vegas, Burbank, and South Lake Tahoe. After declaring bankruptcy in 2000, its headquarters moved to a Las Vegas suburb under new leadership.

=== Expansion and remodeling ===
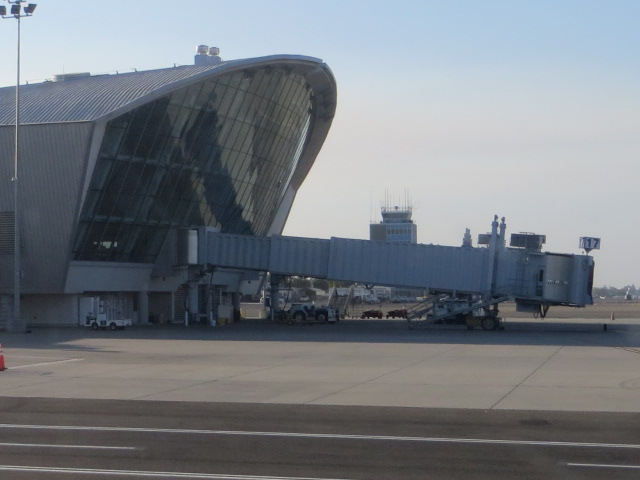
The new concourse with jet bridges

At the turn of the 21st century, the city began a series of projects to expand and remodel the passenger terminal. The first and most notable project was the expansion of the boarding areas. The project, designed by DMJM Aviation, extended the concourse further, creating a new two-level section with six jet bridges. Before this project, passengers boarded all planes using stairs or ramps. When completed in 2002, the new concourse building received praise for its design and was named one of the top 10 projects in Fresno Architecture for the decade, with critics commending the use of steel and the curved glass facade.

A U.S. Customs and Border Protection facility for international arrivals was added in early 2006, giving federal officials space to check passports and complete customs work. Completion of that facility allowed Fresno to begin receiving scheduled international commercial flights. The first international service started in April 2006 with Mexicana operating flights between Fresno and Mexico City with an intermediate stop in Guadalajara.

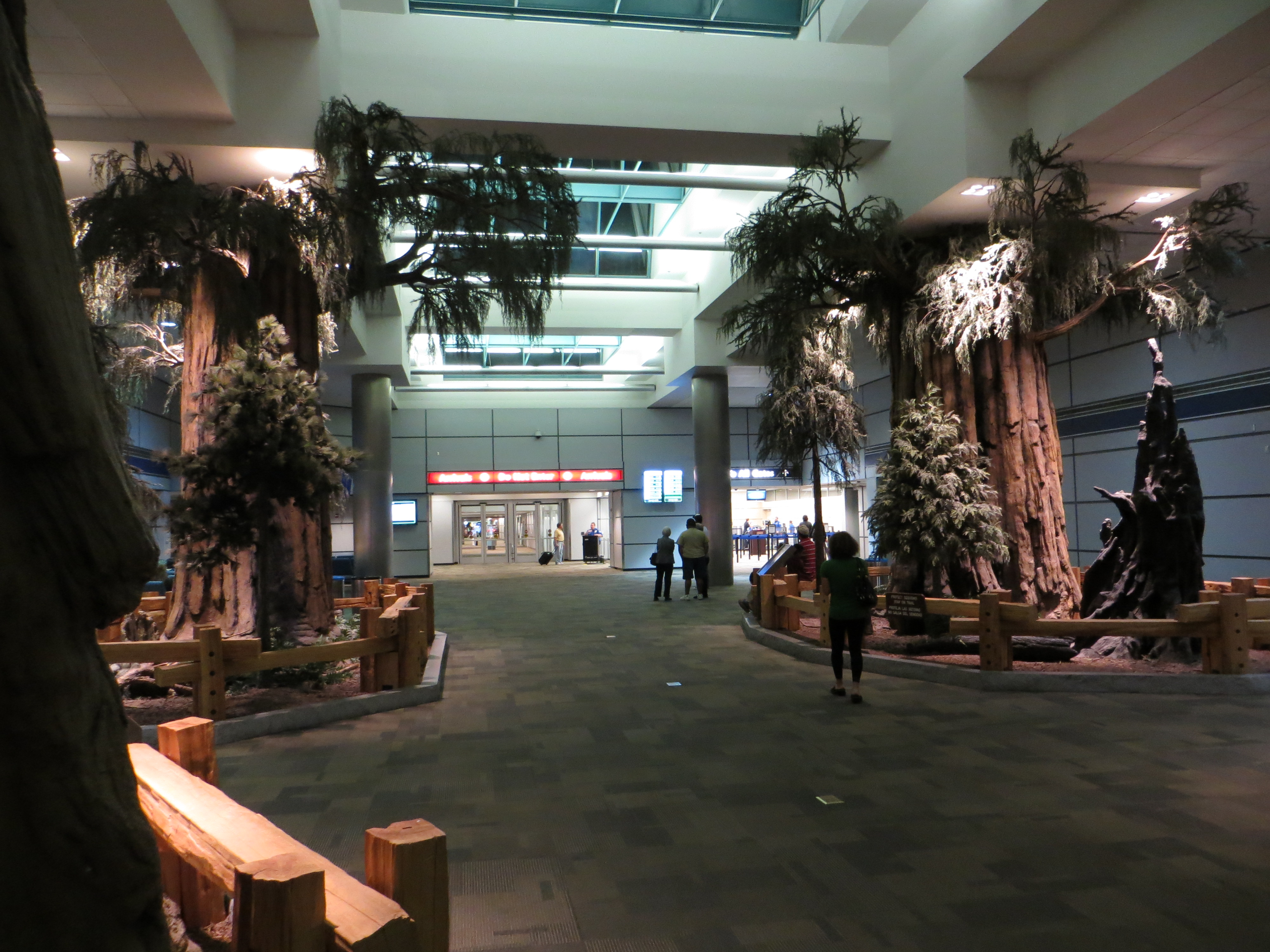
"Sequoiascape," a public art display inside the terminal that depicts a sequoia forest

With the new concourse extension and new international arrivals facility completed, portions of the original 1960s terminal building were given a major renovation. The project was designed by CSHQA and completed in several phases between 2006 and 2010. While keeping the facility operational, nearly every part of the building was updated, including the baggage claim area, security checkpoint, central lobby, ticketing area, and low-level concourse. The centerpiece of the project was “Sequoiascape,” a public art display in the central terminal lobby that depicts a life-size replica sequoia forest, reflecting the airport's role as a gateway to the nearby national parks. The giant trees appear to be supporting the roof of the terminal. They are surrounded by fallen logs, foliage, and the split rail fencing and granite curbs that visitors would see at the region’s national parks.

A consolidated rental car facility opened at the airport in 2009. The $22 million project allows customers of most rental car companies to pick up and drop off vehicles just outside the terminal. The project also included the construction of maintenance buildings and storage lots on a nearby 11-acre site.

Direct international service from Fresno briefly ended in August 2010 when Mexicana went bankrupt. International service resumed, with more flights, less than a year later when both Aeroméxico and Volaris added service between Fresno and Guadalajara in April 2011.

The secondary runway (11R/29L) was widened, lengthened and strengthened in a $30 million project completed in October 2012.

Southwest Airlines began serving the airport on April 25, 2021, the first time the airline provided services at Fresno's airport, with daily flights to Las Vegas and Denver.

The airport added a 917-space, four-level parking garage in November 2021. The project cost $32 million.

== Future expansion ==
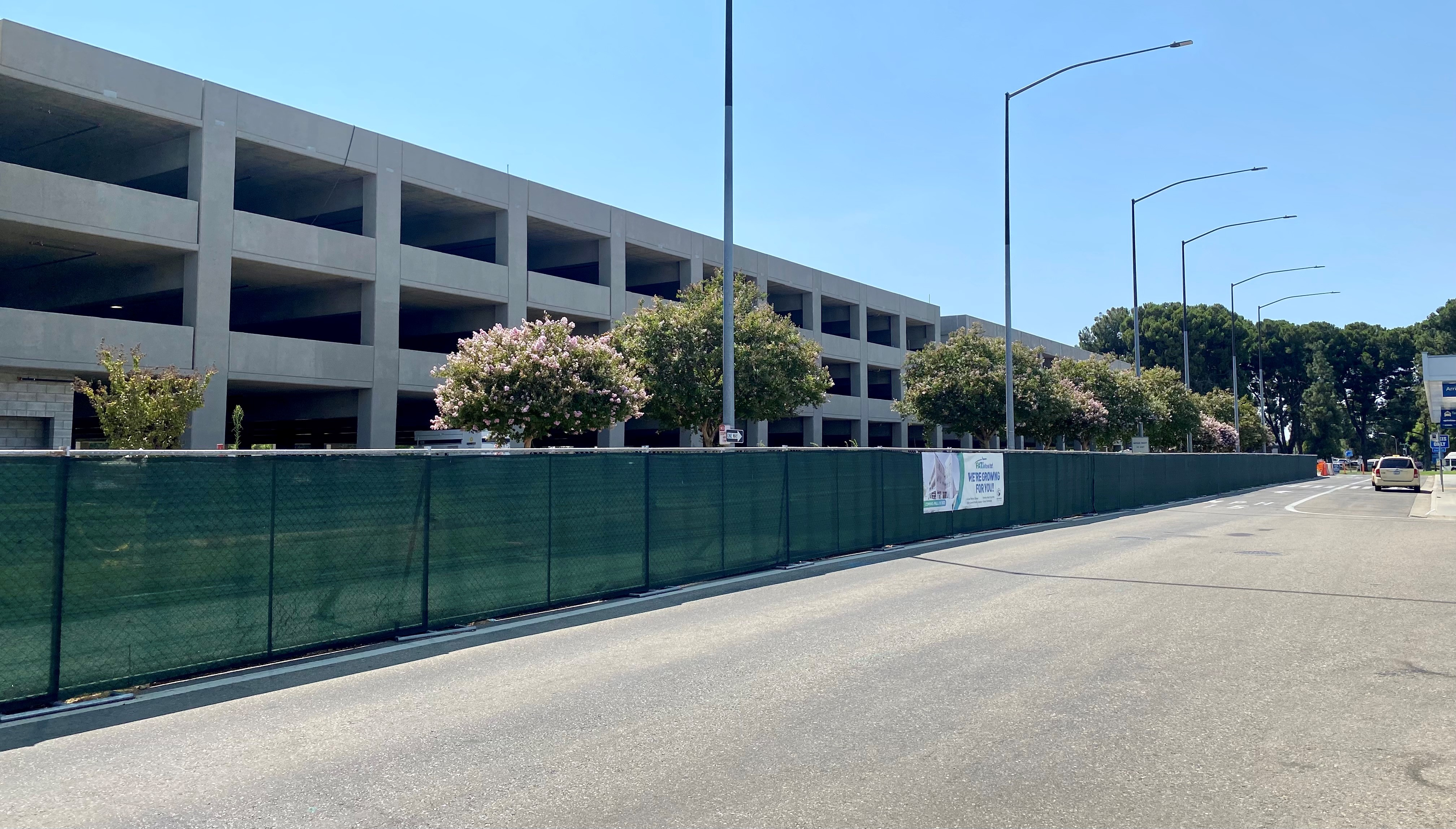
Parking garage under construction, July 2021

Fresno Yosemite International Airport is currently working on a $127 million expansion project that will make several changes to the terminal, including the addition of a new concourse building with two new gates that can be used for both domestic and international flights, enlarging the screening area for arriving international passengers, expanding the luggage-handling and sorting area for outbound flights, new shopping/dining areas, and expanding the Transportation Security Administration security checkpoint.

Airport managers initially anticipated that construction on the terminal expansion would begin in early 2021 and be operational before the Summer 2022 travel season. However, due to the COVID-19 pandemic, the process was delayed, and construction did not start until Spring 2023 therefore phase one was completed in Fall 2025. The air traffic control tower is also expected to be replaced by 2024 in a $30 million project.

The airport's primary runway (11L/29R) is scheduled to be reconstructed between 2025 and 2027, a $45 million project.

== Airline service ==
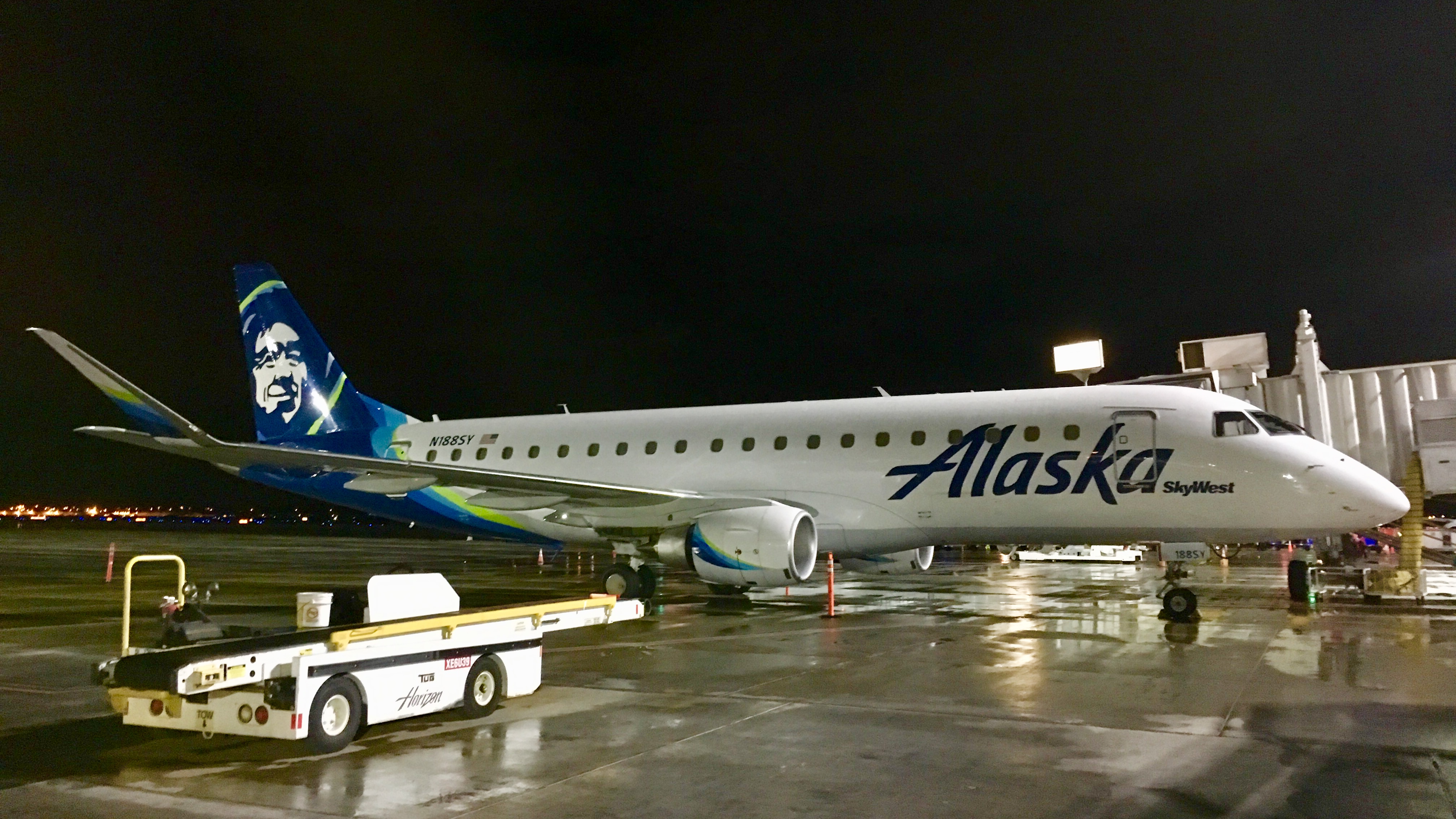
Alaska Airlines Embraer 175 operated by SkyWest Airlines parked at the gate at Fresno Yosemite International Airport. SkyWest is a major operator from Fresno with a maintenance facility and aircrew base located at the airport.

SkyWest carries about 34% of the passenger traffic at Fresno, more than any other carrier. The regional airline operates under contract with mainline partners as American Eagle, Alaska Airlines, Delta Connection and United Express. SkyWest has a 17-acre (6.9 ha) maintenance and overnight parking facility on the east side of the airfield with 21 aircraft positions and an approximately 92,000-square-foot (8,500 m^{2}) hangar. SkyWest also uses Fresno as a crew base for pilots and flight attendants.

Airlines that operate narrow-body aircraft from either the Airbus A320 family or the Boeing 737 family of jets include Alaska Airlines, Allegiant Air, American Airlines, Delta Air Lines, Southwest Airlines, and United Airlines.

Aeroméxico and Volaris both operate international service between Fresno and Guadalajara, Mexico's second-largest city and a major airline hub in the country. Additionally, Volaris also operates service to Morelia, the capital of and largest city in Mexico's Michoacán state and León, the largest city in Mexico's Guanajuato state. Direct international service from Fresno began on April 1, 2006, and are now some of the busiest flights from the airport. As of 2016, international service on Aeroméxico and Volaris accounted for about 6% of all flights to Fresno but carried more than 13% of all passengers flying to the airport, a combined total of almost 201,000 people.

United Airlines is the carrier with the longest continuous operation out of Fresno Yosemite International Airport, which began serving the airport on its opening day alongside Trans World Airlines (TWA) which would later merge into American Airlines.

== Infrastructure ==
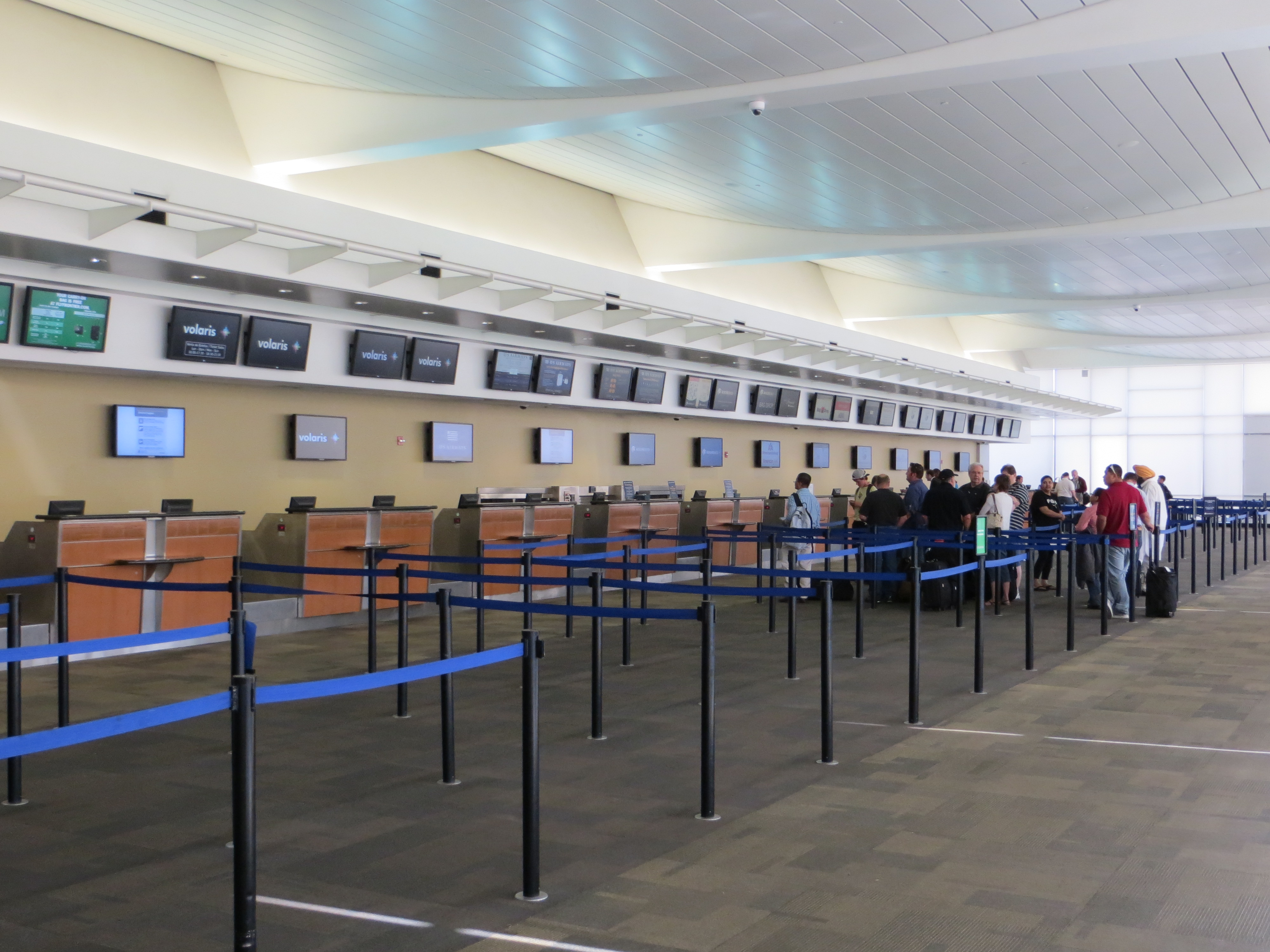
Check-in counters

Fresno Yosemite International Airport covers 1,728 acres (699 ha) at an elevation of 336 ft (102 m) above mean sea level, with two paved asphalt runways. The primary runway, 11L/29R, is 9,539 by 150 ft (2,907 by 46 m) and the secondary runway, 11R/29L, 8,008 by 150 ft (2,441 by 46 m).

In 2022, 2.1 million passengers passed through the Fresno Yosemite International Airport, representing an 11% increase from the previous record set in 2021, when 1.94 million passengers flew in and out of the airport, and breaking the record for most passengers, previously set in 2019.

== Airlines and destinations ==
=== Passenger ===
As of August 2025, Fresno Yosemite International Airport has non-stop passenger flights scheduled to 13 domestic and 3 international destinations in Mexico, operated by 8 airlines.

Airlines	Destinations	Refs.
Aeroméxico	Seasonal: Guadalajara	
Alaska Airlines	Portland (OR), San Diego, Seattle/Tacoma	
Allegiant Air	Las Vegas; Seasonal: Portland (OR)	
American Airlines	Dallas/Fort Worth, Phoenix–Sky Harbor	
American Eagle	Phoenix–Sky Harbor	
Delta Connection	Salt Lake City	
Southwest Airlines	Denver, Las Vegas, San Diego; Seasonal: Dallas–Love	
United Airlines	Denver; Seasonal: Chicago–O'Hare	
United Express	Denver, Los Angeles, San Francisco	
Volaris	Guadalajara, León/El Bajío, Morelia	

=== Cargo ===
Airlines	Destinations	Refs.
Ameriflight	Burbank, Ontario, Santa Maria	
FedEx Express	Denver, Grand Junction, Memphis, Oakland, Tulsa, Visalia	
UPS Airlines	Louisville, Ontario	

== Statistics ==
=== Top destinations ===
Busiest domestic routes from FAT (January 2025 – December 2025)
Rank	City	Passengers	Carriers
1	Las Vegas, Nevada	211,770	Allegiant, Southwest
2	Dallas/Fort Worth, Texas	210,610	American
3	Denver, Colorado	133,030	Southwest, United
4	Phoenix, Arizona	123,810	American
5	San Diego, California	90,840	Alaska, Southwest
6	Seattle–Tacoma, Washington	87,280	Alaska
7	Salt Lake City, Utah	75,220	Delta
8	San Francisco, California	64,870	United
9	Los Angeles, California	56,420	United
10	Portland, Oregon	50,990	Alaska, Allegiant

=== Airline market share ===
Market share at FAT (January 2025–December 2025)
Rank	Airline	Passengers	Share
1	SkyWest Airlines	898,000	38.68%
2	American Airlines	584,000	25.16%
3	Southwest Airlines	405,000	17.44%
4	Allegiant Air	148,000	6.35%
5	United Airlines	123,000	5.28%
—	All others	164,000	7.08%

=== Passenger traffic ===
Year	Passengers	Change	Passenger totals (in millions)
2002	908,314	-	
2003	915,911	+0.8%	
2004	1,031,291	+12.6%	
2005	1,092,130	+5.9%	
2006	1,189,967	+9.0%	
2007	1,248,255	+4.9%	
2008	1,273,813	+2.0%	
2009	1,128,695	−11.4%	
2010	1,146,685	+1.6%	
2011	1,159,989	+1.2%	
2012	1,240,286	+6.9%	
2013	1,328,972	+7.2%	
2014	1,390,704	+4.6%	
2015	1,392,070	+0.1%	
2016	1,540,922	+10.7%	
2017	1,538,833	−0.1%	
2018	1,765,963	+14.8%	
2019	1,964,489	+11.2%	
2020	990,627	−49.6%	
2021	1,948,313	+96.7%	
2022	2,181,841	+12.0%	
2023	2,449,418	+12.3%	
2024	2,672,881	+9.1%	
2025	2,752,392	+3.0%	

== Military and government operations ==
The 144th Fighter Wing of the California Air National Guard is based at the Fresno Yosemite International Airport. The California Army National Guard also has an Aviation Classification Repair Activity Depot (AVCRAD) at the airport. The depot performs high-level maintenance and repair of Army aircraft. Its jurisdiction covers a 15-state region in the Western United States.

The United States Forest Service, Sierra National Forest and the California Department of Forestry and Fire Protection (CAL FIRE) jointly operate the Fresno Air Attack Base at the airport for fighting forest fires with aerial tankers. The air attack base has a command center and four loading pits where fire retardant is pumped into aircraft with the capacity to load up to 300,000 gallons each day.

Other government operators with facilities at the airport include the California Highway Patrol (CHP), the Fresno County Sheriff's Office, and the Fresno Police Department.

== Ground transportation and access ==
The airport is located about one mile (1.6 km) north of California State Route 180, with vehicles using Peach Avenue to connect between the airport and the highway. California State Route 180 connects to all of the other freeways in the Fresno area: California State Route 41, California State Route 99, and California State Route 168. Yosemite National Park can be accessed by California State Route 41 and Kings Canyon National Park and Sequoia National Park can be accessed by California State Route 180.

The city of Fresno offers paid on-site parking in a 900-space parking garage south of the airport terminal, a large lot south of the terminal, and several smaller lots east of the terminal. A separate cell phone waiting lot located on the southeast corner of the airport property has stalls designated for drivers waiting for arriving passengers.

Fresno Area Express (FAX) operates two public transit bus routes to the airport, each with half-hourly service. Route 26 Palm / Butler runs between the airport and North Fresno via Southeast and Downtown Fresno (where passengers may transfer to other FAX routes). Route 39 FYI/Clinton runs between the airport and West Fresno.

The City of Visalia operates the V-LINE bus between the airport and the Visalia Transit Center (where passengers can connect to Visalia Transit routes) and the Visalia Airport (which offers V-LINE passengers free long-term parking for up to ten days).

The airport offers a consolidated rental car facility at the terminal's west end. Nine rental car companies have passenger service counters inside the terminal near the baggage claim area, and up to 400 cars can be parked in a lot just west of the terminal building. The 11-acre rental car facility opened in 2009 and was built at a cost of $22 million.

The airport has covered bicycle parking racks inside the parking garage south of the terminal. Nearby roads East Clinton Way and East McKinley Avenue have Class II bike lanes (on-roadway, separated) and they connect to the Class I bike path (off-roadway) that runs alongside North Clovis Avenue. As of 2025, the City of Fresno is constructing a Class I bike path along McKinley that will provide a better connection to the Clovis Avenue path and also travel as far east as Blackstone Avenue.

== Accidents and incidents ==
- On December 14, 1994, a private jet on a military training mission, attempting to land at Fresno, crashed onto a street and skidded into an apartment complex, killing both pilots and injuring 21 people on the ground. The Learjet 35, piloted by two civilians and belonging to a Georgia-based company, Phoenix Air Group, was contracted by the US Air Force to provide training for California Air National Guard pilots. The plane had been involved in a war game with an F-16 fighter jet and was on its way back to the airport when the flight crew declared an emergency due to engine fire indications. They directed the plane toward their requested runway but the aircraft continued past the airport. On radio transmissions, the flight crew was heard attempting to diagnose the emergency conditions and control the aircraft, until the plane crashed with its landing gear down about 2 miles (3.2 km) southwest of the airport. It then plowed into an apartment complex and exploded in a fireball. Twelve apartment units in two buildings were destroyed or substantially damaged by the impact or the subsequent fire. The National Transportation Safety Board determined that the probable causes of the accident were improperly installed electrical wiring that led to an in-flight fire which damaged the aircraft's systems causing a loss of control and improper maintenance and inspection of the aircraft.
- On September 13, 2015, a McDonnell Douglas MD-87 jetliner converted for aerial firefighting use as an air tanker operated by Erickson had an engine failure after taking off from the airport. Pieces of the engine struck a car, damaging it. The aircraft was able to return to the airport safely.
- On December 18, 2019, a 17 year old girl was arrested after attempting to steal a Beechcraft King Air 200 . She was able to start one engine before eventually crashing into a Landmark Aviation building.
