= Fresno Chandler Executive Airport =

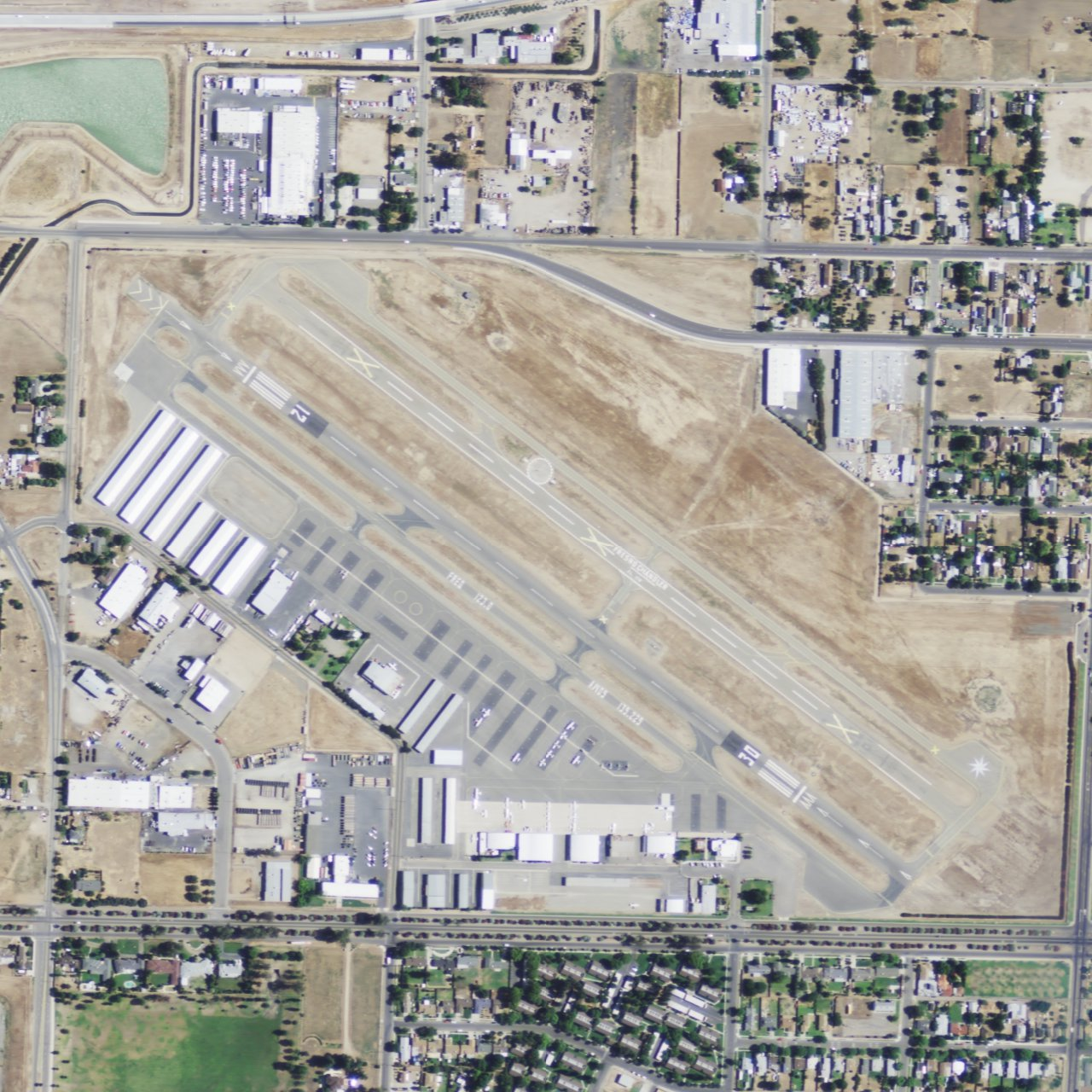
- Fresno Chandler Executive Airport, 2006 aerial photo
- IATA: FCH; ICAO: KFCH; FAA LID: FCH

Summary
- Airport type: Public
- Owner: City of Fresno
- Operator: City of Fresno Airports Division
- Serves: Fresno, California
- Opened: November 1929
- Passenger services ceased: 1948
- Elevation AMSL: 279 ft (85 m)
- Coordinates: 36°43′56″N 119°49′13″W
- Website: flyfresno.com/chandler-executive

Maps
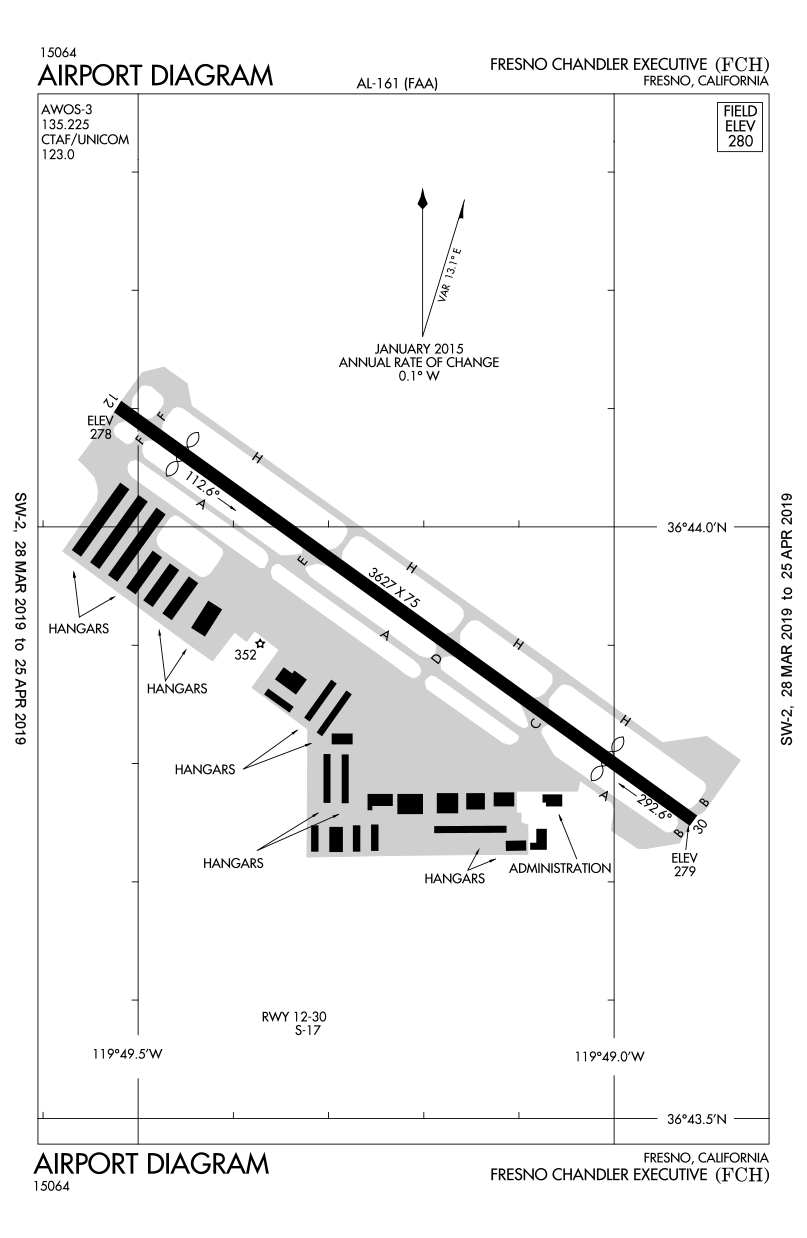
- FAA airport diagram

- Location of Fresno Chandler Executive Airport

Runways
Direction	Length		Surface
Direction	ft	m	Surface
12/30	3,627	1,106	Asphalt

Statistics (2010)
- Aircraft operations: 24,885
- Based aircraft: 124
- Source: Federal Aviation Administration

Fresno Chandler Executive Airport (IATA: FCH, ICAO: KFCH, FAA LID: FCH) is a public use airport 1.5 miles (2.4 km; 1.3 nmi) west of the central business district of Fresno, California, United States. It is owned by the city of Fresno and managed by the city’s Airports Division.

Chandler Airport opened in November 1929 and served as Fresno’s primary airport for civil and commercial aviation until 1948.

Today, Chandler is mostly used by general aviation aircraft and is a designated as a reliever airport for the larger Fresno Yosemite International Airport, located 6.5 miles (10.5 km; 5.6 nmi) northeast which is served by commercial airlines.

Sierra Sky Park Airport, a privately owned airport open to the public, that also serves general aviation aircraft, is located 8 miles (13 km; 7.0 nmi) north.

== History ==
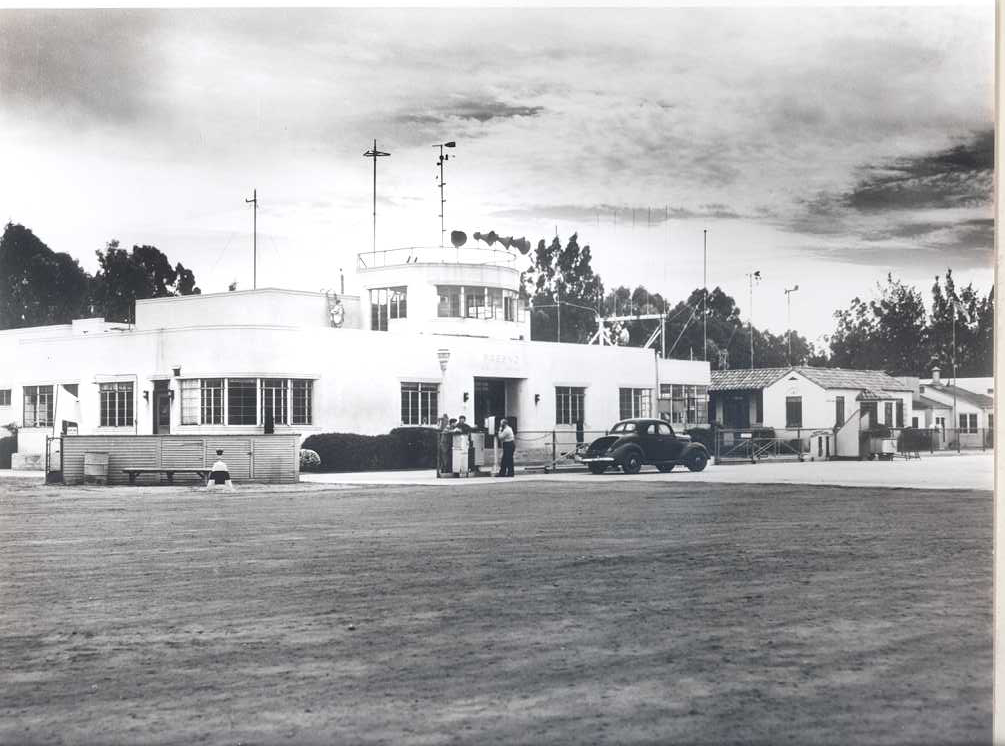
Airport terminal building, c. 1936

Fresno Chandler Executive Airport is one of the oldest operational airports in California. Its history stretches back to the end of World War I. At the time, there were no aviation facilities in the Fresno area. Recognizing the problem, husband and wife Wilber F. Chandler and Edna Maria Goble allowed pilots to take off and land in their fields once the crops were harvested. Pilots called the site "Chandler Field."

Efforts to raise funds for a permanent aviation field in Fresno started in the early 1920s. One notable fundraiser was the "World's Greatest Aerial Circus" held at the Chandler farm on the afternoon of Thanksgiving Day 1923, featuring races, parachute jumps and dual wing walking.

In 1929, the Chandler family donated 100 acres of land to the city as a public-use airfield. The site was named after the family and opened as Chandler Air Field in November 1929. The airport was used by both civil and commercial aviation.

On March 23, 1930, Charles Lindbergh and his wife landed briefly at the airport and were greeted by a crowd of 20,000.

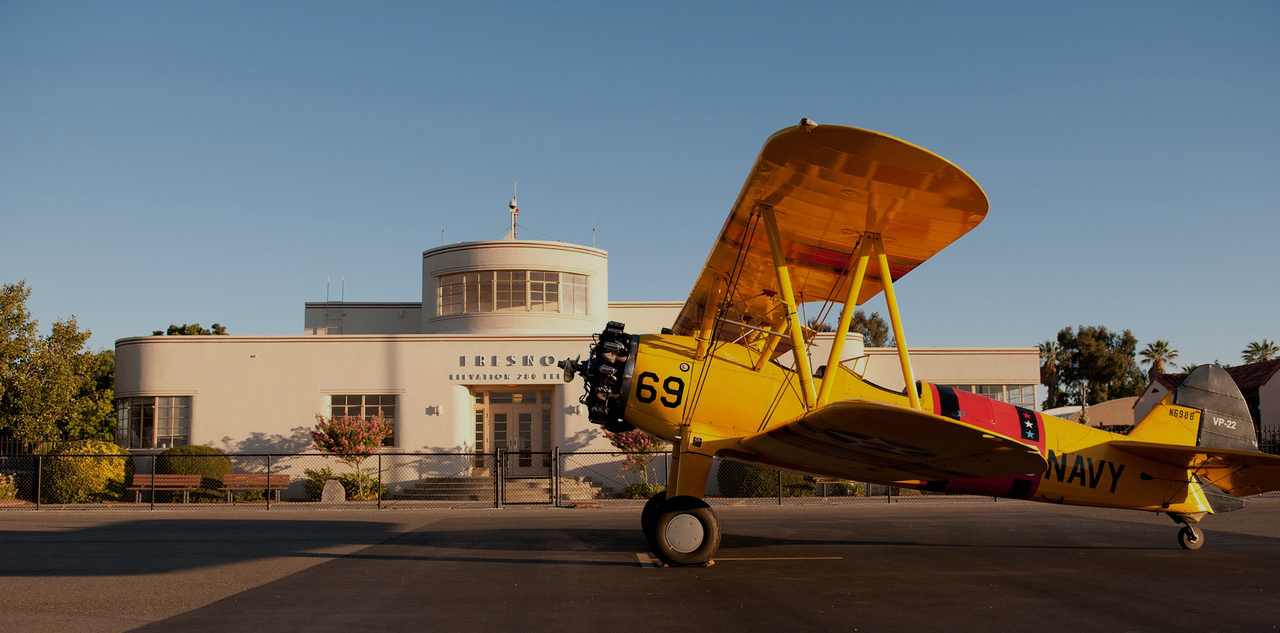
Historic terminal and administration building at the Fresno Chandler Executive Airport

The Works Progress Administration (WPA) funded the construction of the airport terminal and administration building along with other support buildings in 1936. As of 2022, the building still stands and remains in active use. It is considered to be one of the most intact WPA funded airports in the United States. The WPA also extended Chandler's runway to 4,000 feet in 1938. However, despite the investments, it was already clear that the small facility would not be able to accommodate the increasingly larger airplanes used by the commercial airlines.

In early 1941, shortly before the United States officially entered World War II, the Southwest Air District of the United States Army Air Corps took over the airport while nearby Hammer Field was being built. Hammer Field opened in June 1942 and all military activity moved there.

After the end of the war, Hammer Field was inactivated by the Army Air Forces, and in 1946 the War Assets Administration reallocated the property to the city of Fresno. The now civilian airport re-opened in 1948 as the Fresno Air Terminal (FAT), since renamed the Fresno Yosemite International Airport. Trans World Airlines (TWA) and United Airlines flights to San Francisco/Oakland and Los Angeles moved from Chandler Field to the newly opened airport.

After the move, Chandler Airport was designated as a reliever airport for Fresno Yosemite International Airport and has been marketed as an executive airport located closer to Downtown Fresno.

== Facilities and aircraft ==
Fresno Chandler Executive Airport covers 200 acres (81 ha) at an elevation of 279 feet (85 m) above mean sea level. It has one asphalt paved runway designated 12/30 that is 3,630 by 75 feet (1,106 by 23 m).

For the 12-month period ending May 9, 2017 the airport had 24,885 general aviation aircraft operations, an average of 68 per day. At that time there were 124 aircraft based at this airport: 83% single-engine, 7% ultralight, 6% multi-engine, 4% helicopter, and 1% jet.

== See also ==
- California World War II Army Airfields
