= Sierra Cartwright =

British novelist (born 1963)

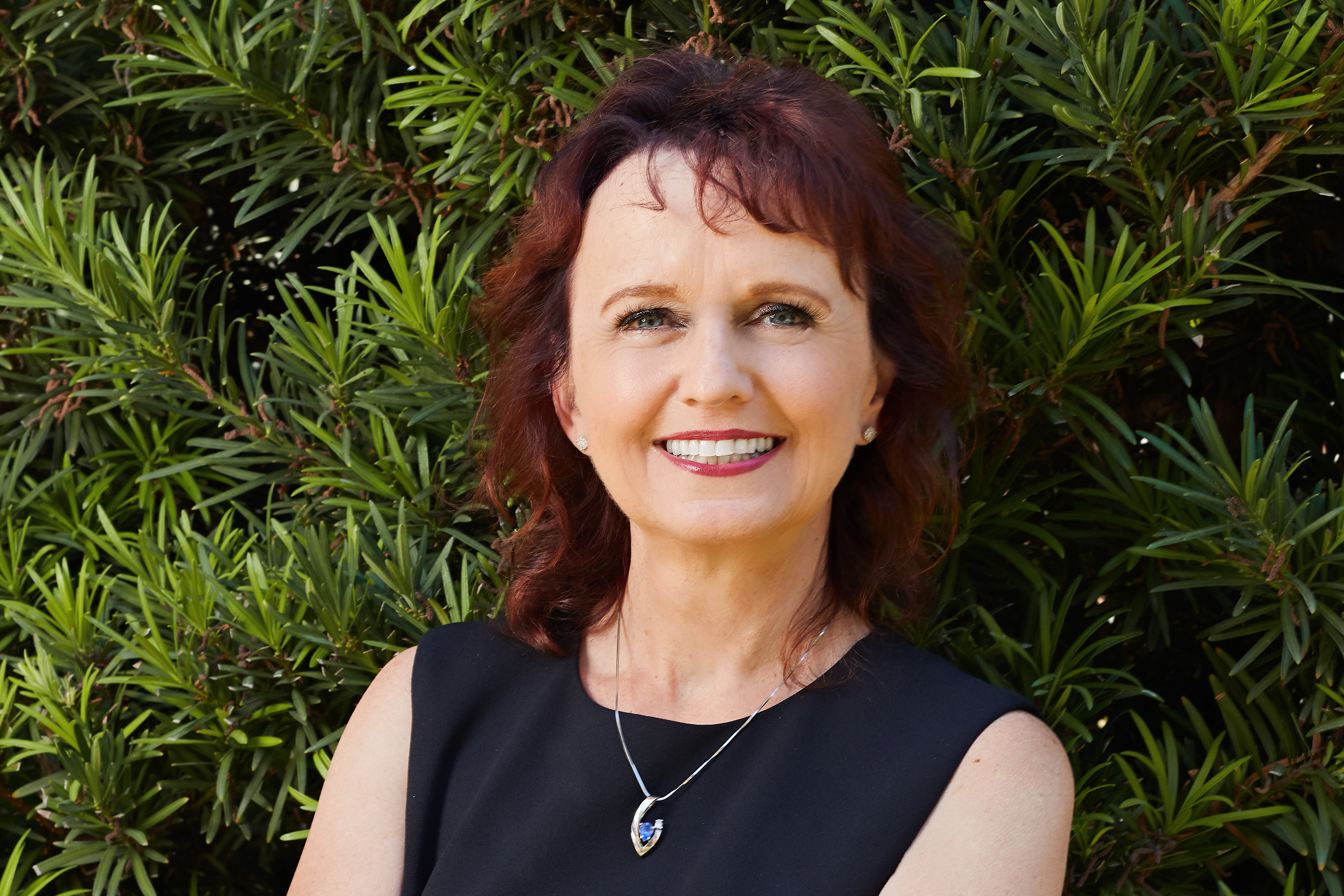
- Born: 12 October 1963 (age 62); Manchester, England
- Occupation: Novelist
- Writing career
- Genre: Romance
- Website: sierracartwright.com

Sierra Cartwright (born 12 October 1963) is an International and two-time USA Today Best-Selling contemporary romance writer who has published more than 30 books, including the mass market paperback Donovan Dynasty Series: Bind, Brand, and Boss.

== Career ==
"Sierra wrote her first book at age nine, a fanfic episode of Star Trek when she was fifteen, and she completed her first romance novel at nineteen.

Sierra took part in a series done by Total-E-Bound Publishing called the Clandestine Classics. The controversial re-vemp of these classics caught the attention of Anderson Cooper 360° and was mentioned on a segment in July 2012.

Her second novel in the Mastered series, "On His Terms" was listed by Look Magazine as one of "Fifty Shades of Grey: 5 Books That Put It To Shame."

The sixth novel in the Mastered series "In The Den" has an article on USA Today.

Sierra was also the keynote speaker at BDSM Writers Con 2016 in NYC. She also co-hosted multiple writing seminars and panels at the Romantic Times books lovers convention.

== Notable works ==
In 2016 Sierra was in two box sets that made the USA Today Best-Seller book list. Bound, Spanked and Loved: 14 Kinky Valentine's Day Stories hit #126 on the list.

The second book "Hero To Obey" featuring John Joseph Quinlan hit No. 108 on the USA Today best-sellers list.

Sierra is widely known for her Mastered Series (Totally Bound Publishing) where her book, "With This Collar" became an International Best-Seller and spent over a week at No. 1 on Amazon's (erotic) best-selling list. The third book in the Mastered Series, "Over The Line" won "BDSM book of the year 2013" through BDSM Book Reviews.

Her Bonds series debuted in May 2014 starting with the book "Crave" which won a Golden Flogger Award in BDSM Light. Book 3, "Command" is a Golden Flogger nominee in BDSM Advanced Category.

== Bibliography ==
=== By Series ===
Bonds Series

- Crave (2014)
- Claim (2014)
- Command (2015)

Hawkeye Series

- Danger Zone (2008)
- Bend Me Over (2009)
- Make Me (2010)
- Met Her Match (2015)
- A Good Sub Would (2015)
- Come to Me (2018)
- Trust in Me (2018)
- Meant for Me (2018)
- Hold On To Me (2021)
- Believe in Me (2021)
  - Collections:
- Here for Me (2020)
- Beg for Me (2021)
- Undercover Seduction: Hawkeye Firsts (2023)

Hawkeye Denver

- Initiation (2021)
- Temptation (2022)
- Determination (2023)
  - Collections:
- Run, Beautiful, Run (2023)

Titans

- Sexiest Billionaire (2018)
- Billionaire’s Matchmaker (2018)
- Billionaire’s Christmas (2018)
- Determined Billionaire (2019)
- Scandalous Billionaire (2020)
- Ruthless Billionaire (2022)
- Billionaire’s Revenge (2024)
  - Collections:
- Titans Billionaires Firsts (2021)
- Titans Billionaires: Volume 1 (2020)
- Titans Billionaires: Volume 2 (2022)

Titans: Captivated

- Theirs to Hold (2021)
- Theirs to Love (2022)
- Theirs to Wed (2022)
- Theirs to Treasure (2023)
  - Collections:
- Yours To Love (2023)

Titans: The Quarter

- His to Claim (2019)
- His to Love (2019)
- His to Cherish (2021)
  - Collections:
- Billionaires’ Quarter (2022)

Titans Quarter Holidays

- His Christmas Gift (2022)
- His Christmas Wish (2022)
- His Christmas Wife (2023)

Titans: Sin City

- Hard Hand (2018)
- Slow Burn (2021)
- All-In (2021)
  - Collections:
- Risking it All (2022)

Titans: The Reserve

- Tease Me (2022)

Donovan Dynasty

- Bind (2015)
- Brand (2015)
- Boss (2016)

Mastered Series

- With This Collar (2013)
- On His Terms (2013)
- Over The Line (2013)
- In His Cuffs (2013)
- For The Sub (2013)
- In The Den (2014)

Mastered Ten-Year Anniversary Editions with Bonus Content

- With This Collar (2023)
- On His Terms (2023)
- Over The Line (2023)
- In His Cuffs (2023)
- For The Sub (2023)
- In The Den (2024)
  - New Release:
- With This Ring (2024)

=== Novels ===
- Bound and Determined (2011)
- Night of the Senses: Voyeur (2009)
- Signed, Sealed, and Delivered (2008)
- In The Zone (2012)
- I Heart That city: Double Trouble (2009)
- Unbound Commitment (2009)
- Jane Eyre (2012)

=== Novellas ===
- Master Class: Initiation (2016)
- One Night in Vegas: Master Class: Hard Hand (2016)
- Walk on the Wild Side (2007)
- Her Two Doms (2013)
- Bound to the Billionaire: Bared to Him (2013)
- Naughty Nibbles: This Time (2008)
- Naughty Nibbles: Fed Up (2008)
- Bound Brits: S&M 101 (2009)
- Subspace: Three-way Tie (2012)
- Night of the Senses: Voyeur (2009)
- Homecoming: Unbound Surrender (2010)

=== Box Sets and Anthologies ===
- Doms of Dark Haven
- Doms of Dark Haven 2: Western Nights
- Bound, Spanked and Loved
- One Night in Vegas
- Hero to Obey
