= Buena Vista =

Buena Vista, meaning "good view" in Spanish, may refer to:

== Places ==
=== Canada ===
- Bonavista, Newfoundland and Labrador, with the name being originally derived from “Buena Vista”
- Buena Vista, Saskatchewan
- Buena Vista, Saskatoon, a neighborhood in the city of Saskatoon
- Buena Vista Road, Edmonton

=== United States ===
- Buena Vista, Alabama
- Buena Vista, California (disambiguation)
  - Buena Vista, Amador County, California
  - Buena Vista, former name of Buttonwillow, California, in Kern County
  - Buena Vista, Mariposa County, California, a place in California
  - Buena Vista, San Jose, Santa Clara County
  - Buena Vista, Sonoma County, California, a place in California
  - Buena Vista, Tehama County, California, a place in California
  - Buena Vista, former name of Visalia, California, in Tulare County
- Buena Vista, Colorado
- Buena Vista (St. Georges, Delaware), listed on the NRHP in Delaware
- Buena Vista (Miami), a neighborhood in Miami, Florida
- Buena Vista, Georgia
- Buena Vista, Illinois
- Buena Vista Township, Schuyler County, Illinois
- Buena Vista, Franklin County, Indiana
- Buena Vista, Gibson County, Indiana
- Buena Vista, Harrison County, Indiana
- Buena Vista, Randolph County, Indiana
- Buena Vista County, Iowa
- North Buena Vista, Iowa
- Buena Vista, Kentucky
- Buena Vista (Stonewall, Louisiana), listed on the NRHP in Louisiana
- Buena Vista (Leonardtown, Maryland), listed on the NRHP in Maryland
- Buena Vista, Michigan
- Buena Vista, Kent County, Michigan
- Buena Vista Charter Township, Michigan
- Buena Vista, Mississippi
- Buena Vista, Ohio (disambiguation), several places in this state with this name
  - Buena Vista, Fayette County, Ohio
  - Buena Vista, Hocking County, Ohio
  - Buena Vista, Scioto County, Ohio
- Buena Vista, Oregon
- Buena Vista, Pennsylvania
- Buena Vista, Tennessee
- Buena Vista, Texas
- Buena Vista, Virginia
- Buena Vista (Roanoke, Virginia), listed on the NRHP in Virginia
- Buena Vista (Washington, D.C.), a neighborhood of Washington, D.C.
- Buena Vista, Wisconsin (disambiguation)
  - Buena Vista, Grant County, Wisconsin
  - Buena Vista, Portage County, Wisconsin
  - Buena Vista, Richland County, Wisconsin
  - Buena Vista, Waukesha County, Wisconsin
- Buena Vista Historic District (Kentucky), Newport, Kentucky, listed on the NRHP in Campbell County, Kentucky
- Buena Vista Historic District (Tennessee), Nashville, Tennessee, listed on the NRHP in Davidson County, Tennessee
- Buena Vista Lake, now drained, in Kern County, California
- Buena Vista Lake Bed, a watershed within the Great Basin in Buena Vista Valley
- Buena Vista Oil Field, in Kern County, California
- Buena Vista Park, a park in the Haight-Ashbury and Buena Vista Heights neighborhoods of San Francisco, California
- Buena Vista Township (disambiguation)
- Buena Vista Valley, Pershing County, Nevada
- Buena Vista Wildlife Area, Wisconsin
- Lake Buena Vista, Florida
- Montgomery-Janes-Whittaker House, commonly known as Buena Vista, listed on the NRHP in Autauga County, Alabama

==== Puerto Rico ====
- Buena Vista, Bayamón, Puerto Rico, a barrio
- Buena Vista, Hatillo, Puerto Rico, a barrio
- Buena Vista, Humacao, Puerto Rico, a barrio
- Buena Vista, Las Marías, Puerto Rico, a barrio
- Buena Vista, Carolina, Puerto Rico, a barrio

=== Other places ===
- Buena Vista, Catamarca, Argentina
- Buena Vista, Corozal, Corozal District, Belize
- Buena Vista, Ichilo, Bolivia
- Bay of Buena Vista, Cuba
- Buena Vista, Dominican Republic, in Jarabacoa, La Vega Province
- Buena Vista Barracks and Battery, Gibraltar
- Buena Vista, Coahuila, Mexico; site of the 1847 Battle of Buena Vista
- Buena Vista Beach, in Los Cabos Municipality, Baja California Sur
- Buena Vista, Colón, Colón Province, Panama
- Buena Vista, Paraguay
- Buena Vista, Peru, an archaeological site
- Buena Vista or Vatilau, an island in the Nggela Islands, Central Province, Solomon Islands

== Other uses ==
- Buena Vista (brand), an American brand name of The Walt Disney Company
- Buena Vista Home Entertainment, an American home video distribution unit of Buena Vista
- Buena Vista Pictures Distribution, an American former name of Walt Disney Studios Motion Pictures until 2007
- Buena Vista International, an international distributor of Walt Disney Studios Motion Pictures
- Battle of Buena Vista, a battle in the Mexican–American War fought in 1847 in Buena Vista, Coahuila, Mexico
- "Buena Vista" (song), a song by Gomez from their 2000 compilation album Abandoned Shopping Trolley Hotline
- Buena Vista (horse) (born 2006), a Japanese Thoroughbred racehorse
- Buena Vista Cafe, a café in San Francisco, California, credited with introducing Irish coffee to the United States
- Buena Vista Street, a part of Disney's California Adventure
- Buena Vista Street (Burbank, California), a location of The Walt Disney Company and namesake of other Disney-related properties
- Buena Vista Winery, a winery in Sonoma, California, United States
- Buena Vista University, Storm Lake, Iowa

== See also ==
- Buena Vista Social Club (disambiguation)
- Buena Vista Park (disambiguation)
- Buenavista (disambiguation)
- Bonavista (disambiguation)
- Boa Vista (disambiguation)
- Buona Vista (disambiguation)
