= Boa Vista =

Boa Vista or Boavista (Portuguese meaning "good view") may refer to:

== Places ==
Brazil

- Boa Vista, Paraíba
- Boa Vista, Porto Alegre, neighborhood in Porto Alegre, Rio Grande do Sul
- Boa Vista, Roraima
  - Boa Vista International Airport
  - Boa Vista Air Force Base
- Boa Vista da Aparecida, Paraná
- Boa Vista das Missões, Rio Grande do Sul
- Boa Vista do Buricá, Rio Grande do Sul
- Boa Vista do Cadeado, Rio Grande do Sul
- Boa Vista do Gurupi, Maranhão
- Boa Vista do Incra, Rio Grande do Sul
- Boa Vista do Ramos, Amazonas
- Boa Vista do Sul, Rio Grande do Sul
- Boa Vista do Tupim, Bahia

Cape Verde

- Boa Vista, Cape Verde, one of the Barlavento Islands of Cape Verde
  - Boa Vista, Cape Verde (municipality), a municipality encompassing the whole island

== Sports ==
- Boavista (cycling team), a Portuguese cycling team based in Porto
- Boavista (futsal), an amateur futsal team based in Porto, Portugal
- Boavista F.C., a prominent Portuguese football club in the city of Porto
- Boavista FC (Cape Verde), a Capeverdean football club
- Boavista Sport Club, a Brazilian football club
- Circuito da Boavista, a Formula 1 racetrack in the city of Porto

== Other uses ==
- Boa Vista (literary magazine), founded in Hamburg, Germany in 1974 and published until 1983
- Boa Vista, Angola, a railway station; see Railway stations in Angola
- Boa Vista FM, an FM radio station broadcasting variety and pop at 96.3 FM in Paracatu, Minas Gerais, Brazil
- Natalia Boa Vista, a character on the television show CSI: Miami
- MV Boa Vista, a ferry in service 2001-07

== See also ==
- Bonavista (disambiguation)
- Buena Vista (disambiguation)
- Buenavista (disambiguation)
- Buona Vista (disambiguation)
