= Polyaesthetics =

Art education concept

Polyaesthetics or polyaesthetic education (from ancient Greek πολυ (poly) for much and αἴσθησις (aísthēsis) for perception) is an art education concept that emerged in Hamburg in the course of the 68er-Bewegung in the 20th century.

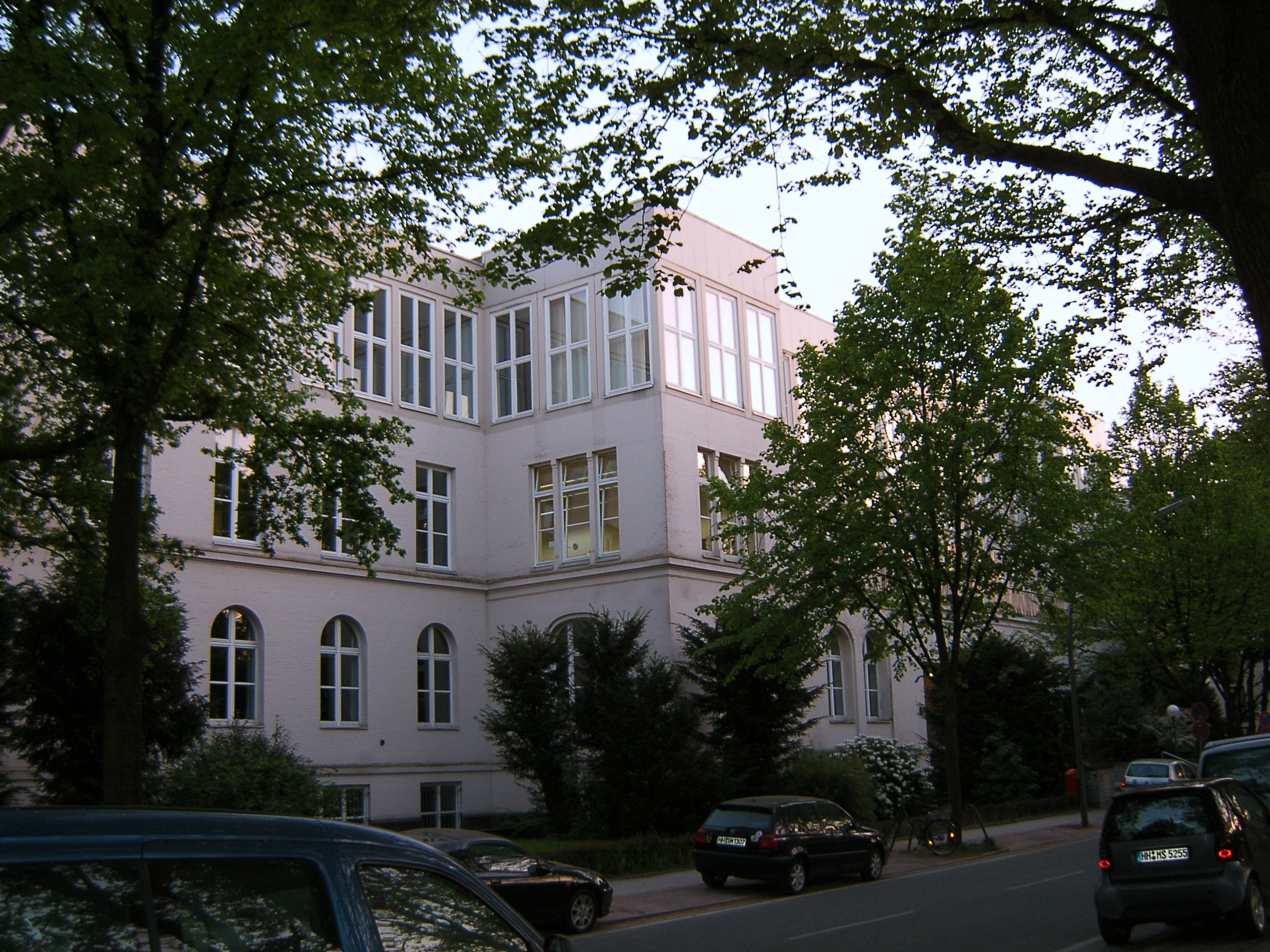
Fachhochschule für Gestaltung, Hamburg, 1970

== Concept ==
In terms of the history of ideas, the term polyaesthetics comes from Natias Neutert, whom the dean Hans Weckerle appointed as a lecturer at the Fachhochschule für Gestaltung in Hamburg in 1970. His inaugural lecture there was a plea for the establishment of a new art education subject that would transcend the boundaries of previous conceptions of aesthetics. While Neutert's art education 'building blocks' are outlined as a "free play of ideas" in essayistic form, the art educator Wolfgang Roscher and his colleagues have the merit of having developed them into a pragmatic concept of an aesthetic multimedia education.

== Agency ==
The six fields of practice and learning inspired by Herbert Marcuse's neo-Marxist ideas of production, reproduction, demonstration, reflection, consumption and reception, which Roscher and colleagues base polyaesthetic practice on, have proven to be particularly useful in the field of so-called 'music education'.

Neutert's approach of crossing the boundaries of traditional aesthetics, inspired by his research activities in the first International Walter Benjamin Society, which he founded, is based on the concept of an improvised and open game that is not strictly rule-governed, but should exercise and sharpen our sense of possibility in relation to crude reality; according to his often quoted formula: Spielen erzeugt eine eigene Wirklichkeit: die der Möglichkeiten (Playing creates its own reality: that of possibilities) This formula, which is mainly quoted in the cultural sector and used as a motto for projects, was sensibly linked closely to Heinz von Foerster's Ethical Imperative by Karlshochschule International University on the occasion of its cultural theory discourse Learning through Play. The interplay of Heinz von Foerster's ethical imperative and Natias Neutert's formula emphasizes the importance of playful openness to novel ideas, perspectives and solutions in order to expand the diversity of choice and action possibilities in the sense of a fully developed human condition.

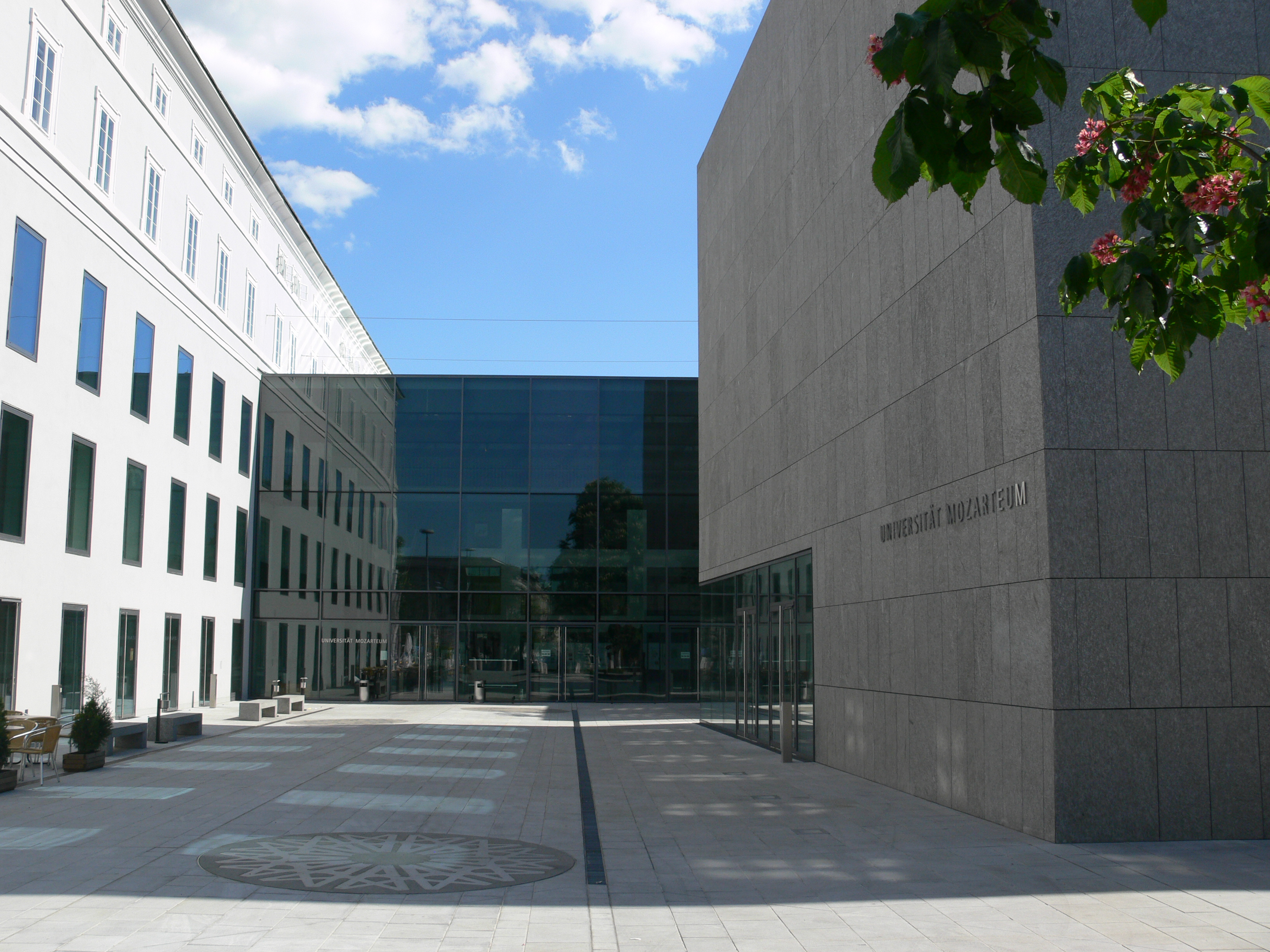
Salzburg Mozarteum 2008

The recent most important European center for polyesthetic education is the Mozarteum University Salzburg as evidenced not least by the intercultural congresses regularly held there. They act as a stimulus for other institutions.As a school branch, Polyaesthetics focuses on the four areas of expression and design: drama, dance, visual education and music. Polyaesthetical education has proven to be beneficial for the inclusion of disabled people, for example blind people

== Literature ==
- Natias Neutert: Bausteine für eine polyästhetische Erziehung. Ed. by Hans Weckerle, Fachhochschule für Gestaltung, Verlag Einsteins Erben, Hamburg 1971.
- Wolfgang Roscher et al.: Polyästhetische Erziehung. Klänge, Texte, Bilder, Szenen. Theorien und Modelle zur pädagogischen Praxis. Köln, 1976. ISBN 3-7701-0844-2
- Erika Funk-Hennigs: Musische Bildung – Polyästhetische Erziehung. Eine historisch vergleichende Studie über zwei musikdidaktische Ansätze des 20. Jahrhunderts, in: Musikpädagogische Forschung Band 1 Einzeluntersuchungen. Ed. by Arbeitskreis Musikpädagogische Forschung e. V. durch Klaus-E. Behne, Laaber Verlag, Lilienthal bei Bremen, 1980.
- Sabrina Tiedtke: Polyästhetische Erziehung mit Jugendlichen als Grundlage zur Auseinandersetzung mit der Welt. Diplomarbeit, 2002.
- Michaela Schwarzbauer/Gerhard Hofbauer (Ed.): Polyästhetik im 21. Jahrhundert. Chancen und Grenzen ästhetischer Erziehung. Tagungsband des 24. Polyaisthesis-Symposions auf Schloss Goldegg 2008. Reihe Polyästhetik und Bildung. Lang, Frankfurt u. a. 2007, ISBN 978-3-631-56806-4.

== See also ==
- Gesamtkunstwerk
