= Concurrency (road) =

Road bearing more than one route number

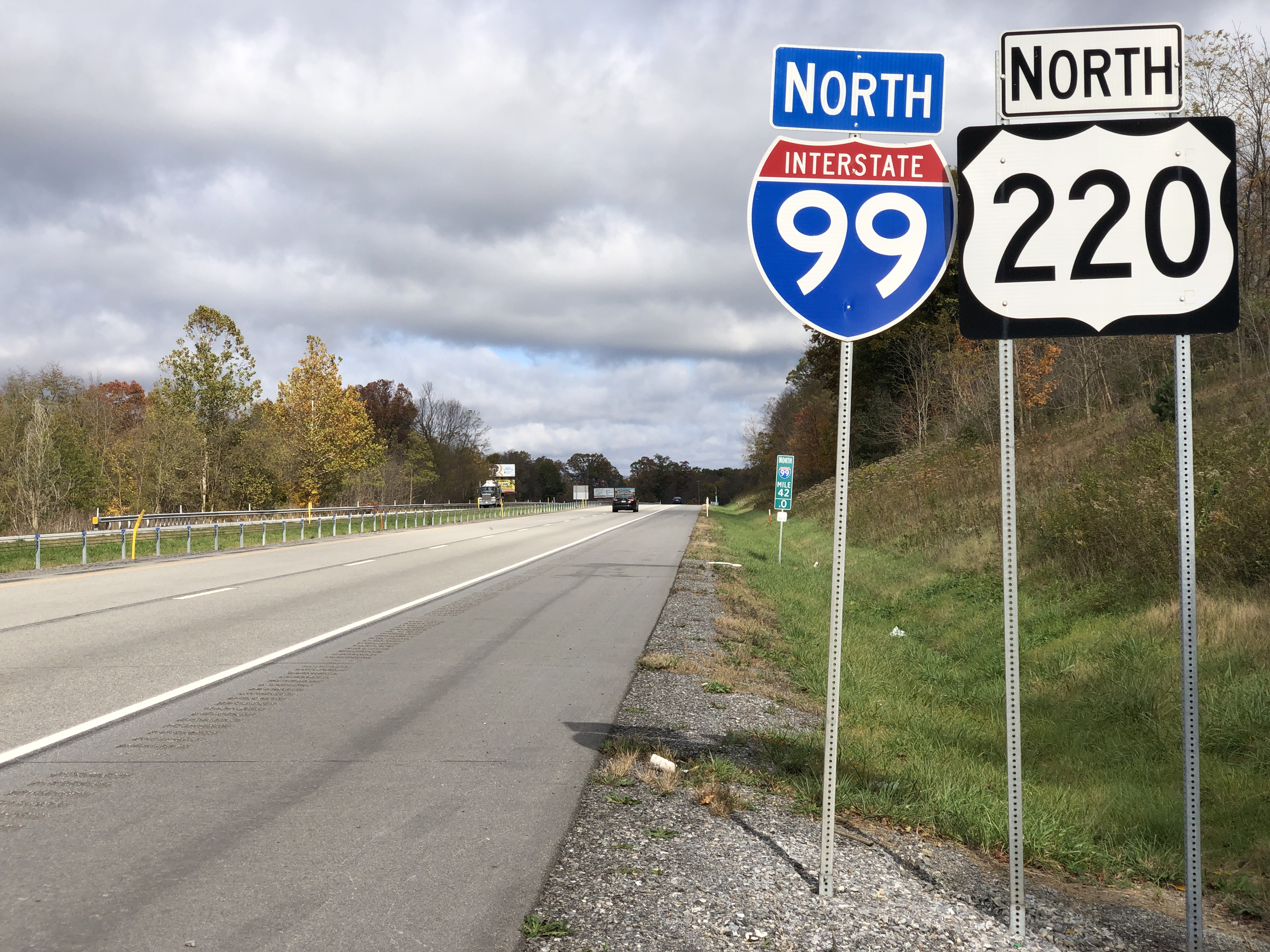
Highway shields on a two-way concurrency, where I-99 and US 220 share one roadway traveling northbound in Antis Township, Blair County, Pennsylvania

In a road network, a concurrency is an instance of one physical roadway bearing two or more different route numbers. The practice is often economically and practically advantageous when multiple routes must pass between a single mountain crossing or over a bridge, or through a major city, and can be accommodated by a single right-of-way. Each route number is typically posted on highways signs where concurrencies are allowed, while some jurisdictions simplify signage by posting one priority route number on highway signs. In the latter circumstance, other route numbers disappear when the concurrency begins and reappear when it ends. In most cases, each route in a concurrency is recognized by maps and atlases.

== Terminology ==
When two roadways share the same right-of-way, it is sometimes called a common section or commons. Other terminology for a concurrency includes overlap, coincidence, duplex (two concurrent routes), triplex (three concurrent routes), multiplex (any number of concurrent routes), dual routing or triple routing.

== Concept ==
Most concurrencies are simply a combination of at least two route numbers on the same physical roadway. This is often practically advantageous as well as economically advantageous; it may be better for two route numbers to be combined into one along rivers or through mountain valleys. While some countries allow for concurrencies to occur, others specifically prohibit them. In those nations which do permit concurrencies, it can become very common. In these countries, there are a variety of concurrences which can occur.

An example of this is the concurrency of Interstate 70 (I-70) and I-76 on the Pennsylvania Turnpike between New Stanton and Breezewood, Pennsylvania. I-70 merges with the Pennsylvania Turnpike so the route number can ultimately continue east into Maryland; instead of having a second physical highway built to carry the route, it is combined with the Pennsylvania Turnpike and the I-76 designation. The longest Interstate Highway concurrency is I-80 and I-90, which run concurrent on the Indiana Toll Road and Ohio Turnpike for 278 miles (447 km) between Lake Station, Indiana and Elyria Township, Ohio.

There are at least two examples of eight-way concurrencies. The first example is in Indianapolis, between exits 46 and 47 of the 53-mile (85 km) I-465 beltway, where the highway is concurrent with I-69, U.S. Highway 31 (US 31), US 36, US 40, US 52, US 421, and State Road 67. The second example is in downtown Athens, Georgia, between exits 4 and 8 of SR 10 Loop, where the highway is concurrent with US 29, US 78, US 129, US 441, SR 8, SR 15, and the unsigned SR 422.

=== Wrong-way concurrency ===
An example of a wrong-way concurrency in Oklahoma City, Oklahoma; the wrong-way concurrency is highlighted in red.

Since highways in the United States and Canada are usually signed with assigned cardinal directions based on their primary orientation, it is possible for a stretch of roadway shared between two highways to be signed with conflicting, even opposite, cardinal directions in a wrong-way concurrency. For example, near Wytheville, Virginia, there is a concurrency between Interstate 77 (which runs primarily north–south, as it is signed) and Interstate 81 (which runs primarily northeast–southwest, but is also signed north–south). A vehicle might simultaneously be on I-77 northbound and I-81 southbound, while actually traveling due west. An unusual example of a three-directional concurrency occurs southeast of Rhinelander, Wisconsin, where US 8 westbound (the actual compass direction) converges with southbound Wisconsin Highway 17 and northbound Wisconsin Highway 47, and vice-versa.

There is an example of a highway that has a wrong-way concurrency with itself; in Newport News, Virginia, the eastbound and westbound lanes of US 60 are briefly concurrent on a short stretch of Huntington Avenue.

=== Effect on exit numbers ===
Often when two routes with exit numbers overlap, one of the routes has its exit numbers dominate over the other and can sometimes result in having two exits of the same number, albeit far from each other along the same highway. An example of this is from the concurrency of I-94 and US 127 near Jackson, Michigan. The concurrent section of freeway has an exit with M-106, which is numbered exit 139 using I-94's mileage-based numbers. US 127 also has another exit 139 with the southern end of the US 127 business loop in Mount Pleasant, Michigan. (US 127's mile markers in Michigan reflect the cumulative distance north of the Ohio state line; the numbers resume north of the I-94 overlap and reflect the distance accumulated on that concurrency.)

However, there are also instances where the dominant exit number range is far more than the secondary route's highest exit number, for example the concurrency of I-75 and I-85 in Atlanta, Georgia—where I-75 is dominant—the exit numbers range from 242 to 251, while I-85's highest independent mile marker in Georgia is 179.

== Alternatives ==
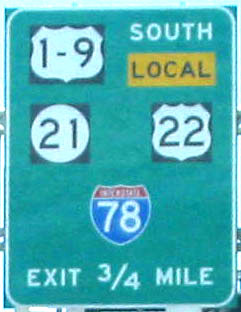
U.S. Route 1/9 concurrency signed on a shield on the Pulaski Skyway

Some brief concurrencies in the past have been eliminated by reassigning the designations along the roadways. This can involve scaling back the terminus of one designation to the end of a concurrent section. At the same time, there could be an extension of another highway designation that is used to replace the newly shortened designation with another one.

Between states, US 27 in Michigan previously ran concurrently with I-69 from the Michigan–Indiana state line to the Lansing, Michigan, area. From there it turned northwards to its terminus at Grayling. In 1999, the Michigan and Indiana departments of transportation petitioned the American Association of State Highway and Transportation Officials for permission to truncate US 27 at Fort Wayne, Indiana. In 2002, Michigan removed the US 27 designation from I-69 and extended the US 127 designation from Lansing to Grayling. MDOT's stated reason for the modification was to "reduce confusion along the US 27/US 127 corridor". After US 27's signage was removed, the highway north of the Lansing area was renumbered US 127, and the US 27 designation was removed from I-69.

Some consolidation schemes involve the use of incorporating two single-digit numbers onto one marker, as along the US 1/9 concurrency in northern New Jersey. In the mid-20th century, California had numerous concurrencies, but the California Legislature removed most of them in a comprehensive reform of highway numbering in 1964.

== Regional examples ==
=== North America ===
==== Canada ====
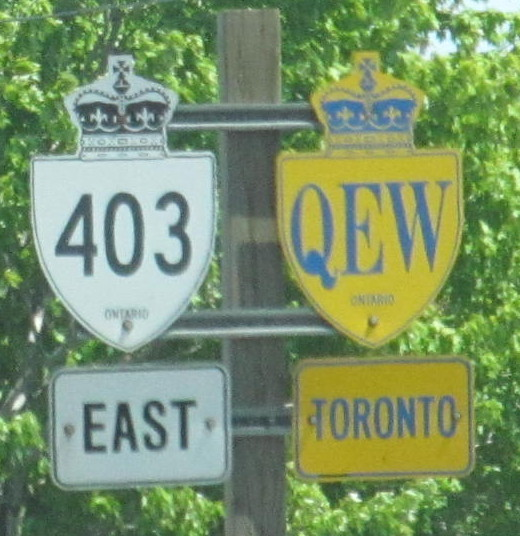
The Queen Elizabeth Way concurrent with Highway 403 in Ontario

Concurrencies are also found in Canada. British Columbia Highway 5 continues east for 12 kilometres (7.5 mi) concurrently with Highway 1 and Highway 97, through Kamloops. This stretch of road, which carries Highway 97 south and Highway 5 north on the same roadway (and vice versa), is the only wrong-way concurrency in British Columbia. Concurrencies are also very common in Quebec. Most notably, the Samuel-de-Champlain Bridge features a concurrency with three Autoroutes: A-10, A-15, and A-20. Another example is A-55, which runs concurrently with A-10, A-20, and A-40, all of which are major highways.

In Ontario, the Queen Elizabeth Way and Highway 403 run concurrently between Burlington and Oakville, forming the province's only concurrency between two 400-series highways. The concurrency was not in the original plan which intended for both the QEW and Highway 403 to run parallel to each other, as the Hamilton–Brantford and Mississauga sections of Highway 403 were initially planned to be linked up along a corridor (later planned to be tolled) now occupied by Highway 407. To avoid forcing drivers to pay tolls to use a section of a continuous Highway 403, the new link was designated as a western extension of the tolled Highway 407, with the Mississauga section of Highway 403 planned to be renumbered as Highway 410. The renumbering to 410 never came to pass, and consequently Highway 403 was signed concurrently along the Queen Elizabeth Way in 2002, remedying the discontinuity. Nonetheless, many surface street signs referring to that section of freeway with the QEW/Highway 403 concurrency still only use the highway's original designation of QEW, although the MTO has updated route markers on the QEW to reflect the concurrency.

At the national level, the Trans-Canada Highway, which does not bear a uniform number in the eastern provinces, follows various provincial highways. In the Atlantic Provinces the main designated TCH route either follows a single numbered route across each province (an exception being the switching of the designation between Nova Scotia Highways 104 and 105), or has branches that are signed exclusively as TCH routes. In Ontario and Quebec, The TCH follows a series of provincial highways, and also has branches that follow sections of others that have concurrencies with it, signed with TCH shields alongside the provincial number.

==== United States ====
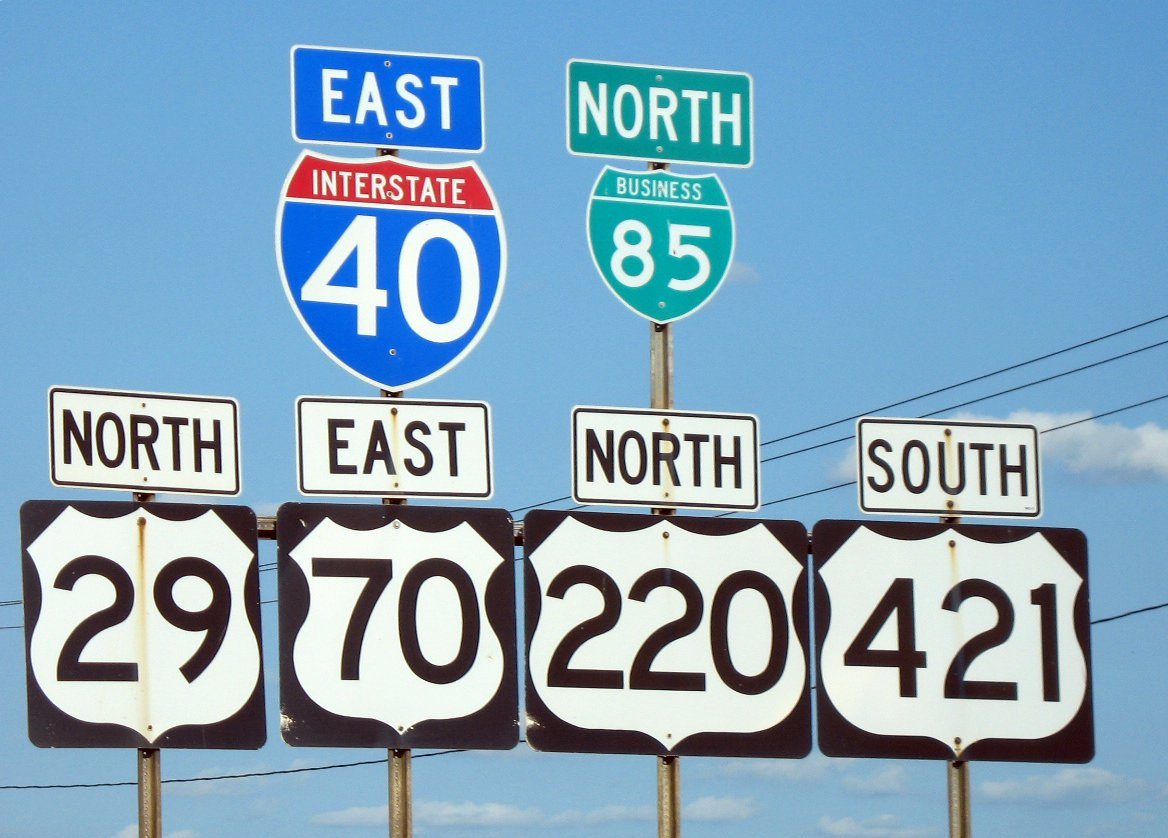
An extreme example in Greensboro, North Carolina, where I-40, I-85 Business, US 29, US 70, US 220, and US 421 formerly ran concurrently (2006)

In the United States, concurrencies are simply marked by placing signs for both routes on the same or adjacent posts. The federal Manual on Uniform Traffic Control Devices prescribes that when mounting these adjacent signs together that the numbers will be arranged vertically or horizontally in order of precedence. The order to be used is Interstate Highways, U.S. Highways, state highways, and finally county roads, and within each class by increasing numerical value.

Several states do not officially have any concurrencies, instead officially ending routes on each side of one. (Note: Arkansas's highways exist in many officially designated "sections" rather than form concurrencies. Arkansas Highway 131 exists in five sections as an example.) There are several circumstances where unusual concurrencies exist along state borders. One example occurs along the Oklahoma–Arkansas state line. At the northern end of this border Oklahoma State Highway 20 runs concurrently with Arkansas Highway 43 and the two highways run north–south along the boundary.

=== Europe ===
==== Mainland Europe ====
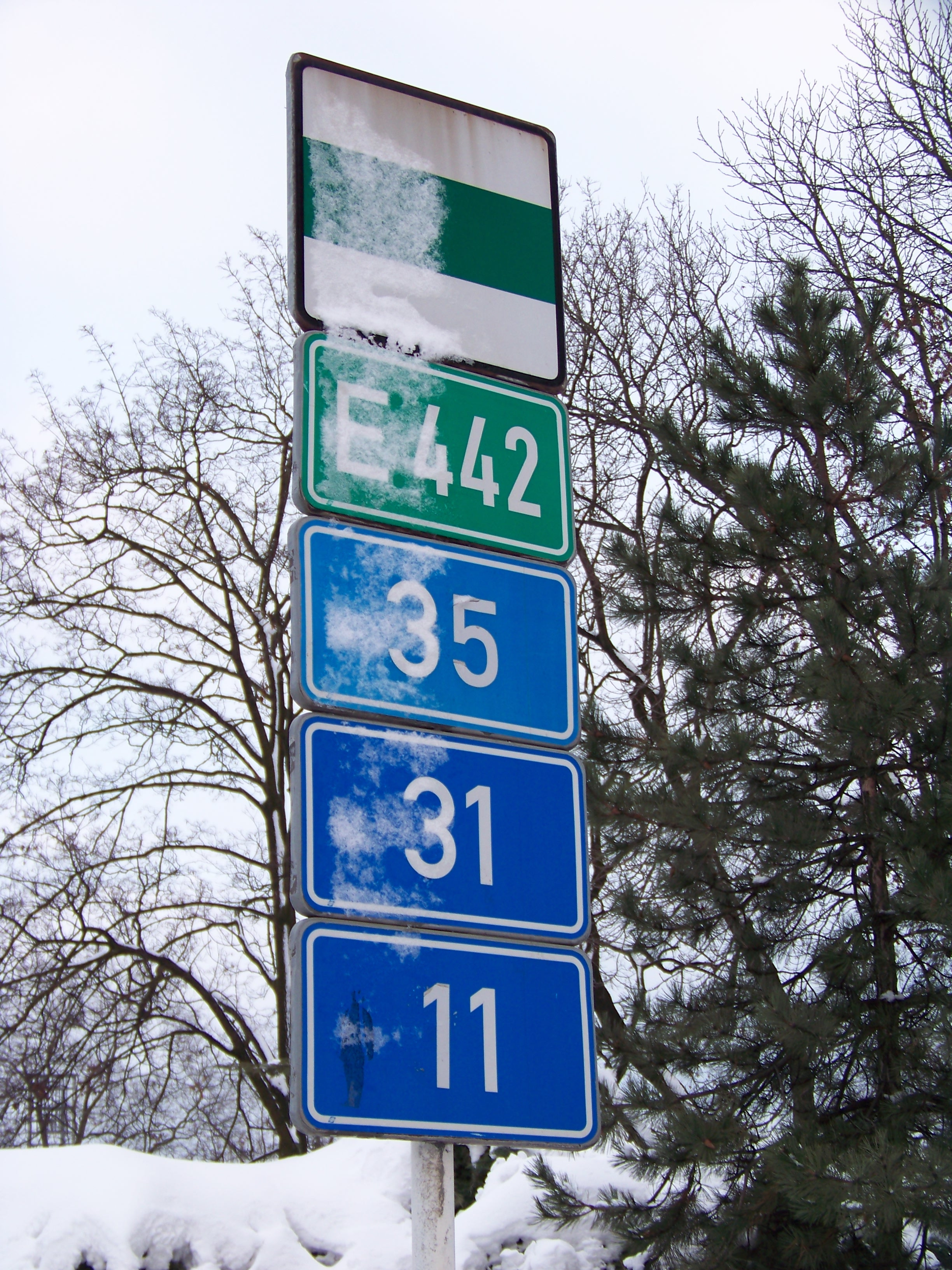
Concurrency of the city beltway, a European road, and three first-class roads in Hradec Králové, Czechia

In a majority of the countries in Europe, the European routes are signed concurrently with national roads. Exceptions include Belgium, Norway, Sweden and Denmark where only European route numbers are used for those roads. Other exceptions include the United Kingdom and Albania, where European routes are not signed at all.

In Sweden and Denmark, the most important highways use only the European route numbers that have cardinal directions. In Sweden the European route E6 and E20 run concurrently for 280 kilometres (170 mi). In Denmark the E47 and E55 run concurrently for 157 kilometres (98 mi). There are more shorter concurrencies. There are two stretches in Sweden and Denmark where three European routes run concurrently; these are E6, E20 and E22 in Sweden, and E20, E47, and E55 in Denmark. Along all these concurrencies, all route numbers are posted with signs.

In Czechia, the European route numbers are only additional, and they are always concurrent with the state route numbering, usually highways or first-class roads. In the state numbering system, concurrences exist only in first-class and second-class roads; third class roads do not have them. The local term for such concurrences is peáž (from the French word péage). In the road register, one of the roads is considered the main ("source") road and the others as the péaging (guest) roads. The official road map enables a maximum of five concurrent routes of the intrastate numbering system. Cycling routes and hiking routes are often concurrent.

==== United Kingdom ====
In the United Kingdom, national routes do not run concurrently with others. Where this would normally occur, the roadway takes the number of only one of the routes (usually, but not always, the most important route), while the other routes are considered to have a gap and are signed in brackets (the equivalent of "to" signs in North America). An example is the meeting of the M60 and the M62 northwest of Manchester: the motorways coincide for the seven miles (11 km) between junctions 12 and 18 but the motorway between those points is only designated as the M60 (although in this case the same junction numbers would also apply to the M62). European route numbers as designated by UNECE may have concurrencies (for instance E15 and E30 around Greater London), but since the E-route numbers are unsigned and unused in the UK, the existence of these concurrencies is purely theoretical.

=== Middle East ===
In Israel, two freeways, the Trans-Israel Highway (Highway 6) and Highway 1, run concurrently just east of Ben Shemen Interchange. The concurrency is officially designated "Daniel Interchange", providing half of the possible interchange directions. It is a one-mile (1.6 km) segment consisting of eight lanes providing high-speed access between the two highways. Access from Highway 1 west to Highway 6 south and Highway 6 north to Highway 1 east is provided via Route 431, while access between Highway 1 east to Highway 6 north and Highway 6 south to Highway 1 west are provided at Ben Shemen Interchange. The other movements are provided through the concurrency.

=== South America ===
==== Brazil ====
In the Brazilian state of Rio Grande do Sul, federal highways BR-386 and BR-158 share a concurrent alignment over a stretch of approximately 67 kilometres (42 mi), running over the exact same pavement between the municipalities of Iraí and Boa Vista das Missões. At Boa Vista das Missões, the two routes diverge; BR-386 continues southeasterly toward Porto Alegre and BR-158 heads southward toward the interior of the state.

== Gallery ==
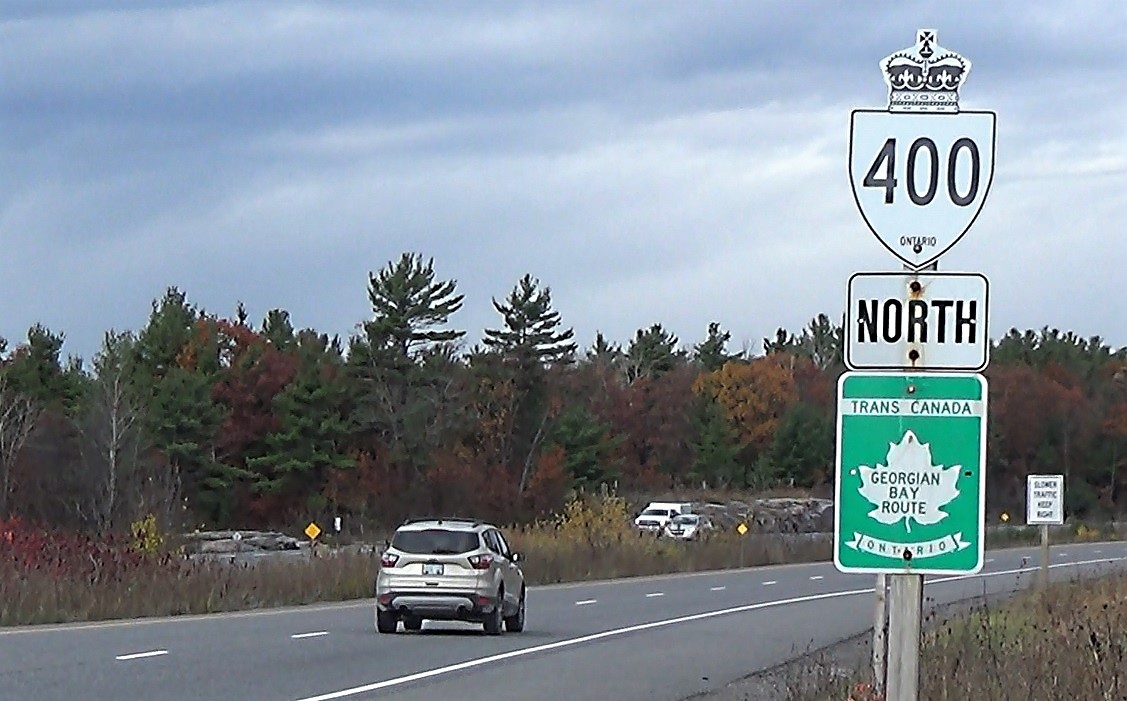
A section of Ontario Highway 400 runs concurrent with a branch of the Trans-Canada Highway.

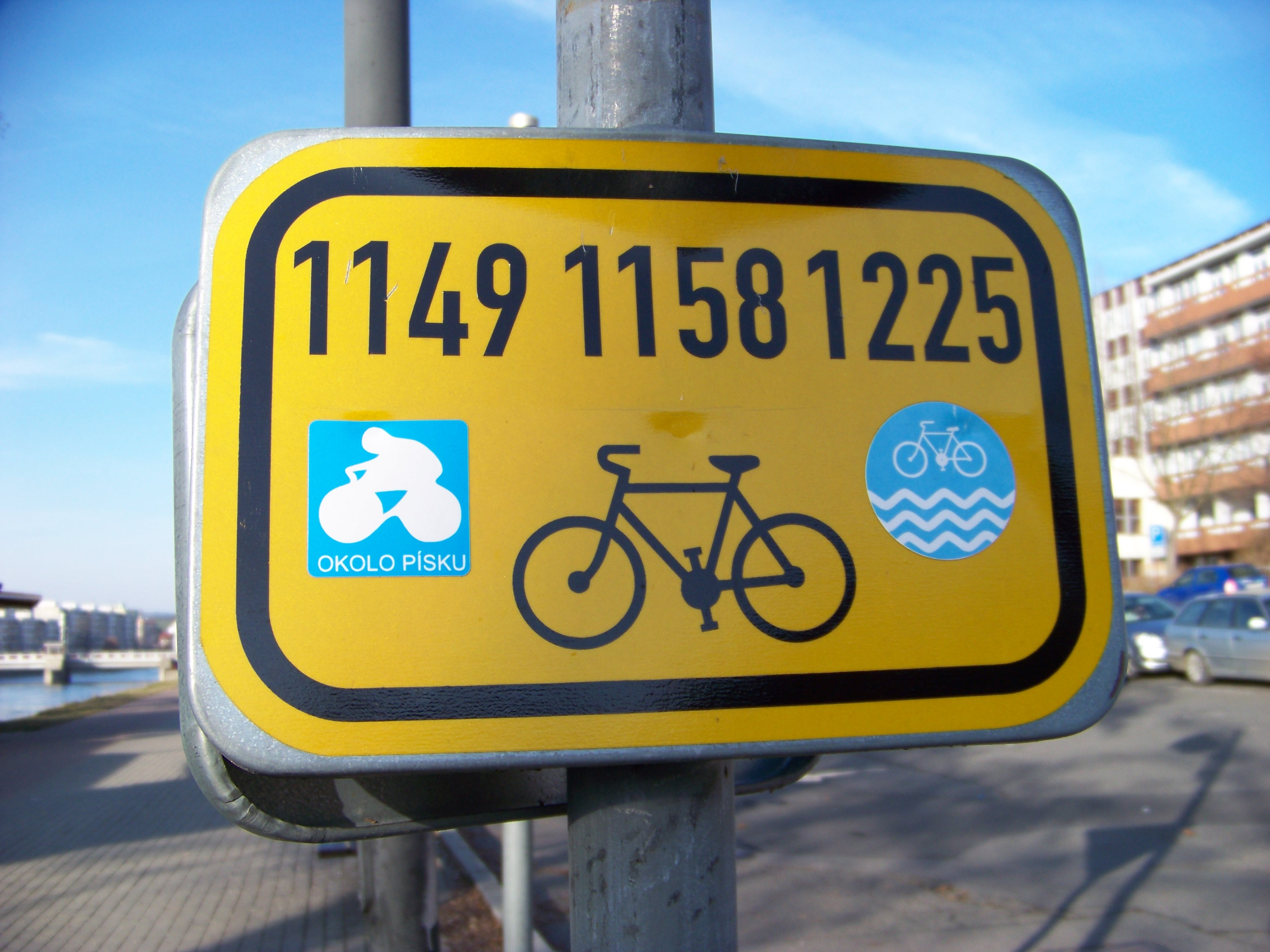
Concurrency of several cycling routes in Písek, Czechia

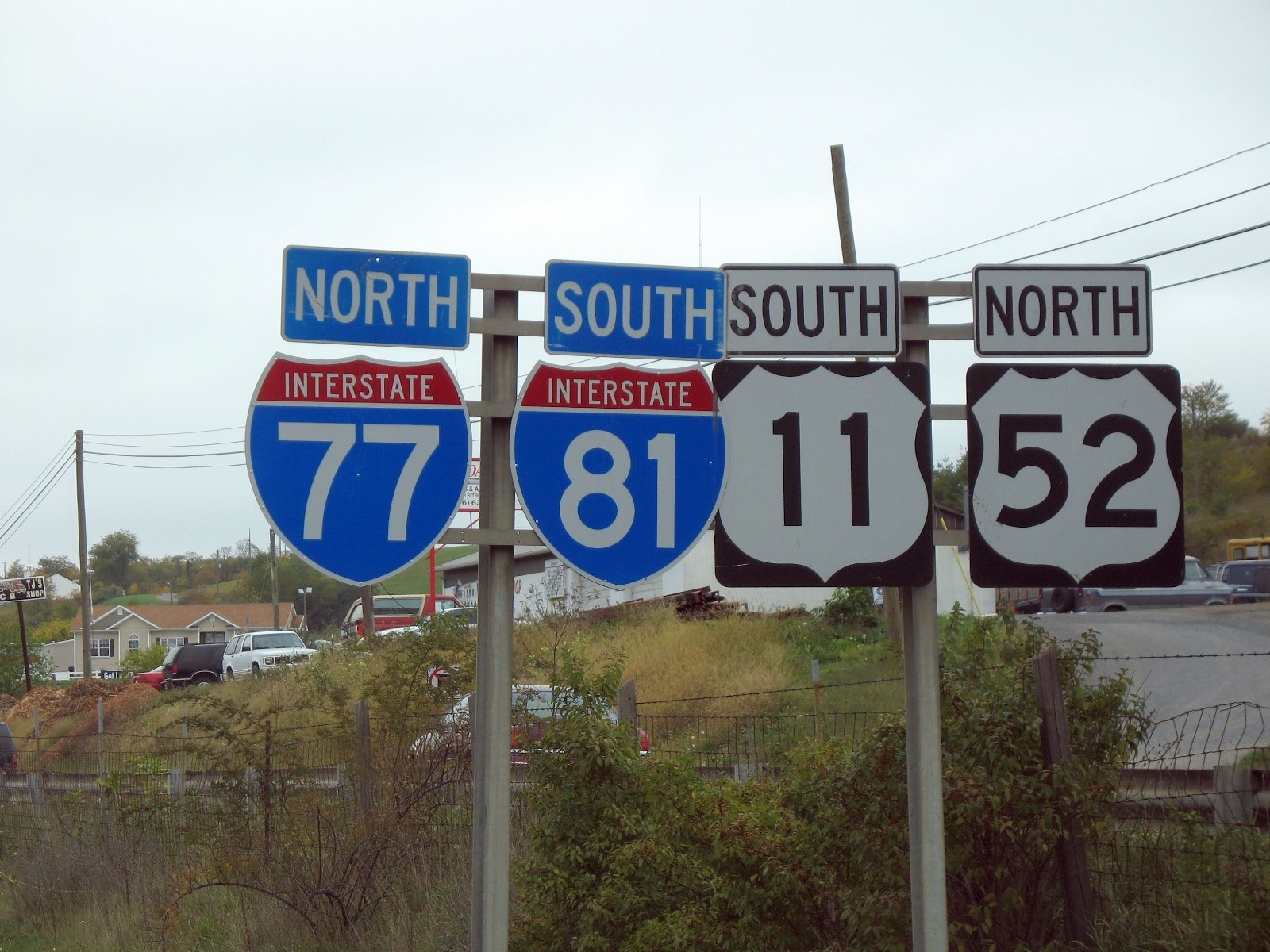
This westbound highway in southwestern Virginia simultaneously carries I-77 and I-81 in opposite directions. The wrong-way concurrency is also reflected in US 52 and US 11, which are concurrent with I-77 and I-81, respectively.
