= BVSC =

BVSC may refer to:

- Bachelor of Veterinary Science
- Buena Vista Social Club (disambiguation)
- Budapesti VSC
