= Buena Vista, Ohio =

Buena Vista is may refer to several places in the state of Ohio:

- Buena Vista, Fayette County, Ohio
- Buena Vista, Hocking County, Ohio
- Buena Vista, Scioto County, Ohio
