= Bonavista =

Bonavista can refer to:

== Geography ==
- Cape Bonavista, a headland in Newfoundland, Canada
- Bonavista Peninsula, a peninsula on the island of Newfoundland, Canada
- Bonavista Bay, a bay of the island of Newfoundland, Canada

== Places ==
=== Australia ===
- Bonavista, Queensland, a town in the Whitsunday Region, Australia

=== Canada ===
- Bonavista, Newfoundland and Labrador, a town in Newfoundland, Canada
- Lake Bonavista, Calgary, a neighbourhood in Calgary, Alberta, Canada

=== Spain ===
- Bonavista (El Pla del Penedès), village in El Pla del Penedès, Barcelona (province), Catalonia, Spain.
- Bonavista (Tarragona), neighborhood of Tarragona, Spain.

== Electoral districts ==
- Bonavista—Gander—Grand Falls—Windsor, a federal electoral district in Newfoundland and Labrador, Canada
- Bonavista—Twillingate, a federal electoral district in Newfoundland and Labrador, Canada
- Bonavista—Trinity—Conception, former federal electoral district in Newfoundland and Labrador, Canada
- Bonavista South, a provincial electoral district of Newfoundland and Labrador, Canada
- Bonavista North, a provincial electoral district of Newfoundland and Labrador, Canada

== Ships ==
- MV Bonavista - a number of ships with this name

== See also ==
- Boa Vista (disambiguation)
- Buenavista (disambiguation)
- Buena Vista (disambiguation)
- Buona Vista (disambiguation)
