= Buenavista =

Buenavista may refer to:

== Colombia ==
- Buenavista, Boyacá, a municipality in the department of Boyacá
- Buenavista, Córdoba, a municipality in the department of Córdoba
- Buenavista, Sucre, a municipality in the department of Sucre
- Buenavista, Quindío, a municipality in the department of Quindío

== Costa Rica ==
- Buenavista District, Guatuso, a Alajuela Province

== Cuba ==
- Buenavista, Havana

== Mexico ==
- BuenaVista, Baja California Sur, a town near Los Barriles, Baja California Sur
- Buenavista de Cuéllar, Guerrero
- Buenavista, Tultitlán, State of Mexico
- Buenavista, Michoacán
- Mission San Francisco Buenavista, a historical designation of Cajeme, Sonora
- Buenavista mine, a copper mine in Cananea, Sonora
- Colonia Buenavista, Cuauhtémoc, Mexico City

== Philippines ==
- Buenavista, Agusan del Norte, a 1st class municipality
- Buenavista, Bohol, a 4th class municipality
- Buenavista, Guimaras, a 2nd class municipality
- Buenavista, Marinduque, a 4th class municipality
- Buenavista, Quezon, a 4th class municipality
- San Jose de Buenavista, Antique, a 1st class municipality
- Buenavista Protected Landscape, a protected area in Quezon
- Buenavista, Ubay, a barangay in Bohol

== Spain ==
- Buenavista, Salamanca, a municipality in the province of Salamanca
- Buenavista (Madrid), a ward of the city of Madrid
- Cerro Buenavista, highest peak of the Sierra de Huétor, Granada
- Buenavista de Abajo and Buenavista de Arriba, two settlements in Breña Alta, La Palma
- Buenavista del Norte, a municipality in Tenerife
- Buenavista de Valdavia, a municipality in the province of Palencia

== United States ==
- Buenavista, Indiana

== See also ==
- Buenavista station (disambiguation)
- Buena Vista (disambiguation)
- Boa Vista (disambiguation)
- Bonavista (disambiguation)
- Buona Vista (disambiguation)
