= Buenavista station =

Buenavista station may refer to:

- Buenavista railway station, co-operated by Ferrocarriles Suburbanos and the government of Mexico
- Buenavista railway station (old), formerly operated by Ferrocarriles Nacionales de México; opened in 1873 and closed in 2001
- Buenavista metro station, a Mexico City Metro station; opened in 1999
- Cablebús Buenavista, an aerial lift station in Mexico City; opened in 2021
- Metrobús Buenavista (Line 1), a BRT station in Mexico City; opened in 2005
- Metrobús Buenavista (Line 3), a BRT station in Mexico City; opened in 2011
- Metrobús Buenavista (Line 4), a BRT station in Mexico City; opened in 2012
- Mexibús Buenavista, a BRT station in Tultitlán, State of Mexico; opened in 2015

== See also ==
- Buenavista (disambiguation)
- Buona Vista MRT station, a MRT station in Queenstown, Singapore; opened in 1988
