= Buena Vista, Wisconsin =

Buena Vista, Wisconsin may refer to:

- Buena Vista, Grant County, Wisconsin
- Buena Vista, Portage County, Wisconsin
- Buena Vista, Richland County, Wisconsin
- Buena Vista, Waukesha County, Wisconsin

== See also ==
- Buena Vista (disambiguation)
