= Buena Vista Historic District (Tennessee) =

Historic district in Nashville, Tennessee

- U.S. National Register of Historic Places
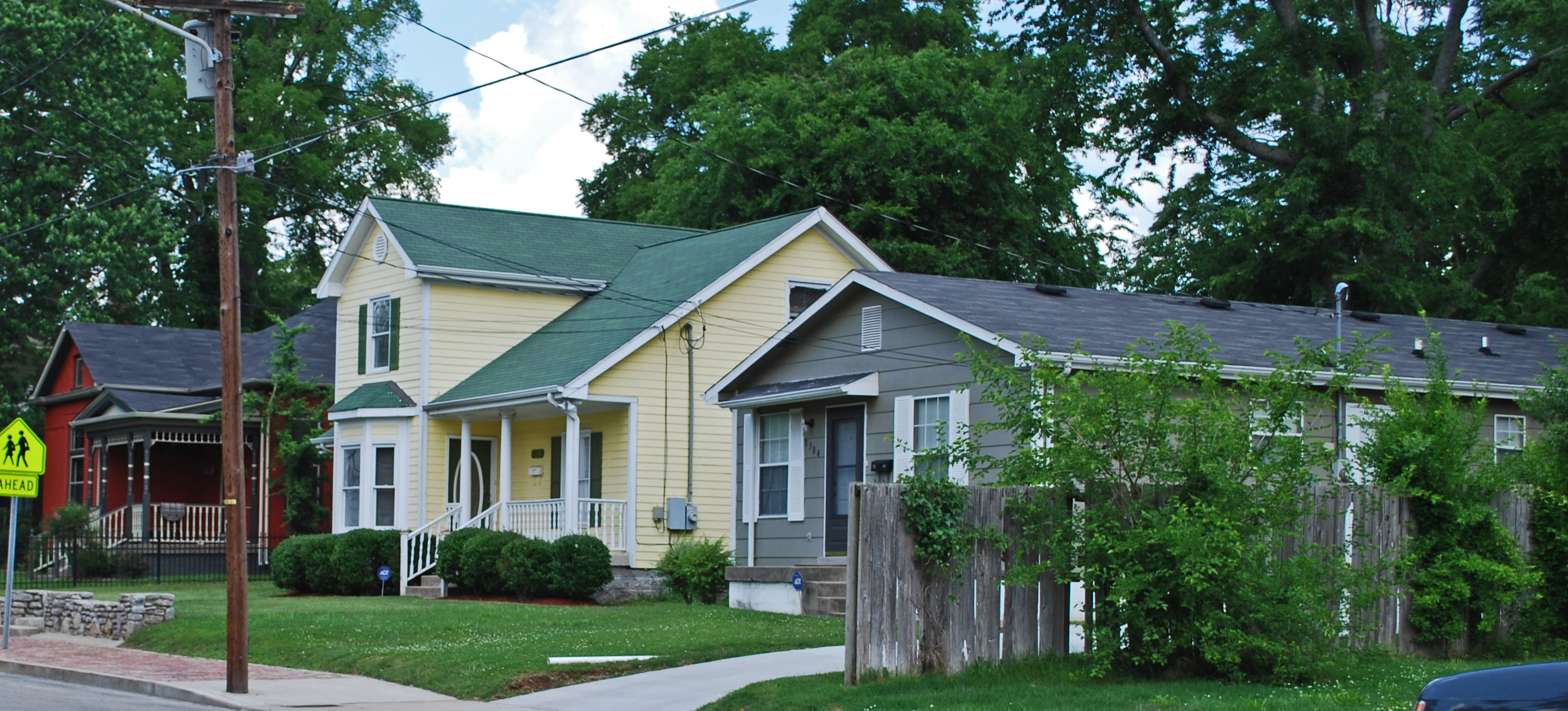
- Homes in the Buena Vista Historic District

- Location within Tennessee Location within the United States
- Location: Nashville, Tennessee
- Coordinates: 36.176111°N 86.797222°W
- Built: 1875–1899 and 1900–1924
- Architect: Multiple
- Architectural style: Eastlake architecture; Gothic Revival architecture; Italianate architecture: Romanesque architecture; Stick architecture; Victorian architecture
- NRHP reference No.: 80003786
- Added to NRHP: April 24, 1980

Buena Vista Historic District is a historic neighborhood in Nashville, Tennessee. The district is at Interstate 265 in Tennessee and U.S. Route 41. It was listed on the National Register of Historic Places listings in Davidson County, Tennessee (NRHP) on April 24, 1980.

== History ==
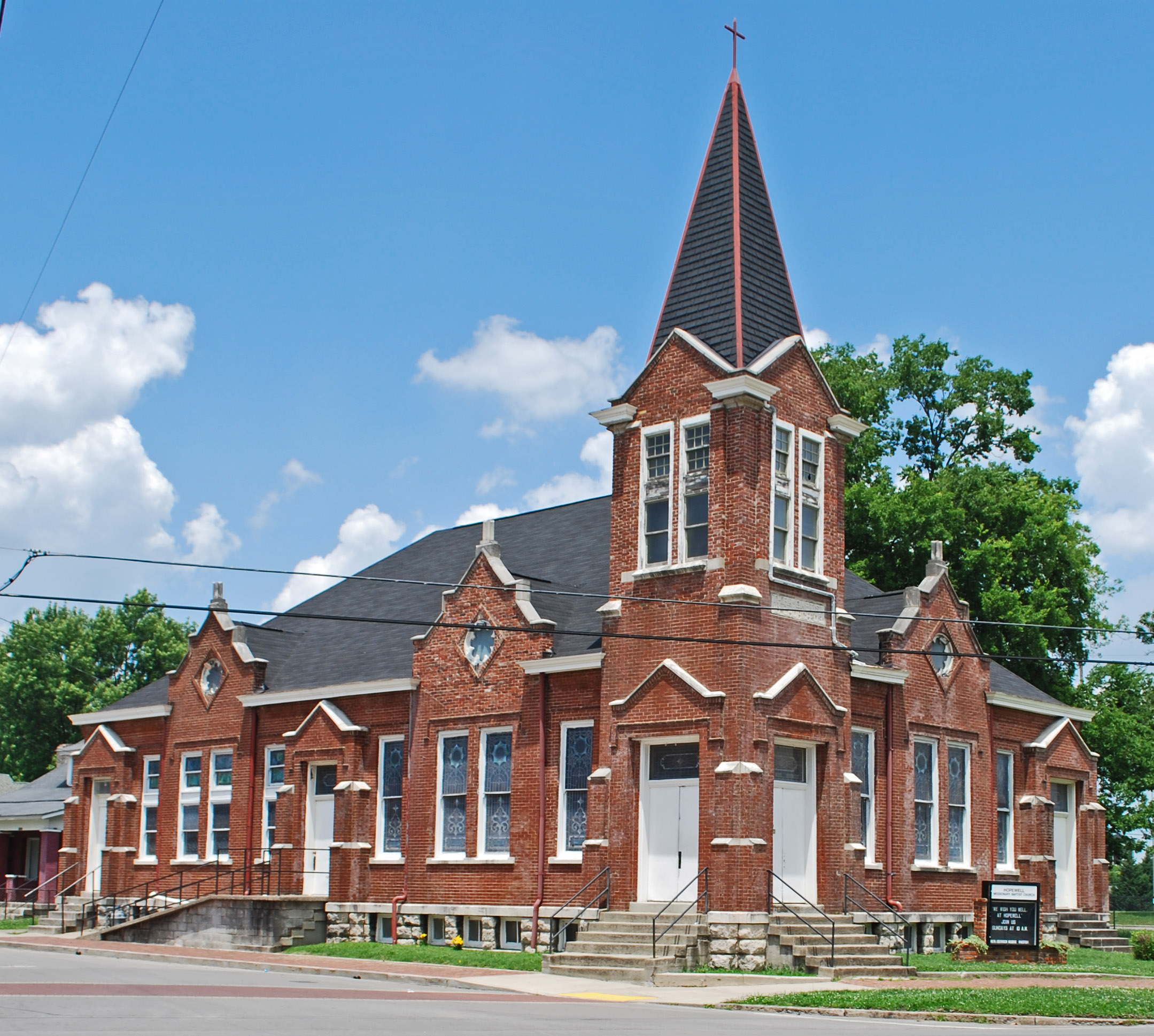
Hopewell Baptist Church

It is a 10 block area with 223 structures. There are tree-lined avenues and sidewalks constructed of bricks. Within the district are several school buildings, churches, a library and commercial buildings. The neighborhood was formed during the late nineteenth and early twentieth centuries and the structures feature many different architectural styles.

In 2018, the News channel 5 Nashville reported that the neighborhood was becoming unaffordable. Developers had begun constructing expensive homes and residents were forced to pay higher property taxes.

A tornado destroyed a 108-year-old structure called the Hopewell Baptist Church in Buena Vista. It was subsequently rebuilt and it reopened in 2022. The church was an important Buena Vista landmark because it was frequented by German and African American people of North Nashville and it was designed by notable architect Henry Gibel.
