= Buena Vista Township =

Buena Vista Township may refer to:

- Buena Vista Township, Schuyler County, Illinois
- Buena Vista Township, Clayton County, Iowa
- Buena Vista Charter Township, Michigan
- Buena Vista Township, New Jersey
