= Pop journalism =

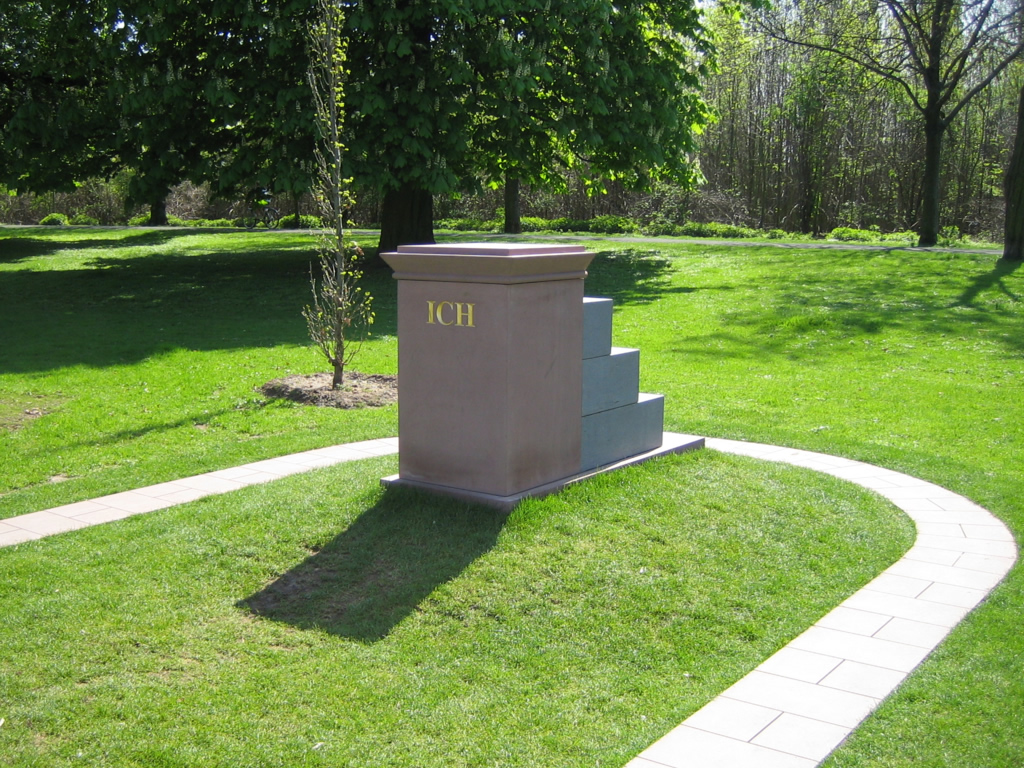
Hans Traxler: Ich-Memorial (‚Ich' — German for I), Frankfurt am Main

Pop journalism (German: Popjournalismus) is a form of journalism, that appeared under the influence of the American New Journalism in the mid-60s in Germany and coined the writing right down to the literature. This was most evident in Jörg Fauser’s writing.

== Definition ==
It is defined as follows: "pop journalism: an art of entertainment — without that invisible line, separating entertainment and arts so often from each other." Neutert not only praised the onomatopoetic "bombshell" of the little word pop, but also the term’s inherent "meaning variety, non-normativity, openness."

== Characteristics ==
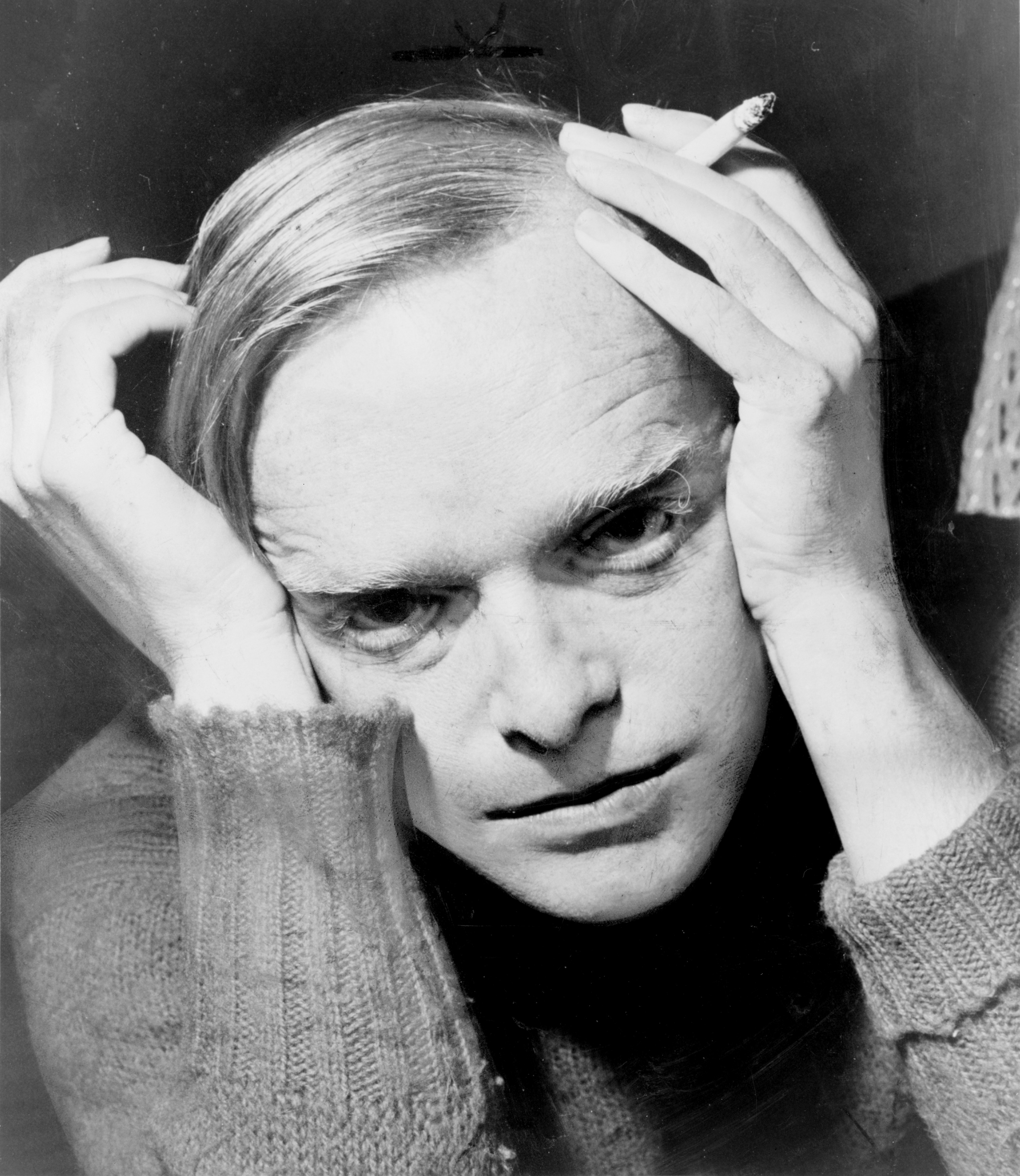
Truman Capote, one of German's models

It is a hybrid genre, interlinking journalistic and literary approaches, characterized by using a first-person narrative. Its style is more literary than journalistic, emphasizing "truth" over strict "facts," and subjectivity instead of objectivity, aesthetic pleasure instead of sobriety. Pop journalists are not disinterested observers, but immerse themselves; they are an integral part of their reports.

== Exponents ==
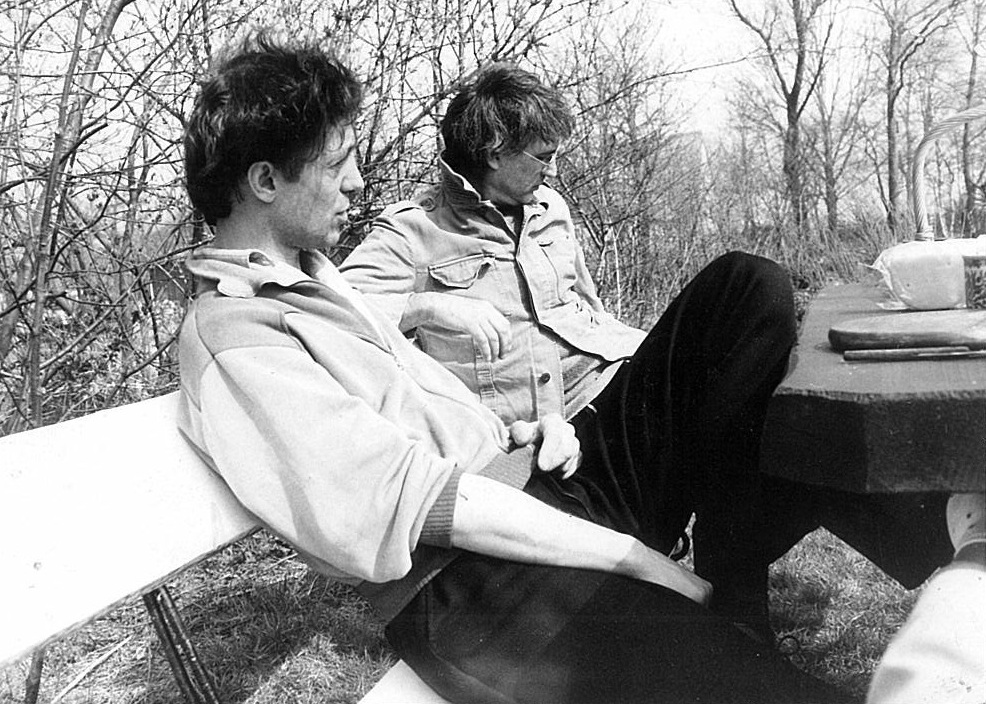
Natias Neutert und Helmut Salzinger, two of the three earliest pop journalists

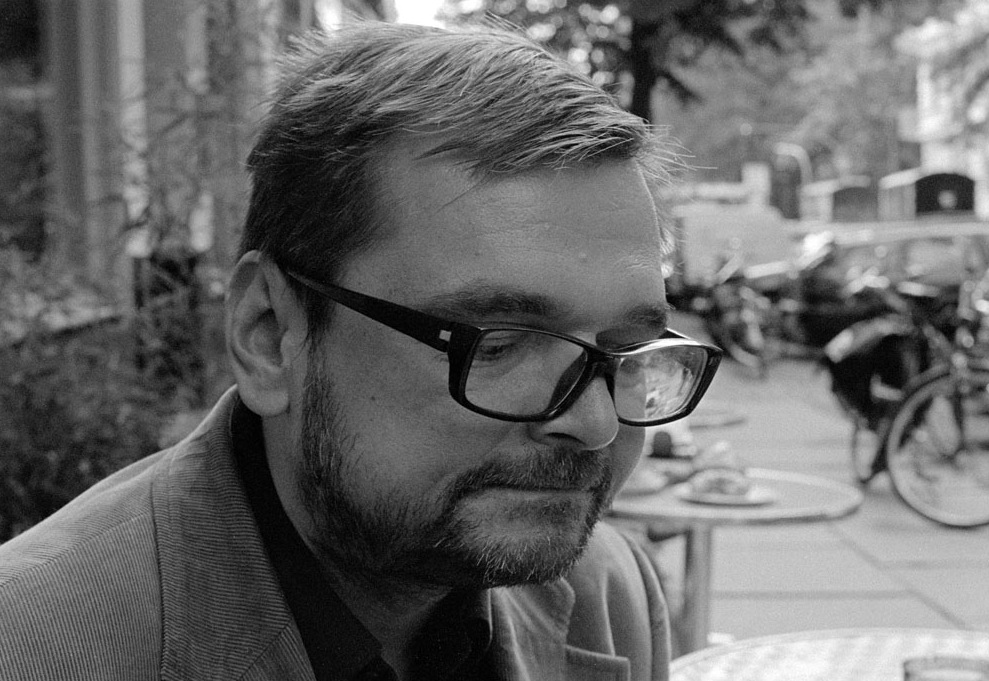
Diedrich Diederichsen, exponent of the 'SPEX-era'

Following American formal models and blending them with the rich history of German literature, the very first exponents of pop journalism were Uwe Nettelbeck, Natias Neutert, and Helmut Salzinger, all living in or near Hamburg. They first wrote for Die Zeit, then for different newspapers and magazines including the Süddeutsche Zeitung, the Frankfurter Rundschau, Twen, and Sounds. Their unusual articles provided a good basis for the subsequent exponents of pop journalism such as Clara Drechsler, Diedrich Diederichsen, and Jutta Koether, published in Spex (magazine). In one way or another, all these writers influenced the phenomenon of pop literature. Telling examples are the bestseller Faserland by Christian Kracht.
