= Sympathy (music) =

Sympathy (Greek συμπάθεια (sympatheia), from σύν (syn) "together" and πάθος (pathos) "passion", in this case an affection) is a short piece of instrumental, music, a type of bagatelle, that at the same time is a homage, a requiem for a special person.

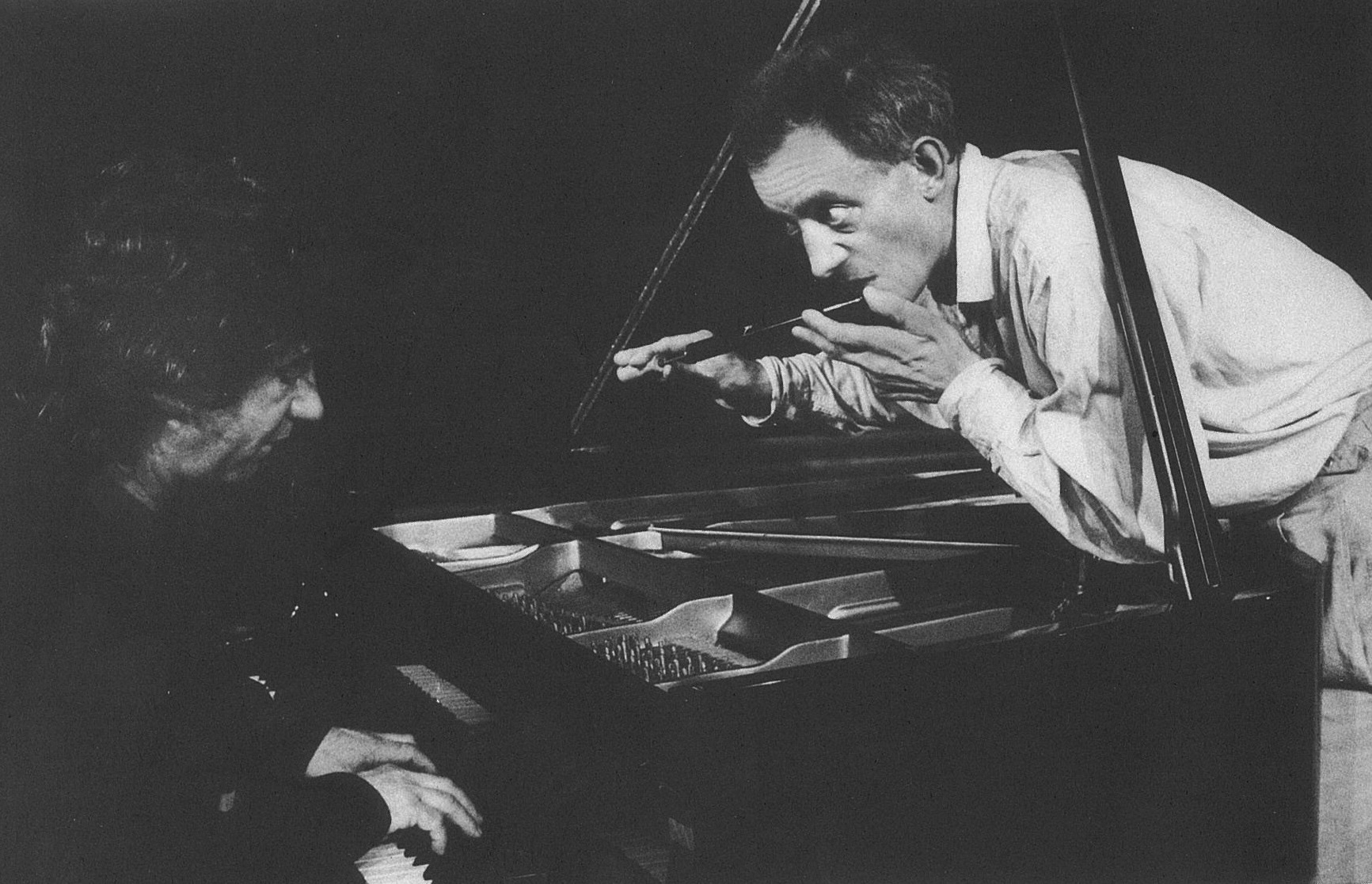
Peter Adrian Wulff and Natias Neutert, performing a 'sympathy' in 1988

== Origin ==
The earliest use of the name "sympathy" for instrumental musical work was by the German performer, poet, musician and thinker Natias Neutert. He introduced the word sympathy into the terminology of experimental music and performance art with his musical performance, titled Sympathy for Piano and Pump.

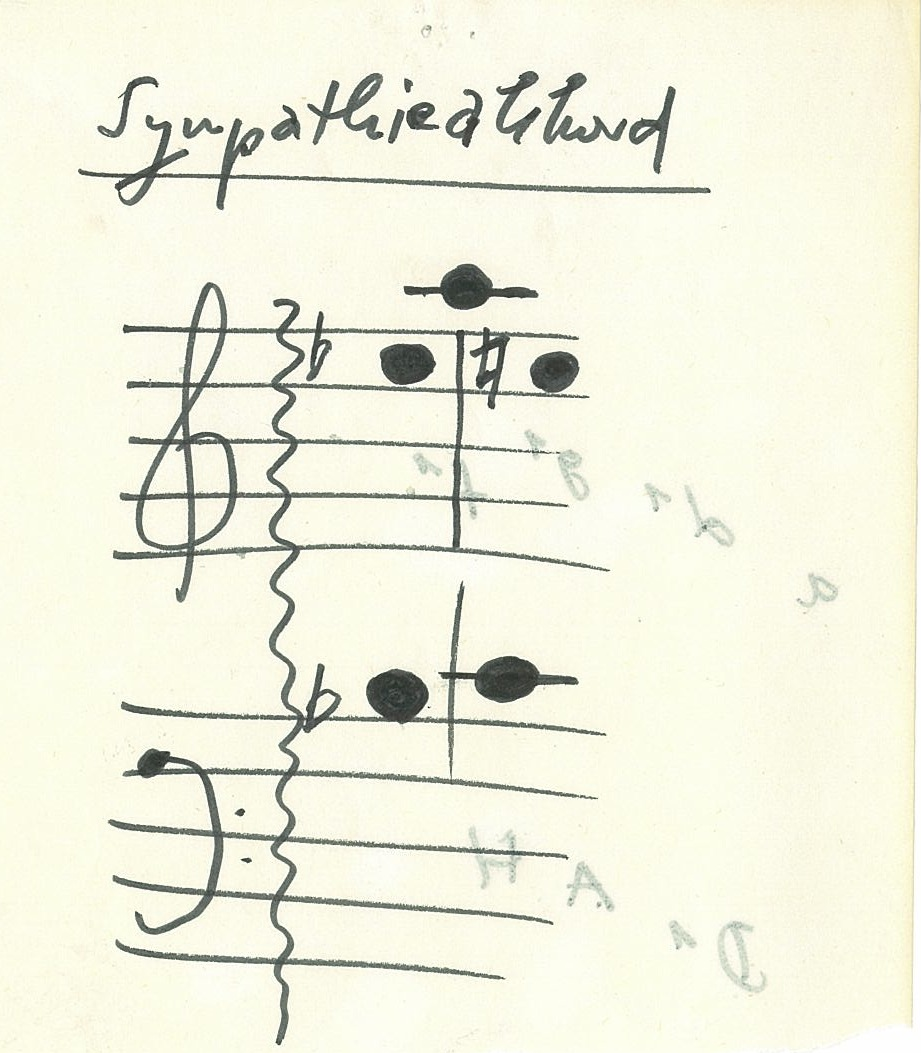
Sympathy Chord written by Natias Neutert, Faksimile 1987

== Premiere ==
The premiere of Natias Neutert's concerto within the frame of Berlin as Cultural City of Europe 1988 happened in the Martin-Gropius-Bau. It was a "kind of requiem for the great teacher Joseph Beuys whose use of a pneumatic pump as a sculptural object has inspired Neutert to convert it for this concerto into an unusual musical instrument."

By virtue of his playing, pianist Adrian Wulff produces spacious arcs of sounds, and Neutert, the composer, performer and flute player himself, charms the finest sounds out of the unusual 'magic flute.'

== Revival ==
At the special wish of director Werner Hofmann, who had deposited a drawing by Neutert in the collection under (Inventory no. 1988/302), the musical performance Sympathy for Piano and Pump should also take place in the Hamburger Kunsthalle. This was made possible only because the enthusiastic exhibition organizer Harald Szeemann financed the rental of the grand piano twice with a large sum of money.
