= Buona Vista (disambiguation) =

Buona Vista is a housing estate located in the subzones of One-north, Queenstown, Singapore.

Buona Vista may also refer to:

- Buona Vista MRT station, a Mass Rapid Transit station that serves the northernmost portion of One-north, Singapore
- Buona Vista Battery, site of two British 15" guns, Singapore

== See also ==
- Boa Vista (disambiguation)
- Bonavista (disambiguation)
- Buena Vista (disambiguation)
- Buenavista (disambiguation)
