= Buena Vista Park (disambiguation) =

Buena Vista Park is a park and/or neighborhood in San Francisco, California

Or it may refer to:

- Buena Vista Park, a neighborhood in Severn, Ontario
- Buena Vista Park Historic District or its park or neighborhood, in Tulsa, Oklahoma
- Buena Vista Park (Edmonton), a park part of the North Saskatchewan River valley parks system in Edmonton, Alberta

== See also ==
- Buena Vista (disambiguation)
