= One-Mensch-Theater =

Genre of single-person theater

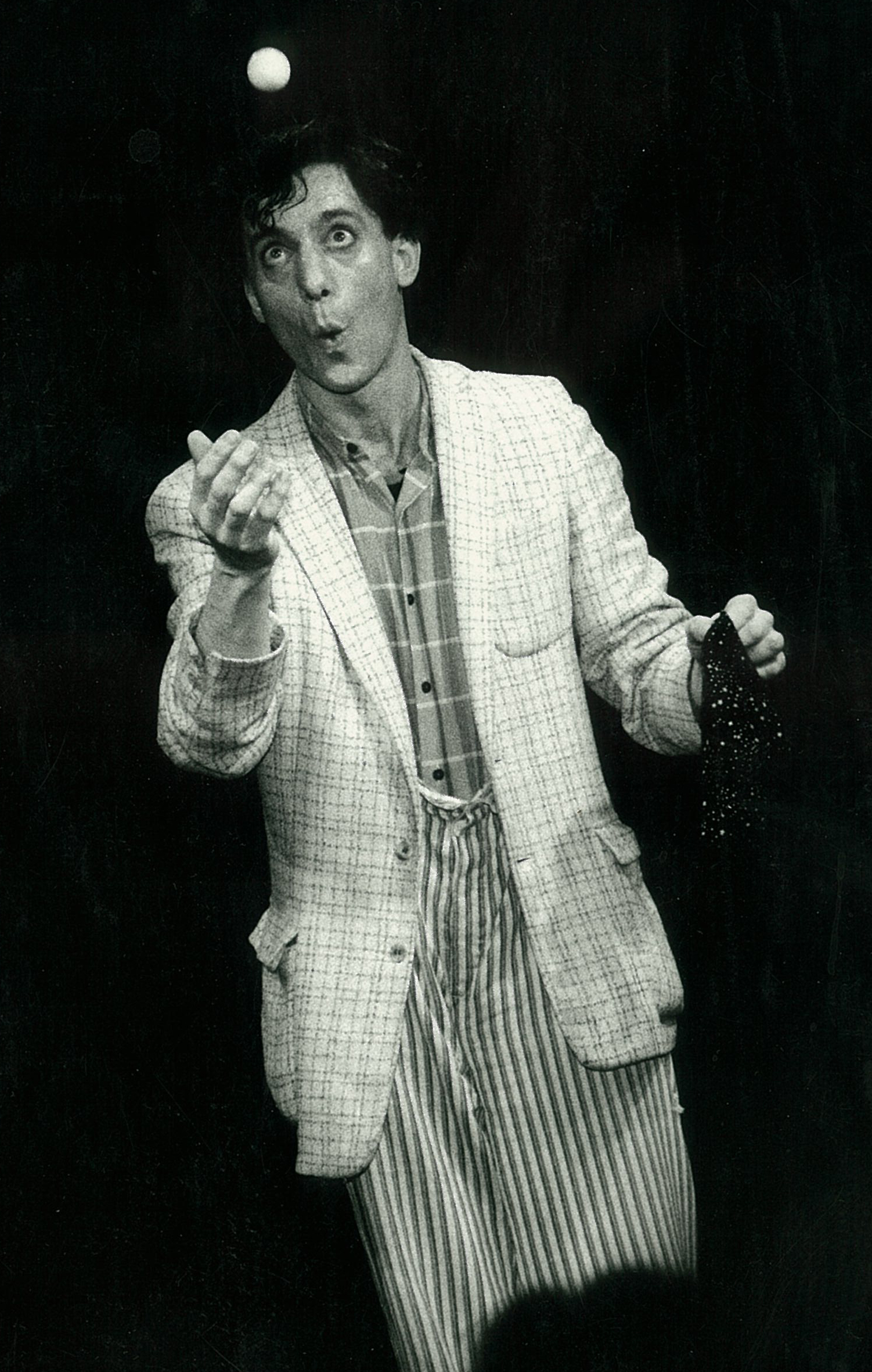
One-Mensch-Theater Natias Neutert, at Arena, Vienna 1982

Ein-Mensch-Theater (German: Mensch "human being") is a German expression for a traveling theater, within the owner is writer, director, stage designer, performer and sometimes even his own tour manager in one person.

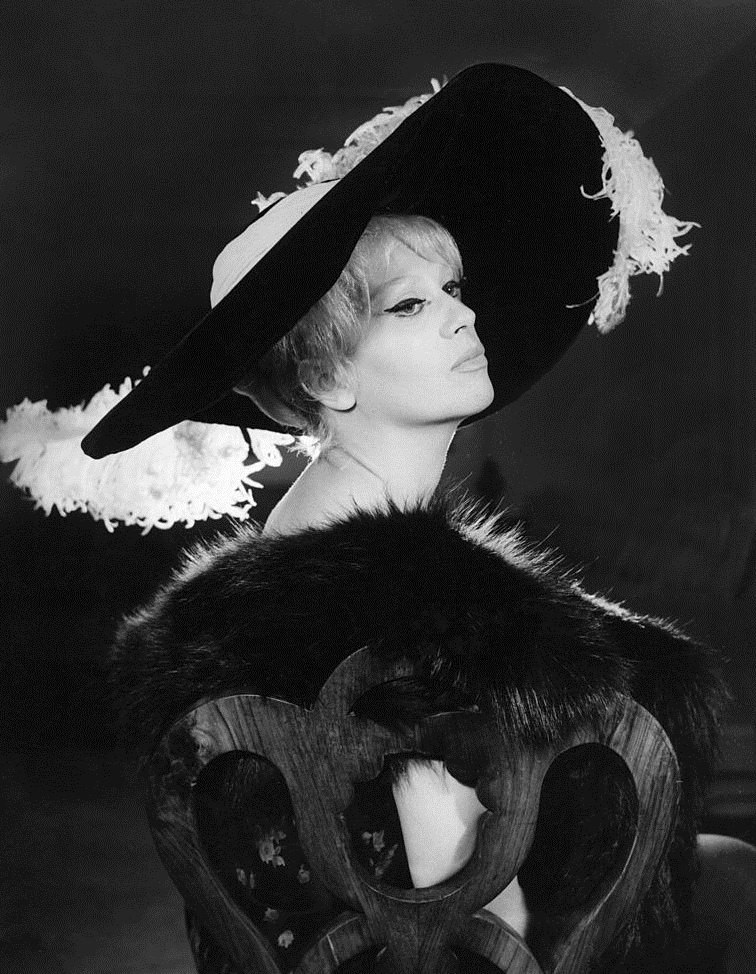
Franca Rame, at the Italian TV-show "Canzonissima",1962

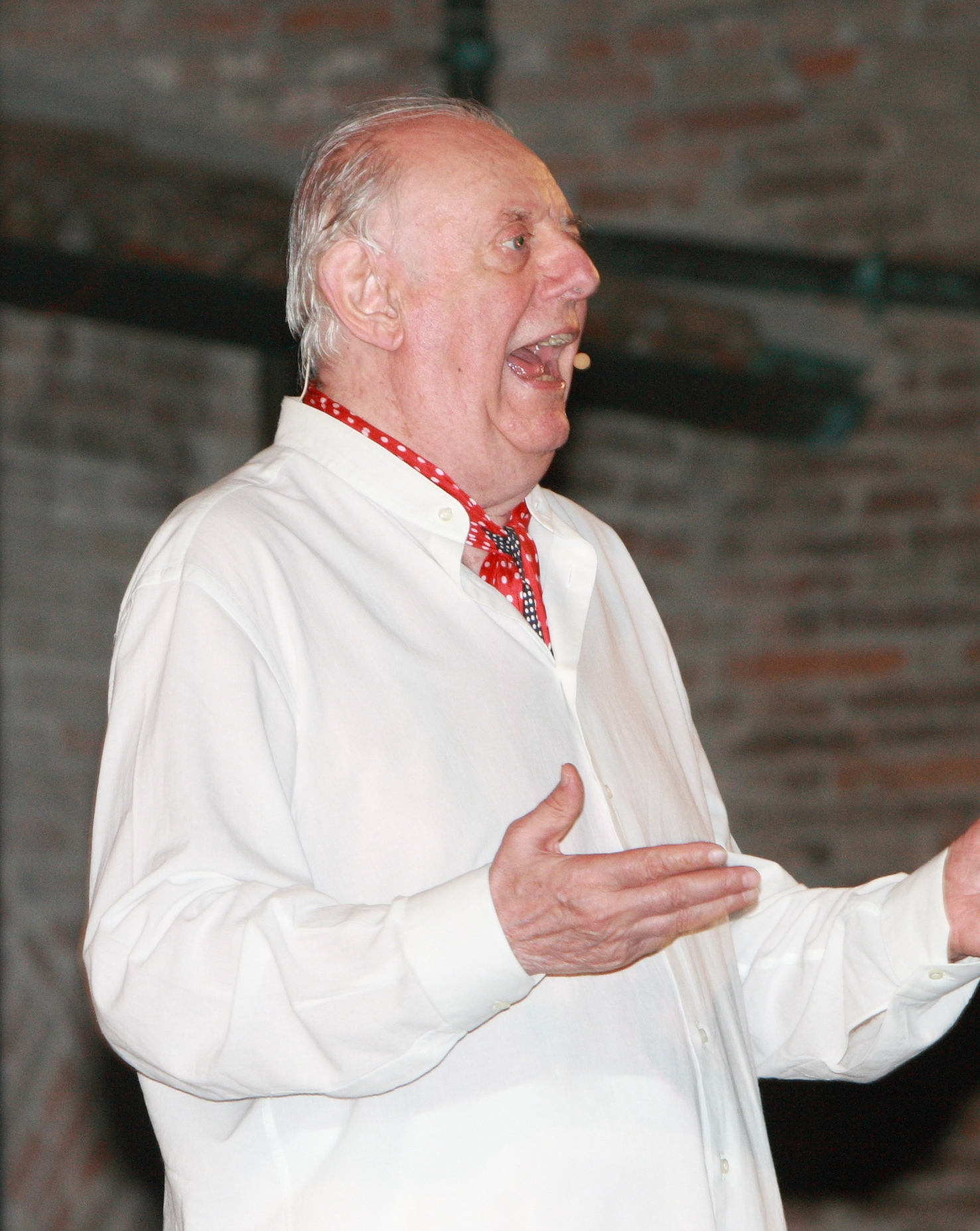
Nobel Prize winner Dario Fo in Cesena, Italy, 2008

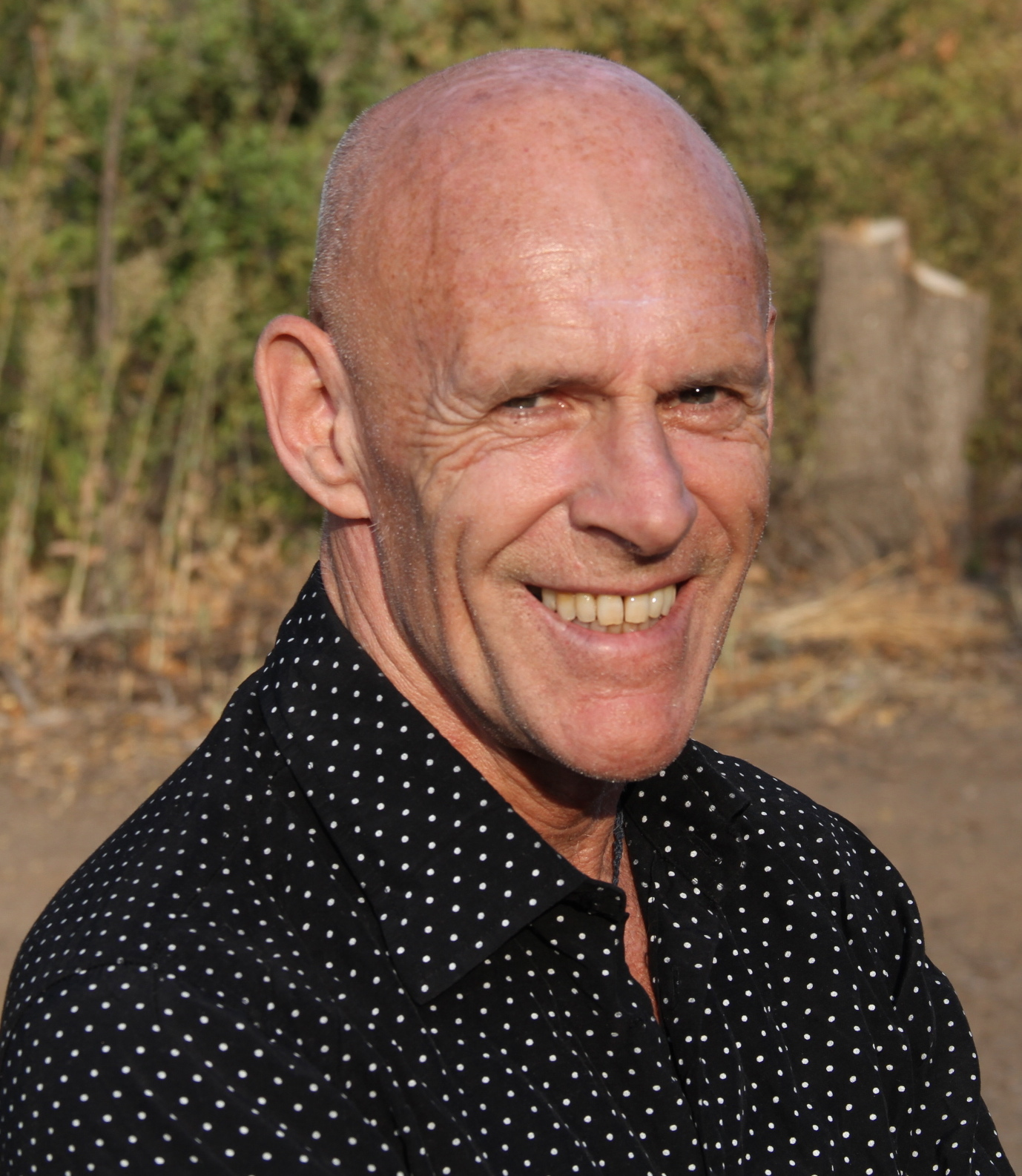
Johnny Melville, 2012

== Origin ==
The term was coined by Natias Neutert after his performance (The poet reels into the Open) at Schauspielhaus Bochum during a panel discussion with Peter Zadek

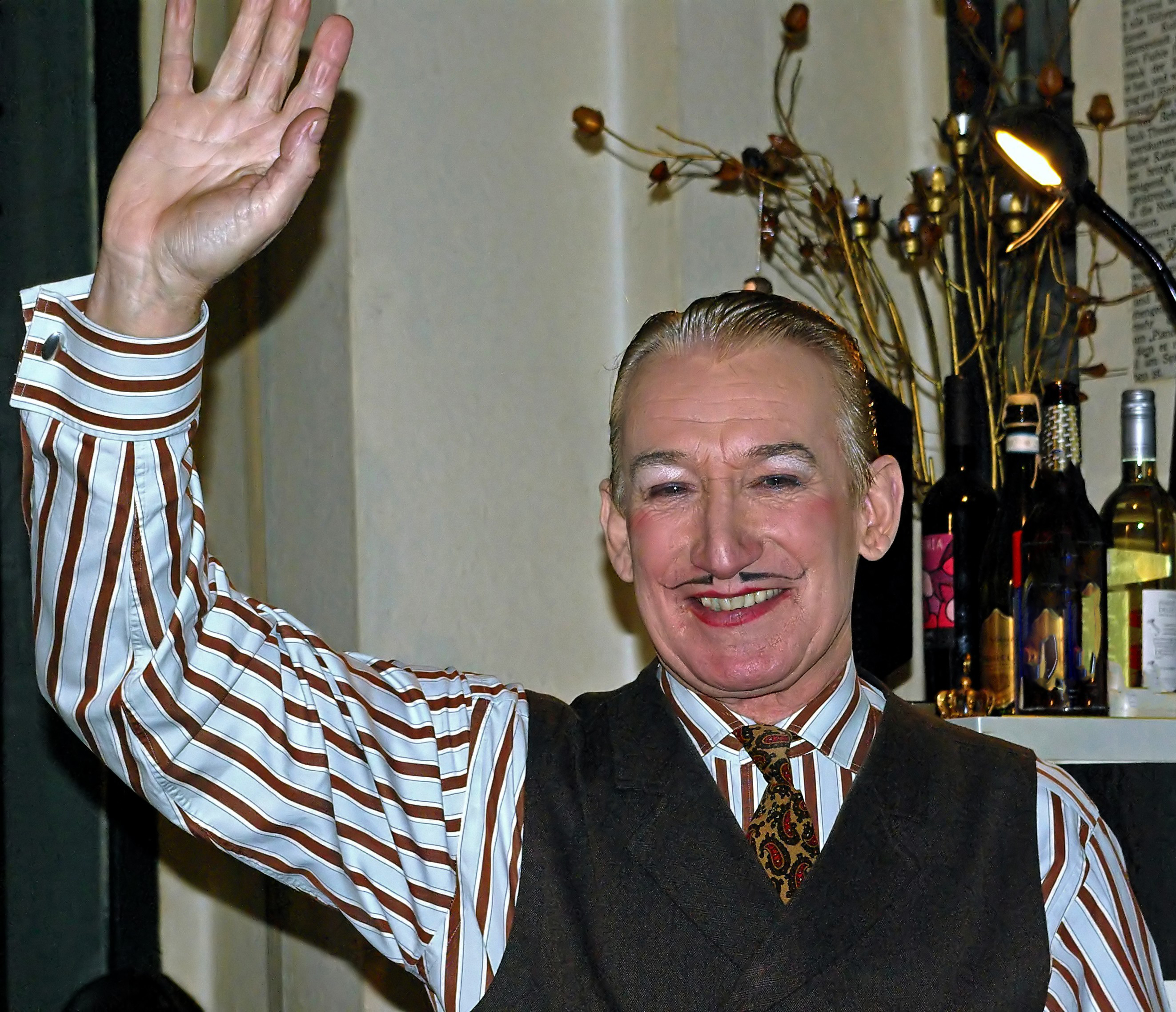
Robert Kreis at «Peety's», Köln 2013

== Goal ==
His intention was going to replace the worn and partial label one-man show by a label under which both males and females could find equally.

== Exponents ==
Dario Fo, Robert Kreis, Johnny Melville, Natias Neutert and Franca Rame became famous exponents as this type of theater in Europe.

== See also ==
- Commedia dell'arte
- Monodrama
- Monologue
