= Boa Vista, Paraíba =

Boa Vista
- Municipality
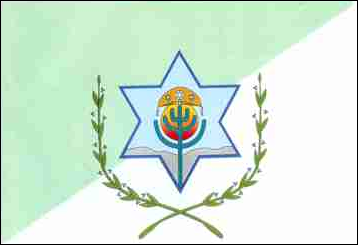
- Flag

- Location in Brazil
- Coordinates: 7°15′32″S 36°14′24″W
- Country: Brazil
- Region: Northeast
- State: Paraíba
- Mesoregion: Agreste Paraibano

Population (2020)
  - Total: 7,136
- Time zone: UTC−3 (BRT)

Boa Vista (Central northeastern portuguese pronunciation: [ˈboɐ ˈviʃtɐ]) is a municipality in the state of Paraíba in the Northeast Region of Brazil.

== See also ==
- List of municipalities in Paraíba
