= Internationale Walter Benjamin Gesellschaft =

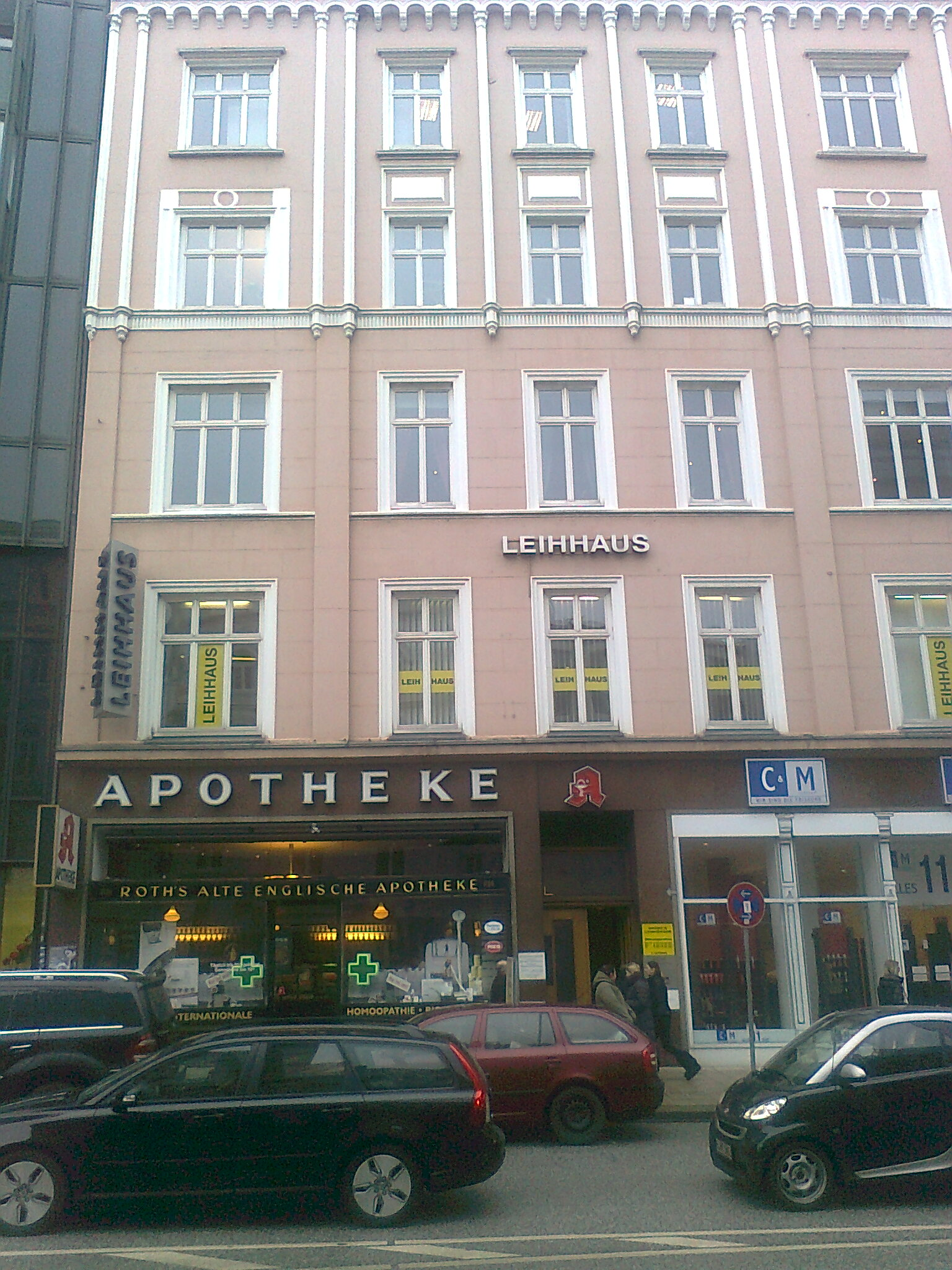
Site of the first International Walter Benjamin Society, Jungfernstieg No 48, Hamburg

The first Internationale Walter Benjamin Gesellschaft [ɡəˈzɛlʃaft] (generally translated as "community" or "society"), here understood as "commune", was a founding within the 68er-Bewegung in Hamburg, at the time when the American Counterculture reached Europe's students.

== Formation ==
Founded by Natias Neutert in 1968 and supported by Hubert Fichte and other cultural patrons, the institute worked until the end of 1973.

== Goals ==
The institute sought to intensify the knowledge of Walter Benjamin's works. One important goal of the society was to propagate and promote Benjamin to a global prototype of theory of revolutionary change such as Marx. Another important goal was to combine Benjamin's elitist insights with the mass phenomenon of Pop music.

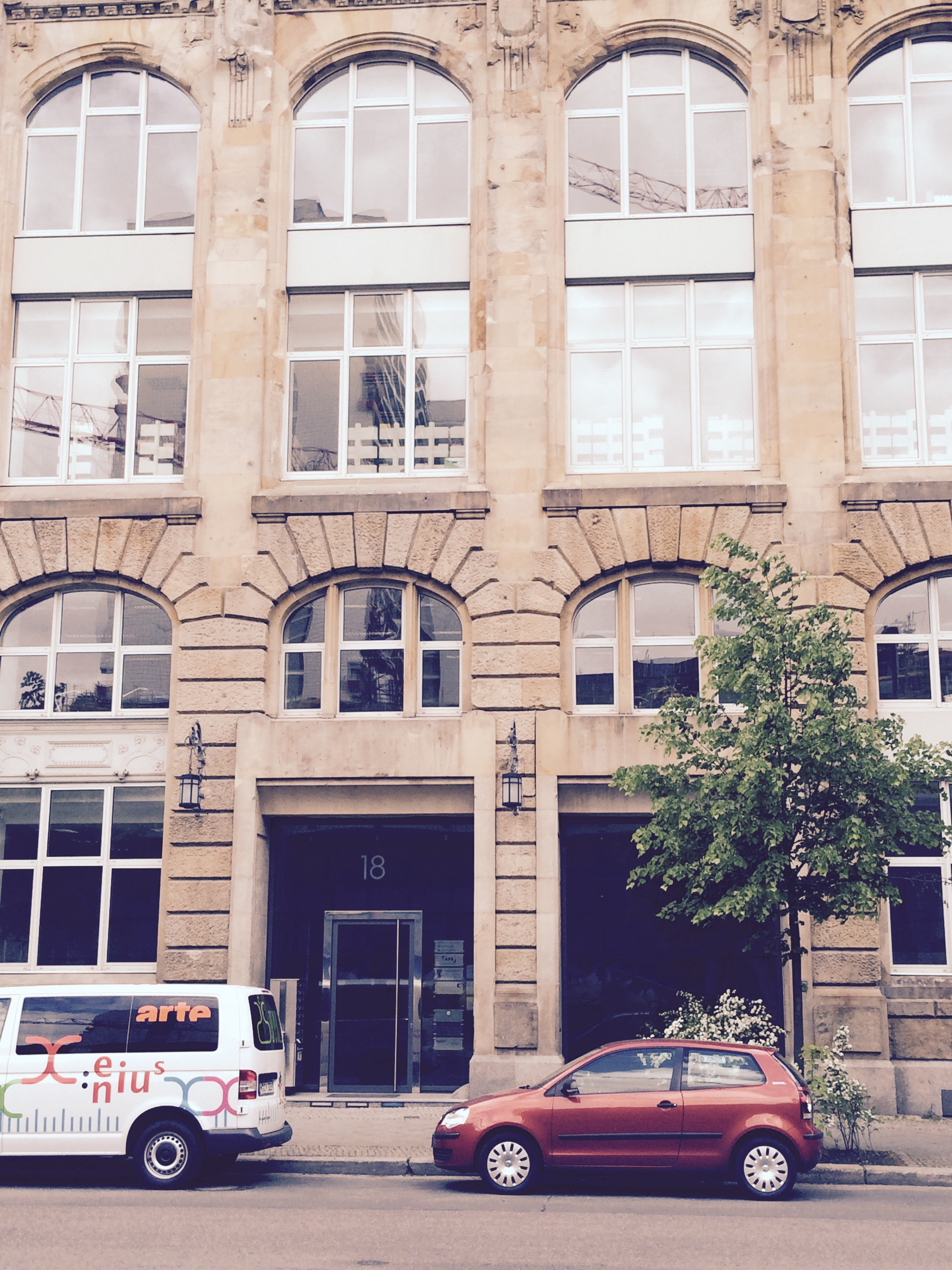
Site of the new International Walter Benjamin Society, Schützenstraße No 18, Berlin

== Re-Establishment ==
A globally orientated discourse has been launched by a new International Walter Benjamin Society in Berlin in 2000. It wishes to bring together "scientists and interested readers from all over the world" and organizes "large conferences every two years to Walter Benjamin, and related topics"

== See also ==
- Walter Benjamin
