= Boa Vista da Aparecida =

Coordinates: 25.4358°S 53.4078°W

- Municipality
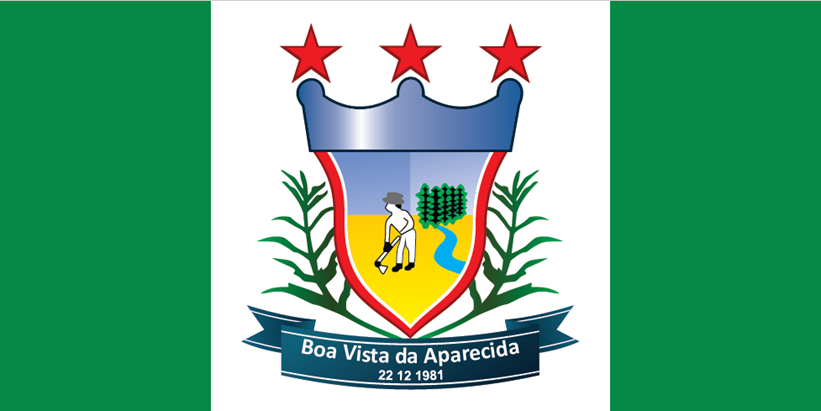
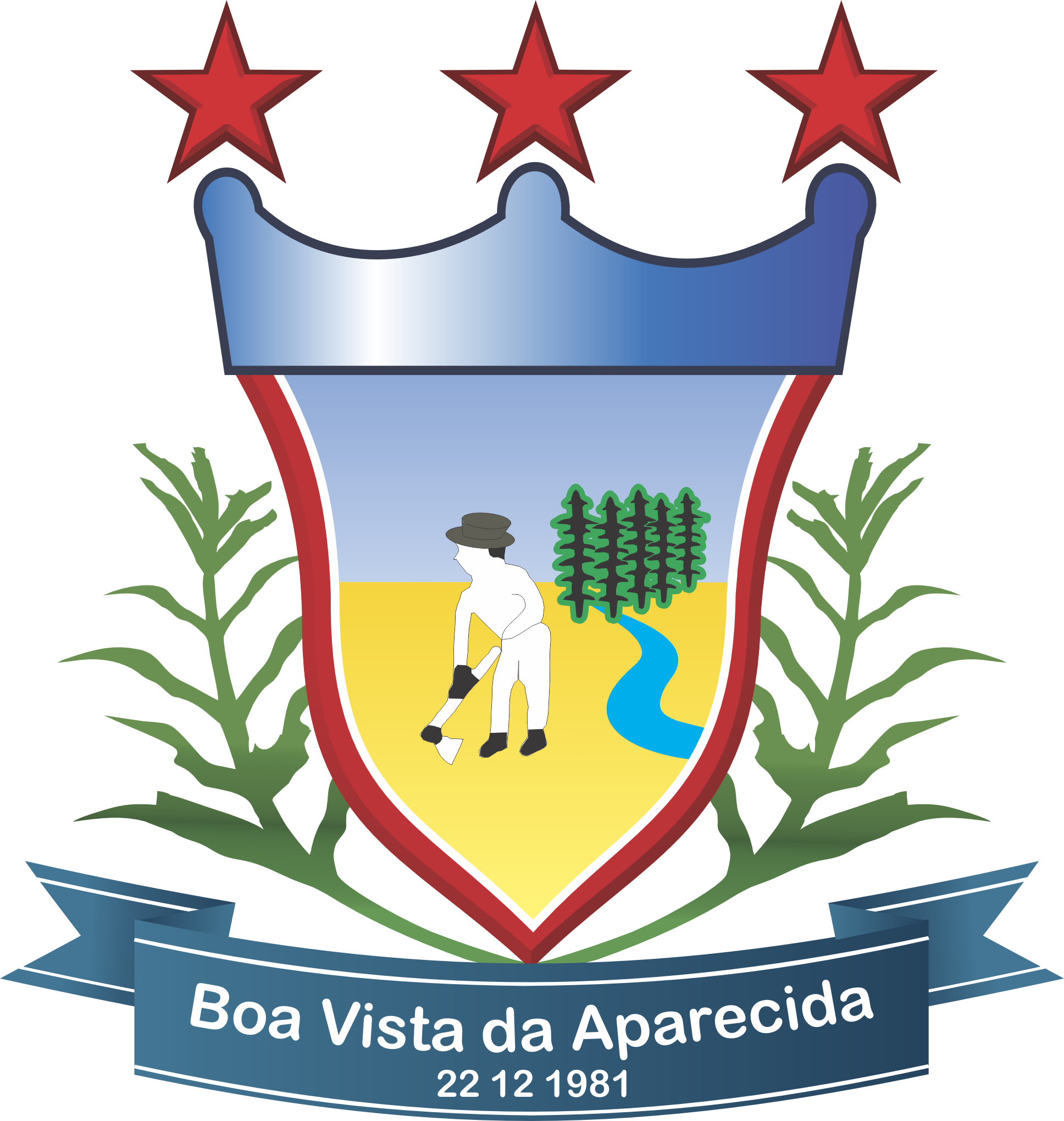
- Flag Coat of arms
- Interactive map of Boa Vista da Aparecida
- Country: Brazil
- Region: Southern
- State: Paraná
- Mesoregion: Oeste Paranaense

Population (2020)
  - Total: 7,540
- Time zone: UTC−3 (BRT)

Boa Vista da Aparecida is a municipality in the state of Paraná in the Southern Region of Brazil.

== See also ==
- List of municipalities in Paraná
