= Buena Vista (Leonardtown, Maryland) =

Historic house in Maryland, United States

- U.S. National Register of Historic Places
- Location within Maryland Location within the United States
- Location: MD 5, W of jct. of MD 245 and MD 379, Leonardtown, Maryland
- Coordinates: 38°17′52″N 76°38′12″W
- Built: 1840
- Architect: Camalier, Vincent
- Architectural style: Federal, Greek Revival
- NRHP reference No.: 98000997
- Added to NRHP: August 19, 1998

Buena Vista, or Bard's Field on Trinity Manor, is a historic home located at Leonardtown, St. Mary's County, Maryland, United States. It is a 2 1/2-story, three-bay, Greek Revival-style frame dwelling with a 2-story, three-bay, frame, wing. It was built between 1840 and 1850, for George and Mary C. Combs.

Buena Vista was listed on the National Register of Historic Places in 1998.
