= Boa Vista do Buricá =

Municipality of Rio Grande do Sul, Brazil

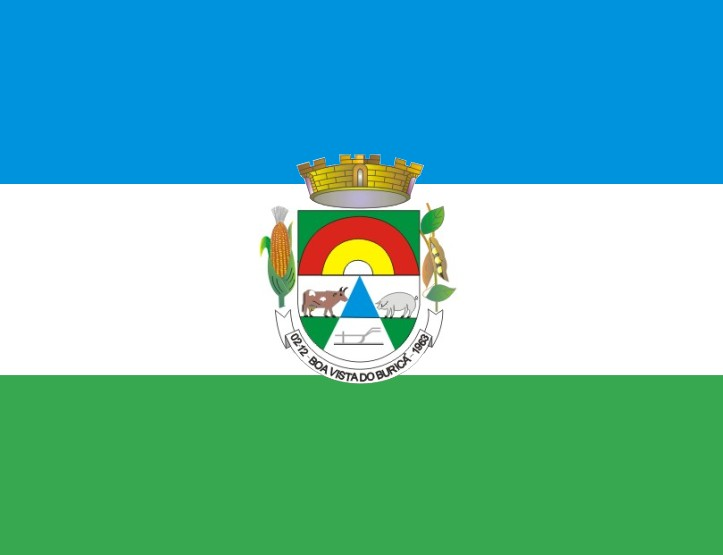
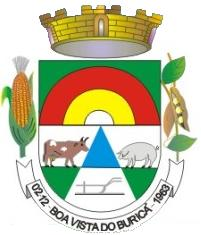
- Flag Coat of arms
- Nickname: "Enterprising Land" (Terra de Empreendedores)
- Coordinates: 27°40′07″S 54°06′36″W
- Country: Brazil
- Region: South
- State: Rio Grande do Sul
- Founded: 1963

Government
  - Mayor: Jorge Gilberto Klöckner (PTB)

Area
  - Total: 109.557 km^{2} (42.300 sq mi)
- Elevation: 291 m (955 ft)

Population (2020)
  - Total: 6,712
  - Density: 60.44/km^{2} (156.5/sq mi)
- Time zone: UTC−3 (BRT)
- Website: Prefeitura de Boa Vista do Buricá

Boa Vista do Buricá is a municipality in the state of Rio Grande do Sul, Brazil, located at 27°40′07″S 54°06′36″W, at an altitude of 291 meters above sea level. It has an area of 108,732 kilometers^{2}. The population was estimated at 6,712 in 2020. It has a predominantly agricultural economy, but there is also an industrial park for small and medium enterprises in different sectors. Its population consists mainly of the descendants European of immigrants, the vast majority of Germanic origin. German is frequently used.

== See also ==
- List of municipalities in Rio Grande do Sul
