= Natias Neutert =

German artist, author, poet, orator and translator (born 1941)

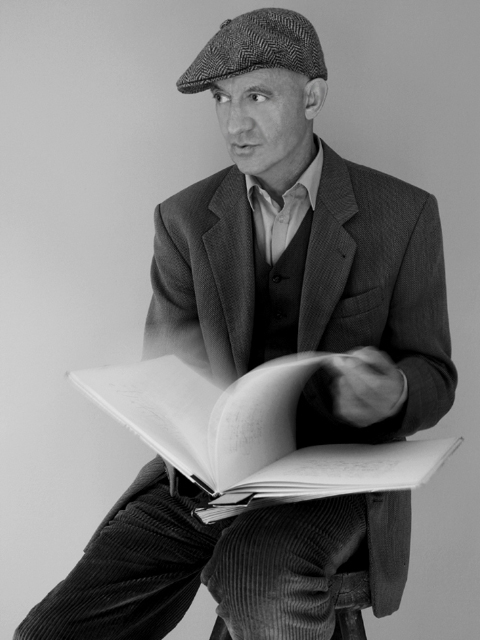
Natias Neutert, portrait by Nic Frechen

Natias Neutert (spoken: "noytərt"; born 24 February 1941) is a German artist, author, poet, orator, and translator who lives in Hamburg and Berlin.

== Life and career ==
Neutert was born in Neusalz, Province of Lower Silesia, Germany (Nowa Sól, Poland) and grew up in Hamburg-Eppendorf, attending the Rudolf Steiner School. After completing an apprenticeship as a graphic illustrator, he studied philosophy, literary studies, and art history at the University of Hamburg, and completed a fellowship at the Franz Mehring-institute, part of the University of Leipzig. From the outset of his career, he has been active in different media.

Since the mid-1960s he has written poems, and made collages and drawings about which the Hamburger Abendblatt wrote: "He delicately draws human figures" (and) "he has his own distinctive verve and expressiveness". Inspired by America's new journalism, he has also written articles for different newspapers, including Die Zeit, Frankfurter Rundschau, Stern, and essays for Süddeutsche Zeitung and Norddeutscher Rundfunk.

In 1965, he screened his short film Noch und Nöcher (with Iris Berben) at the Berlinale. But his actual artist's departure was in 1968. Instead of a normal academic final degree, he founded the first Internationale Walter Benjamin Gesellschaft in Hamburg. Its purpose: to promote Benjamin into a global prototype of theory of revolutionary change beside Marx, and to connect Benjamin's insights with the mass phenomenon of pop music. From his first docentship at the Hamburg University of Applied Sciences in 1971, through his 2014 book Wo sind wir, wenn wir im Bilde sind? (Where Are We When We Are In The Picture?) he has always been concerned with the freedom, power, and variety of imagination.

Between the 1970s and 1980s almost every child knew him as "Zaubertramp" because of his conjuring performances all over the country, his appearances in TV shows like Sesamstrasse and others, and because his children's book, which he illustrated himself, became a bestseller. He also developed a performance art, about which Die Zeit No. 32, 04. August 1978 wrote: "In his person are blended jugglery, poetry, standup theater, and self-expression into a kind of entertainment that is really based on a colloquy with the audience". As a solo artist who presented almost two-hour performances at thousands of cabarets, street and folk festivals, he also appeared at the top theatres, opera houses, and art museums in Germany, which earned him the nickname "Totalkünstler" (total artist).

Since the turn of the 21st century, he has concentrated more and more on freely spoken lectures which include distinctive performance art elements.

== Performances and expositions ==
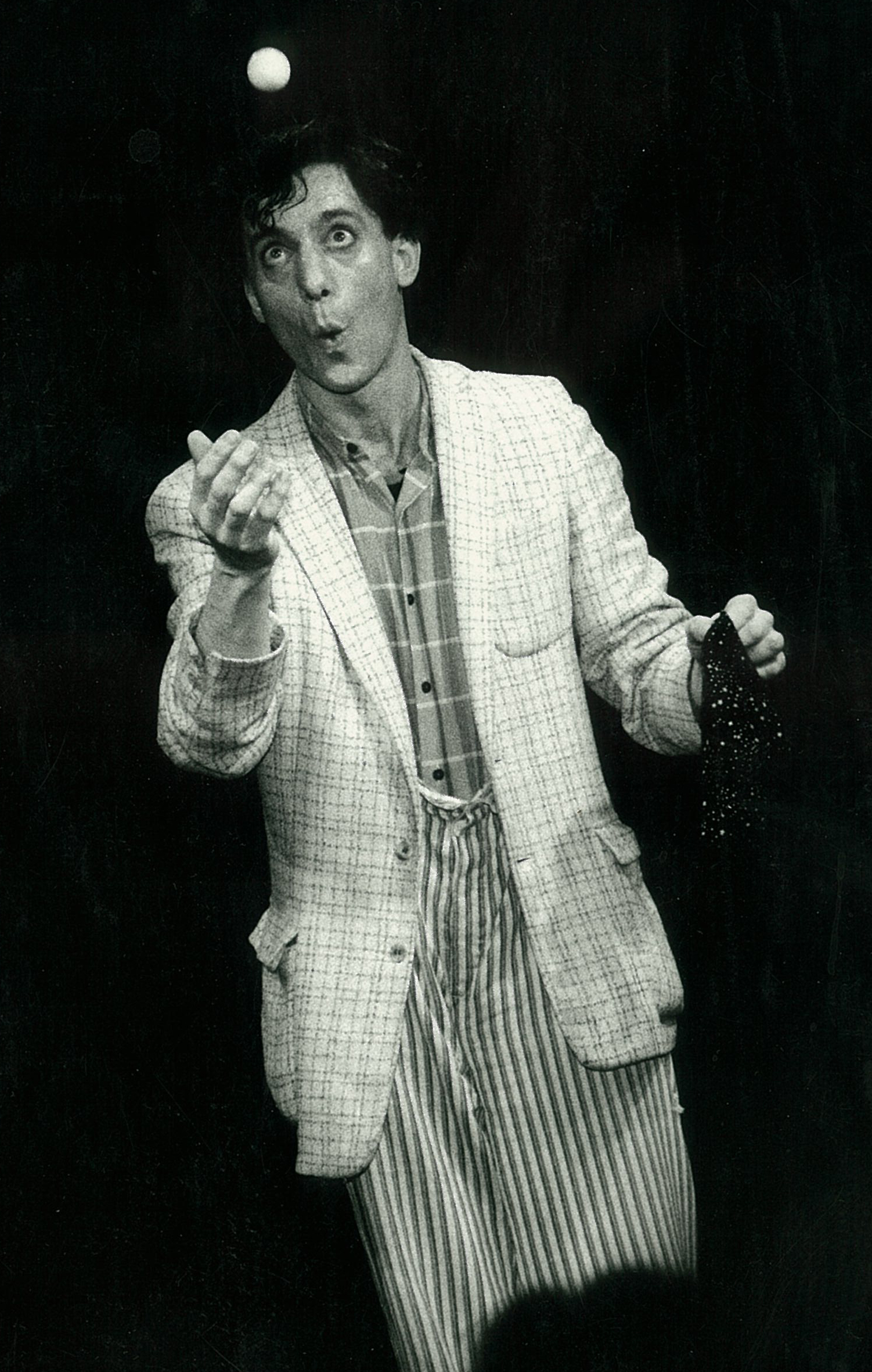
One-Mensch-Theater Natias Neutert at Arena, Vienna 1982

=== Group shows (selection) ===
- 1986 Diogenes Synopse — ein paar Radischen at Künstlerhaus Bethanien Berlin, 5 August 1986.
- 1987 Wenn Elefanten sich treffen, kommt einiges Gewicht zusammen, with En Esch, Jacques Sehy and Udo Sturm at Staatsoper Hamburg, 1987.
- 1988 Graphik, Collagen, Multiples, Galerie Kammer, Hamburg

=== Solo shows (selection) ===
- 1988 Arbeiten auf Papier, Kunst Büro Berlin 1988.
- 1988 Sympathy for Piano und Pump, Martin-Gropius-Bau Berlin 1988
- 2002: Phantombild des Paradoxen (Composite Sketch of Paradoxy), performance lecture in celebration of the 450-anniversary of the Philipps-Universität Marburg 2002.
- 2008: Guest Poet on Ringelnatz-Sommer, Kulturhistorisches Museum, Wurzen
- 2015: Rilke — Reise, Rausch und Rose, Rilke-Soiré, 14. 03. 2015 Cité Internationale Universitaire de Paris, Maison Heinrich Heine, Paris.
- 2017: Sich die Freiheit nehmen. Über die Bilderfinderin Hannah Höch (Taking Freedom. About the Image-inventress Hannah Höch), lecture-performance at Galerie St. Gertrude, Hamburg 2017.

== Translating ==
In the '70s, Neutert began translations from English into German, and since living in New York in 1980, he has also translated works from German into English,

At the 2013 Leipzig Book Fair, during a public reading at "Leipzig liest" Neutert provided insights into his private passion project—translating Gottfried Benn’s poetry. He hopes to adequately to preserve Benn's linguistic innovations as well as his poetic sound.

== Publications ==
=== Anthologies ===
- 1999: Dompteur des flüchtigen Augenblicks, in: Martin Pudenz: Selbst. Umschau/Braus Verlag, Heidelberg 1999. ISBN 978-3-8295-6816-6
- 2000: Shigeru Ban. Ein sanfter Revolutionär (A Soft Revolutionary), in: Shigeru Ban Architects/Paper Tube Architecture — 10 Works 1990-2000. Galerie Kammer, Architektur und Kunst, Junius Verlag, Hamburg 2000. ISBN 978-3-88506-299-8.
- 2004: Das Abwesende, das stets anwesend ist. Die Beunruhigungsfigur des Denkens, in: Ruhm, Tod und Unsterblichkeit. Über den Umgang mit der Endlichkeit. Hrsg. von Konrad Paul Lissmann, Philosophicum Lech, Bd.7, Paul Zsolnay Verlag Wien, 2004, ISBN 978-3-552-05299-4.
- 2006: Aus der Stille. Eine Antwort auf Friedrich Hölderlin (From the silence. A response to Friedrich Hölderlin), in: Vom Wesentlichen zur Substanz, Bad Driburg, 2006.
- 2014 Fahrradspaß. Geschichten und Gedichte. Selected by Alexander Kluy. Reclam Verlag Stuttgart 2014, ISBN 978-3-15-010976-2.

=== Editing ===
- 1968: "Nathias-Neutert-Magazin", Nr. 1, 18. Oktober 1968, Cicero Presse, Hamburg.
- 1971: Spielen, Vorwort Bazon Brock, Kunstverein Hamburg 1971.
- 1980: Natias Neutert: Foolnotes, Very Best German Poems. Bilingual Edition, Smith Gallery, Soho New York 1980.
- 1989: Der fremde Blick, Kunst mit Fotografie. Faksimile-Mappe mit 12 einliegenden Blättern von Joseph Beuys, Rolf Dieter Brinkmann, Jürgen Klauke, Yves Klein, Urs Lüthi, Sigmar Polke et al. Edition Boa Vista, Hamburg 1989.

=== Monographies ===
- 1971: Nathias Neutert: Bausteine für eine polyästhetische Erziehung (Building Blocks for a Polyesthetic Education). Fachhochschule für Gestaltung, Hamburg 1971.
- Nathias Neutert: »Adorno ist tot. Der von uns verschiedene Philosoph". Pozzo Press, Hamburg 1971.
- 1976: Nathias Neutert: 100 Tricks und Zaubereien, 1st edition in 1976, 10th edition in 1993. Rowohlt Verlag, Reinbek bei Hamburg, ISBN 978-3-499-20119-6.
- 1977: Nathias Neutert: Was ist und was sein soll, Edition Pozzo Press, Karlsruhe 1977.
- 1982: Natias Neutert: You Can Make Magic, Angus & Robertson, London/Canberra 1982. ISBN 978-0-207-14843-9.
- 2014: Natias Neutert: Wo sind wir, wenn wir im Bilde sind? Über Differenziale der Einbildungskraft. Lilienstaub & Schmidt, Berlin 2014, ISBN 978-3-945003-98-5.

== Bibliography (selection) ==
- Christa Sobe: Ein zaubernder Literat (A Conjuring Littérateur) in: Hannoversche Allgemeine Zeitung, Feuilleton, 9 May 1978.
- Michael Buselmeier: Klaun (Fool) in: Theater heute, vol 6, Juni 1981, p. 68.
- Elisabeth Rumpf: Das Ein-Mensch-Theater (The One-Mensch-Theater), in: Zur Person Die Welt Nr. 55, 6 March 1981.
- Manfred Sack: Musikalische Performance. Piano und Pumpe in: Die Zeit no 40, 30 September 1988.

== See also ==
- Boa Vista (literary magazine)
- Pop journalism
- Sympathy (music)
