= MV Bonavista =

A number of vessels have been named Bonavista, including:

- MV Bonavista (1956), a cargo liner built for the Canadian National Railway
- MV Bonavista (1973), a ferry in service 1999–2001
