= Boa Vista (literary magazine) =

German literary magazine

Boa Vista [boɐ ѵɪʃʈɐ] (Portuguese for beautiful view ) was a German literary magazine, founded in Hamburg in 1974 and published until 1983.

The magazine came out at irregular intervals and produced ten issues.

== Approach and authors ==
With recourse to Dada, surrealism and the narrative forms of Beat – and Cut-up literature, Boa Vista entirely focused on experimental poetry and prose. Its regular or temporary employees included the following writers and artists :

- Helmut Heissenbüttel
- Natias Neutert
- Peter Rühmkorf
- Helmut Salzinger
- Klaus Thiele–Dohrmann
