= Buena Vista Social Club (disambiguation) =

Buena Vista Social Club was a Cuban music revival group founded in 1996.

Buena Vista Social Club may also refer to:

- Buenavista Social Club, 1940s member's club in Havana
- Buena Vista Social Club (album), a 1997 album by the group
- Buena Vista Social Club (film), a 1999 documentary film about the group
- Buena Vista Social Club: Adios, a 2017 documentary film about the group
- "Buenavista Social Club" (composition), a danzón by Israel López "Cachao"
- Buena Vista Social Club (musical), a 2023 stage musical
