= Buena Vista, Hocking County, Ohio =

Unincorporated community in Ohio, U.S.

- Unincorporated community
- Interactive map of Buena Vista, Hocking County, Ohio
- Coordinates: 39°33′00″N 82°40′15″W
- Country: United States
- State: Ohio
- County: Hocking
- Laid out: 1848

Buena Vista is an unincorporated community in Hocking County, in the U.S. state of Ohio.

== History ==
Buena Vista was laid out in 1848. An old variant name of Buena Vista was Middle Fork. A post office called Middle Fork was established in 1852, and remained in operation until 1907.
