= Buena Vista, Tennessee =

- Unincorporated community
- Location within Tennessee Location within the United States
- Coordinates: 35°58′35″N 88°17′22″W
- Country: United States
- State: Tennessee
- County: Carroll
- Elevation: 509 ft (155 m)
- Time zone: UTC-6 (Central (CST))
  - Summer (DST): UTC-5 (CDT)
- ZIP code: 38318
- Area code: 731
- GNIS feature ID: 1305502

Buena Vista is an unincorporated community in Carroll County, Tennessee, United States. The zipcode is: 38318.
