= Boa Vista das Missões =

Municipality in Rio Grande do Sul, Brazil

Coordinates: 27°39′46″S 53°18′50″W

- Municipality
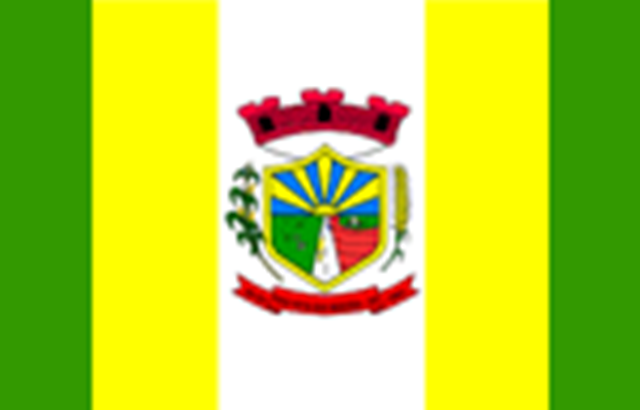
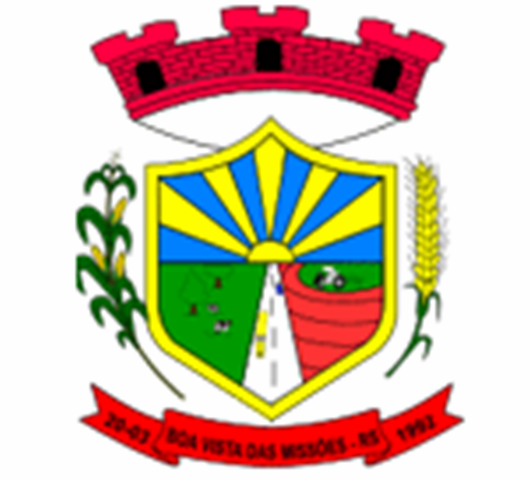
- Flag Coat of arms
- Interactive map of Boa Vista das Missões
- Country: Brazil
- Time zone: UTC−3 (BRT)

Boa Vista das Missões is a municipality in the state of Rio Grande do Sul, Brazil. As of 2020, the estimated population was 2,092.

== See also ==
- List of municipalities in Rio Grande do Sul
