= Buena Vista, Scioto County, Ohio =

Unincorporated community in Ohio, U.S.

Coordinates: 38°37′48″N 83°15′41″W

Buena Vista is an unincorporated community in Scioto County, in the U.S. state of Ohio.

== History ==
Buena Vista was platted in 1850. The community was named in commemoration of the Battle of Buena Vista (1847) in the Mexican–American War. A post office called Buena Vista was established in 1883, and remained in operation until 1960.
