= Buena Vista Township, Schuyler County, Illinois =

Coordinates: 40°08′22″N 90°37′08″W

Buena Vista Township
- Township
- Location in Schuyler County

- Schuyler County's location in Illinois
- Country: United States
- State: Illinois
- County: Schuyler
- Established: November 8, 1853

Area
  - Total: 36.46 sq mi (94.4 km^{2})
  - Land: 36.45 sq mi (94.4 km^{2})
  - Water: 0.01 sq mi (0.026 km^{2}) 0.03%

Population (2010)
  - Estimate (2016): 1,723
  - Density: 50.7/sq mi (19.6/km^{2})
- Time zone: UTC-6 (CST)
  - Summer (DST): UTC-5 (CDT)
- FIPS code: 17-169-09395

Buena Vista Township is located in Schuyler County, Illinois. As of the 2010 census, its population was 1,849 and it contained 667 housing units.

== Geography ==
According to the 2010 census, the township has a total area of 36.46 square miles (94.4 km^{2}), of which 36.45 square miles (94.4 km^{2}) (or 99.97%) is land and 0.01 square miles (0.026 km^{2}) (or 0.03%) is water.

== Demographics ==
Historical population
Census	Pop.	Note	%±
2016 (est.)	1,723
U.S. Decennial Census
