= List of places in California (B) =

List of places in California - B

This list of current:

- cities
- towns, unincorporated communities
- counties, and other recognized places in the U.S. state of California.

Information on the number and names of counties in which the place lies, and its lower and upper ZIP Code bounds, if applicable are also included.

Name of place	Number of counties	Principal county	Lower zip code	Upper zip code
Baden	1	San Mateo County	94080	
Badger	1	Tulare County	93603	
Badwater	1	Inyo County		
Bagby	1	Mariposa County	95311	
Bagdad	1	San Bernardino County	92304	
Bahia	1	Solano County		
Bailey	1	Los Angeles County	90601	
Bailhache	1	Sonoma County		
Baker	1	San Bernardino County	92309	
Bakersfield	1	Kern County	93301	89
Bakersfield Corrals	1	Kern County		
Balance Rock	1	Tulare County	93260	
Balboa	1	Orange County	92661	
Balboa Bay Shores	1	Orange County		
Balboa Island	1	Orange County	92662	
Balch	1	San Bernardino County		
Balch Camp	1	Fresno County	93649	
Balderson Station	1	El Dorado County		
Baldwin Hills	1	Los Angeles County	90056	
Baldwin Lake	1	San Bernardino County	92314	
Baldwin Park	1	Los Angeles County	91706	
Baldy Mesa	1	San Bernardino County	92392	
Ballarat	1	Inyo County	93562	
Ballard	1	Santa Barbara County	93463	
Ballico	1	Merced County	95303	
Ballou	1	San Bernardino County		
Ballroad	1	Orange County	90630	
Balls Ferry	1	Shasta County	96007	
Baltimore Park	1	Marin County	94939	
Baltimore Town	1	Nevada County		
Bancroft	1	Contra Costa County		
Bancroft Point	1	San Diego County		
Bandini	1	Los Angeles County	90022	
Bangor	1	Butte County	95914	
Bankhead Springs	1	San Diego County	92034	
Banner	1	San Diego County		
Banning	1	Riverside County	92220	
Bannock	1	San Bernardino County		
Banta	1	San Joaquin County	95304	
Barbara Terrace	1	San Diego County		
Barber	1	Butte County		
Barber City	1	Orange County	92683	
Bard	1	Imperial County	92222	
Bardi	1	San Joaquin County		
Bardsdale	1	Ventura County	93015	
Barkerville	1	Lake County		
Barlow	1	Sonoma County		
Barnwell	1	San Bernardino County		
Baroda	1	Santa Barbara County		
Barona	1	San Diego County		
Barona Rancheria	1	San Diego County	92040	
Barrett	1	Mariposa County		
Barrett	1	San Diego County	92017	
Barrett Junction	1	San Diego County		
Barrington	1	Los Angeles County	90049	
Barro	1	Napa County		
Barron Park	1	Santa Clara County	94306	
Barstow	1	Fresno County		
Barstow	1	San Bernardino County	92311	12
Barstow Colony	1	Fresno County	93705	
Barsug	1	Santa Barbara County		
Bartlett Springs	1	Lake County		
Bartolo	1	Los Angeles County		
Barton	1	Fresno County	93702	
Bartonette	1	Fresno County		
Base Line	1	San Bernardino County	92410	
Basin	1	San Bernardino County		
Bassett	1	Los Angeles County	91746	
Bassetts	1	Sierra County	96125	
Bass Lake	1	Madera County	93604	
Batavia	1	Solano County	95620	
Baths	1	Sacramento County		
Battles	1	Santa Barbara County		
Batto	1	Sonoma County		
Baxter	1	Placer County	95704	
Bay	1	San Bernardino County	92315	
Bay-Fair	1	Alameda County		
Bay Farm Island	1	Alameda County	94501	
Bayley	1	Modoc County		
Bayliss	1	Glenn County	95943	
Bayo Vista	1	Contra Costa County	94572	
Bay Park	1	San Diego County		
Bay Point	1	Contra Costa County	94565	
Bayshore	1	Alameda County		
Bayshore	1	San Mateo County	94005	
Bayside	1	Humboldt County	95524	
Bayview	1	Humboldt County	95501	
Bay View	1	San Francisco County	94124	
Bayview District	1	San Francisco County		
Bayview-Montalvin	1	Contra Costa County		
Bayview Park	1	Contra Costa County	94806	
Bay View Park	1	Monterey County	93941	
Baywood	1	San Mateo County		
Baywood-Los Osos	1	San Luis Obispo County		
Baywood Park	1	San Luis Obispo County	93402	
Beach Center	1	Orange County	92648	
Beale Air Force Base	2	Nevada County; Yuba County	95903	
Beale East	1	Yuba County	95903	
Beale West	1	Yuba County	95903	
Bealville	1	Kern County		
Bear Creek	1	Merced County	95340	
Bear Creek	1	San Joaquin County		
Bear Mountain	1	Siskiyou County		
Bear River	1	Nevada County	95603	
Bear River Lake	1	Amador County	95666	
Bear River Pines	1	Nevada County	95945	
Bear Valley	1	Alpine County	95223	
Bear Valley	1	Mariposa County	95338	
Bear Valley Springs	1	Kern County	93561	
Beatrice	1	Humboldt County		
Beatrice	1	Yolo County		
Beaumont	1	Riverside County	92223	
Beckwourth	1	Plumas County	96129	
Beechers Corners	1	San Bernardino County		
Beegum	1	Tehama County		
Bee Rock	1	San Luis Obispo County	93426	
Bel Air	1	Los Angeles County	90077	
Bel Aire Estates	1	Marin County	94920	
Belden	1	Plumas County	95915	
Belfast	1	Lassen County		
Belfort	1	Mono County		
Bell	1	Los Angeles County	90201	
Bellaire	1	Contra Costa County	94565	
Bella Vista	1	Contra Costa County	94565	
Bella Vista	1	Los Angeles County	90022	
Bella Vista	1	Shasta County	96008	
Bella Vista	1	Tulare County		
Bell Canyon	1	Los Angeles County	91307	
Belle Haven	1	San Mateo County	94025	
Belle Monte	1	San Mateo County		
Belleview	1	Humboldt County		
Belleview	1	Tuolumne County	95370	
Bellflower	1	Los Angeles County	90706	
Bell Gardens	1	Los Angeles County	90201	
Bell Mountain	1	San Bernardino County	92392	
Bellota	1	San Joaquin County	95236	
Bell Springs	1	Mendocino County		
Bells Station	1	Santa Clara County	95023	
Belltown	1	Riverside County	92509	
Bellview	1	Humboldt County	95562	
Bel Marin Keys	1	Marin County	94949	
Belmont	1	San Mateo County	94002	
Belmont Avenue	1	Fresno County		
Belmont Shore	1	Los Angeles County		
Belvedere	1	Los Angeles County	90022	
Belvedere	1	Marin County	94920	
Belvedere Gardens	1	Los Angeles County	90022	
Belvedere Heights	1	Riverside County		
Belvedere-Tiburon	1	Marin County	94920	
Belvernon Gardens	1	Marin County	94920	
Bena	1	Kern County		
Ben Ali	1	Sacramento County		
Benbow	1	Humboldt County	95440	
Bend	1	Tehama County	96080	
Ben Hur	1	Mariposa County		
Benicia	1	Solano County	94510	
Benicia Arsenal	1	Solano County	94510	
Benito	1	Fresno County		
Ben Lomond	1	Santa Cruz County	95005	
Benton	1	Mono County	93512	
Benton Hot Springs	1	Mono County		
Benton Paiute Indian Reservation	1	Mono County	93514	
Benton Station	1	Mono County		
Berenda	1	Madera County	93637	
Berg	1	Sutter County		
Berkeley	1	Alameda County	94701	10
Berkeley Highlands	1	Contra Costa County	94707	
Bermuda Dunes	1	Riverside County	92201	
Bernal	1	San Francisco County	94110	
Berros	1	San Luis Obispo County		
Berry Creek	1	Butte County	95916	
Berry Creek Rancheria	1	Butte County	95916	
Berryessa	1	Santa Clara County	95132	
Berryessa Park	1	Napa County	94559	
Berry Glenn	1	Humboldt County		
Berry Hill Estates	1	Los Angeles County	90274	
Bertsch-Oceanview	1	Del Norte County		
Bertsch Terrace	1	Del Norte County	95531	
Bestville	1	Siskiyou County		
Beswick	1	Siskiyou County		
Bethany	1	San Joaquin County	95376	
Bethel	1	Los Angeles County		
Bethel Island	1	Contra Costa County	94511	
Bethel Tract	1	Fresno County	93648	
Betteravia	1	Santa Barbara County	93455	
Betteravia Junction	1	Santa Barbara County		
Betteravia Stockyards	1	Santa Barbara County		
Beulah Park	1	Santa Cruz County	95062	
Beulah Picnic Ground	1	San Diego County		
Beverly Glen	1	Los Angeles County		
Beverly Hills	1	Los Angeles County	90210	13
Bicentennial	1	Los Angeles County	90048	
Bicknell	1	Santa Barbara County		
Bieber	1	Lassen County	96009	
Big Bar	1	Trinity County	96010	
Big Basin	1	Santa Cruz County	95006	
Big Bear Lake	1	San Bernardino County	92315	
Big Bear City	1	San Bernardino County	92314	
Big Bear Highlands	1	San Bernardino County	92386	
Big Bear Lake	1	San Bernardino County	92315	
Big Bear Pines	1	San Bernardino County	92386	
Big Bear Pinewoods	1	San Bernardino County	92386	
Big Bend	1	Butte County		
Big Bend	1	Placer County		
Big Bend	1	Shasta County	96011	
Big Bend	1	Sonoma County		
Big Bend Rancheria	1	Shasta County	96011	
Big Bunch	1	Fresno County		
Big Chief	1	Placer County	95734	
Big Creek	1	Fresno County	93605	
Bigelow	1	Inyo County		
Big Flat	1	Siskiyou County	96091	
Biggs	1	Butte County	95917	
Big Lagoon	1	Humboldt County		
Big Lagoon Park	1	Humboldt County	95570	
Big Lagoon Rancheria	1	Humboldt County	95555	
Big Meadow	1	Calaveras County	95223	
Big Oak Flat	1	Tuolumne County	95305	
Big Pine	1	Inyo County	93513	
Big Pine Rancheria	1	Inyo County	95804	
Big Pines	1	Los Angeles County		
Big River	1	San Bernardino County	92242	
Big Rock Springs	1	Los Angeles County		
Big Sandy Rancheria	1	Fresno County		
Big Springs	1	Siskiyou County	96064	
Big Sur	1	Monterey County	93920	
Big Trees	1	Calaveras County		
Big Trees	1	Santa Cruz County	95018	
Big Valley Rancheria	1	Lake County		
Bijou	1	El Dorado County	96156	
Bijou Park	1	El Dorado County	95705	
Binghamton	1	Solano County	95620	
Biola	1	Fresno County	93606	
Biola Junction	1	Fresno County		
Birch Hill	1	San Diego County	92060	
Birchville	1	Nevada County		
Bird Rock	1	San Diego County		
Birds Landing	1	Solano County	94512	
Bishop	1	Inyo County	93514	
Bishop Acres	1	Kern County	93263	
Bishop Creek	1	Inyo County	93514	
Bishop Rancheria	1	Inyo County	95825	
Biskra Palms	1	Riverside County		
Bismarck	1	San Bernardino County		
Bitney Corner	1	Nevada County		
Bitterwater	1	San Benito County	93930	
Bixby	1	Los Angeles County	90807	
Bixby Knolls	1	Los Angeles County		
Black Butte	1	Siskiyou County		
Blackhawk	1	Contra Costa County	94506	
Blackhawk-Camino Tassajara	1	Contra Costa County		
Black Lands	1	San Joaquin County		
Black Meadow Landing	1	San Bernardino County	92267	
Black Oak	1	Tuolumne County		
Black Oaks	1	Sonoma County		
Black Point-Green Point	1	Marin County		
Blackstone	1	Fresno County	93710	
Blairsden	1	Plumas County	96103	
Blanchard	1	Mariposa County		
Blanco	1	Monterey County		
Blanco	1	Tulare County		
Blocksburg	1	Humboldt County	95514	
Bloomfield	1	Sonoma County	94952	
Bloomfield Acres	1	Humboldt County	95521	
Bloomington	1	San Bernardino County	92316	
Blossom Hill	1	Santa Clara County	95123	
Blossom Valley	1	Santa Clara County	94040	
Blue Anchor	1	Sutter County		
Blue Canyon	1	Placer County	95715	
Blue Hills	1	Santa Clara County	95070	
Blue Jay	1	San Bernardino County	92317	
Blue Lake	1	Humboldt County	95525	
Blue Lake Rancheria	1	Humboldt County		
Bluewater	1	San Bernardino County		
Bluff Creek	1	Humboldt County	95546	
Bly	1	Riverside County	92509	
Blythe	1	Riverside County	92225	
Boal	1	San Diego County		
Boca	1	Nevada County	96161	
Bodega	1	Sonoma County	94922	
Bodega Bay	1	Sonoma County	94923	
Bodfish	1	Kern County	93205	
Bodie	1	Mono County		
Bogue	1	Sutter County		
Boiling Point	1	Los Angeles County		
Bolam	1	Siskiyou County		
Boles	1	Modoc County		
Bolinas	1	Marin County	94924	
Bolsa	1	Orange County	92683	
Bolsa Knolls	1	Monterey County	93901	
Bombay	1	Sacramento County		
Bombay Beach	1	Imperial County	92257	
Bonadelle Ranchos-Madera Ranchos	1	Madera County		
Bonanza Springs	1	Lake County		
Bonds Corner	1	Imperial County	92250	
Bonetti	1	El Dorado County		
Bonilla	1	Sonoma County		
Bonita	1	Madera County		
Bonita	1	San Diego County	91902	
Bonnefoy	1	Amador County		
Bonner	1	Los Angeles County		
Bonnie Bell	1	Riverside County	92282	
Bonnie Doon	1	Santa Cruz County		
Bonnie View	1	Colusa County		
Bonny Doon	1	Santa Cruz County	95060	
Bonnyview	1	Shasta County	96001	
Bonsall	1	San Diego County	92003	
Boonville	1	Mendocino County	95415	
Bootjack	1	Mariposa County		
Borden	1	Madera County		
Border City	1	Los Angeles County	93544	
Boron	1	Kern County	93516	
Boronda	1	Monterey County		
Borosolvay	1	San Bernardino County	93562	
Borrego	1	San Diego County		
Borrego Springs	1	San Diego County	92004	
Borrego Wells	1	San Diego County	92004	
Bostonia	1	San Diego County	92021	
Boston Ravine	1	Nevada County	95945	
Boulder Bay	1	San Bernardino County		
Boulder Creek	1	Santa Cruz County	95006	
Boulder Oaks	1	San Diego County	92062	
Boulder Park	1	Imperial County	92034	
Boulevard	1	San Diego County	91905	
Boulevard Gardens	1	Orange County		
Bouquet Canyon	1	Los Angeles County	91350	
Bouquet Junction	1	Los Angeles County		
Bowles	1	Fresno County		
Bowling Green	1	Sacramento County	95815	
Bowman	1	Placer County	95604	
Bowman-Auburn North	1	Placer County	95603	
Box Canyon	1	Los Angeles County	91304	
Box Springs	1	Riverside County	92507	
Boyd	1	Sacramento County		
Boyd	1	San Joaquin County		
Boyes Hot Springs	1	Sonoma County	95416	
Boyle	1	Los Angeles County	90033	
Boyle Heights	1	Los Angeles County	90033	
Boys Republic	1	San Bernardino County	91710	
Brackney	1	Santa Cruz County	95005	
Bracut	1	Humboldt County		
Bradbury	1	Los Angeles County	91010	
Bradford	1	Alameda County	94541	
Bradley	1	Monterey County	93426	
Bragur	1	Santa Barbara County		
Brainard	1	Humboldt County		
Brandeis	1	Ventura County	93064	
Brandy City	1	Sierra County		
Brandywine	1	San Joaquin County		
Branscomb	1	Mendocino County	95417	
Brant	1	San Bernardino County		
Brawley	1	Imperial County	92227	
Bray	1	Siskiyou County	96066	
Brazos	1	Napa County		
Brea	1	Orange County	92821	23
Brea Chem	1	Orange County		
Brents Junction	1	Los Angeles County		
Brentwood	1	Contra Costa County	94513	
Brentwood	1	Los Angeles County	90049	
Brentwood Heights	1	Los Angeles County		
Brentwood Park	1	Los Angeles County		
Bret Harte	1	Stanislaus County		
Bretz Mill	1	Fresno County		
Briceburg	1	Mariposa County		
Briceland	1	Humboldt County	95440	
Bridgehaven	1	Sonoma County		
Bridge House	1	Sacramento County	95683	
Bridgeport	1	Mariposa County	95338	
Bridgeport	1	Mono County	93517	
Bridgeport	1	Nevada County		
Bridgeport Colony	1	Mono County	93517	
Bridgeville	1	Humboldt County	95526	
Briggs	1	Los Angeles County	90048	
Briggs	1	Ventura County		
Briggs Terrace	1	Los Angeles County		
Brighton	1	Sacramento County		
Brisbane	1	San Mateo County	94005	
Bristol	1	Orange County	92703	
Brito	1	Merced County		
Broadmoor	1	San Mateo County	94015	
Broadway	1	Sacramento County	95818	
Broadway	1	San Mateo County	94010	
Broadway Manchester	1	Los Angeles County	90003	
Broadwell	1	San Bernardino County		
Brock	1	Placer County		
Brockman	1	Lassen County		
Brockmans Corner	1	Inyo County		
Brockway	1	Placer County	96143	
Broderick	1	Yolo County	95605	
Broderick-Bryte	1	Yolo County		
Bromela	1	San Luis Obispo County		
Bronco	1	Stanislaus County		
Brookdale	1	Santa Cruz County	95007	
Brooks	1	Yolo County	95606	
Brookside Park	1	San Mateo County	94025	
Brooks Mill	1	Modoc County		
Brown	1	Kern County		
Browning	1	Orange County		
Browns Flat	1	Tuolumne County	95370	
Browns Valley	1	Yuba County	95918	
Brownsville	1	Yuba County	95919	
Bruceville	1	Sacramento County		
Brundage	1	Kern County	93307	
Brush Creek	1	Butte County	95916	
Bryant	1	Los Angeles County	90815	
Brylane	1	San Bernardino County	90102	
Bryman	1	San Bernardino County		
Bryn Mawr	1	San Bernardino County	92318	
Bryson	1	Monterey County	93426	
Bryte	1	Yolo County	95605	
Buchanan	1	Tuolumne County		
Buchli	1	Napa County		
Buckeye	1	El Dorado County		
Buckeye	1	Plumas County		
Buckeye	1	Shasta County	96001	
Buckhorn	1	Ventura County	93015	
Buckingham Park	1	Lake County	95451	
Buck Meadows	1	Mariposa County	95321	
Bucks Bar	1	El Dorado County	95667	
Bucks Lake	1	Plumas County	95971	
Bucks Lodge	1	Plumas County		
Bucksport	1	Humboldt County		
Bucktown	1	Solano County		
Buellton	1	Santa Barbara County	93427	
Buena	1	San Diego County	92083	
Buena Park	1	Orange County	90620	24
Buena Vista	1	Amador County	95640	
Buena Vista	1	Mariposa County		
Buena Vista	1	Santa Clara County		
Buena Vista	1	Sonoma County	95476	
Buena Vista	1	Tehama County		
Buffalo Hill	1	El Dorado County	95634	
Buhach	1	Merced County	95340	
Bull Creek	1	Humboldt County		
Bully Hill	1	Shasta County		
Bumblebee	1	Tuolumne County		
Bummerville	1	Calaveras County	95255	
Bunker	1	Solano County		
Buntingville	1	Lassen County		
Burbank	1	Los Angeles County	91501	26
Burbank	1	Santa Clara County	95128	
Burbank Junction	1	Los Angeles County		
Burbeck	1	Mendocino County		
Burdell	1	Marin County		
Burke	1	Los Angeles County	90660	
Burkett Acres	1	San Joaquin County	95205	
Burkett Gardens	1	San Joaquin County	95205	
Burlingame	1	San Mateo County	94010	
Burlingame Hills	1	San Mateo County	94010	
Burlington	1	Humboldt County		
Burness	1	Fresno County		
Burney	1	Shasta County	96013	
Burnham	1	San Joaquin County		
Burnt Ranch	1	Trinity County	95527	
Burr	1	Tulare County		
Burrel	1	Fresno County	93607	
Burrell	1	Fresno County		
Burrough	1	Fresno County	93667	
Burson	1	Calaveras County	95225	
Burton	1	Tulare County		
Burton Mill	1	Kern County		
Busch	1	Solano County		
Bush	1	San Bernardino County		
Butano Park	1	San Mateo County		
Butte City	1	Glenn County	95920	
Butte Creek	1	Butte County	95926	
Butte Meadows	1	Butte County	95942	
Buttonwillow	1	Kern County	93206	
Byron	1	Contra Costa County	94514	
Bystrom	1	Stanislaus County		
