= Buena Vista, California =

Buena Vista, California may refer to:

- Buena Vista, Amador County, California, a census-designated place
- Buena Vista, former name of Buttonwillow, California, in Kern County
- Buena Vista, Mariposa County, California, a place in California
- Buena Vista, Nevada County, California, a former settlement
- Buena Vista, Santa Clara County, California, an unincorporated community and former census-designated place
- Buena Vista, Sonoma County, California, a place in California
- Buena Vista, Tehama County, California, a place in California

== See also ==
- Buena Vista (disambiguation)
