= Bull Creek =

Bull Creek may refer to:

== Communities ==
In Australia

- Bull Creek, Western Australia, suburb of Perth

In New Zealand

- Glenledi, New Zealand, also known as Bull Creek

In the United States

- Bull Creek, California, community in Humboldt County
- Bull Creek, Florida, community in Osceola County
- Bull Creek, Missouri, village in Taney County
- Waverly, West Virginia, also known as Bull Creek

== Streams ==
In Australia

- Bull Creek (Mitchell River), a tributary of the Mitchell River in Victoria
- Bull Creek (Murrindindi River), a tributary of the Murrindindi River in Victoria
- Bull Creek (New South Wales), a tributary of the Thredbo River in New South Wales

In the United States

- Bull Creek (Humboldt County), a tributary of the Eel River in California
- Bull Creek (Los Angeles County), a tributary of the Los Angeles River in California
- Bull Creek (Georgia), in Evans County
- Bull Creek (Lake Taneycomo), a stream in Missouri
- Bull Creek (New Jersey), a tributary of the Mullica River
- Bull Creek (Animas Creek), in Hidalgo County, New Mexico
- Bull Creek (Ararat River tributary), a stream in Surry County, North Carolina
- Bull Creek (Ohio), near Youngstown
- Bull Creek (Allegheny River), a tributary of the Allegheny River in Pennsylvania
  - Little Bull Creek (Allegheny River), a tributary of the above
- Bull Creek (Pennington County, South Dakota)
- Bull Creek (Texas), a tributary of the Colorado River

== Other ==
- Bull Creek railway station, Perth, Western Australia
- Goodnight, Bull Creek!, a 2009 album by Australian musician Bob Evans
