= Belvedere Heights, California =

Belvedere Heights, California may refer to:

- Belvedere Heights, Riverside, California, a former unincorporated community, now part of the City of Riverside
- Belvedere Heights, an early 20th-century subdivision near Indiana and First streets in what is now East Los Angeles, California
- Belvedere Heights, an early 20th-century subdivision near W. 21st St. and Western Av. in the Jefferson Park and Adams-Normandie neighborhoods of the City of Los Angeles
- A fictitious Chicano neighborhood of Los Angeles in Penny Dreadful: City of Angels
