= Wingo, California =

- Ghost town
- Location in California
- Coordinates: 38°12′33″N 122°25′36″W
- Country: United States
- State: California
- County: Sonoma
- Elevation: 6.6 ft (2 m)
- Time zone: UTC-8 (Pacific (PST))
  - Summer (DST): UTC-7 (PDT)
- Area code: 707

Wingo is a ghost town located in Sonoma County, California in the United States. It can be found on older maps as a dot along the sloughs of Sonoma Creek, south of Sonoma and Schellville, and west of Buchli.

== History ==
Wingo was a steamship station known as Norfolk until 1879 when it was given the name Wingo by the Railroad. Now a ghost town of a few barns, cabins, and a train trestle, it was once a bustling town that served as a stop for steamer passengers from San Francisco.

Wingo and its surrounding area of 738 acres (299 ha) was included in the Napa-Sonoma Marshes Wildlife Area overseen by the California Department of Fish and Wildlife.

The Northwestern Pacific right of way runs through the town. Just before it enters Wingo, it crosses a manual, chain-operated drawbridge that is planked for both cars and trains to cross.

== Land use ==
Formerly open to tidal action, the area was diked to create agricultural lands. During winter rains natural seasonal ponds are created. Since this area is on a major migration route for many species of birds, efforts are being made to create more seasonal and permanent freshwater ponds and to plant crops and grasses for wildlife.

== Wildlife ==
Wildlife that can be seen in and around Wingo include Golden eagles, American kestrels, Red-tailed hawks, Northern harriers, Owls, California quail, ring-necked pheasant, Bitterns, Turkey vultures, Coyotes, Cottontail rabbits, Waders, Ducks, Kingfishers, Herons, Egrets, Mourning doves, Woodpeckers, Swallows, Songbirds and others.

== In popular culture ==
Wingo has been referenced in at least two songs. Norton Buffalo mentioned the town in his song "High Tide in Wingo", and later collaborated with Roy Rogers in "Ain't no Bread in the Breadbox", with a music video filmed in the ghost town.
