= Biola Branch =

Abandoned freight railway in California

The Biola Branch of the Southern Pacific Railroad (SP) was a 15.6-mile-long (25.1 km) freight branch line serving the raisin and agricultural area west of Fresno. The line ran from Fresno (Biola Junction) to Kerman, California where it connected with the Southern Pacific mainline that ran from Fresno — Tracy via Los Banos (known as the West Side Line).

The first 8.5 miles (13.7 km) of the Biola Branch between Biola Junction (Fresno) and Biola was completed by the Fresno Traction Company (which was owned by SP) on November 15, 1913. The Fresno Traction Company then immediately leased the branch to SP. One source says the entire branch was in operation as of 1920. Another source says that the branch was constructed between 1929-1930 when the SP was doing major expansion of its rail yard in Fresno. On March 3, 1930 the Biola Branch was extended 7 miles (11 km) from Biola to Kerman where it connected with SP's Los Banos Subdivision. On October 26, 1936, the branch was deeded to the SP. SP's purpose for having the Biola Branch extending from Kerman to the south end of SP's Fresno yard was so that West Side (Los Banos Subdivision) trains could enter the Fresno yard at the north (SP West) end of the yard without having to go through downtown Fresno.

On April 5, 1985, the Interstate Commerce Commission approved abandonment of the Biola Branch from MP 199.93 to MP 208.3.

The right-of-way used to run along what is today known as Gettysburg Avenue to the west of Fresno. Partial remnants of a signal tower exist on the abandoned right-of-way just west of State Route 99. You can also see where the tracks used to cross Golden State Highway at Biola Junction, just north of Ashlan Avenue in Fresno. The line ran along Gettysburg Ave which is located between the major roads of Ashlan Ave and Shaw Ave.

== Route ==
In 1937, the Biola Branch was listed as a part of the Los Banos Subdivision with the below stations:

Stations

- Kerman (MP 193.0) Junction with SP's Los Banos Subdivision - 15.6 miles (25.1 km) to Biola Jct.
- Biola (MP 200.5)
- Truman (MP 202.0)
- Everts (MP 204.0)
- West Acres (MP 206.0)
- Biola Junction (MP 208.6) Connection to the Merced Subdivision/SP Mainline
