= Saint Victor Parish (San Jose) =

Church parish in California, United States

St. Victor Parish is a territorial parish of the Roman Catholic Diocese of San Jose in California, located in the Berryessa neighborhood of San Jose, California. The parish was founded in 1961 by the Rev. James Prendeville, and was named for Pope Victor I. Its territory was taken from St. Patrick Parish and Saint John Vianney Parish in San Jose and Saint John the Baptist Parish in Milpitas. The first Mass was celebrated on October 29, 1961, the feast of Christ the King, in an old farm house that Mateo and Ann Sunseri made available to the community.
