= Saint Victor School =

Catholic school in California, United States

Location
- 3150 Sierra Road; San Jose, California 95132; United States; 37.3972°N 121.8511°W

Information
- Type: Private, coeducational
- Religious affiliation: Diocese of San Jose
- Opened: 1964
- Principal: Victoria Hinkle
- Grades: Pre-K-8
- Team name: Chargers
- Website: https://www.stvictorschool.org/

Saint Victor School is a Catholic elementary and junior high school operated by Saint Victor Parish in San Jose, California, United States. It serves families of the Diocese of San Jose, from kindergarten to eighth grade.
