= San Jose Flea Market =

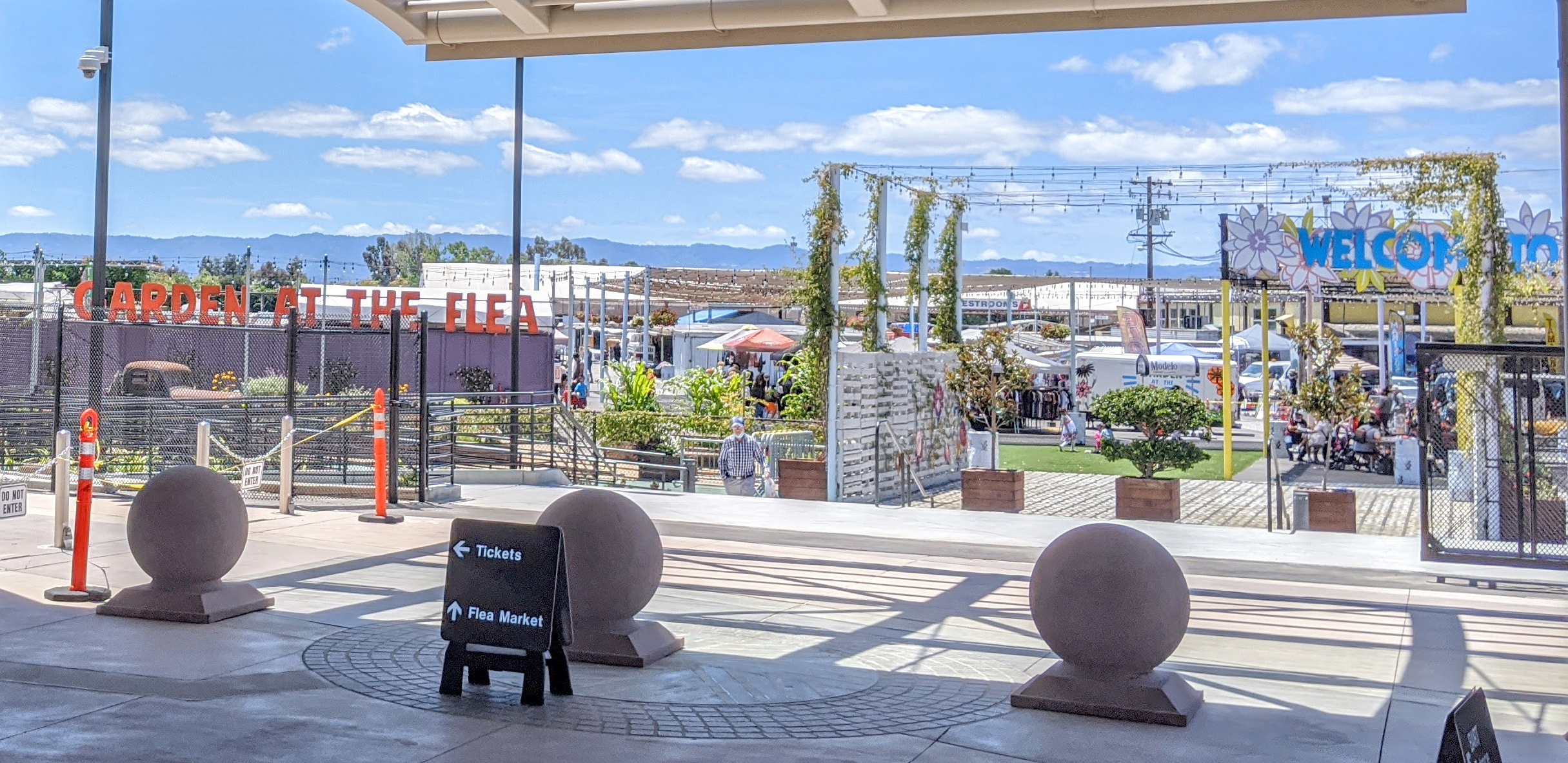
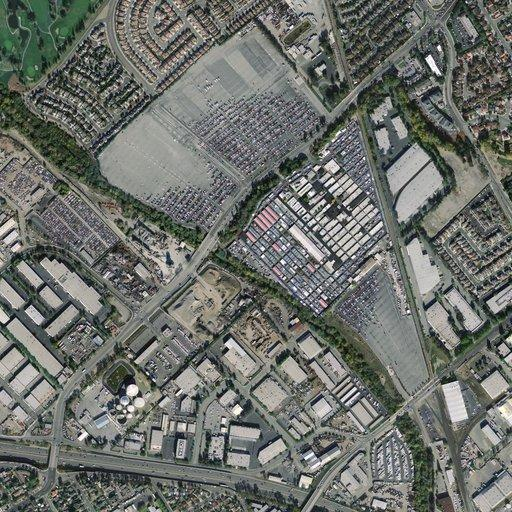
- Entrance to the market from the Berryessa BART station (top) and aerial image of the market (bottom).
- Coordinates: 37°22′09″N 121°52′44″W
- Address: 1590 Berryessa Rd; San Jose, CA 95133
- Opened: March 1960; 66 years ago
- Floor area: 120 acres (49 ha)
- Parking: onsite
- Public transit: VTA: 61, 70, 77, 500, 523; BART: Berryessa
- Website: sjfm.com

The San Jose Flea Market is an urban flea market, located in the Berryessa district of San Jose, California.

== History ==
The San Jose Flea Market was originally known as the Berryessa Flea Market, located at 12000 Berryessa Road (near the intersection with Lundy, slightly east of the current location), and was founded in 1960, by George Bumb, Lawrence Headrick, and Joe Kokes. Brian Bumb Sr., son of George Bumb Sr., supervised and was part owner of the San Jose Flea Market along his other brothers, George Bumb Jr., and Timothy Bumb.

=== Fire ===
On Wednesday, November 29, 2006, a huge fire burned down 24 stands of Produce Row at the San Jose Flea Market. At 6:01 p.m, a 911 call was made and dozens of fire crews and a helicopter arrived to put out the flames. Although the fire was contained at 7:15 p.m, more than $200,000 worth of merchandise was destroyed. Burnt nuts, fruit, vegetables, plants, and plastic were strewn all over the ground. Theresa Bumb, daughter of Brian Bumb Sr., stated that they would do their best to help those who were affected by the fire by offering free or reduced rent.

=== Future developments ===
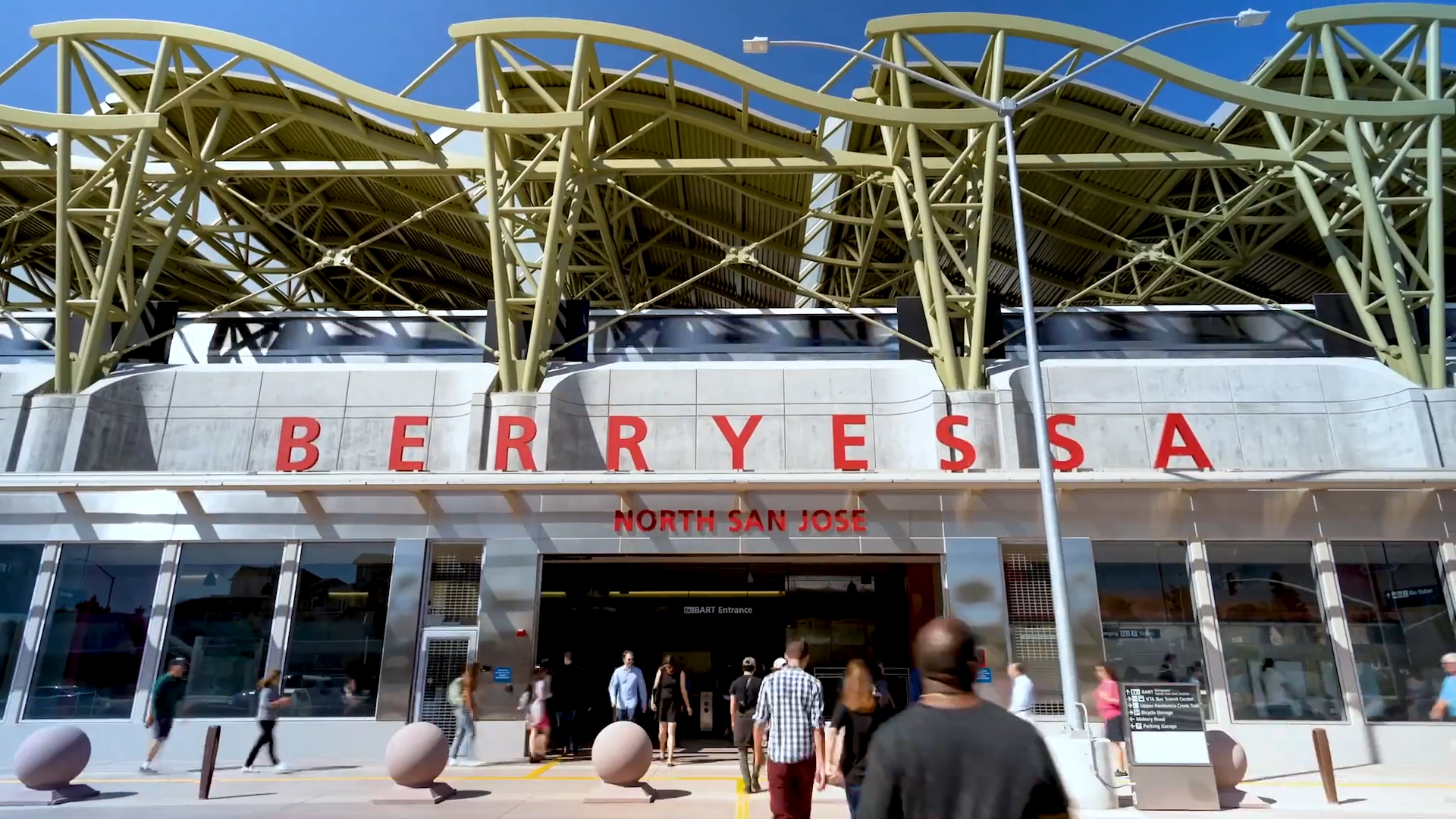
The Berryessa/North San José station, served by Bay Area Rapid Transit (BART), began service in 2020.

On August 14, 2007, the San Jose City Council approved the proposal to rezone the property on Berryessa Road to allow for a 2,800-house development. The Council took suggestions from the public and concluded in an approval of the motion by a 10 to 1 vote. The lone disapproving vote was cast because the Council member felt the requirements the city gave the Bumb family were very excessive. The motion approved the Bumb Family’s plan to potentially develop the land on which the San Jose Flea Market is currently located. At the time the proposal was approved, Bumb family expressed no immediate plans or timeline to develop the Flea Market grounds.

In January 2019, the San Jose City Council held a community meeting presenting proposed plans for a mix of housing, retail, parks and a future medical building on the land north of Berryessa Road. A significant part of this area was previously used as parking for the flea market. A large retail center including a Safeway and CVS Pharmacy have since been developed and opened on the northwest corner of Berryessa and Sierra Rd. The large triangular section of land south of Berryessa Rd on which the flea market shops and stands are currently located is proposed for commercial buildings.

== Operations ==
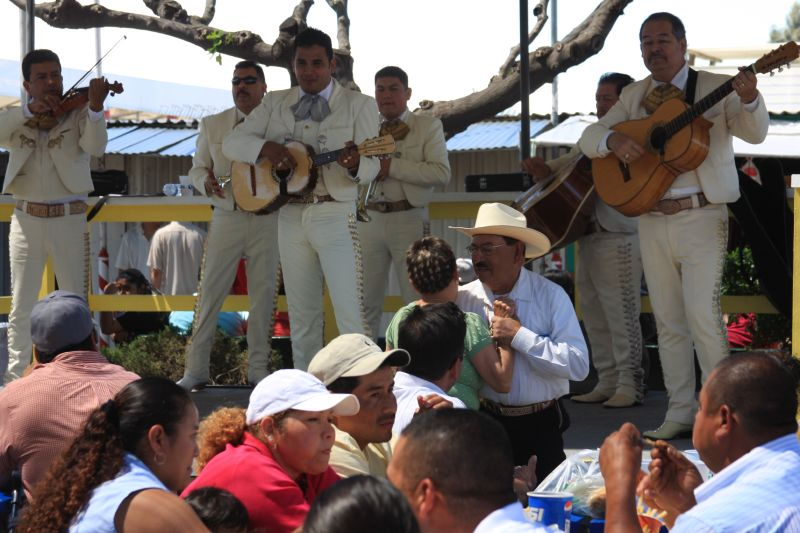
Mariachi performance at the market

=== Attractions ===
The eight miles (13 km) worth of aisles allows for over 2000 vendors to sell an array of goods. In 1987, the Flea Market claimed to have 2,400 vendors and more than 4 million visitors per year. With a population and land mass larger than some small towns, the Flea Market is a major contributor to the income of many local families. Some of the items found at the Flea Market include jewelry, furniture, clothing, fruit, vegetables, shoes, collectibles, toys, books, cars, car stereo equipment, artwork, tools, toiletries, cosmetics, and cookware, among many other things.

Along with the material items sold at the Flea Market, there are also many restaurants that are owned and operated by The Flea Market, Inc. and sell both American and Mexican food. Additionally, the Flea Market features traveling food carts that sell beer, soda, and churros. The largest section of the Flea Market is its Farmers Market, which stretches slightly more than a quarter of a mile through the market and contains fruit and vegetables from California’s farmers.

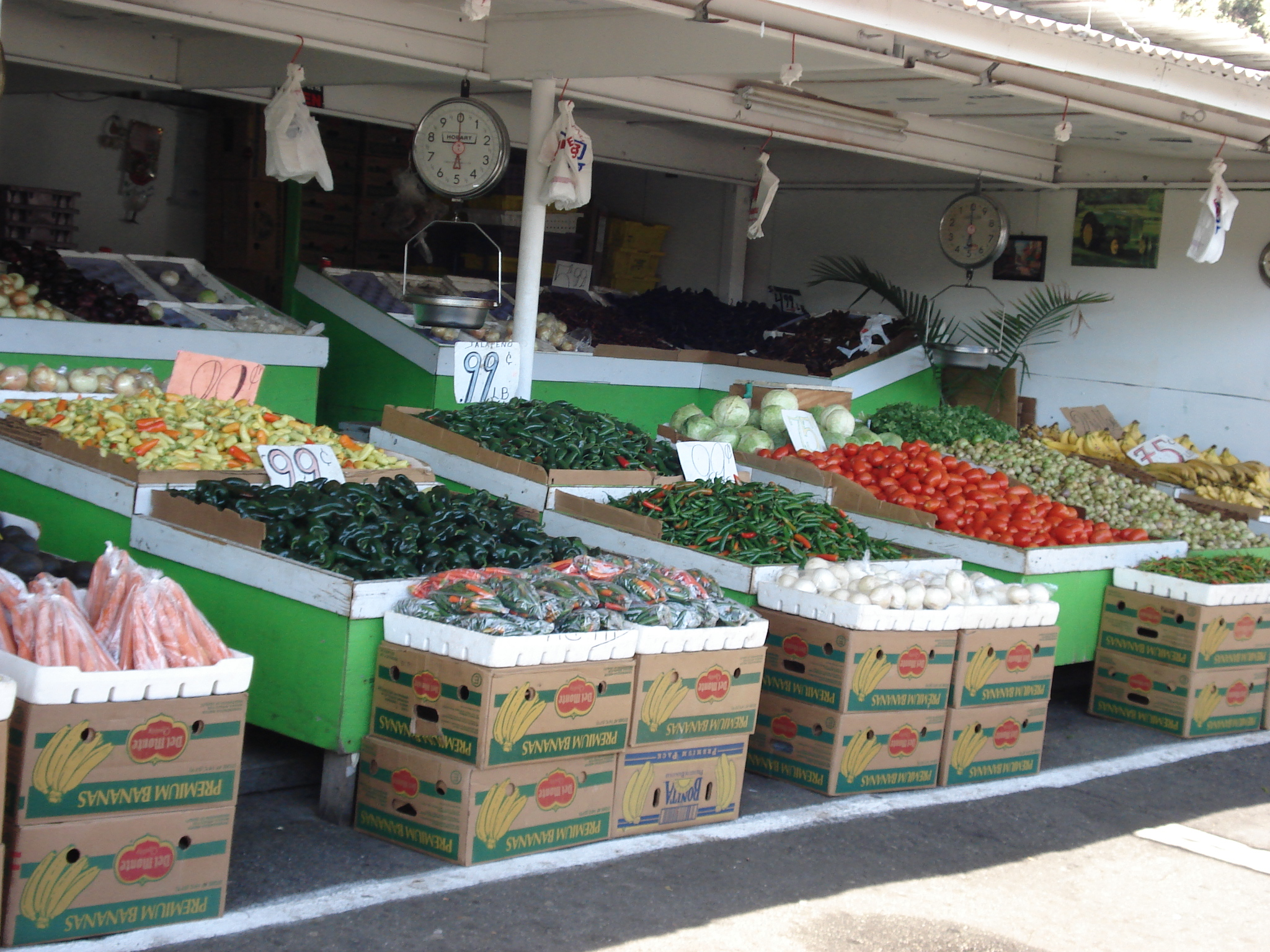
Produce vendor at the market

The Flea Market features a variety of entertainment options every weekend. There are two stages on the Flea Market grounds, one of which consistently reserved for a Mexican Mariachi band. A vintage carousel, an arcade, three playgrounds, and carnival rides are among the attractions developed at the Flea Market for children.

=== Site ===
The entire 120.3-acre (48.7 ha) site is divided into a northern area (north of Berryessa) and a southern area (south of Berryessa). The northern area is 57.05 acres (23.09 ha) and the southern area is 63.25 acres (25.60 ha). The northern area was used for Flea Market parking prior to redevelopment into a transit-oriented residences after 2007; the southern area retains the Flea Market and a smaller parking lot.

In June 2020, the Berryessa/North San José station opened, allowing for access to the site via BART which serves as a connector rail service for much of the San Francisco Bay Area region.

== In popular culture ==
- The Flea Market is a key setting in Khaled Hosseini's novel The Kite Runner.
