= Bull Creek (Pennington County, South Dakota) =

Stream in South Dakota, United States

Coordinates: 44°12′33″N 102°22′20″W

Bull Creek is a stream in Pennington County, South Dakota, in the United States. It is a tributary of the Cheyenne River.

Bull Creek was named from a buffalo bull which was seen stuck in the creek.

== See also ==
- List of rivers of South Dakota
