= Bummerville, California =

Unincorporated community in California, United States

Bummerville
- Unincorporated community
- Location in California Bummerville (the United States)
- Coordinates: 38°24′05″N 120°30′21″W
- Country: United States
- State: California
- County: Calaveras
- Elevation: 2,946 ft (898 m)

Bummerville is an unincorporated community in Calaveras County, California, United States, approximately one mile east of West Point. It has frequently been noted on lists of unusual place names. It lies at an elevation of 898 m (2946 ft) and is located at 38°24′05″N 120°30′21″W.

Bummerville was known historically for its gold and tungsten mining operations. It once had a school, hotel, blacksmith shop, and several boarding-houses. Today, the community consists mostly of residences on Bummerville Road.
