= Biola, California =

Biola
- Unincorporated Community; Census Designated Place
- Location in Fresno County and the state of California

- Location in the United States
- Coordinates: 36°48′08″N 120°00′59″W
- Country: United States
- State: California
- County: Fresno

Government
  - State Senator: Anna Caballero (D)
  - State Assembly: Esmeralda Soria (D)
  - U. S. Congress: Adam Gray (D)

Area
  - Total: 0.65 sq mi (1.68 km^{2})
  - Land: 0.65 sq mi (1.68 km^{2})
  - Water: 0 sq mi (0.00 km^{2}) 0%
- Elevation: 253 ft (77 m)

Population (2020)
  - Total: 1,427
  - Density: 2,205.5/sq mi (851.53/km^{2})
- Time zone: UTC-8 (PST)
  - Summer (DST): UTC-7 (PDT)
- ZIP code: 93606
- Area code: 559
- FIPS code: 06-06728
- GNIS feature IDs: 1659697, 2407849

Biola is a census-designated place (CDP) in Fresno County, California, United States. The population was 1,427 at the 2020 census, down from 1,623 at the 2010 census. Biola is located 6 miles (9.7 km) north-northeast of Kerman, at an elevation of 253 feet (77 m).

== Geography ==
According to the United States Census Bureau, the CDP has a total area of 0.6 square miles (1.6 km^{2}), all land.

== History ==
Biola was founded by William Kerckhoff in 1912. The name was an acronym of the "Bible Institute of Los Angeles". A post office operated in Biola from 1912 to 1918, and from 1920 to the present.

== Demographics ==
Historical population
Census	Pop.	Note	%±
2000	1,037		—
2010	1,623		56.5%
2020	1,427		−12.1%
U.S. Decennial Census; 1850–1870 1880-1890; 1900 1910 1920; 1930 1940 1950; 1960 1970 1980; 1990 2000 2010

Biola first appeared as a census designated place in the 2000 U.S. census.

=== 2020 census ===
As of the 2020 census, Biola had a population of 1,427. The population density was 2,205.6 inhabitants per square mile (851.6/km^{2}). The median age was 26.2 years. The age distribution was 519 people (36.4%) under the age of 18, 167 people (11.7%) aged 18 to 24, 353 people (24.7%) aged 25 to 44, 273 people (19.1%) aged 45 to 64, and 115 people (8.1%) who were 65 years of age or older. For every 100 females there were 97.1 males, and for every 100 females age 18 and over there were 103.6 males age 18 and over.

The whole population lived in households. There were 333 households, of which 181 (54.4%) had children under the age of 18 living in them. Of all households, 46.5% were married-couple households, 17.1% were households with a male householder and no spouse or partner present, 31.2% were households with a female householder and no spouse or partner present, and 5.1% were cohabiting couple households. About 15.9% of all households were made up of individuals, including 28 one-person households (8.4%) with someone aged 65 or older. The average household size was 4.29. There were 272 families (81.7% of all households).

There were 344 housing units at an average density of 531.7 units per square mile (205.3 units/km^{2}). Of these, 333 (96.8%) were occupied, with 179 (53.8%) owner-occupied and 154 (46.2%) occupied by renters, and 11 (3.2%) were vacant. The homeowner vacancy rate was 0.6% and the rental vacancy rate was 0.0%.

In the same census, 0.0% of residents lived in urban areas, while 100.0% lived in rural areas.

Racial composition as of the 2020 census
Race	Number	Percent
White	316	22.1%
Black or African American	3	0.2%
American Indian and Alaska Native	46	3.2%
Asian	120	8.4%
Native Hawaiian and Other Pacific Islander	3	0.2%
Some other race	725	50.8%
Two or more races	214	15.0%
Hispanic or Latino (of any race)	1,243	87.1%

== Climate ==
The Köppen Climate Classification subtype for this climate is "BSk" (Tropical and Subtropical Steppe Climate). This climate type occurs primarily on the periphery of the true deserts in low-latitude semiarid steppe regions.

Climate data for Biola, California
Month	Jan	Feb	Mar	Apr	May	Jun	Jul	Aug	Sep	Oct	Nov	Dec	Year
Mean daily maximum °F (°C)	53 (12)	61 (16)	67 (19)	75 (24)	84 (29)	92 (33)	98 (37)	96 (36)	91 (33)	80 (27)	66 (19)	55 (13)	77 (25)
Mean daily minimum °F (°C)	36 (2)	39 (4)	42 (6)	45 (7)	51 (11)	57 (14)	61 (16)	60 (16)	55 (13)	47 (8)	40 (4)	35 (2)	47 (8)
Average precipitation inches (cm)	2 (5.1)	1.9 (4.8)	1.8 (4.6)	1.1 (2.8)	0.4 (1.0)	0.1 (0.25)	0 (0)	0 (0)	0.1 (0.25)	0.6 (1.5)	1.2 (3.0)	1.8 (4.6)	11 (28)
Average precipitation days	8	7	7	4	2	1	0	0	1	2	5	7	44
Source: Weatherbase

== Education ==
Biola is served by the Central Unified School District.

== See also ==
- Biola Branch (Southern Pacific)
