= Baltimore Park, Larkspur, California =

Baltimore Park
- Former unincorporated community District of Larkspur
- Location in California
- Coordinates: 37°55′51″N 122°31′57″W
- Country: United States
- State: California
- County: Marin County
- City: Larkspur
- Elevation: 43 ft (13 m)

Baltimore Park is a former unincorporated community now incorporated in Larkspur in Marin County, California. It lies at an elevation of 43 feet (13 m).
