= Bucks Lake, California =

Bucks Lake
- Unincorporated Community; Census Designated Place
- Location in Plumas County and the state of California

- Location in the United States
- Coordinates: 39°52′21″N 121°10′41″W
- Country: United States
- State: California
- County: Plumas

Area
  - Total: 10.35 sq mi (26.81 km^{2})
  - Land: 10.34 sq mi (26.78 km^{2})
  - Water: 0.0077 sq mi (0.02 km^{2}) 0.08%
- Elevation: 5,161 ft (1,573 m)

Population (2020)
  - Total: 22
  - Density: 2.1/sq mi (0.82/km^{2})
- Time zone: UTC-8 (Pacific (PST))
  - Summer (DST): UTC-7 (PDT)
- ZIP code: 95971
- Area code: 530
- FIPS code: 06-08744
- GNIS feature IDs: 1853378, 2407918

California Historical Landmark
- Reference no.: 197

Bucks Lake (also, Bucks Lodge) is a census-designated place (CDP) in Plumas County, California, United States. Bucks Lake is located on the south shore of the lake of the same name, 13 miles (20.9 km) west-southwest in Quincy. The population was 22 at the 2020 census, up from 10 at the 2010 census.

== History ==
The area was first established as a ranch by Horace Bucklin and Francis Walker in 1850. A hotel and a post office were later built on the site. In 1928, Bucks Storage Dam was built on Bucks Creek, a tributary of the Feather River, creating the Bucks Lake reservoir and inundating the original site of the town.

The Bucks Lake post office operated from 1940 to 1942.

Bucks Lake is now registered as California Historical Landmark #197.

== Geography ==
Bucks Lake is located at 39°52′21″N 121°10′41″W (39.872496, -121.178096).

According to the United States Census Bureau, the CDP has a total area of 10.4 square miles (27 km^{2}), of which 10.3 square miles (27 km^{2}) is land and 0.08% is water.

== Demographics ==
Historical population
Census	Pop.	Note	%±
2000	17		—
2010	10		−41.2%
2020	22		120.0%
U.S. Decennial Census; 1850–1870 1880-1890; 1900 1910 1920; 1930 1940 1950; 1960 1970 1980; 1990 2000 2010

Bucks Lake first appeared as a census designated place in the 2000 U.S. census.

=== Racial and ethnic composition ===
Bucks Lake CDP, California – Racial and ethnic composition Note: the US Census treats Hispanic/Latino as an ethnic category. This table excludes Latinos from the racial categories and assigns them to a separate category. Hispanics/Latinos may be of any race.
Race / Ethnicity (NH = Non-Hispanic)	Pop 2000	Pop 2010	Pop 2020	% 2000	% 2010	% 2020
White alone (NH)	17	7	21	100.00%	70.00%	95.45%
Black or African American alone (NH)	0	0	0	0.00%	0.00%	0.00%
Native American or Alaska Native alone (NH)	0	0	0	0.00%	0.00%	0.00%
Asian alone (NH)	0	0	0	0.00%	0.00%	0.00%
Native Hawaiian or Pacific Islander alone (NH)	0	0	0	0.00%	0.00%	0.00%
Other race alone (NH)	0	0	0	0.00%	0.00%	0.00%
Mixed race or Multiracial (NH)	0	0	1	0.00%	0.00%	4.55%
Hispanic or Latino (any race)	0	3	0	0.00%	30.00%	0.00%
Total	17	10	22	100.00%	100.00%	100.00%

=== 2020 census ===
As of the 2020 census, Bucks Lake had a population of 22. The median age was 41.7 years. 9.1% of residents were under the age of 18 and 9.1% of residents were 65 years of age or older. For every 100 females there were 266.7 males, and for every 100 females age 18 and over there were 300.0 males age 18 and over.

0.0% of residents lived in urban areas, while 100.0% lived in rural areas.

There were 7 households in Bucks Lake, of which 28.6% had children under the age of 18 living in them. Of all households, 0.0% were married-couple households, 0.0% were households with a male householder and no spouse or partner present, and 100.0% were households with a female householder and no spouse or partner present. About 71.4% of all households were made up of individuals and 28.6% had someone living alone who was 65 years of age or older.

There were 230 housing units, of which 97.0% were vacant. The homeowner vacancy rate was 100.0% and the rental vacancy rate was 0.0%.

=== 2010 census ===
At the 2010 census, Bucks Lake had a population of 10. The population density was 1.0 people per square mile (0.4/km^{2}). The racial makeup of Bucks Lake was 7 (70.0%) White, 0 (0.0%) African American, 0 (0.0%) Native American, 1 (10.0%) Asian, 0 (0.0%) Pacific Islander, 0 (0.0%) from other races, and 2 (20.0%) from two or more races. Hispanic or Latino of any race were 3 people (30.0%).

The whole population lived in households; no one lived in non-institutionalized group quarters, and no one was institutionalized.

There were 4 households, 1 (25.0%) had children under the age of 18 living in them, 3 (75.0%) were opposite-sex married couples living together, 0 (0%) had a female householder with no husband present, 1 (25.0%) had a male householder with no wife present. There were 1 (25.0%) unmarried opposite-sex partnerships, and 0 (0%) same-sex married couples or partnerships. 0 households (0%) were one person, and 0 (0%) had someone living alone who was 65 or older. The average household size was 2.50. There were 4 families (100% of households); the average family size was 2.25.

The age distribution was 2 people (20.0%) under the age of 18, 0 people (0%) aged 18 to 24, 2 people (20.0%) aged 25 to 44, 3 people (30.0%) aged 45 to 64, and 3 people (30.0%) who were 65 or older. The median age was 63.3 years. For every 100 females, there were 100.0 males. For every 100 females age 18 and over, there were 100.0 males.

There were 261 housing units at an average density of 25.2 per square mile. Of the occupied units, 4 (100%) were owner-occupied, and 0 (0%) were rented. The homeowner vacancy rate was 33.3%; the rental vacancy rate was 0%. 10 people (100% of the population) lived in owner-occupied housing units, and 0 people (0%) lived in rental housing units.

=== 2000 census ===
At the 2000 census, there were 17 people, 7 households, and 4 families in the CDP. The population density was 1.6 people per square mile (0.6/km^{2}). There were 253 housing units at an average density of 24.5 per square mile (9.5/km^{2}). The racial makeup of the CDP was 100.00% White. Of the 7 households, 14.3% had children under the age of 18 living with them, 71.4% were married couples living together, and 28.6% were non-families. 28.6% of households were one person, and none had someone living alone who was 65 or older. The average household size was 2.43, and the average family size was 3.00.

The age distribution was 17.6% under the age of 18, 5.9% from 18 to 24, 17.6% from 25 to 44, 52.9% from 45 to 64, and 5.9% 65 or older. The median age was 52 years. For every 100 females, there were 54.5 males. For every 100 females age 18 and over, there were 75.0 males.

The median household income was $56,250, and the median family income was $56,250. Males had a median income of $0 versus $0 for females. The per capita income for the CDP was $23,571. None of the population and none of the families were below the poverty line.

== Politics ==
In the state legislature, Bucks Lake is in the 1st senatorial district, represented by Republican Megan Dahle, and the 1st Assembly district, represented by Republican Heather Hadwick.

Federally, Bucks Lake is in California's 3rd congressional district, represented by Independent Kevin Kiley.

== Education ==
The school district is Plumas Unified School District.
