= Berryessa, San Jose =

Berryessa
- Neighborhood of San Jose
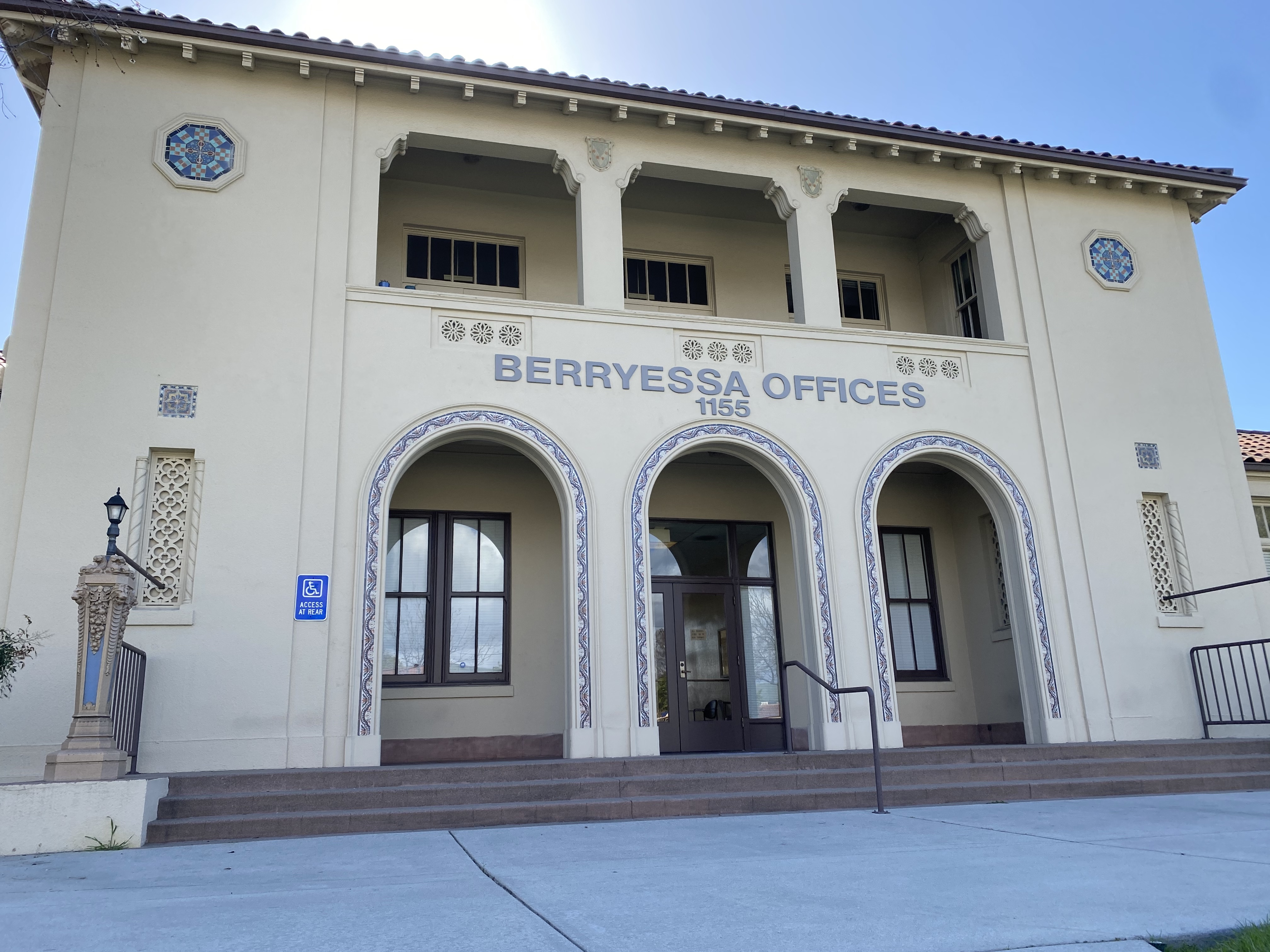
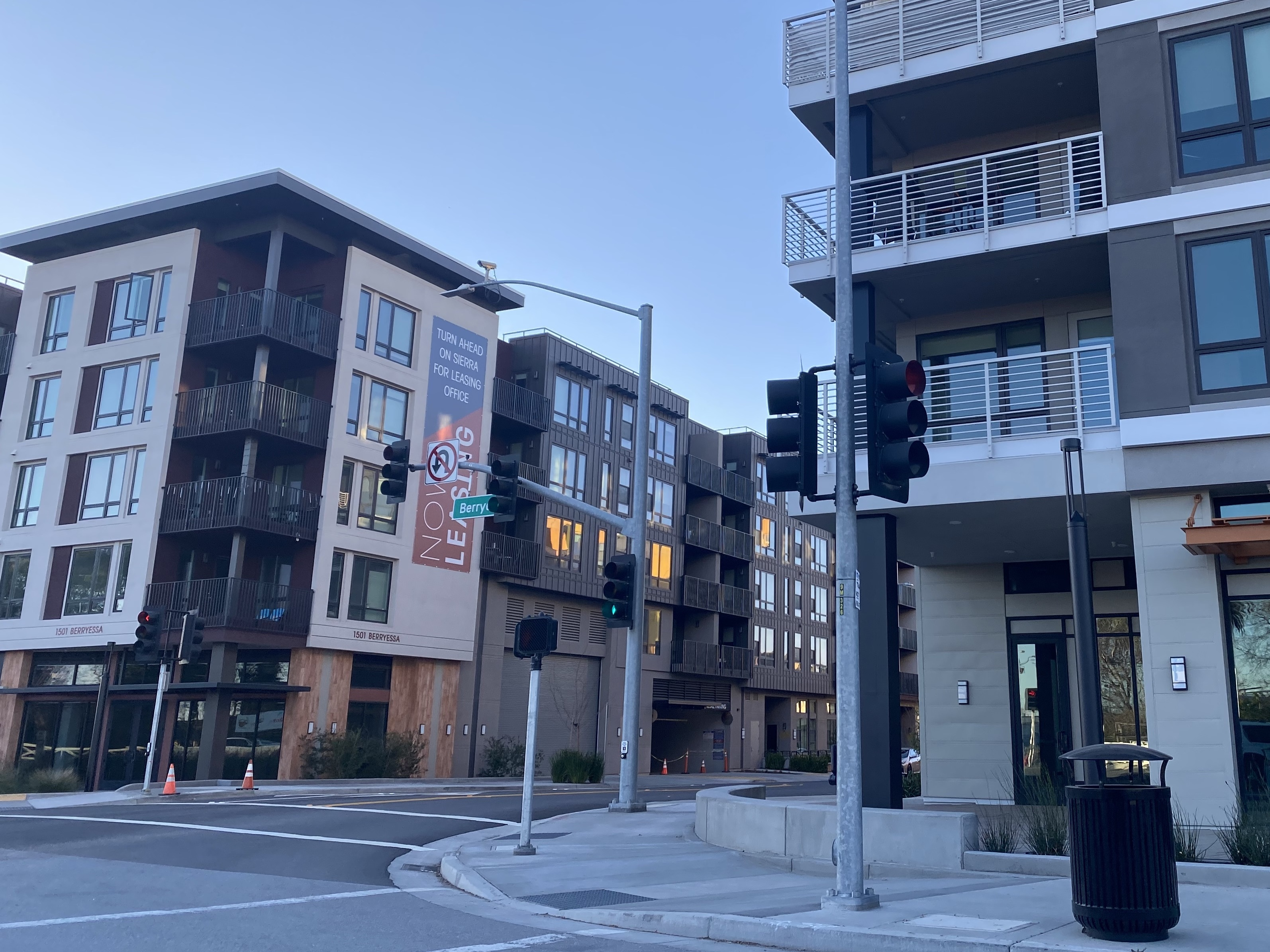
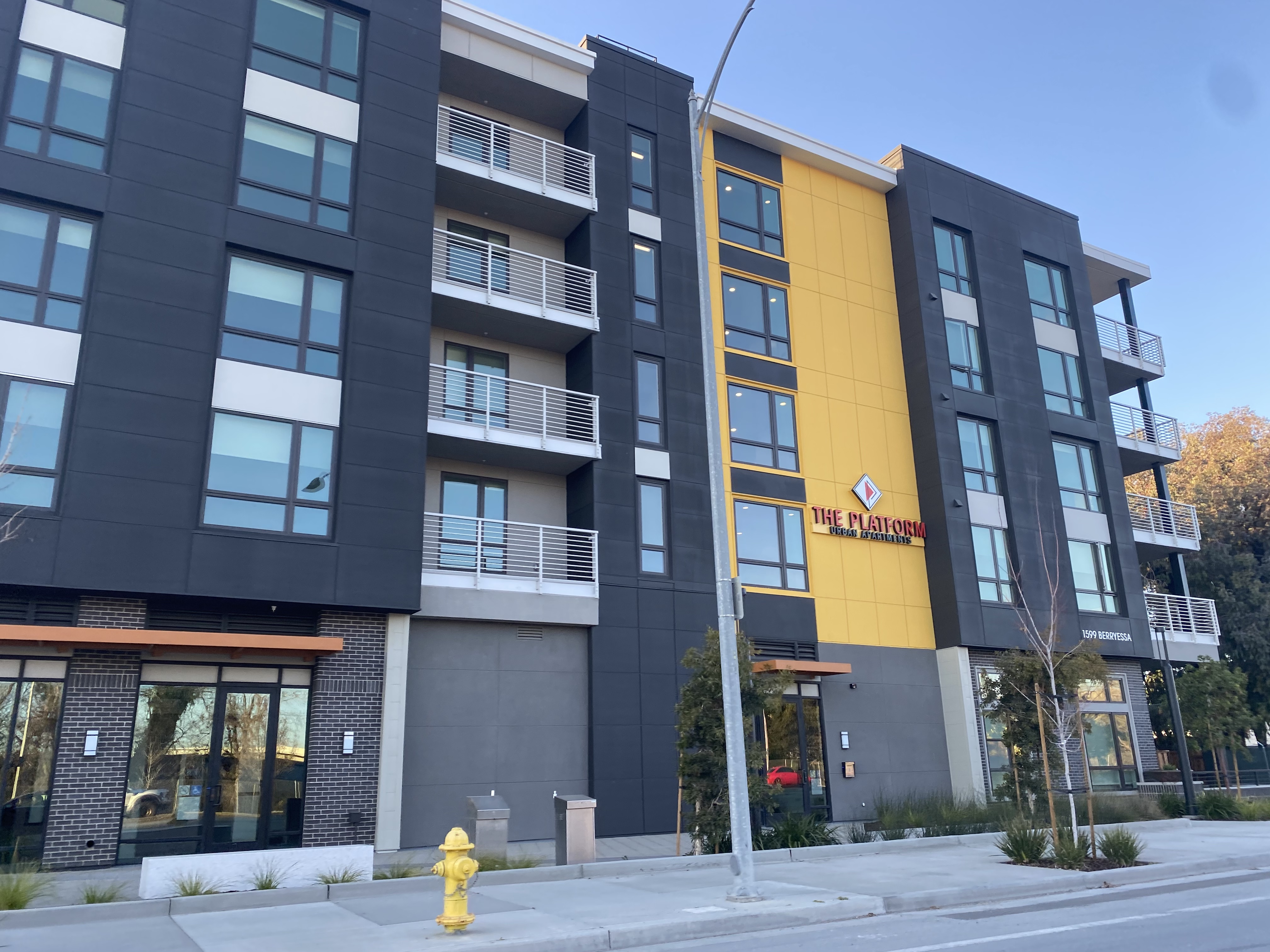
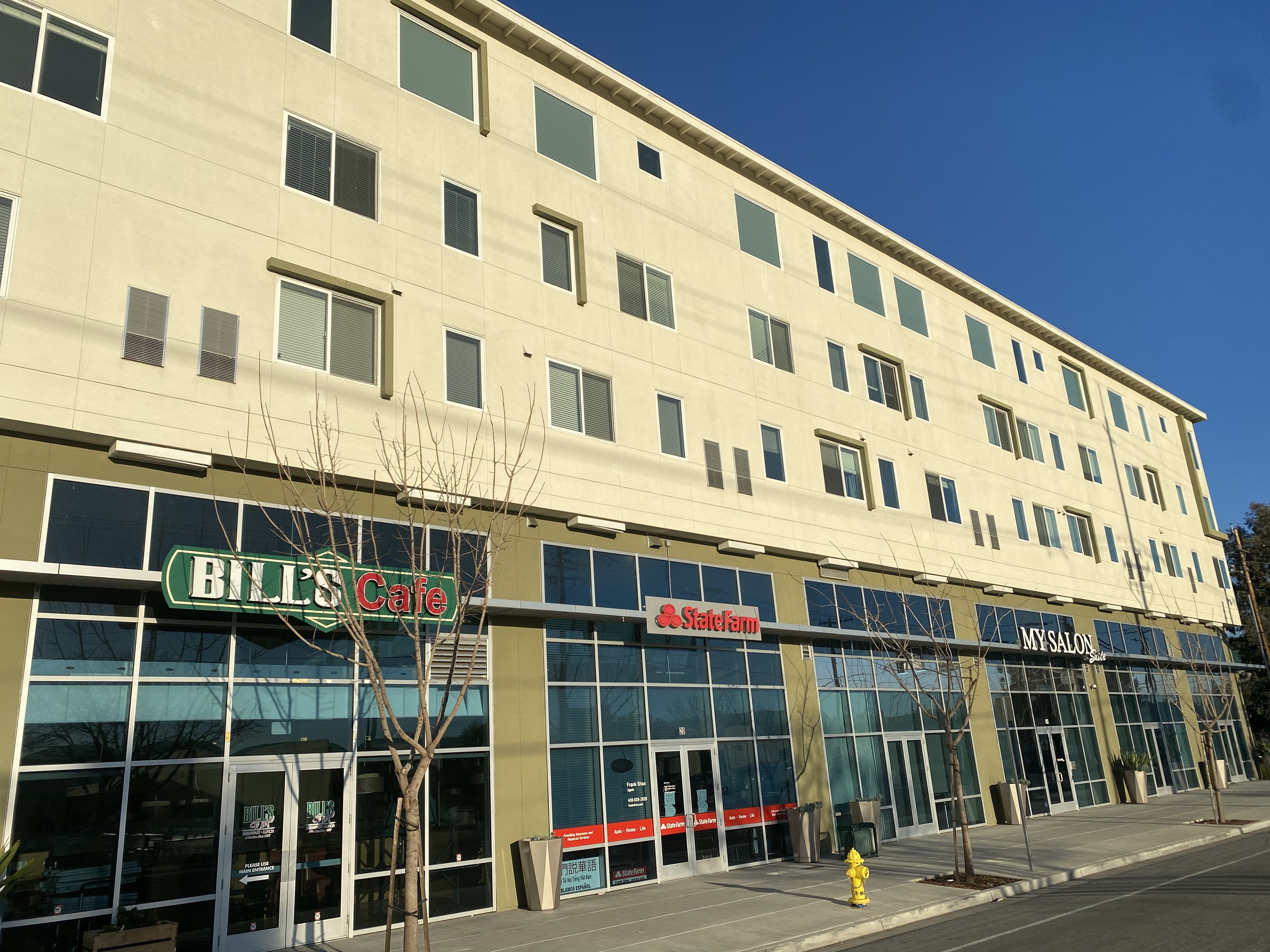
- Nickname: North Valley
- Location within San Jose
- Coordinates: 37.386329°N 121.86051°W
- Country: United States
- State: California
- County: Santa Clara
- City: San Jose

Berryessa is a district of San Jose, California, located in North San Jose. The district is named after the Berryessa family, a prominent Californio family of the Bay Area which historically owned most of the area.

== History ==
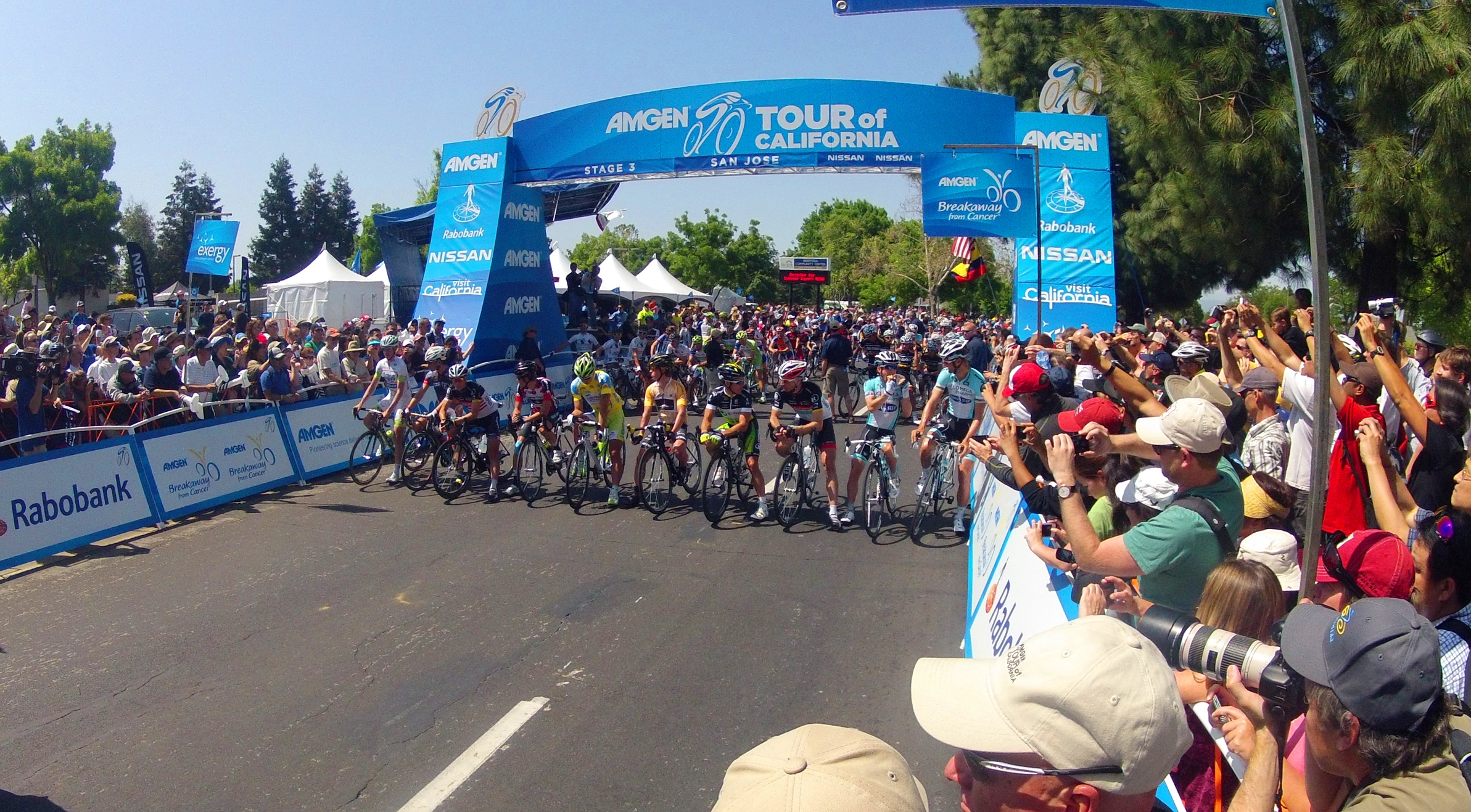
Berryessa hosted a segment of the 2012 Tour of California.

In the late 19th century, Berryessa was a small farming community, well-known across California for its high-quality fruit. Hostetter Road, Capitol Avenue, Piedmont Road, and Lundy Avenue were formerly surrounded by apricot and prune orchards. The J. F. Flickinger Fruit Packing Company, one of the largest fruit packing companies in the Santa Clara Valley, was located around present-day Hostetter Road. In the 1960s and 70s, the land where the orchards stood was developed into suburban residential neighborhoods and businesses. Today, tiny remnants of the orchards remain, including the Orlando Farm. In 2013 it, too, was developed into housing on Capitol Avenue and the Mattos' apricot orchard off Piedmont Road.

Today, Berryessa is distinguished as a fast-growing bedroom community of San Jose. It is served by VTA light rail and (in 2019), an extension of the Bay Area Rapid Transit BART system.

The old Berryessa Elementary School building, built in 1927, is a Spanish Colonial Revival style, designed by noted Northern California architect W.H. Weeks. The building has served as a commercial space since 1983.

== Geography ==
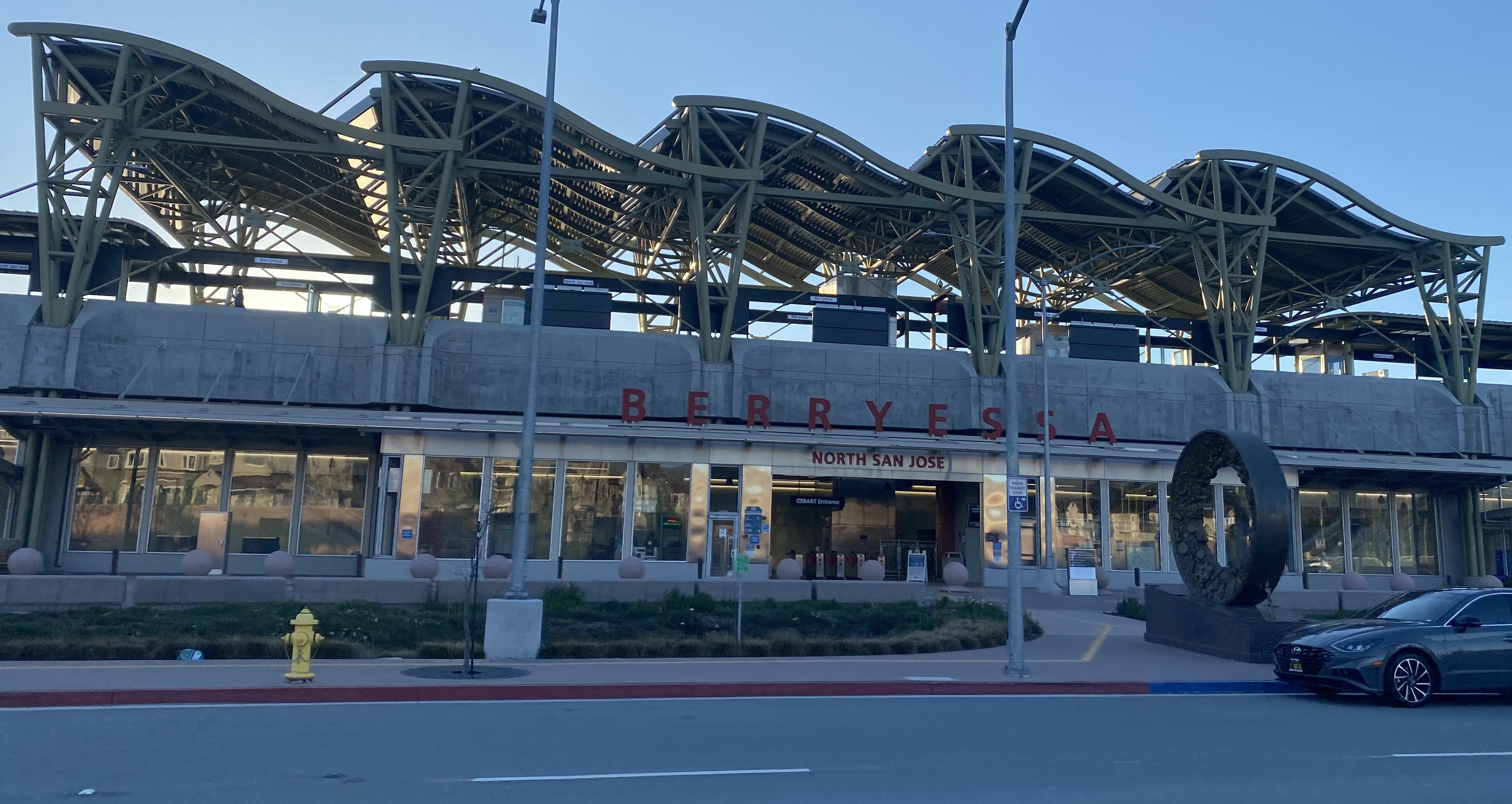
Berryessa/North San José station (BART).

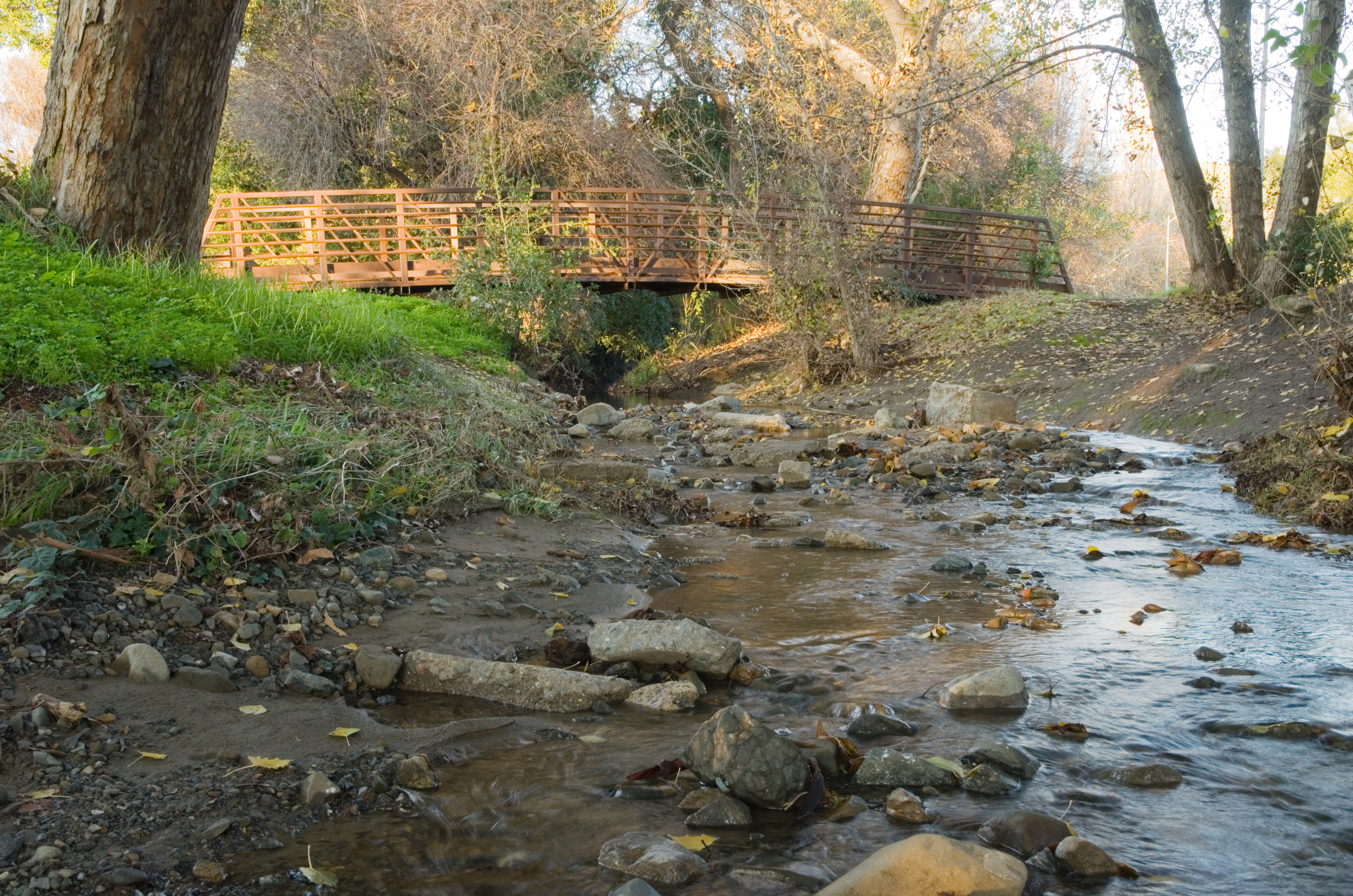
Berryessa Creek Park.

The district borders Milpitas along Landess Avenue to the north and the Alum Rock neighborhood of East San Jose along Mabury Road to the south (needs citation). The County Assessor lists Golf Drive as the southern boundary east of White Road.

The large majority of the primarily residential community is part of the Fourth City Council District, along with Alviso and North San Jose. It was represented by Chuck Reed, prior to his election as Mayor of San Jose. The current district representative is David Cohen. Part of the southern portion of Berryessa, below Penitencia Creek Road, is represented by Councilmember David Ortiz, District 5. This includes the neighborhood around Toyon Elementary School, but not the school itself. Toyon Elementary was part of the Berryessa Union School District prior to it being closed following the 2024/25 school year. There is also a small unincorporated County area of Berryessa that is represented by District 2 County Supervisor Betty Duong.

=== Parks ===
- Berryessa Creek Park
- Penitencia Creek Park
- Alum Rock Park
- Boccardo Loop Trail
- Cataldi Park

== Community ==
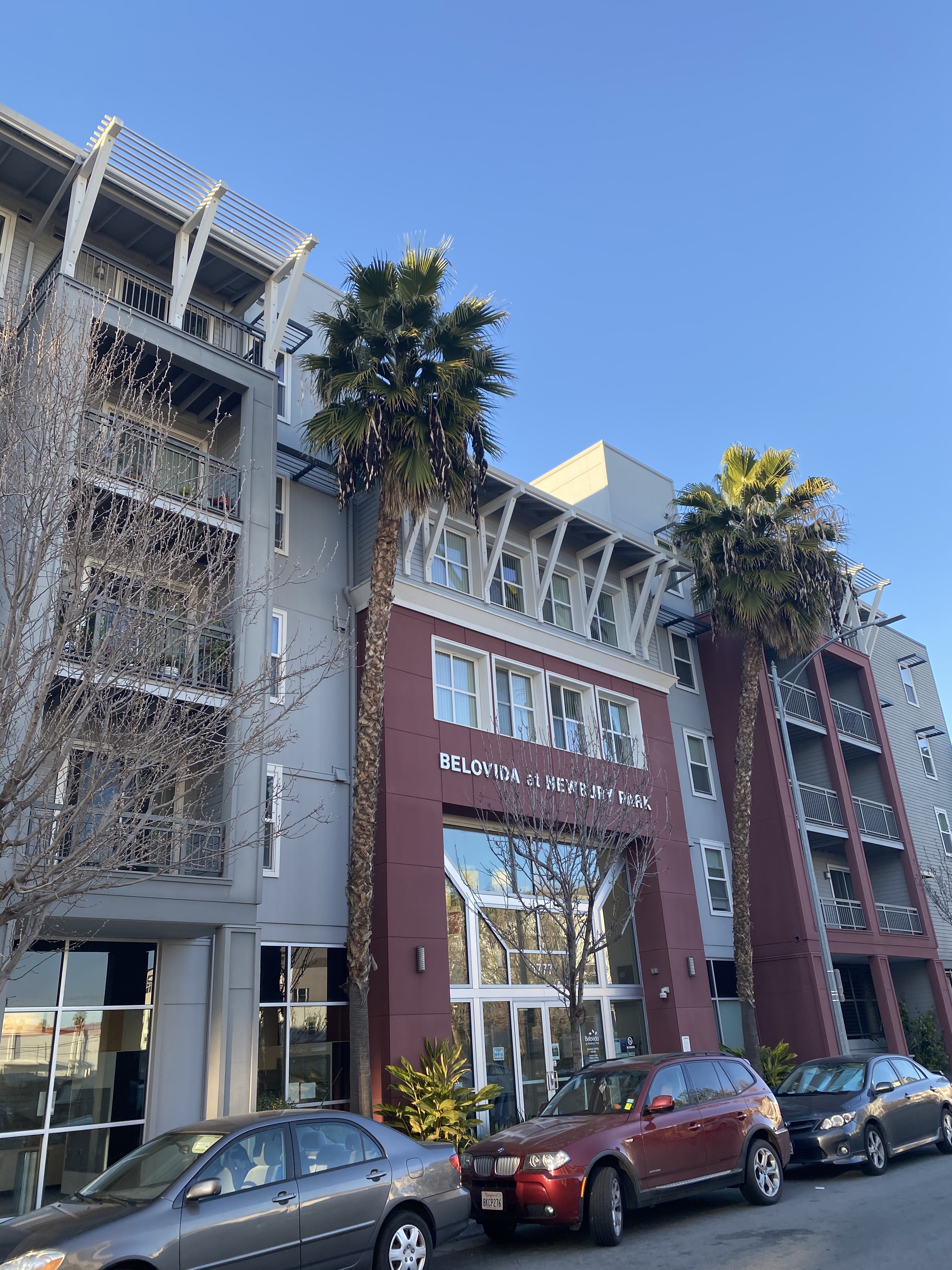
Apartments at Newbury Park.

San Jose Public Library operates the Berryessa Branch Library and the Educational Park Branch Library.

Berryessa is home to the long-established San Jose Flea Market.

=== Berryessa Art & Wine Festival ===
The annual Berryessa Art & Wine Festival, one of the best-known local events in the area, has been a tradition for over 40 years.

The festival is typically held in May. It includes 120-150 artist booths and 14 food booths, run by Berryessa non-profit groups. Community Row features booths from various service groups and non-profits that offer information to the festival-goers. Business Row has representatives from the Berryessa community and other local San Jose businesses. A stage area features local amateur and professional entertainment, and there are booths from several local radio stations.

The festival is held on the grounds of Penitencia Creek Park.

== Transportation ==
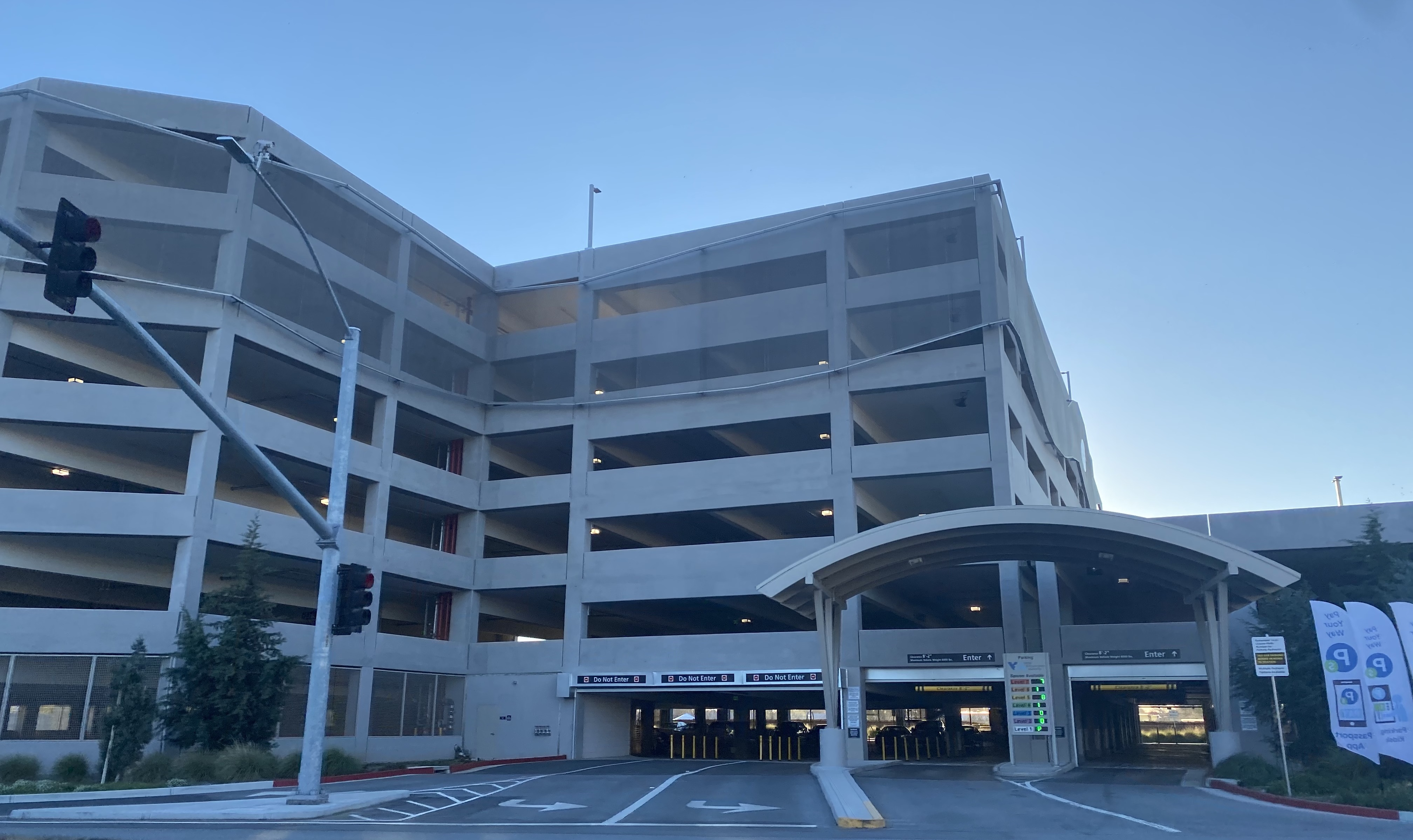
Garage at the BART Berryessa/North San Jose station.

Berryessa is well-served by two regional transit systems: VTA light rail and BART.

- VTA light rail:
  - Berryessa (VTA)
  - Cropley (VTA)
  - Hostetter (VTA)
  - Penitencia Creek (VTA)
- BART:
  - Berryessa/North San Jose station

== Education ==
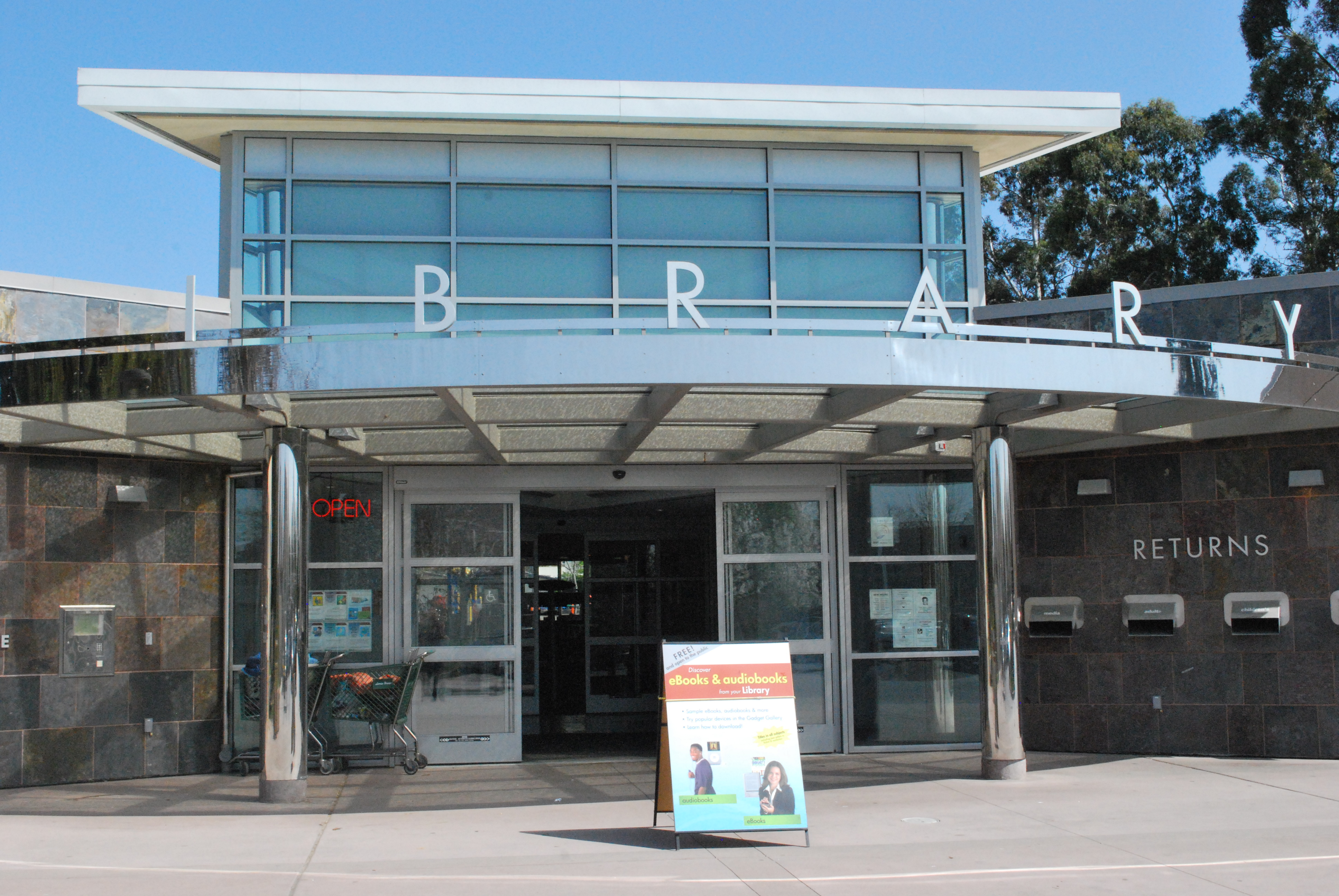
Berryessa Branch of the San José Public Library.

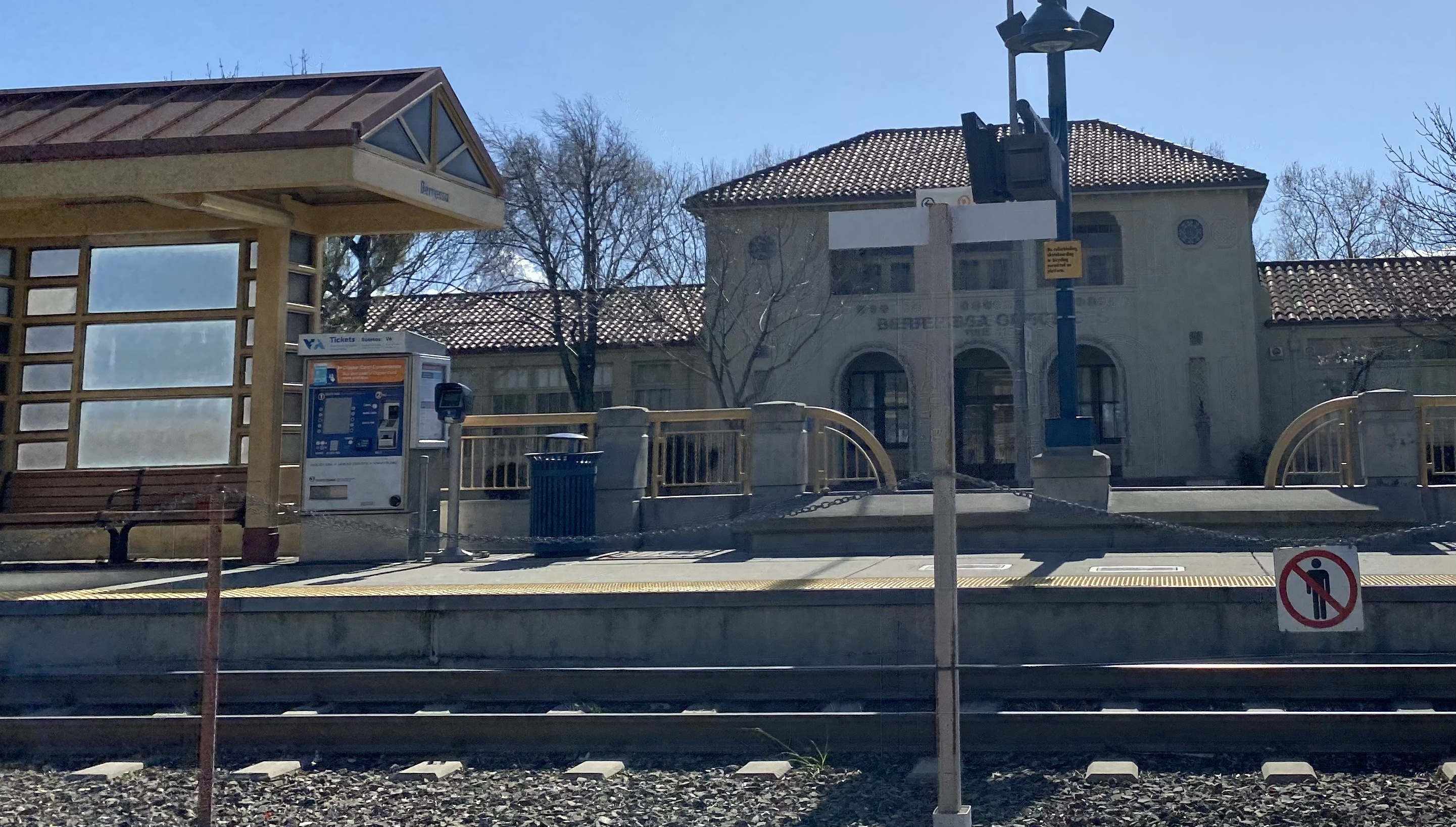
Berryessa light rail station.

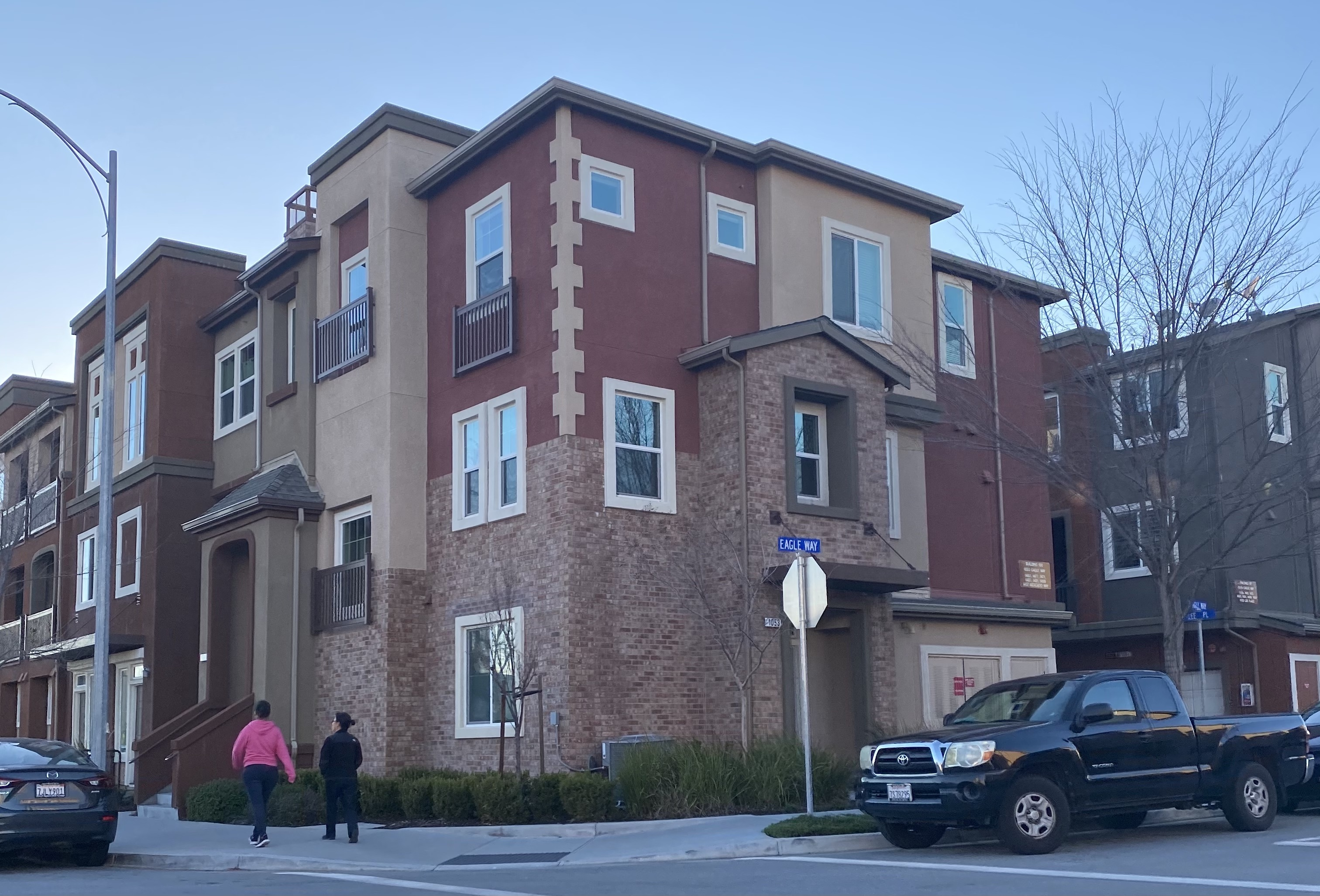
Town homes in Berryessa.

Berryessa Union School District operates public schools. Saint Victor Catholic School and Milpitas Christian School (founded in Milpitas but now located in Berryessa) are the only private schools in the area.

Public schools in Berryessa include:

=== High schools ===
- Independence High School (EUHSD)
- Piedmont Hills High School (EUHSD)

=== Middle schools ===
- Morrill Middle School
- Piedmont Middle School
- Sierramont Middle School

=== Elementary schools ===
- Brooktree Elementary School
- Cherrywood Elementary School
- Laneview Elementary School
- Majestic Way Elementary School
- Noble Elementary School
- Northwood Elementary School
- Ruskin Elementary School
- Summerdale Elementary School
- Toyon Elementary School
- Vinci Park Elementary School

== Gallery ==
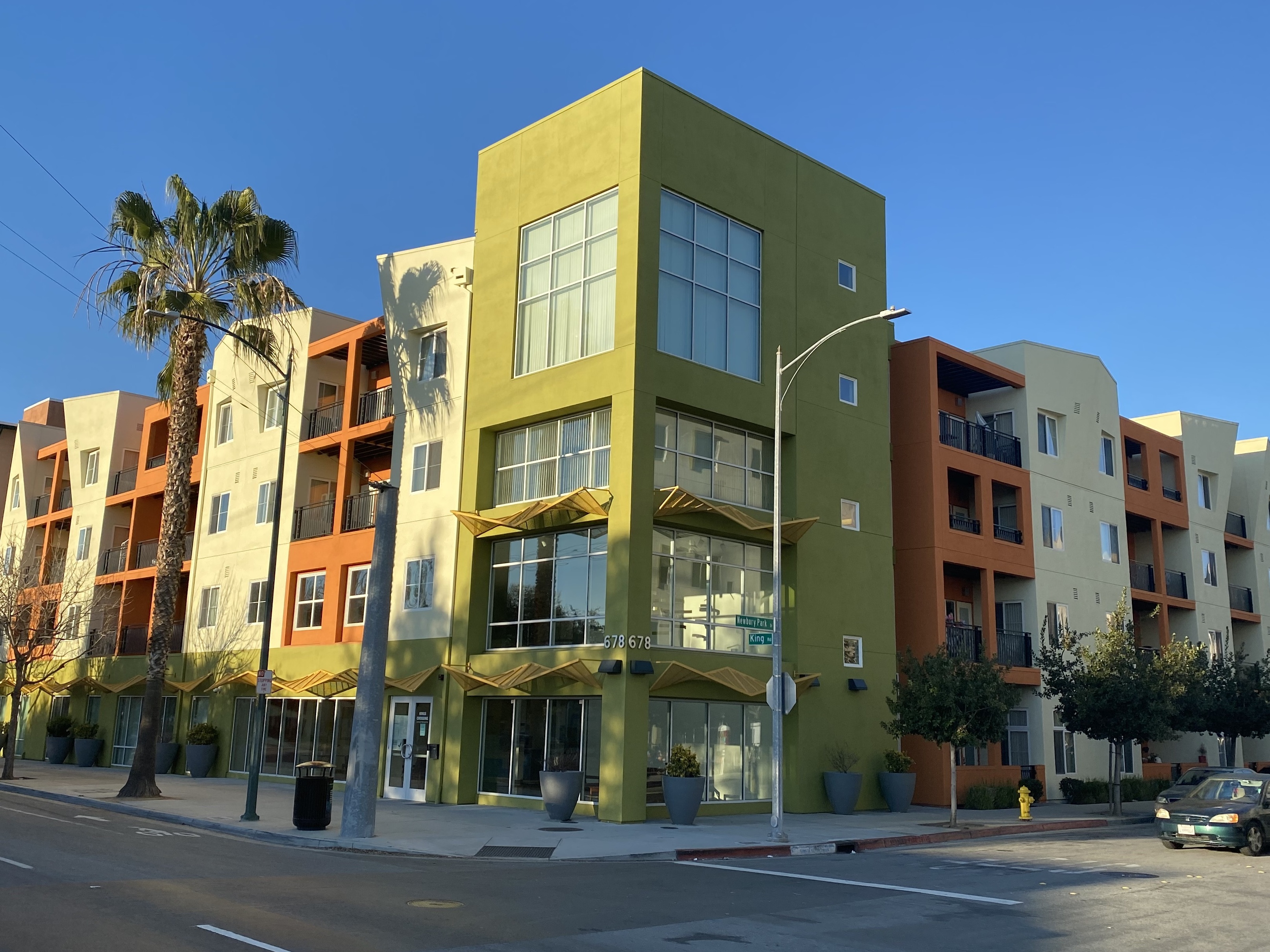
King's Crossing at Newbury Park

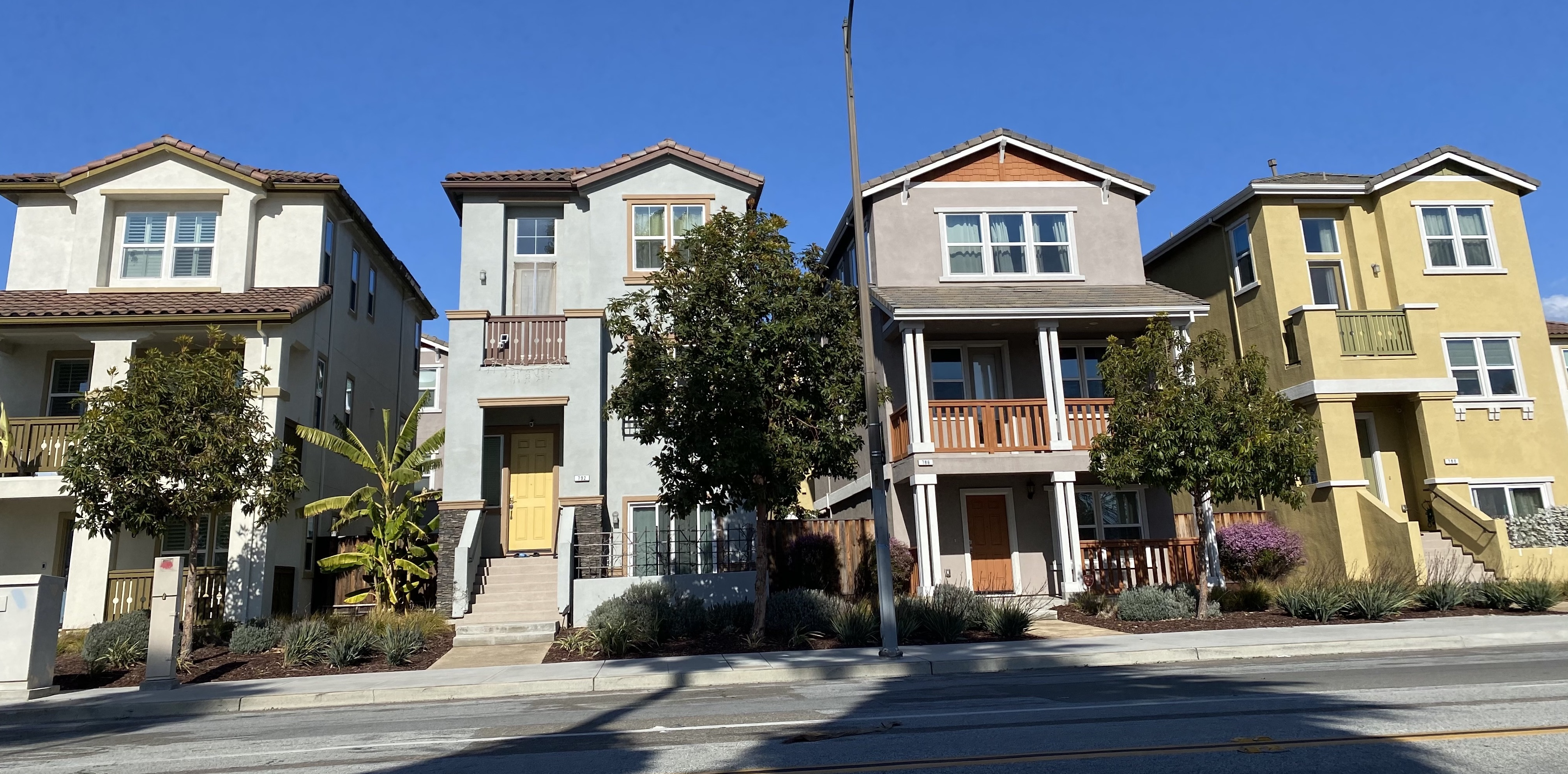
Townhomes on Mabury

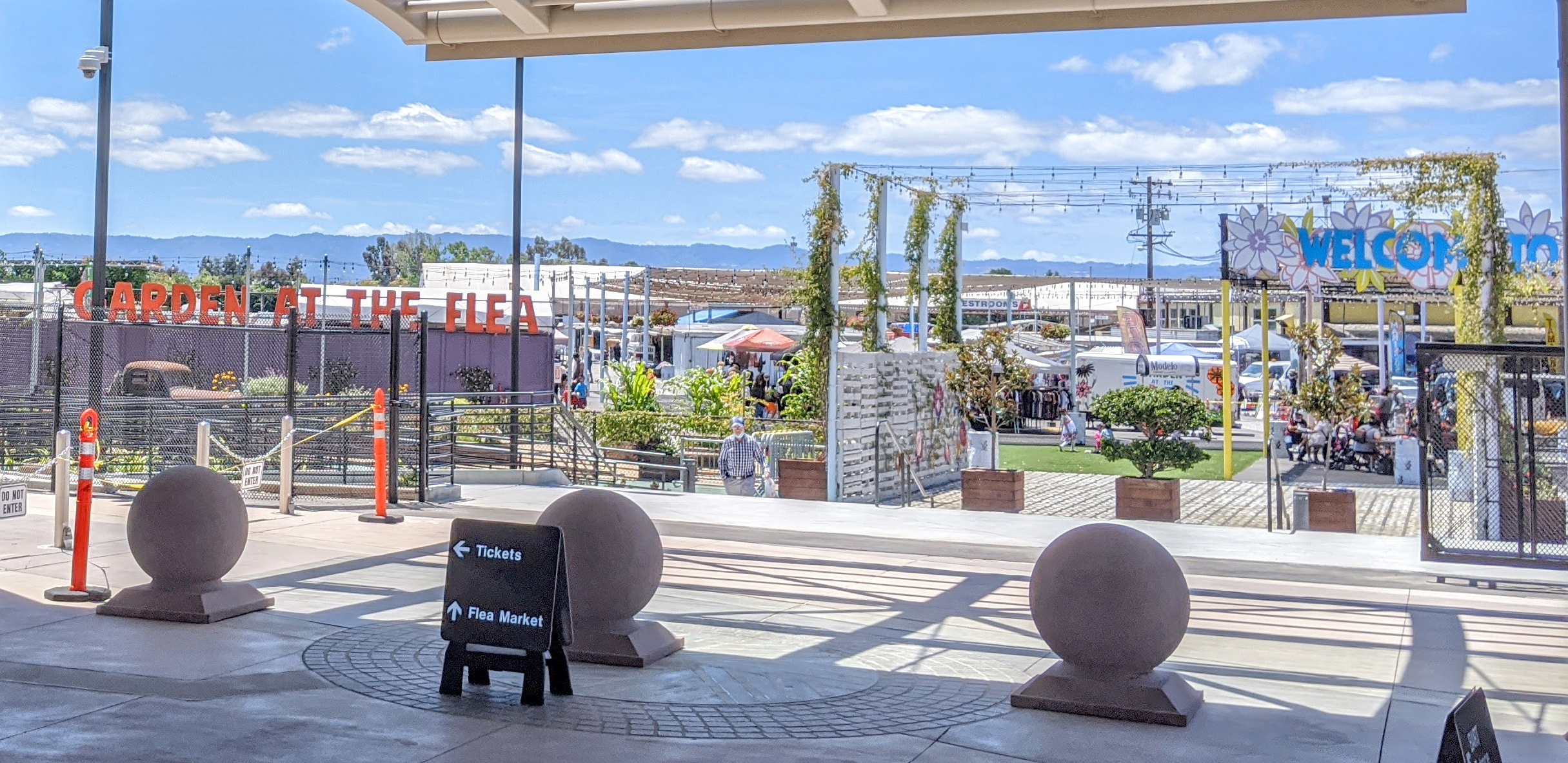
San Jose Flea Market

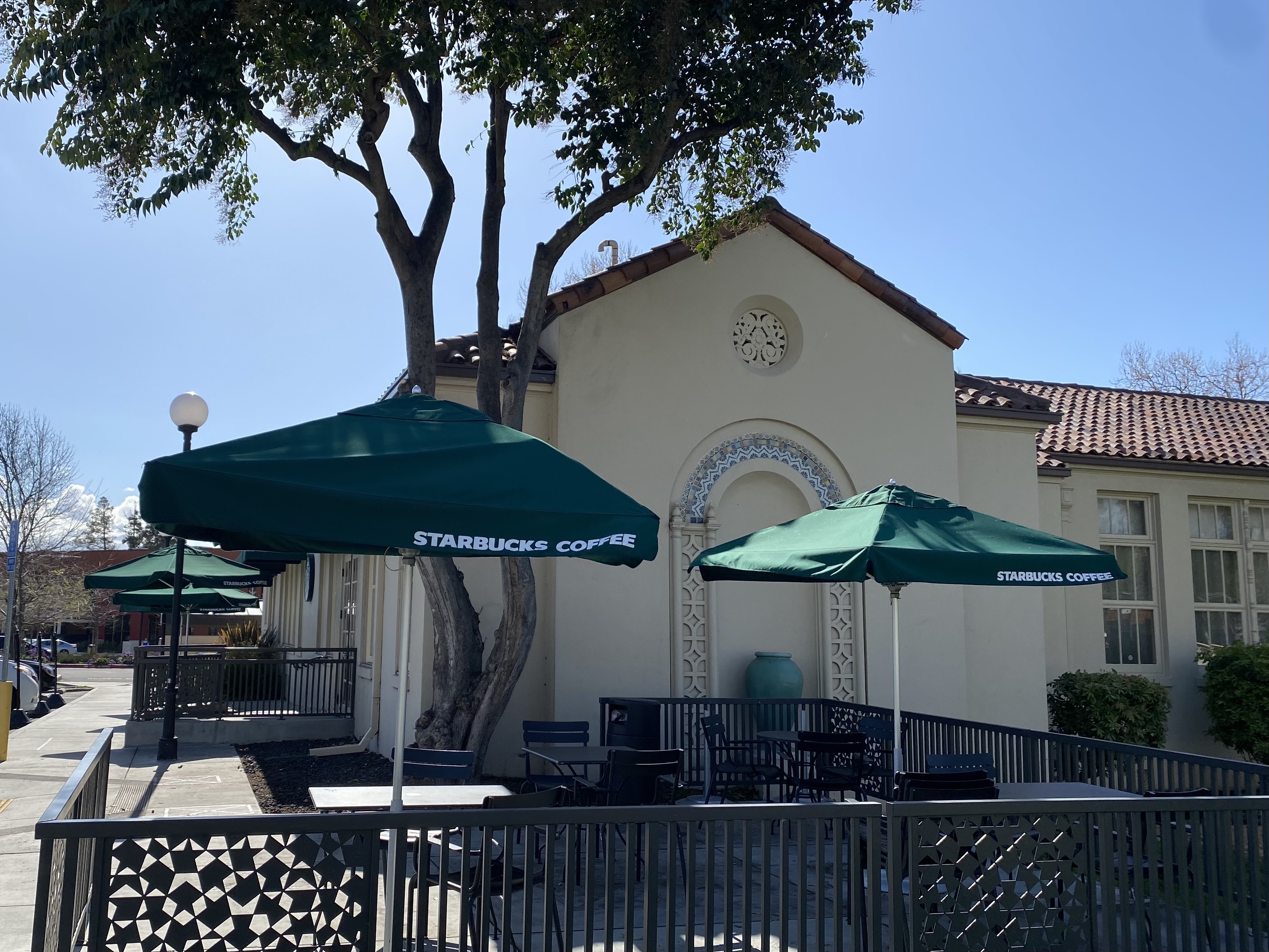
Café on N. Capitol Ave

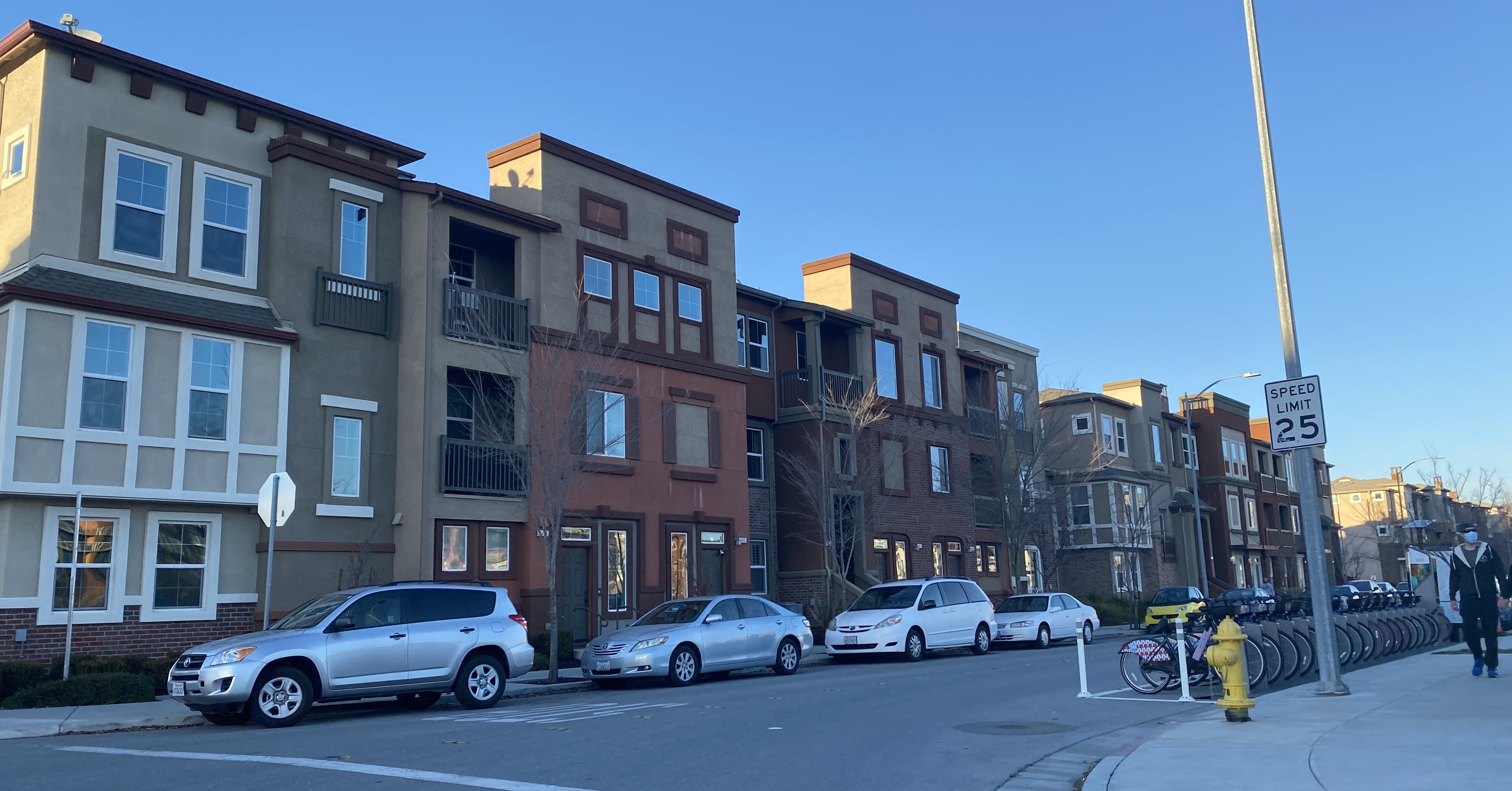
Townhomes on Mercado Way

== Notable residents ==
The following people either grew up in Berryessa or are current residents:

- Peanut Butter Wolf, DJ and music producer
- Chuck Reed, former mayor of San Jose
- Rex Walters, former NBA player and head basketball coach at USF from 2008 to 2016
- Jerry Yang, internet entrepreneur, venture capitalist, and co-founder of Yahoo!
