= Balance Rock, California =

Unincorporated community in California, United States

- Unincorporated community
- Location within California Location within the United States
- Coordinates: 35°48′22″N 118°39′07″W
- Country: United States
- State: California
- County: Tulare
- Elevation: 4,147 ft (1,264 m)
- Time zone: UTC-8 (Pacific (PST))
  - Summer (DST): UTC-7 (PDT)
- Area code: 559
- GNIS feature ID: 1660292

Balance Rock is an unincorporated community in Tulare County, California, United States. Balance Rock is 1.5 miles (2.4 km) east of Posey. The community was named after Balance Rock, a geographic feature in the area, by a Mrs. Shively in 1900. Balance Rock once had a post office, which operated from 1935 to 1950.
