= Bell Springs, California =

Unincorporated community in California, United States

Bell Springs
- Unincorporated community
- Location in California Bell Springs (the United States)
- Coordinates: 39°57′07″N 123°35′07″W
- Country: United States
- State: California
- County: Mendocino
- Elevation: 3,622 ft (1,104 m)

Bell Springs was a town and stage coach stop on Bell Springs Road in Mendocino County, California, United States. It was located 9 miles (14 km) northeast of Leggett, at an elevation of 3622 feet (1104 m).

A post office operated at Bell Springs from 1920 to 1961. The place was named in 1861 by Jim Graham for the cowbells he found at the site. What was once Bell Springs is now the location of the Bell Springs Ranch. Bell Springs Road, 28 miles of steep narrow unpaved mountain road, was originally called Mail Ridge, and was the only through road connecting Mendocino and Humboldt counties before Highway 101 was built.

== See also ==
- Northwestern Pacific Railroad
