= Buchli, California =

Unincorporated community in California, United States

Buchli
- unincorporated community
- Location in California Buchli (the United States)
- Coordinates: 38°12′54″N 122°19′58″W
- Country: United States
- State: California
- County: Napa
- Elevation: 16 ft (5 m)

Buchli is an unincorporated community in Napa County, California, United States. It lies at an elevation of 16 feet (5 m) between Los Carneros AVA and the Napa-Sonoma Marsh, along the Brazos subdivision of the railway owned by Sonoma–Marin Area Rail Transit.

== History ==
In 1897, J. M. Buchli sold a strip of land to the Northern Railway Company, which constructed a station there along the line between Napa Junction and Schellville. For the late 19th and early 20th centuries, the station was used to ship dairy, hay, and produce grown in Napa and Sonoma counties along the Southern Pacific Railroad to San Francisco. Beginning in 1905, a second line opened between Napa and Buchli, carrying passengers round trip daily to San Francisco via the ferry at Tiburon. Although this service had ended on August 20, 1911, the line was used for freight until the tracks were torn up in December, 1939.

In 1946, Press Wireless, Inc. constructed a radio station in Buchli which received and processed most news reports from East Asia. The station was the first in the Western United States to receive signals from Sputnik 1. After a corporate merger in 1966, the receiving equipment was relocated to Belmont. Leslie Salt purchased land to the south in the 1950s, which it developed into salt evaporation ponds. Starting in the 1970s, the California Department of Fish and Wildlife purchased much of the land around Buchli to set aside as a wildlife area.

As of 2019, the right of way on the rail line passing through Buchli is owned by Sonoma–Marin Area Rail Transit. The line still carries freight, and proposals have been made for an expansion of the SMART passenger service eastward along the line. Designs for reopening a station at Buchli as part of a wider infrastructure project in the Napa-Sonoma Marsh has also been proposed.

== Wildlife ==
The Huichica Creek unit of the Napa-Sonoma Marshes Wildlife Area, run by the California Department of Fish and Wildlife, is adjacent to Buchli. Hundreds of species of bird can be found in the various habitats, including the western meadowlark and burrowing owl in the grassland, the killdeer, clapper rail, and double-crested cormorant in the tidal flats and brackish ponds, and waterfowl such the bufflehead resting in deeper ponds depending on seasonal salinity.
