= Buena Vista, San Jose =

Coordinates: 37°19′17″N 121°55′00″W

Buena Vista, California
- Neighborhood of San Jose
- Location in Santa Clara County and the state of California
- Country: United States
- State: California
- Counties: Santa Clara

Area
  - Total: 0.1 sq mi (0.26 km^{2})
  - Land: 0.1 sq mi (0.26 km^{2})
  - Water: 0 sq mi (0 km^{2})

Population (2000)
  - Total: 1,704
  - Density: 17,040/sq mi (6,580/km^{2})
- Time zone: UTC-8 (PST)
  - Summer (DST): UTC-7 (PDT)
- Area codes: 408/669
- GNIS feature IDs: 1853379, 2407919

Buena Vista (Spanish for "Good View") is a former census-designated place (CDP) in Santa Clara County, California, United States. The population was 1,704 at the 2000 census. The area is now part of the city of San Jose.

== Geography ==
According to the United States Census Bureau, the CDP has a total area of 0.1 square miles (0.3 km^{2}), all of it land.

== Demographics ==
Historical population
Census	Pop.	Note	%±
2000	1,704		—
U.S. Decennial Census; 1860–1870 1880-1890; 1900 1910 1920; 1930 1940 1950; 1960 1970 1980; 1990 2000 2010

Buena Vista first appeared as a census designated place in the 2000 U.S. census. It was deleted prior to the 2010 U.S. census after being annexed to San Jose city.

=== 2000 ===
As of the census of 2000, there were 1,704 people, 539 households, and 321 families residing in the CDP. The population density was 24,099.1 inhabitants per square mile (9,304.7/km^{2}). There were 557 housing units at an average density of 7,877.5 per square mile (3,041.5/km^{2}). The racial makeup of the CDP was 45.36% White, 5.28% African American, 0.82% Native American, 3.46% Asian, 0.41% Pacific Islander, 38.38% from other races, and 6.28% from two or more races. Hispanic or Latino of any race were 65.90% of the population.

There were 539 households, out of which 38.4% had children under the age of 18 living with them, 34.1% were married couples living together, 17.6% had a female householder with no husband present, and 40.4% were non-families. 28.0% of all households were made up of individuals, and 4.8% had someone living alone who was 65 years of age or older. The average household size was 3.14 and the average family size was 3.83.

In the CDP, the population was spread out, with 30.0% under the age of 18, 12.0% from 18 to 24, 38.7% from 25 to 44, 15.5% from 45 to 64, and 3.8% who were 65 years of age or older. The median age was 29 years. For every 100 females, there were 114.3 males. For every 100 females age 18 and over, there were 114.4 males.

The median income for a household in the CDP was $30,449, and the median income for a family was $27,727. Males had a median income of $18,393 versus $21,940 for females. The per capita income for the CDP was $11,134. About 26.9% of families and 26.7% of the population were below the poverty line, including 30.7% of those under age 18 and none of those age 65 or over.
