= Belvedere Heights, Riverside, California =

Neighborhood of Riverside, California

Belvedere Heights
- Neighborhood of Riverside; Former unincorporated community
- Location in California
- Coordinates: 33°59′01″N 117°18′39″W
- Country: United States
- State: California
- County: Riverside County
- City: Riverside
- Elevation: 1,237 ft (377 m)

Belvedere Heights is a former unincorporated community now annexed to Riverside, California, in Riverside County, California. It lies at an elevation of 1237 feet (377 m). Belvedere Heights is located 3.5 miles (5.6 km) east of downtown Riverside. A sub-neighborhood of the broader University neighborhood, Belvedere Heights is in close proximity to the University of California, Riverside.

== Geography ==
Belvedere Heights occupies a series of hills and sloping terrain east of central Riverside. The area offers views of the Box Springs Mountains to the east and the Santa Ana River valley to the west. Its boundaries are loosely defined but generally correspond to the residential areas surrounding Belvedere Drive, Terrace Drive, and Floral Avenue within the University neighborhood. Much of the community lies on or near hillside lots, contributing to its distinctive topography and street layout.

== History ==
The community originated as an unincorporated settlement during Riverside County’s early 20th-century suburban expansion. As the city of Riverside grew eastward following World War II, Belvedere Heights was gradually annexed. The development of the University of California, Riverside in the 1950s and 1960s accelerated growth in nearby neighborhoods, including Belvedere Heights, which began to house students, faculty, and staff.

Throughout the late 20th century, the neighborhood evolved from a semi-rural enclave into a mixed suburban-university community. By the 1990s, most remaining unincorporated parcels had been absorbed into Riverside city limits.

== Land use and character ==
Belvedere Heights is primarily residential, featuring single-family homes, hillside dwellings, and occasional multi-family or student-oriented housing. Its proximity to UCR has influenced the housing market, leading to a mix of owner-occupied and rental properties. Commercial needs are largely served by nearby shopping centers such as University Village, which provides restaurants, entertainment, and essential services.

Open spaces and undeveloped parcels remain near the eastern edge of the neighborhood, transitioning toward the Box Springs foothills. The area is characterized by mature trees, curving streets, sweeping vistas, and varied architectural styles ranging from mid-century ranch homes to contemporary hillside residences.

== Demographics ==
Although no separate census data are collected for Belvedere Heights, the neighborhood is part of the census tracts encompassing the University area of Riverside. The population reflects the area’s university-adjacent character, with a mix of students, faculty, and long-term residents. Housing turnover tends to be higher than average due to the seasonal student population.

== Education ==
Belvedere Heights is served by the Riverside Unified School District, with nearby public schools including Highland Elementary School, University Heights Middle School, and Riverside STEM Academy. The UC Riverside campus lies southwest of the neighborhood, providing residents with access to academic and cultural resources.

== Transportation ==
The community is accessible via Watkins Drive, Blaine Street, and Canyon Crest Drive, connecting it to downtown Riverside and adjacent neighborhoods. Public transportation is provided by Riverside Transit Agency (RTA) routes serving the University area. Due to its hillside location, some streets are narrow or winding, and on-street parking is limited in steeper sections.

== Community and culture ==
As part of the University neighborhood, Belvedere Heights shares in Riverside’s efforts to promote pedestrian-oriented, mixed-use development near UCR. The area has a blend of longtime residents and students, fostering an eclectic and dynamic local culture. Community discussions describe Belvedere Heights as a quiet hillside enclave with convenient access to campus and city amenities, though aging infrastructure and parking remain ongoing concerns.

== See also ==
- Box Springs Mountains
- University of California, Riverside
