= Bull Creek, California =

Coordinates: 40°20′09″N 124°01′35″W

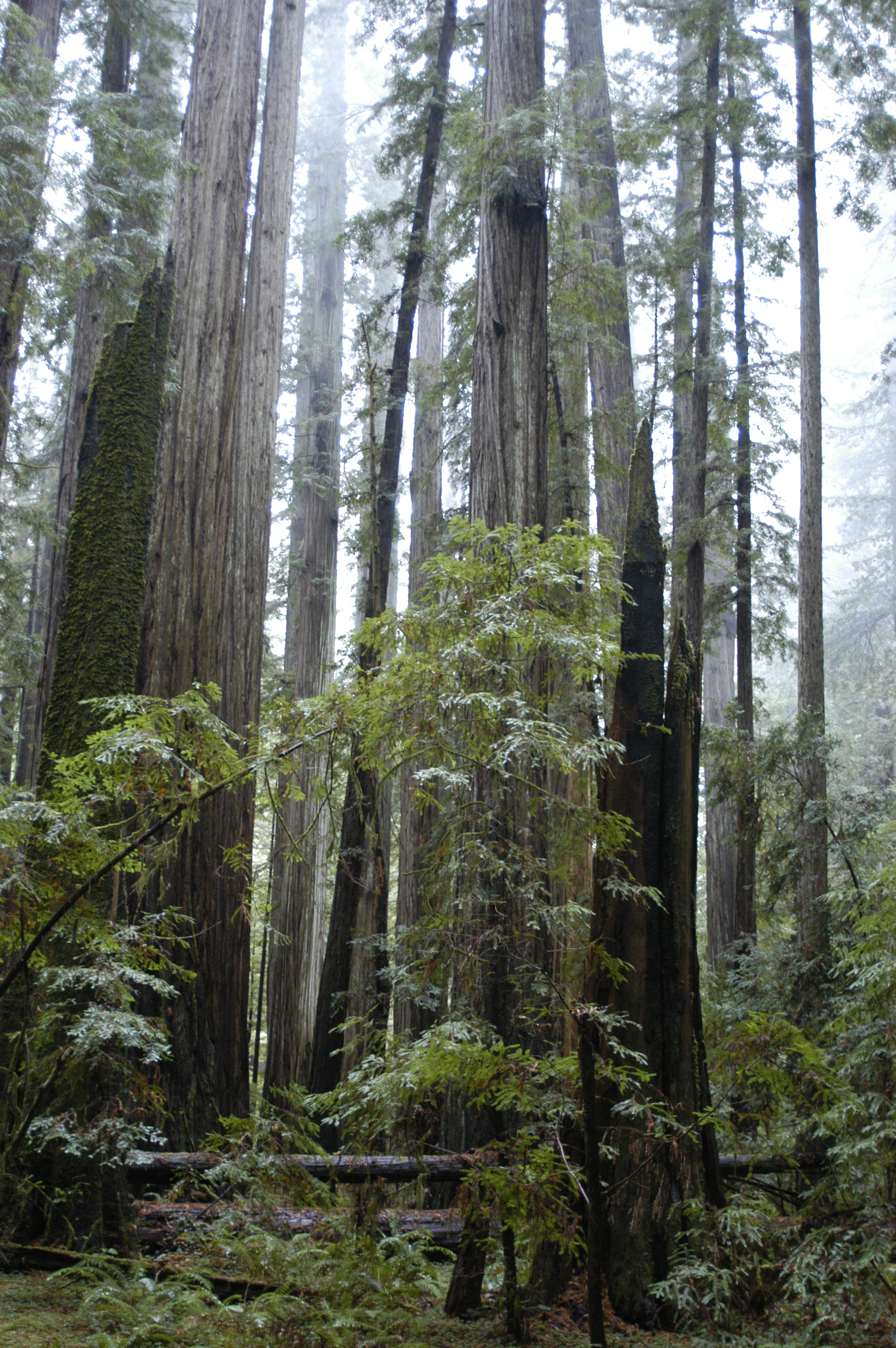
Rockefeller Grove at Bull Creek trail

Bull Creek (formerly, Bull Creek Settlement) is a locality 11 miles (18 km) south-southeast of Scotia, at an elevation of 7 feet (2.1 m) in Humboldt County, California. Bull Creek Road parallels Bull Creek and is also known as the Mattole Road.

== History ==
Members of the Eel River Athapaskan peoples, a group known as the Northern Sinkyone people, lived along the South Fork of the Eel River between Miranda and the confluence of the South Fork with the Eel River, and for a short distance on both sides of Dyerville. Their main village was at the confluence of the South Fork and Bull Creek.

The first written record of the area is in the Journal of George Gibbs who accompanied Indian agent Redick McKee's expedition in 1851. Gibbs remarked on a level prairie within redwoods described as being up to 52 feet (16 m) in diameter near the ground, that the language spoken by locals here was different than those they had contacted previously and described a redwood canoe.

The area was settled in the 1850s, but the large trees prevented anything but small-scale farming and logging until after the development of heavy equipment. The town of Bull Creek was located near the present day Albee Campground. Clearcutting the forest began in 1946 and between 1950 and 1959 over 10,000 acres of the forest burned in uncontrolled wildfires.

About three dozen homes washed away in the 1955 floods; coffins from the cemetery ended up in the redwood trees. Additionally the contents of the saw mill log deck, propane tanks, cars and other debris were washed into the creek and downstream. Gravel entrainment in the flood resulted in a county bridge being buried.

By 1960, almost 60 percent of the forest cover in the area had been clearcut, but no reforestation or erosion control had been put into place.

The Christmas flood of 1964 removed all the CCC buildings, mud and debris slides from clear cut slopes above Bull Creek resulted in massive damages for areas downstream. Almost 30 feet (9.1 m) of sand and gravel were deposited in the creek in this flood event, and the same bridge which was buried in 1955, was again covered in gravel. Over 850 large redwoods were washed into the flood. The channel, which in 1955 had been about 40 feet (12 m) wide had been enlarged by slope failure and erosional force to over 400 feet (120 m) in places.

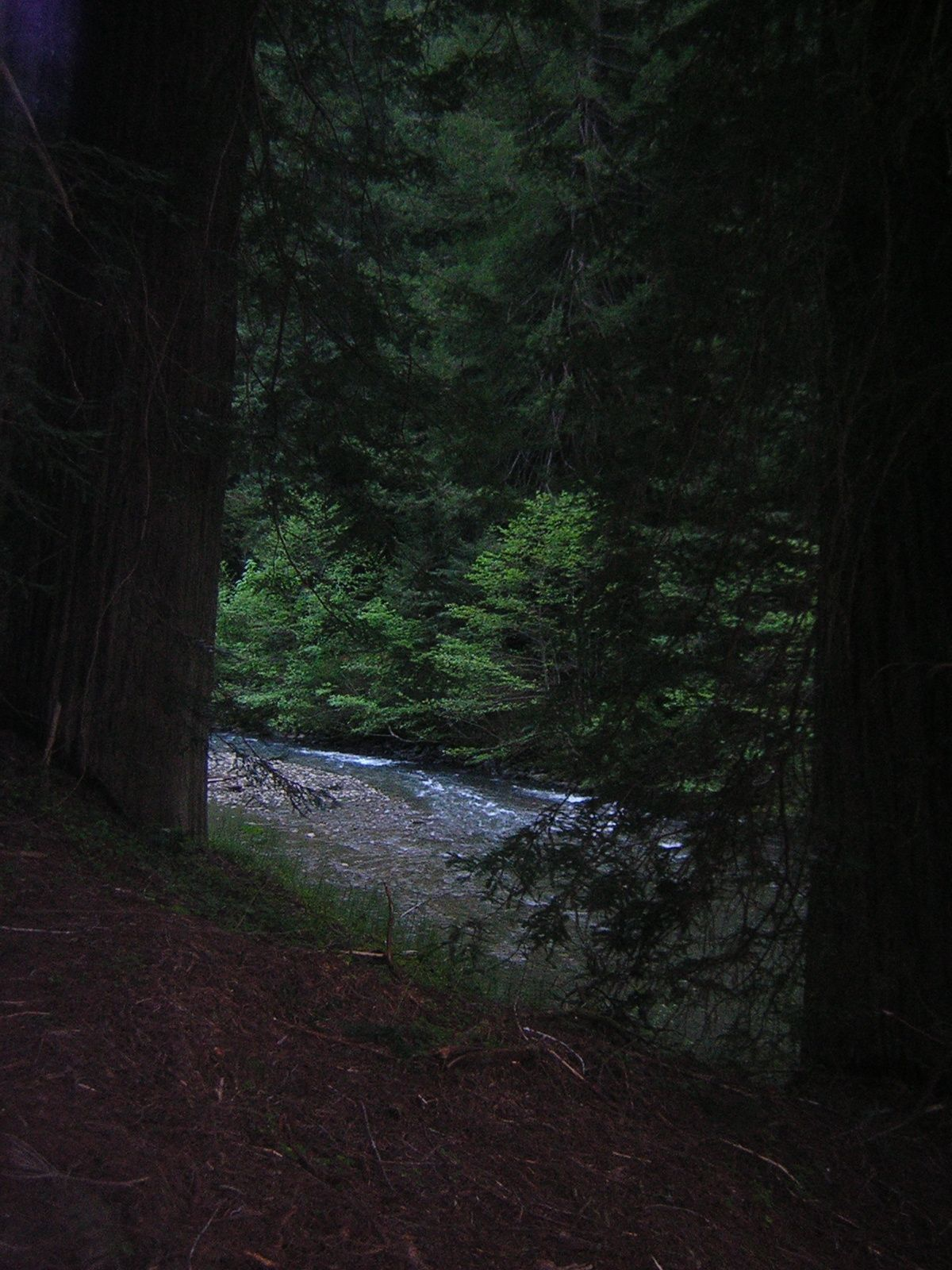
Bull Creek.

== Humboldt Redwoods State Park ==
In 1961, the logged over area was incorporated into the Humboldt Redwoods State Park boundaries. The redwoods along the alluvial flats on Bull Creek are some of the tallest trees in the world.

Bull Creek Flats/Rockefeller Forest Loop Trail is an Americans with Disabilities Act Accessible loop trail near the former Bull Creek town site and – for a while – follows the creek before turning into the redwoods.

The Humboldt Redwoods Marathon, a Boston Marathon qualification race, is held every year, the course includes the entire Bull Creek Road section of the Mattole Road.
