= Highway City, California =

Unincorporated community in California, United States

Highway City
- Unincorporated community
- Location in California Highway City (the United States)
- Coordinates: 36°48′39″N 119°53′06″W
- Country: United States
- State: California
- County: Fresno
- Named for: The Golden State Highway
- Elevation: 299 ft (91 m)

Highway City is an unincorporated community in Fresno County, California, United States. It is located 2.5 miles (4 km) southeast of Herndon, at an elevation of 299 feet (91 m).

A post office opened in Highway City in 1951.

A portion of the area has been incorporated into Fresno. It is located near the junction of State Route 99 and Shaw Avenue, one of the main streets of Fresno. The community was once known as Biola Junction and listed in the 1950 U.S. census as an unincorporated place with a population of 1,002. It was bisected by the realignment of US Route 99 which opened in 1960. The Highway City Community Center is located in a small public park just north of Shaw Avenue.

The name Highway City was first applied by fig grower J. C. Forkner and was used as a railroad shipping center for his Golden State Highway Fig Gardens concern.
