= List of high schools in California =

This is a list of high schools in California, public, private and chartered, organized by county and by city or school district. This list includes former high schools.

== Alameda County ==
=== Alameda Unified School District ===
- Alameda Community Learning Center
- Alameda High School
- Alameda Science and Technology Institute
- Encinal High School
- Island High School (continuation school)

=== Albany Unified School District ===
- Albany High School
- MacGregor High School (continuation)

=== Berkeley Unified School District ===
- Berkeley High School

=== Castro Valley Unified School District ===
- Castro Valley High School
- Redwood Alternative High School (continuation)

=== Dublin Unified School District ===
- Dublin High School
- Emerald High School

=== Emery Unified School District ===
- Emery Secondary School

=== Fremont Unified School District ===
- American High School
- Irvington High School
- John F. Kennedy High School
- Mission San Jose High School
- Washington High School

=== Hayward Unified School District ===
- Hayward High School
- Mount Eden High School
- Tennyson High School

=== Livermore Valley Joint Unified School District ===
- Granada High School
- Livermore High School

=== New Haven Unified School District ===
- Conley-Caraballo High School, Hayward
- James Logan High School, Union City

=== Newark Unified School District ===
- Newark Memorial High School

=== Oakland Unified School District ===
- Bay Area Technology School (charter school)
- Castlemont High School
- Fremont High School
- McClymonds High School
- Oakland High School
- Oakland International High School
- Oakland Military Institute (charter school)
- Oakland School for the Arts
- Oakland Technical High School
- Skyline High School
- University Preparatory Charter Academy

=== Piedmont Unified School District ===
- Millennium High School
- Piedmont High School

=== Pleasanton Unified School District ===
- Amador Valley High School
- Foothill High School
- Horizon High School
- Village High School

=== San Leandro Unified School District ===
- Lincoln High School (continuation)
- San Leandro High School

=== San Lorenzo Unified School District ===
- Arroyo High School
- San Lorenzo High School

=== Private schools ===
- Alameda Community Learning Center, Alameda
- Averroes High School, Fremont
- Bishop O'Dowd High School, Oakland
- The College Preparatory School, Oakland
- Head-Royce School, Oakland
- Holy Names High School, Oakland
- Maybeck High School, Berkeley
- Moreau Catholic High School, Hayward
- The Quarry Lane School, Dublin
- Roman Catholic Diocese of Oakland, various cities in the East Bay
- Russian Math Tutors, Silicon Valley
- St. Elizabeth High School, Oakland
- St. Joseph Notre Dame High School, Alameda
- St. Mary's College High School, Albany
- Valley Christian School, Dublin

== Alpine County ==
Alpine County has no formal high schools; Alpine County Unified School District operates Alpine County Opportunity School, an online program, and Alpine County Community Day School, an alternative program. Students often transfer to Douglas County School District in Nevada or Lake Tahoe Unified School District in El Dorado County for high school.

== Amador County ==
Amador County Unified School District

- Amador High School, Sutter Creek
- Argonaut High School, Jackson

== Butte County ==
=== Biggs Unified School District ===
- Biggs High School, Biggs

=== Chico Unified School District ===
- Chico High School, Chico
- Pleasant Valley High School, Chico

=== Durham Unified School District ===
- Durham High School, Durham

=== Gridley Unified School District ===
- Gridley High School, Gridley

=== Oroville Union High School District ===
- Las Plumas High School, Oroville
- Oroville High School, Oroville

=== Paradise Unified School District ===
- Paradise High School, Paradise

=== Private schools or continuation schools ===
- Esperanza High School, Gridley
- Fair View High School, Chico
- Prospect High School, Oroville
- Ridgeview High School, Magalia

== Calaveras County ==
- Arnold High School, Arnold
- Bret Harte Union High School, Angels Camp
- Calaveras High School, San Andreas

== Colusa County ==
- Colusa High School, Colusa
- Maxwell High School, Maxwell
- Pierce High School, Sudhir
- Williams High School, Williams

== Contra Costa County ==
=== Acalanes Union High School District ===
- Acalanes High School, Lafayette
- Campolindo High School, Moraga
- Las Lomas High School, Walnut Creek
- Miramonte High School, Orinda

=== Antioch Unified School District ===
- Antioch High School, Antioch
- Deer Valley High School, Antioch
- Dozier-Libbey Medical High School, Antioch

=== John Swett Unified School District ===
- John Swett High School, Crockett

=== Liberty Union High School District ===
- Freedom High School, Oakley
- Heritage High School, Brentwood
- Liberty High School, Brentwood

=== Martinez Unified School District ===
- Alhambra High School, Martinez

=== Mount Diablo Unified School District ===
- College Park High School, Pleasant Hill
- Concord High School, Concord
- Mount Diablo High School, Concord
- Northgate High School, Walnut Creek
- Ygnacio Valley High School, Concord

=== Pittsburg Unified School District ===
- Pittsburg High School, Pittsburg

=== San Ramon Valley Unified School District ===
- California High School, San Ramon
- Dougherty Valley High School, San Ramon
- Monte Vista High School, Danville
- San Ramon Valley High School, Danville

=== West Contra Costa Unified School District ===
- De Anza High School, Richmond
- El Cerrito High School, El Cerrito
- Hercules High School, Hercules
- Kennedy High School, Richmond
- Middle College High School (San Pablo), San Pablo
- Pinole Valley High School, Pinole
- Richmond High School, Richmond

=== Alternative or continuation schools ===
- Bidwell High School, Antioch
- Black Diamond High School, Pittsburg
- Del Amigo High School, Danville
- Independence High School, Brentwood
- La Paloma High School, Brentwood
- Live Oak High School, Antioch
- Prospects High School, Antioch
- Vicente Martinez High School, Martinez
- Vista High School, San Pablo
- Willow High School, Crockett

=== Private schools ===
- The Athenian School, Danville
- Berean Christian High School, Walnut Creek
- Carondelet High School, Concord
- Christ the King Catholic School, Pleasant Hill
- De La Salle High School, Concord
- Delta Christian Junior/Senior High School, Antioch
- El Sobrante Christian School, El Sobrante
- Holden High School, Orinda
- Orinda Academy, Orinda
- Pleasant Hill Adventist Academy, Pleasant Hill
- Salesian College Preparatory, Richmond

== Del Norte County ==
- Del Norte High School, Crescent City

== El Dorado County ==
=== Black Oak Mine Unified School District ===
- Golden Sierra High School, Garden Valley

=== El Dorado Union High School District ===
- El Dorado High School, Placerville
- Oak Ridge High School, El Dorado Hills
- Ponderosa High School, Shingle Springs
- Union Mine High School, El Dorado

=== Lake Tahoe Unified School District ===
- South Tahoe High School, South Lake Tahoe

=== Alternative or continuation schools ===
- Divide High School, Georgetown
- Independence Continuation, Diamond Springs
- Mt. Tallac High School, South Lake Tahoe

=== Private schools ===
- El Dorado Adventist School, Placerville
- Muir Charter School, Placerville
- Shenandoah High School, El Dorado
- Vista High School, Placerville

== Fresno County ==
=== Central Unified School District ===
- Central High School, Fresno
- Justin Garza High School, Fresno

=== Clovis Unified School District ===
- Buchanan High School, Clovis
- Clovis East High School, Clovis
- Clovis High School, Clovis
- Clovis North High School, Fresno
- Clovis West High School, Fresno

=== Coalinga-Huron Unified School District ===
- Coalinga High School, Coalinga

=== Firebaugh-Las Deltas Unified School District ===
- Firebaugh High School, Firebaugh

=== Fowler Unified School District ===
- Fowler High School, Fowler

=== Fresno Unified School District ===
- Bullard High School, Fresno
- The Center for Advanced Research and Technology
- Erma Duncan Polytechnical High School, Fresno
- Edison High School, Fresno
- Fresno High School, Fresno
- Herbert Hoover High School, Fresno
- McLane High School, Fresno
- Phoenix Secondary, Fresno
- Philip J. Patino High School of Entrepreneurship, Fresno
- Roosevelt High School, Fresno
- Sunnyside High School, Fresno
- University High School, Fresno

=== Golden Plains Unified School District ===
- Tranquillity High School, Tranquillity

=== Kerman Unified School District ===
- Kerman High School, Kerman

=== Kings Canyon Unified School District ===
- Orange Cove High School, Orange Cove
- Reedley High School, Reedley

=== Kingsburg Joint Union High School District ===
- Kingsburg High School, Kingsburg

=== Laton Joint Unified School District ===
- Laton High School, Laton

=== Mendota Unified School District ===
- Mendota High School, Mendota

=== Parlier Unified School District ===
- Parlier High School, Parlier

=== Riverdale Joint Unified School District ===
- Riverdale High School, Riverdale

=== Sanger Unified School District ===
- Sanger High School, Sanger
- Sanger West High School, Sanger

=== Selma Unified School District ===
- Selma High School, Selma

=== Sierra Unified School District ===
- Sierra High School, Tollhouse

=== Washington Unified School District ===
- Washington Union High School, Fresno

=== Alternative or continuation schools ===
- Cambridge High School, Coalinga
- Cambridge High School, Fresno
- Chestnut High School, Huron
- Design Science High School, Fresno
- Dewolf West High School, Fresno
- Easton High School, Fresno
- El Puente High School, Firebaugh
- Elm High School, Fresno
- Enterprise High School, Kerman
- Gateway High School, Clovis
- Heartland High School, Selma
- Horizon High School, Riverdale
- Kings Canyon High School, Dinuba
- Kings River High School, Sanger
- Oasis High School, Kingsburg
- Pershing High School, Fresno
- Rio Del Rey High School, Helm
- San Joaquin Valley High School, Parlier

=== Private schools ===
- Ambassador Phillip V. Sanchez Public Charter, Fresno (Sunnyside)
- Ambassador Phillip V. Sanchez Public Charter, Fresno (West Shaw)
- Ambassador Phillip V. Sanchez Public Charter, Mendota
- Ambassador Phillip V. Sanchez Public Charter, Parlier
- Carter G. Woodson Public Charter School, Fresno
- Caruthers High School, Caruthers
- Charter Academy of Ambassador Phillip V. Sanchez, Fresno
- Crescent View South Public Charter, Clovis
- Crescent View South Public Charter, Fresno
- Crescent View West Public Charter, Fresno
- Fresno Prep Academy, Fresno
- Immanuel High School, Reedley
- New Millennium Charter School, Fresno
- San Joaquin Memorial High School, Fresno
- School of Unlimited Learning, Fresno

== Glenn County ==
- Elk Creek Junior-Senior High School, Elk Creek
- Hamilton Union High School, Hamilton City
- Orland High School, Orland
- Princeton Junior-Senior High School, Princeton
- Willows High School, Willows

== Humboldt County ==
=== Eureka City Schools ===
- Eureka High School, Eureka

=== Ferndale Unified School District ===
- Ferndale High School, Ferndale

=== Fortuna Union High School District ===
- Fortuna Union High School, Fortuna

=== Klamath-Trinity Unified School District ===
- Hoopa Valley High School, Hoopa

=== Mattole Unified School District ===
- Mattole Triple Junction High School, Petrolia

=== Northern Humboldt Union High School District ===
- Arcata High School, Arcata
- McKinleyville High School, McKinleyville

=== Southern Humboldt Joint Unified School District ===
- South Fork High School, Miranda

=== Alternative or continuation schools ===
- Academy of the Redwoods, Fortuna
- Captain John Continuation High School, Hoopa
- East High School, Fortuna
- Mad River High School, McKinleyville
- Pacific Coast High School, Arcata
- Zoe Barnum High School, Eureka

=== Private schools ===
- Humboldt Bay High School, Eureka
- St. Bernard's High School, Eureka

== Imperial County ==
=== Brawley Union High School District ===
- Brawley Union High School, Brawley

=== Calexico Unified School District ===
- Calexico High School, Calexico

=== Calipatria Unified School District ===
- Calipatria High School, Calipatria

=== Central Union High School District ===
- Central Union High School, El Centro
- Southwest High School, El Centro

=== Coachella Valley Unified School District ===
- West Shores High School, Salton City

=== Holtville Unified School District ===
- Holtville High School, Holtville

=== Imperial Unified School District ===
- Imperial High School, Imperial

=== San Pasqual Valley Unified School District ===
- San Pasqual Valley High School, Winterhaven

=== Alternative or continuation schools ===
- Aurora High School, Calexico
- Bill M. Manes High School, Winterhaven
- De Anza High School, Calexico
- Desert Oasis High School, El Centro
- Desert Valley High School, Brawley
- Imperial Ave. Holbrook High School, Imperial
- Sam Webb Continuation, Holtville

=== Private schools ===
- North County High School, Brawley
- Vincent Memorial High School (Catholic), Calexico

== Inyo County ==
- Big Pine High School, Big Pine
- Bishop High School, Bishop
- Death Valley Academy, Shoshone
- Lone Pine High School, Lone Pine
- Owens Valley High School, Independence

== Kern County ==
=== Delano Joint Union High School District ===
- Cesar E. Chavez High School, Delano
- Delano High School, Delano
- Robert F. Kennedy High School, Delano

=== El Tejon Unified School District ===
- Frazier Mountain High School, Lebec

=== Kern High School District ===
- Arvin High School, Arvin
- Bakersfield High School, Bakersfield
- Centennial High School, Bakersfield
- Del Oro High School, Bakersfield
- East Bakersfield High School, Bakersfield
- Foothill High School, Bakersfield
- Frontier High School, Bakersfield
- Golden Valley High School, Bakersfield
- Highland High School, Bakersfield
- Independence High School, Bakersfield
- Kern Valley High School, Lake Isabella
- Kern Workforce 2000 Academy, Bakersfield
- Liberty High School, Bakersfield
- Mira Monte High School, Bakersfield
- North High School, Bakersfield
- Ridgeview High School, Bakersfield
- Shafter High School, Shafter
- South High School, Bakersfield
- Stockdale High School, Bakersfield
- West High School, Bakersfield

=== Maricopa Unified School District ===
- Maricopa High School, Maricopa

=== McFarland Unified School District ===
- McFarland High School, McFarland

=== Mojave Unified School District ===
- California City High School, California City
- Mojave High School, Mojave

=== Muroc Joint Unified School District ===
- Boron Junior-Senior High School, Boron
- Desert Junior/Senior High School, Edwards

=== Sierra Sands Unified School District ===
- Burroughs High School, Ridgecrest

=== Southern Kern Unified School District ===
- Rosamond High School, Rosamond

=== Taft Union High School District ===
- Taft Union High School, Taft

=== Tehachapi Unified School District ===
- Tehachapi High School, Tehachapi

=== Wasco Union High School District ===
- Wasco High School, Wasco

=== Alternative or continuation schools ===
- Buena Vista High School (continuation), Taft
- Central Valley High School, Bakersfield
- Mesquite High School, Ridgecrest
- Monroe High School, Tehachapi
- Nueva High School, Lamont
- Rare Earth High School, Rosamond
- San Joaquin High School, McFarland
- Tierra Del Sol High School, Bakersfield
- Valley High School, Delano
- Vista High School, Bakersfield
- Vista West High School, Bakersfield
- Wasco Independence High School, Wasco

=== Private schools ===
- Bakersfield Christian High School, Bakersfield
- Garces Memorial High School, Bakersfield

== Kings County ==
- Avenal High School, Avenal
- Corcoran High School, Corcoran
- Crescent Valley Public Charter, Hanford
- Hanford High School, Hanford
- Hanford West High School, Hanford
- Earl F. Johnson Continuation School, Hanford
- Kings Community School, Hanford
- Lemoore High School, Lemoore
- Lemoore Middle College High School, Lemoore
- Sierra Pacific High School, Hanford
- Armona Union Academy, Armona

== Lake County ==
- Clear Lake High School, Lakeport
- Intermountain High School, Cobb
- Kelseyville High School, Kelseyville
- Lower Lake High School, Lower Lake
- Middletown High School, Middletown
- Upper Lake High School, Upper Lake

== Lassen County ==
- Big Valley High School, Bieber
- Herlong High School, Herlong
- Lassen High School, Susanville
- Westwood High School, Westwood

== Madera County ==
- Chowchilla Union High School, Chowchilla
- Evergreen High School, Oakhurst
- Glacier High School Charter, Oakhurst
- Madera High School, Madera
- Madera South High School, Madera
- Minarets High School, O'Neals
- Mountain Oaks High School, North Fork
- Pioneer Technical Center, Madera
- Yosemite High School, Oakhurst

== Marin County ==
=== Novato Unified School District ===
- Novato High School, Novato
- San Marin High School, Novato

=== San Rafael City Schools ===
- San Rafael High School, San Rafael
- Terra Linda High School, San Rafael

=== Shoreline Unified School District ===
- Tomales High School, Tomales

=== Tamalpais Union High School District ===
- Archie Williams High School, San Anselmo
- Redwood High School, Larkspur
- Tamalpais High School, Mill Valley

=== Alternative or continuation schools ===
- Madrone High School, San Rafael
- Marin Oaks High School, Novato
- San Andreas High School, Larkspur
- Tamiscal High School, Larkspur

=== Private schools ===
- The Branson School, Ross
- Marin Academy, San Rafael
- Marin Catholic High School, Kentfield
- North Bay Christian Academy, Novato
- San Domenico School, San Anselmo

== Mariposa County ==
- Coulterville High School, Coulterville
- Mariposa County High School, Mariposa
- Yosemite Park High School, Yosemite

== Mendocino County ==
=== Anderson Valley Unified School District ===
- Anderson Valley Junior-Senior High School, Boonville

=== Fort Bragg Unified School District ===
- Fort Bragg High School, Fort Bragg

=== Laytonville Unified School District ===
- Laytonville High School, Laytonville

=== Leggett Valley Unified School District ===
- Leggett Valley High School, Leggett
- Whale Gulch High School, Whitethorn

=== Mendocino Unified School District ===
- Mendocino High School, Mendocino

=== Point Arena Joint Union High School District ===
- Point Arena High School, Point Arena

=== Potter Valley Community Unified School District ===
- Potter Valley High School, Potter Valley

=== Round Valley Unified School District ===
- Round Valley High School, Covelo

=== Ukiah Unified School District ===
- Ukiah High School, Ukiah

=== Willits Unified School District ===
- Willits High School, Willits

=== Alternative or continuation schools ===
- Centerville High School, Potter Valley
- Noyo High School, Fort Bragg
- Laytonville Continuation High School, Laytonville
- Mendocino Sunrise High School, Mendocino
- Rancheria Continuation, Boonville
- Round Valley Continuation, Covelo
- Sanhedrin High School, Willits
- South Coast High School, Point Arena
- South Valley High School, Ukiah

=== Private schools ===
- Developing Virtue Secondary School, Ukiah
- Pacific Community Charter High School, Point Arena
- Redwood Academy of Ukiah, Ukiah
- Willits Charter School, Willits
- Yokayo Valley Charter High School, Ukiah

== Merced County ==
=== Delhi Unified School District ===
- Delhi High School, Delhi

=== Dos Palos Oro Loma Joint Unified School District ===
- Dos Palos High School, Dos Palos

=== Gustine Unified School District ===
- Gustine High School, Gustine

=== Hilmar Unified School District ===
- Hilmar High School, Hilmar

=== Le Grand Union High School District ===
- Le Grand High School, Le Grand

=== Los Banos Unified School District ===
- Los Banos High School, Los Banos
- Pacheco High School, Los Banos

=== Merced Union High School District ===
- Atwater High School, Atwater
- Buhach Colony High School, Atwater
- El Capitan High School, Merced
- Golden Valley High School, Merced
- Livingston High School, Livingston
- Merced High School, Merced

=== Alternative or continuation schools ===
- Colony Basic Skills Alternative High School, Hilmar
- Granada High School, Le Grand
- Independence High School, Merced
- Irwin High School, Hilmar
- Pioneer High School, Gustine
- San Luis High School, Los Banos
- Sequoia High School, Merced
- Westside High School, South Dos Palos
- Yosemite High School, Merced

=== Private schools ===
- Stone Ridge Christian High School, Merced
- Valley High School, Atwater
- Valley High School, Los Banos
- Valley High School, Merced

== Modoc County ==
- Modoc High School, Alturas
- Surprise Valley High School, Cedarville
- Warner High School, Alturas

== Mono County ==
- Coleville High School, Coleville
- Eastern Sierra Academy, Bridgeport
- Lee Vining High School, Lee Vining
- Mammoth High School, Mammoth Lakes

== Monterey County ==
=== Carmel Unified School District ===
- Carmel High School, Carmel

=== Gonzales Unified School District ===
- Gonzales High School, Gonzales

=== Monterey Peninsula Unified School District ===
- Marina High School, Marina
- Monterey High School, Monterey
- Seaside High School, Seaside

=== North Monterey County Unified School District ===
- North Monterey County High School, Castroville

=== Pacific Grove Unified School District ===
- Pacific Grove High School, Pacific Grove

=== Salinas Union High School District ===
- Alisal High School, Salinas
- Everett Alvarez High School, Salinas
- North Salinas High School, Salinas
- Rancho San Juan High School, Salinas
- Salinas High School, Salinas

=== Soledad Unified School District ===
- Soledad High School, Soledad

=== South Monterey County Joint Union High School District ===
- Greenfield High School, Greenfield
- King City High School, King City

=== Alternative or continuation schools ===
- Carmel Valley High School, Carmel
- Central Coast High School, Seaside
- Pinnacles High School, Soledad
- Portola-Butler High School, King City
- Somavia High School, Gonazles

=== Private schools ===
- Notre Dame High School, Salinas
- Palma School, Salinas
- Santa Catalina School, Monterey
- Stevenson School, Pebble Beach
- Trinity Christian High School, Monterey
- York School, Monterey

== Napa County ==
=== Calistoga Joint Unified School District ===
- Calistoga High School, Calistoga

=== Napa Valley Unified School District ===
- American Canyon High School, American Canyon
- Napa High School, Napa
- Vintage High School, Napa

=== St. Helena Unified School District ===
- St. Helena High School, St. Helena

=== Alternative or continuation schools ===
- Legacy High School, American Canyon
- New Technology High School, Napa
- Palisades High School, Calistoga
- Valley Oak High School, Napa

=== Private schools ===
- Justin-Siena High School, Napa
- Pacific Union College Prep School, Angwin

== Nevada County ==
- Bear River High School, Grass Valley
- Bitney College Preparatory High School, Grass Valley
- Ghidotti Early College High School, Grass Valley
- Nevada Union High School, Grass Valley
- Sierra Mountain High School, Grass Valley
- Tahoe-Truckee High School, Truckee

== Placer County ==
=== Placer Union High School District ===
- Colfax High School, Colfax
- Del Oro High School, Loomis
- Foresthill High School, Foresthill
- Placer High School, Auburn

=== Rocklin Unified School District ===
- Rocklin High School, Rocklin
- Whitney High School, Rocklin

=== Roseville Joint Union High School District ===
- Antelope High School, Antelope
- Granite Bay High School, Granite Bay
- Oakmont High School, Roseville
- Roseville High School, Roseville
- West Park High School, Roseville
- Woodcreek High School, Roseville

=== Tahoe-Truckee Unified School District ===
- North Tahoe High School, Tahoe City

=== Western Placer Unified School District ===
- Lincoln High School, Lincoln

=== Alternative or continuation schools ===
- Adelante High School, Roseville
- Confluence High School, Auburn
- Independence High School, Roseville
- Victory High School, Rocklin

=== Private schools ===
- Forest Lake Christian High School, Auburn
- Horizon Charter School, Lincoln
- Pine Hills Adventist Academy, Auburn
- Sierra Christian High School, Rocklin
- Squaw Valley Academy, Squaw Valley
- Western Sierra Collegiate Academy, Rocklin

== Plumas County ==
- Chester High School, Chester
- Greenville Junior-Senior High School, Greenville
- Pine Hills Adventist School
- Portola High School, Portola
- Quincy High School, Quincy

== Riverside County ==
=== Alvord Unified School District ===
- Hillcrest High School, Riverside
- La Sierra High School, Riverside
- Norte Vista High School, Riverside

=== Banning Unified School District ===
- Banning High School, Banning

=== Beaumont Unified School District ===
- Beaumont High School, Beaumont

=== Coachella Valley Unified School District ===
- Coachella Valley High School, Thermal
- Desert Mirage High School, Thermal
- West Shores High School, Salton City/Mecca

=== Corona-Norco Unified School District ===
- Centennial High School, Corona
- Corona High School, Corona
- Eleanor Roosevelt High School, Eastvale
- John F. Kennedy Middle College High School, Norco
- Norco High School, Norco
- Santiago High School, Corona

=== Desert Sands Unified School District ===
- Indio High School, Indio
- La Quinta High School, La Quinta
- Palm Desert High School, Palm Desert
- Shadow Hills High School, Indio

=== Hemet Unified School District ===
- Hamilton High School, Anza
- Hemet High School, Hemet
- Tahquitz High School, Hemet
- West Valley High School, Hemet
- Western Center Academy, Hemet

=== Jurupa Unified School District ===
- Jurupa Valley High School, Jurupa Valley
- Patriot High School, Jurupa Valley
- Rubidoux High School, Jurupa Valley

=== Lake Elsinore Unified School District ===
- Elsinore High School, Wildomar
- Lakeside High School, Lake Elsinore
- Temescal Canyon High School, Lake Elsinore

=== Moreno Valley Unified School District ===
- Canyon Springs High School, Moreno Valley
- Moreno Valley High School, Moreno Valley
- Valley View High School, Moreno Valley
- Vista del Lago High School, Moreno Valley

=== Murrieta Valley Unified School District ===
- Murrieta Mesa High School, Murrieta
- Murrieta Valley High School, Murrieta
- Vista Murrieta High School, Murrieta

=== Palm Springs Unified School District ===
- Cathedral City High School, Cathedral City
- Desert Hot Springs High School, Desert Hot Springs
- Palm Springs High School, Palm Springs
- Rancho Mirage High School, Rancho Mirage

=== Palo Verde Unified School District ===
- Palo Verde Valley High School, Blythe

=== Perris Union High School District ===
- Heritage High School, Menifee
- Liberty High School, Menifee
- Paloma Valley High School, Menifee
- Perris High School, Perris

=== Riverside Unified School District ===
- Arlington High School, Riverside
- John W. North High School, Riverside
- Martin Luther King Jr. High School, Riverside
- Ramona High School, Riverside
- Polytechnic High School, Riverside

=== San Jacinto Unified School District ===
- San Jacinto Senior High School, San Jacinto

=== Temecula Valley Unified School District ===
- Chaparral High School, Temecula
- Great Oak High School, Temecula
- Temecula Valley High School, Temecula

=== Val Verde Unified School District ===
- Citrus Hill High School, Perris
- Orange Vista High School, Perris
- Rancho Verde High School, Moreno Valley

=== Alternative or continuation schools ===
- Abraham Lincoln High School, Riverside
- Alvord High School, Riverside
- Amistad High School, Indio
- Horizon School of Independent Studies, La Quinta
- La Familia High School, Thermal
- Lee Pollard High School, Corona
- March Mountain High School, Moreno Valley
- Mount San Jacinto High School, Cathedral City
- Nueva Vista Continuation High School, Riverside
- Orange Grove High School, Corona
- Ortega High School, Lake Elsinore
- Perris Lake High School, Perris
- Raincross High School, Riverside
- Rancho Vista High School, Temecula
- Summit High School (independent studies), La Quinta
- Summit View High School, Riverside
- Sunnymead High School, Moreno Valley
- Susan H. Nelson High School, Temecula
- Twin Palms High School, Blythe
- Val Verde High School, Perris

=== Private schools ===
- California Lutheran Academy, Wildomar
- Calvary Chapel Christian School, Murrieta
- Christian School of the Desert, Bermuda Dunes
- Desert Adventist Academy, Desert Hot Springs
- Desert Chapel High School, Palm Springs
- Eagle Mountain (K-12) School, Desert Center
- Grace Chapel of the Desert School, Indio
- Idyllwild Arts Academy, Idyllwild
- La Sierra Adventist Academy, Riverside
- Linfield Christian School, Temecula
- Mater Dei High School, Mecca
- Mesa Grande Academy, Calimesa
- Mojave Desert (Mission Creek) Military Academy, Desert Hot Springs
- Notre Dame Catholic High School, Riverside
- Nuview Bridge Academy, Nuevo
- Palm Valley High School (private), Rancho Mirage
- Quadrille Academy, Indio
- Rancho Christian School, Temecula
- River Springs Charter School, County wide charter school
- San Gorgonio (K-12) School, Cabazon
- Seaview High School, Thermal/Mecca
- Sherman Indian High School, Riverside
- Southwest Educational Center, Wildomar
- Temecula Preparatory School, French Valley
- The Ranch Academy, 1000 Palms
- Vista Calimesa High School, Calimesa/Yucaipa
- Woodcrest Christian School, Riverside
- Xavier College Preparatory (Catholic), Palm Desert

== Sacramento County ==
=== Center Unified School District ===
- Center High School, Antelope

=== Elk Grove Unified School District ===
- Cosumnes Oaks High School, Elk Grove
- Elk Grove Charter School, Elk Grove
- Elk Grove High School, Elk Grove
- Florin High School, South Sacramento
- Franklin High School, Elk Grove
- Laguna Creek High School, Elk Grove
- Monterey Trail High School, Elk Grove
- Pleasant Grove High School, Elk Grove
- Sheldon High School, Sacramento
- Valley High School, South Sacramento

=== Folsom Cordova Unified School District ===
- Cordova High School, Rancho Cordova
- Folsom High School, Folsom
- Vista del Lago High School, Folsom

=== Galt Joint Union High School District ===
- Galt High School, Galt
- Liberty Ranch High School, Galt

=== Natomas Unified School District ===
- Inderkum High School, Sacramento
- Natomas Charter School, Sacramento
- Natomas High School, Sacramento
- Westlake Charter High School, Sacramento

=== River Delta Unified School District ===
- Delta High School, Clarksburg
- Rio Vista High School, Rio Vista

=== Sacramento City Unified School District ===
- American Legion High School, Central Sacramento
- Arthur A. Benjamin Health Professions High School, Sacramento
- C.K. McClatchy High School, Sacramento
- George Washington Carver School of Arts and Science, Sacramento
- Hiram W. Johnson High School, Sacramento
- John F. Kennedy High School, South Sacramento
- Luther Burbank High School, Sacramento
- The Met Sacramento High School, Sacramento
- Rosemont High School, Sacramento
- Sacramento Accelerated Academy High School, Sacramento
- Sacramento High School, Sacramento
- Sacramento New Technology High School, Sacramento
- School of Engineering and Sciences, Sacramento
- West Campus High School, West Sacramento

=== San Juan Unified School District ===
- Bella Vista High School, Fair Oaks
- Casa Roble High School, Orangevale
- Del Campo High School, Fair Oaks
- El Camino Fundamental High School, Arden-Arcade
- Encina High School, Arden-Arcade
- Mesa Verde High School, Citrus Heights
- Mira Loma High School, Arden-Arcade
- Rio Americano High School, Arden-Arcade
- San Juan High School, Citrus Heights

=== Twin Rivers Unified School District ===
- Foothill High School, Sacramento
- Grant Union High School, North Sacramento
- Highlands High School, North Highlands
- Rio Linda High School, Rio Linda

=== Alternative or continuation schools ===
- Calvine High School, Sacramento
- Discovery High School, Sacramento
- Estrellita High School, Galt
- Kinney High School, Rancho Cordova
- Las Flores High School, Sacramento
- McClellan High School, Antelope
- Mokelumne High School, Courtland
- Rio Cazadero High School, Sacramento
- William Daylor High School, Sacramento

=== Private schools ===
- Christian Brothers High School, Central Sacramento
- East Anthwood Angles High School, East Sacramento
- East Side High School, East Sacramento
- Franklin D. Roosevelt School, Sacramento
- Golden Valley Charter School
- Jane Lathrop School, Carmichael
- Jesuit High School of Sacramento, Carmichael
- K. Robinson Anthwood Continuation High School, East Sacramento
- Lexington Union High School, Central Sacramento
- Loretto High School, Sacramento
- Lutheran School, Sacramento
- River Valley School, Sacramento
- Rochester High School, East Sacramento
- Sacramento Adventist Academy, Sacramento
- Sacramento Country Day School, Sacramento
- Sacramento Preparatory Academy, Sacramento
- Sacramento Valley School, Sacramento
- Sacramento Waldorf School, Fair Oaks
- St. Francis High School, Sacramento
- Tahaloma High School, Citrus Heights
- Upper Valley High School, East Sacramento
- Valley Oak Academy - Mariposa, Citrus Heights
- Victory Christian High School, Carmichael
- Vista Nueva Career & Technology High School, Sacramento
- West Heights High School, West Sacramento
- Wizbin High School, East Sacramento

== San Benito County ==
- Anzar High School, San Juan Bautista
- San Benito High School, Hollister

== San Bernardino County ==
=== Apple Valley Unified School District ===
- Apple Valley High School, Apple Valley
- Granite Hills High School, Apple Valley

=== Barstow Unified School District ===
- Barstow High School, Barstow

=== Bear Valley Unified School District ===
- Big Bear High School, Big Bear City

=== Chaffey Joint Union High School District ===
- Alta Loma High School, Rancho Cucamonga
- Chaffey High School, Ontario
- Colony High School, Ontario
- Etiwanda High School, Rancho Cucamonga
- Los Osos High School, Rancho Cucamonga
- Montclair High School, Montclair
- Ontario High School, Ontario
- Rancho Cucamonga High School, Rancho Cucamonga

=== Chino Valley Unified School District ===
- Chino High School, Chino
- Chino Hills High School, Chino Hills
- Don Antonio Lugo High School, Chino
- Ruben S. Ayala High School, Chino Hills

=== Colton Joint Unified School District ===
- Bloomington High School, Bloomington
- Colton High School, Colton
- Grand Terrace High School, Grand Terrace

=== Fontana Unified School District ===
- A. B. Miller High School, Fontana
- Fontana High School, Fontana
- Henry J. Kaiser High School, Fontana
- Jurupa Hills High School, Fontana
- Summit High School, Fontana

=== Hesperia Unified School District ===
- Hesperia High School, Hesperia
- Oak Hills High School, Oak Hills
- Sultana High School, Hesperia

=== Morongo Unified School District ===
- Twentynine Palms High School, Twentynine Palms
- Yucca Valley High School, Yucca Valley

=== Needles Unified School District ===
- Needles High School, Needles

=== Redlands Unified School District ===
- The Grove School, Redlands
- Citrus Valley High School, Redlands
- Redlands East Valley High School, Redlands
- Redlands High School, Redlands

=== Rialto Unified School District ===
- Dwight D. Eisenhower High School, Rialto
- Rialto High School, Rialto
- Wilmer Amina Carter High School, Rialto

=== Rim of the World Unified School District ===
- Rim of the World High School, Lake Arrowhead

=== San Bernardino City Unified School District ===
- Arroyo Valley High School, San Bernardino
- Cajon High School, San Bernardino
- Indian Springs High School, San Bernardino
- Pacific High School, San Bernardino
- San Bernardino High School, San Bernardino
- San Gorgonio High School, San Bernardino

=== Silver Valley Unified School District ===
- Silver Valley High School, Yermo

=== Snowline Joint Unified School District ===
- Serrano High School, Phelan

=== Upland Unified School District ===
- Upland High School, Upland

=== Victor Valley Union High School District ===
- Adelanto High School, Adelanto
- Cobalt Institute of Math & Science, Victorville
- Lakeview Leadership Academy, Victorville
- Silverado High School, Victorville
- University Preparatory School, Victorville
- Victor Valley High School, Victorville

=== Yucaipa-Calimesa Joint Unified School District ===
- Yucaipa High School, Yucaipa

=== Alternative or continuation schools ===
- Big Bear STEM School, Big Bear City
- Black Rock High School, Joshua Tree
- Boys Republic High School, Chino Hills
- Buena Vista Continuation High School, Chino
- Calico Continuation High School, Yermo
- Canyon Ridge High School, Hesperia
- Canyon View High School, Ontario
- Central High Continuation School, Barstow
- Chaparral High School, Phelan
- Chautauqua High School, Big Bear City
- Citrus High School, Fontana
- Doctor John H. Milor High School, Rialto
- Eric Birch High School, Fontana
- Goodwill High School, Victorville
- Green Valley High School, Yucaipa
- Hillside High School, Upland
- Mountain High School, Lake Arrowhead
- Mojave Desert Public School, Amboy
- Mojave High School, Hesperia
  - Orangewood Contintuation High School, Redlands
- San Andreas High School, San Bernardino
- Sierra High School, San Bernardino
- Slover Mountain High School, Colton
- Valley View High School, Ontario
- Washington Alternative High School, Colton
- Zupanic High School, Rialto

=== Private schools ===
- Alta Vista Public Charter, Adelanto
- Alta Vista Public Charter, Apple Valley
- Alta Vista Public Charter, Hesperia
- Alta Vista Public Charter, San Bernardino
- Alta Vista South Public Charter, Highland
- Aquinas Catholic High School, San Bernardino
- Arrowhead Christian Academy, Redlands
- Big River School, Big River (county)
- Bloomington Christian School, Big Bear Lake
- Bloomington Christian School, Bloomington
- Crestline High School, Crestline
- Desert Sands Charter High School, Fontana
- Desert Sands Charter High School, Rialto
- Grace Chapel of the Desert School, Yucca Valley
- Loma Linda Academy, Loma Linda
- Mesa Grande Academy, Calimesa/Yucaipa
- Mojave Desert (Morongo Basin) Military Academy, Yucca Valley
- Riverside Prep, Oro Grande
- (Seventh-Day) Adventist Academy, Yucca Valley/Twentynine Palms
- (Seventh-Day) Adventist Academy, Yucaipa/Calimesa
- Upland Christian Academy, Rancho Cucamonga
- Xavier College Preparatory High School, Palm Desert

== San Francisco County ==
=== Public ===
- Abraham Lincoln High School
- Academy of Arts & Sciences
- Balboa High School
- Downtown High School
- Galileo Academy of Science and Technology
- George Washington High School
- Ida B. Wells Continuation High School
- Independence High School
- International Studies Academy
- John A. O'Connell High School
- June Jordan School for Equity
- Lowell High School
- Mission High School
- Phillip & Sala Burton High School
- Raoul Wallenberg Traditional High School
- San Francisco Flex Academy
- San Francisco International High School
- School of the Arts (SOTA)
- Thurgood Marshall Academic High School

=== Public charter ===
- City Arts & Technology
- Gateway High School
- KIPP San Francisco College Preparatory
- Leadership High School

=== Private schools ===
- The Bay School of San Francisco
- Drew School
- Fusion Academy
- International High School of San Francisco
- Jewish Community High School of the Bay
- Lick-Wilmerding High School
- Lycée Français La Pérouse
- Proof School
- Saint John of San Francisco Orthodox Academy
- San Francisco Christian
- San Francisco University High School
- San Francisco Waldorf High School
- The Urban School of San Francisco
- Woodside International School
- Youth Chance High School

=== Catholic ===
- Archbishop Riordan High School
- Convent of the Sacred Heart High School
- Immaculate Conception Academy
- Sacred Heart Cathedral Preparatory
- St. Ignatius College Preparatory
- Stuart Hall High School

== San Joaquin County ==
=== Escalon Unified School District ===
- Escalon High School, Escalon

=== Lammersville Joint Unified School District ===
- Mountain House High School, Mountain House

=== Lincoln Unified School District ===
- Lincoln High School, Stockton

=== Linden Unified School District ===
- Linden High School, Linden

=== Lodi Unified School District ===
- Bear Creek High School, Stockton
- Lodi High School, Lodi
- Middle College High School, Stockton
- Ronald E. McNair High School, Stockton
- Tokay High School, Lodi

=== Manteca Unified School District ===
- East Union High School, Manteca
- Lathrop High School, Lathrop
- Manteca High School, Manteca
- Sierra High School, Manteca
- Weston Ranch High School, Stockton

=== Ripon Unified School District ===
- Ripon High School, Ripon

=== Stockton Unified School District ===
- Cesar Chavez High School, Stockton
- Edison High School, Stockton
- Franklin High School, Stockton
- Health Careers Academy, Stockton
- Pacific Law Academy, Stockton
- Stagg High School, Stockton
- Stockton Early College Academy, Stockton
- Weber Institute of Applied Sciences and Technology, Stockton

=== Tracy Unified School District ===
- John C. Kimball High School, Tracy
- Merrill F. West High School, Tracy
- Tracy High School, Tracy

=== Alternative or continuation schools ===
- Calla High School, Manteca
- Duncan-Russell Continuation, Tracy
- George and Evelyn Stein Continuation, Tracy
- Harvest High School, Ripon
- Jane Frederick High School, Stockton
- Liberty High School, Lodi
- New Vision Alternative High School, Stockton
- Plaza Robles Continuation High, Stockton
- Pride Continuation, Linden
- Village Oaks High School, Stockton
- Vista High School, Escalon

=== Private schools ===
- Edward C. Merlo Institute of Environmental Studies, Stockton
- Lodi Academy, Lodi
- Manteca Day School, Manteca
- St. Mary's High School, Stockton

== San Luis Obispo County ==
=== Atascadero Unified School District ===
- Atascadero High School, Atascadero

=== Coast Unified School District ===
- Coast Union High School, Cambria

=== Lucia Mar Unified School District ===
- Arroyo Grande High School, Arroyo Grande
- Central Coast New Tech High School, Nipomo
- Nipomo High School, Nipomo

=== Paso Robles Joint Unified School District ===
- Paso Robles High School, Paso Robles

=== San Luis Coastal Unified School District ===
- Morro Bay High School, Morro Bay
- San Luis Obispo High School, San Luis Obispo

=== Shandon Joint Unified School District ===
- Shandon High/Middle School, Shandon

=== Templeton Unified School District ===
- Templeton High School, Templeton

=== Alternative or continuation schools ===
- Eagle Canyon High School, Templeton
- Independence High School, Paso Robles
- Leffingwell Continuation High School, Cambria
- Liberty High School, Paso Robles
- Lopez High School, Arroyo Grande
- Pacific Beach High School, San Luis Obispo
- Paloma Creek High School, Atascadero

=== Private schools ===
- Grizzly Challenge Charter School, San Luis Obispo
- Mission College Preparatory, San Luis Obispo
- North County Christian High School, Atascadero
- San Luis Obispo Classical Academy, San Luis Obispo

== San Mateo County ==
=== Cabrillo Unified School District ===
  - Half Moon Bay High School, Half Moon Bay

=== Jefferson Union High School District ===
- Jefferson High School, Daly City
- Oceana High School, Pacifica
- Terra Nova High School, Pacifica
- Westmoor High School, Daly City

=== La Honda-Pescadero Unified School District ===
- Pescadero Middle and High School, Pescadero

=== San Mateo Union High School District ===
- Aragon High School, San Mateo
- Burlingame High School, Burlingame
- Capuchino High School, San Bruno
- Design Tech High School, Redwood Shores
- Hillsdale High School, San Mateo
- Mills High School, Millbrae
- San Mateo High School, San Mateo

=== Sequoia Union High School District ===
- Carlmont High School, Belmont
- Everest Public High School, Redwood City
- Menlo-Atherton High School, Atherton
- Sequoia High School, Redwood City
- Summit Preparatory Charter High School, Redwood City
- Woodside High School, Woodside

=== South San Francisco Unified School District ===
- Baden High School, South San Francisco
- El Camino High School, South San Francisco
- South San Francisco High School, South San Francisco

=== Private ===
- Aurora High School, Redwood City
- Crystal Springs Uplands School, Hillsborough
- East Palo Alto Phoenix Academy, East Palo Alto
- Eastside College Preparatory School, East Palo Alto
- German-American International School, Menlo Park
- Junípero Serra High School, San Mateo
- Menlo School, Atherton
- Mercy High School (Burlingame, California), Burlingame
- Mid-Peninsula High School, Menlo Park
- Notre Dame High School, Belmont
- The Nueva School, Hillsborough
- Pacific Rim International School, San Mateo
- Shiloh United School, South San Francisco
- Sacred Heart Prep, Atherton
- Woodside Priory School, Portola Valley

== Santa Barbara County ==
=== Carpinteria Unified School District ===
- Carpinteria High School, Carpinteria

=== Cuyama Joint Unified School District ===
- Cuyama Valley High School, New Cuyama

=== Lompoc Unified School District ===
- Cabrillo High School, Lompoc
- Lompoc High School, Lompoc

=== Santa Barbara Unified School District ===
- Dos Pueblos High School, Goleta
- San Marcos High School, Santa Barbara
- Santa Barbara High School, Santa Barbara

=== Santa Maria Joint Union High School District ===
- Ernest Righetti High School, Santa Maria
- Pioneer Valley High School, Santa Maria
- Santa Maria High School, Santa Maria

=== Santa Ynez Valley Union High School District ===
- Santa Ynez Valley Union High School, Santa Ynez

=== Alternative or continuation schools ===
- Alta Vista High School, Santa Barbara
- Delta High School, Santa Maria
- Foothill High School, Carpinteria
- La Cuesta High School, Santa Barbara
- Maple High School (continuation), Lompoc
- Refugio High School, Santa Ynez
- Rincon High School, Carpinteria
- Sierra Madre High School, New Cuyama

=== Private schools ===
- The Anacapa School, Santa Barbara
- Bishop Garcia Diego High School, Santa Barbara
- Cate School, Carpinteria
- Laguna Blanca School, Santa Barbara
- Lion of Judah Christian Academy, Orcutt
- Los Angeles Catholic Archdiocese
- Midland School, Los Olivos
- St. Joseph High School, Santa Maria
- Valley Christian Academy, Santa Maria
- Dunn School, Los Olivos

== Santa Clara County ==
=== Campbell Union High School District ===
- Boynton High School, San Jose
- Branham High School, San Jose
- Del Mar High School, San Jose
- Leigh High School, San Jose
- Prospect High School, Saratoga
- Stellar Learning Academy, Campbell
- Westmont High School, Campbell

=== East Side Union High School District ===
- Andrew P. Hill High School, San Jose
- East Side Cadet Academy, San Jose
- Evergreen Valley High School, San Jose
- Independence High School, San Jose
- James Lick High School, San Jose
- MACSA Academia Calmecac School, San Jose
- Mount Pleasant High School, San Jose
- Oak Grove High School, San Jose
- Piedmont Hills High School, San Jose
- San Jose Conservation Corps Charter School, San Jose
- Santa Teresa High School, San Jose
- Silver Creek High School, San Jose
- William C. Overfelt High School, San Jose
- Yerba Buena High School, San Jose

=== Fremont Union High School District ===
- Cupertino High School, Cupertino
- Fremont High School, Sunnyvale
- Homestead High School, Cupertino
- Lynbrook High School, San Jose
- Monta Vista High School, Cupertino

=== Gilroy Unified School District ===
- Christopher High School, Gilroy
- Dr. TJ Owens Gilroy Early College Academy (GECA), Gilroy
- Gilroy High School, Gilroy
- MACSA Elementary Portal Leadership Academy, San Jose

=== Los Gatos-Saratoga Joint Union High School District ===
- Los Gatos High School, Los Gatos
- Saratoga High School, Saratoga

=== Milpitas Unified School District ===
- Milpitas High School, Milpitas

=== Morgan Hill Unified School District ===
- Ann Sobrato High School, Morgan Hill
- Live Oak High School, Morgan Hill

=== Mountain View-Los Altos Union High School District ===
- Los Altos High School, Los Altos
- Mountain View High School, Mountain View
- Silicon Valley Essential High School, Los Altos

=== Palo Alto Unified School District ===
- Gunn High School, Palo Alto
- Palo Alto High School, Palo Alto

=== Roman Catholic Diocese of San Jose ===
- Archbishop Mitty High School, San Jose
- Bellarmine College Preparatory, San Jose
- Notre Dame High School, San Jose
- Presentation High School, San Jose
- Saint Francis High School, Mountain View

=== San Jose Unified School District ===
- Abraham Lincoln High School, San Jose
- Downtown College Prep, San Jose
- Gunderson High School, San Jose
- Leland High School, San Jose
- Middle College High School, San Jose
- Pioneer High School, San Jose
- San Jose High Academy, San Jose
- Willow Glen High School, San Jose

=== Santa Clara Unified School District ===
- Adrian C. Wilcox High School, Santa Clara
- Kathleen MacDonald High School, San Jose
- Santa Clara High School, Santa Clara
- Wilson Alternative High School, Santa Clara

=== Private Schools ===
- Cristo Rey San Jose Jesuit High School, San Jose
- Beacon School, San Jose
- BASIS Independent Silicon Valley, San Jose
- Cambrian Academy, San Jose
- Castilleja School, Palo Alto
- Communitas Charter High School, San Jose
- The Harker School, San Jose
- Kehillah Jewish High School, Palo Alto
- The King's Academy, Sunnyvale
- Liberty Baptist School, San Jose
- Mountain View Academy, Mountain View, Seventh-Day Adventist
- Oakwood School, Morgan Hill
- Our Shepherd's Academy, San Jose
- Palo Alto Preparatory School, Palo Alto
- Phoenixonian Institute, San Jose (1861–c. 1901)
- Pine Hill School, San Jose
- Pinewood School, Los Altos Hills
- Thomas More School, San Jose
- University Preparatory Academy, San Jose
- Valley Christian High School, San Jose
- White Road Baptist Academy, San Jose

== Santa Cruz County ==
=== Pajaro Valley Unified School District ===
- Aptos High School, Aptos
- Pajaro Valley High School, Watsonville
- Watsonville High School, Watsonville

=== San Lorenzo Valley Unified School District ===
- San Lorenzo Valley High School, Felton

=== Santa Cruz City School District ===
- Harbor High School, Santa Cruz
- Santa Cruz High School, Santa Cruz
- Soquel High School, Soquel

=== Scotts Valley Unified School District ===
- Scotts Valley High School, Scotts Valley

=== Alternative or continuation schools ===
- Costanoa Continuation High School, Santa Cruz
- Renaissance High School, La Selva Beach

=== Private schools ===
- Cypress Charter High School, Live Oak
- Delta Charter School, Santa Cruz
- Georgiana Bruce Kirby Preparatory School, Santa Cruz
- MCP Middle and High School (Monterey Coast Prep), Santa Cruz
- Monte Vista Christian School, Watsonville
- Monterey Bay Academy, Watsonville
- Pacific Collegiate School, Santa Cruz
- Saint Francis Central Coast Catholic High School, Watsonville
- Santa Cruz Waldorf High School, Santa Cruz
- Oasis Charter School, Santa Cruz

== Shasta County ==
=== Anderson Union High School District ===
- Anderson New Technology High School, Anderson
- Anderson Union High School, Anderson
- West Valley High School, Cottonwood

=== Fall River Joint Unified School District ===
- Burney High School, Burney
- Fall River High School, McArthur

=== Gateway Unified School District ===
- Central Valley High School, Shasta Lake

=== Shasta Union High School District ===
- Enterprise High School, Redding
- Foothill High School, Palo Cedro
- Shasta High School, Redding

=== Alternative or continuation schools ===
- Freedom High School, Redding
- Mountain Lakes High School, Shasta Lake
- Mountain View High School, Burney
- North Independence High School, Redding
- North Valley High School, Anderson
- Oakview High School, Anderson
- Pioneer Continuation High School, Redding
- Soldier Mountain High School, McArthur

=== Private schools ===
- Bishop Quinn High School, Palo Cedro
- Liberty Christian High School, Redding
- Nawa Academy, French Gulch
- Redding Christian High School, Redding
- Stellar Charter School, Redding
- University Preparatory School, Redding

== Sierra County ==
- Downieville School, Downieville
- Loyalton High School, Loyalton
- Pliocene Ridge Junior-Senior High School, North San Juan

== Siskiyou County ==
- Butte Valley High School, Dorris
- Cascade High School, Dorris
- Dunsmuir High School, Dunsmuir
- Etna High School, Etna
- Scott River High School, Etna
- Golden Eagle Charter School, Mount Shasta
- Siskiyou Union High School District
- Happy Camp High School, Happy Camp
- Jefferson High School, Mount Shasta
- McButt High School, McButt
- Mount Shasta High School, Mount Shasta
- Weed High School, Weed
- Tulelake Continuation High School, Tulelake
- Tulelake High School, Tulelake
- Discovery High School, Yreka
- Yreka High School, Yreka

== Solano County ==
=== Benicia Unified School District ===
- Benicia High School, Benicia

=== Dixon Unified School District ===
- Dixon High School, Dixon

=== Fairfield-Suisun Unified School District ===
- Angelo Rodriguez High School, Fairfield
- Armijo High School, Fairfield
- Fairfield High School, Fairfield

=== River Delta Unified School District ===
- Rio Vista High School, Rio Vista

=== Travis Unified School District ===
- Vanden High School, Fairfield

=== Vacaville Unified School District ===
- Vacaville High School, Vacaville
- Will C. Wood High School, Vacaville

=== Vallejo City Unified School District ===
- Jesse M. Bethel High School, Vallejo
- Vallejo High School, Vallejo

=== Alternative or continuation schools ===
- Country High School, Vacaville
- John Finney High School, Vallejo
- Liberty High School, Benicia
- Maine Prairie High School, Dixon
- Sem Yeto High School, Fairfield

=== Private schools ===
- Buckingham Charter Magnet High School, Vacaville
- Mare Island Technology Academy, Vallejo
- Mary Bird School, Fairfield
- St. Patrick-St. Vincent High School, Vallejo
- Vacaville Christian High School, Vacaville

== Sonoma County ==
=== Cloverdale Unified School District ===
- Cloverdale High School, Cloverdale

=== Cotati-Rohnert Park Unified School District ===
- Rancho Cotate High School, Rohnert Park
- Technology High School, Rohnert Park

=== Geyserville Unified School District ===
- Geyserville Educational Park High School, Geyserville

=== Healdsburg Unified School District ===
- Healdsburg High School, Healdsburg

=== Petaluma City Schools ===
- Casa Grande High School, Petaluma
- Petaluma High School, Petaluma

=== Roseland Public Schools ===
- Roseland University Prep, Santa Rosa

=== Santa Rosa City Schools ===
- Elsie Allen High School, Santa Rosa
- Maria Carrillo High School, Santa Rosa
- Montgomery High School, Santa Rosa
- Piner High School, Santa Rosa
- Santa Rosa High School, Santa Rosa

=== Sonoma Valley Unified School District ===
- Sonoma Valley High School, Sonoma

=== West Sonoma County Union High School District ===
- Analy High School, Sebastopol

=== Windsor Unified School District ===
- Windsor High School, Windsor

=== Alternative or continuation schools ===
- Carpe Diem High School, Petaluma
- Creekside High School, Sonoma
- El Camino High School, Rohnert Park
- Johanna Hanson-Echols High School, Cloverdale
- North Bay Met Academy, Windsor
- Ridgway High School, Santa Rosa
- San Antonio High School, Petaluma
- Sonoma Mountain High School, Petaluma
- Valley Oaks High School, Petaluma
- Windsor Oaks Academy, Windsor

=== Private schools ===
- Cardinal Newman High School, Santa Rosa
- Journey High School, Sebastopol
- Quest Forward High School, Santa Rosa
- Rio Lindo Adventist Academy, Healdsburg
- St. Vincent de Paul High School, Petaluma
- Sonoma Academy, Santa Rosa
- Summerfield Waldorf High School, Santa Rosa

== Stanislaus County ==
=== Ceres Unified School District ===
- Central Valley High School, Ceres
- Ceres High School, Ceres
- Whitmore Charter High School, Ceres

=== Denair Unified School District ===
- Denair High School, Denair

=== Hughson Unified School District ===
- Hughson Union High School, Hughson, Hughson

=== Modesto City Schools ===
- Fred C. Beyer High School, Modesto
- Grace M. Davis High School, Modesto
- James C. Enochs High School, Modesto
- Joseph Gregori High School, Modesto
- Modesto High School, Modesto
- Peter Johansen High School, Modesto
- Thomas Downey High School, Modesto

=== Newman-Crows Landing Unified School District ===
- Orestimba High School, Newman

=== Oakdale Joint Unified School District ===
- Oakdale High School, Oakdale

=== Patterson Joint Unified School District ===
- Patterson High School, Patterson

=== Riverbank Unified School District ===
- Riverbank High School, Riverbank

=== Turlock Unified School District ===
- John H. Pitman High School, Turlock
- Turlock High School, Turlock

=== Waterford Unified School District ===
- Waterford High School, Waterford

=== Alternative or continuation schools ===
- Adelante High School, Riverbank
- Argus High School, Ceres
- Del Puerto High School, Patterson
- East Stanislaus High School, Oakdale
- Roselawn High School, Turlock
- Sentinel High School, Waterford
- Valley Business High School, Modesto
- Valley Oak High School, Oakdale
- West Side Valley High School, Newman

=== Private schools ===
- Big Valley Grace Christian High School, Modesto
- Brethren Heritage School, Modesto
- Central Catholic High School, Modesto
- Community Middle College, Modesto
- Keyes to Learning Charter School, Keyes
- Modesto Christian High School, Modesto
- Turlock Christian High School, Turlock

== Sutter County ==
- East Nicolaus High School, Nicolaus
- Faith Christian Junior-Senior High School, Yuba City
- Live Oak High School, Live Oak
- River Valley High School, Yuba City
- Sutter Union High School, Sutter
- Yuba City High School, Yuba City

== Tehama County ==
- Corning High School, Corning
- Los Molinos High School, Los Molinos
- Mercy High School, Red Bluff
- Red Bluff High School, Red Bluff

== Trinity County ==
- Hayfork High School, Hayfork
- Southern Trinity High School, Mad River (address in Bridgeville in Humboldt County)
- Trinity High School, Weaverville

== Tulare County ==
=== Alpaugh Unified School District ===
- Alpaugh Senior High School, Alpaugh

=== Cutler-Orosi Unified School District ===
- Orosi High School, Orosi

=== Dinuba Unified School District ===
- Dinuba High School, Dinuba

=== Exeter Unified School District ===
- Exeter Union High School, Exeter

=== Farmersville Unified School District ===
- Farmersville High School, Farmersville

=== Lindsay Unified School District ===
- Lindsay High School, Lindsay

=== Porterville Unified School District ===
- Butterfield Charter High School, Porterville
- Granite Hills High School, Porterville
- Harmony Magnet Academy High School, Porterville
- Monache High School, Porterville
- Porterville High School, Porterville
- Strathmore High School, Porterville

=== Tulare Joint Union High School District ===
- Mission Oak High School, Tulare
- Tulare Union High School, Tulare
- Tulare Western High School, Tulare

=== Visalia Unified School District ===
- El Diamante High School, Visalia
- Golden West High School, Visalia
- Mount Whitney High School, Visalia
- Redwood High School, Visalia

=== Woodlake Unified School District ===
- Woodlake High School, Woodlake

=== Alternative or continuation schools ===
- Bravo Lake High School, Woodlake
- Citrus High School, Porterville
- Deep Creek Academy, Farmersville
- Esperanza High School, Cutler
- John C. Cairns Continuation, Lindsay
- Kaweah High School, Exeter
- Lovell High School, Cutler
- Sequoia High School, Visalia
- Sierra Vista High School, Dinuba
- Tulare Technical Preparatory High School, Tulare
- Tule Continuation, Alpaugh

=== Private schools ===
- Burton Pathways Charter High School, Porterville
- Central Valley Christian High School, Visalia
- Crescent Valley Public Charter, Tulare
- Crescent Valley Public Charter, Visalia
- La Sierra High School, Visalia
- Porterville Military Academy, Porterville
- Prospect Education Center, Porterville
- Summit Charter Collegiate High School, Porterville
- University Preparatory High School, Visalia
- Vine Street Community School, Porterville

== Tuolumne County ==
- Cold Springs High School, Tuolumne
- Mountain High School, Pinecrest
- Sonora High School, Sonora
- Southfork High School, Tuolumne
- Summerville Union High School, Tuolumne
- Tioga High School, Groveland

== Ventura County ==
=== Conejo Valley Unified School District ===
- Newbury Park High School, Newbury Park
- Thousand Oaks High School, Thousand Oaks
- Westlake High School, Westlake Village

=== Fillmore Unified School District ===
- Fillmore High School, Fillmore

=== Moorpark Unified School District ===
- The High School at Moorpark College, Moorpark
- Moorpark High School, Moorpark

=== Oak Park Unified School District ===
- Oak Park High School, Oak Park

=== Ojai Unified School District ===
- Nordhoff High School, Ojai

=== Oxnard Union High School District ===
- Adolfo Camarillo High School, Camarillo
- Channel Islands High School, Oxnard
- Del Sol High School, Oxnard (opens in 2022)
- Hueneme High School, Oxnard
- Oxnard High School, Oxnard
- Pacifica High School, Oxnard
- Rancho Campana High School, Camarillo
- Rio Mesa High School, Oxnard

=== Santa Paula Unified School District ===
- Santa Paula High School, Santa Paula

=== Simi Valley Unified School District ===
- Royal High School, Simi Valley
- Santa Susana High School, Simi Valley
- Simi Valley High School, Simi Valley

=== Ventura Unified School District ===
- Buena High School, Ventura
- Foothill Technology High School, Ventura
- Ventura High School, Ventura

=== Alternative or continuation schools ===
- Apollo High School, Simi Valley
- Chaparral High School, Ojai
- Community High School, Moorpark
- Conejo Valley High School, Thousand Oaks
- El Camino High School, Ventura
- Frontier High School, Camarillo
- Oak View High School, Oak Park
- Pacific High School, Ventura
- Renaissance High School, Santa Paula
- Sierra High School, Fillmore

=== Private schools ===
- Besant Hill School (formerly Happy Valley School), Ojai
- Cornerstone Christian School, Camarillo
- Grace Brethren High School Simi Valley
- La Reina High School, Thousand Oaks
- Los Angeles Catholic Archdiocese
- Mary B. Perry High School, Camarillo
- Newbury Park Adventist Academy, Newbury Park
- St. Bonaventure High School, Ventura
- Santa Clara High School, Oxnard
- The Thacher School, Ojai
- Ventura County Christian School, Ventura
- Villanova Preparatory School, Ojai
- Vista Real Charter High School, Oxnard
- Vista Real Charter High School, Santa Paula
- Vista Real Charter High School, Simi Valley
- Vista Real Charter High School, Ventura
- Weil Tennis Academy & College Prep School, Ojai

== Yolo County ==
- Cache Creek High School (Continuation), Yolo
- Davis Senior High School, Davis
- Delta High School, Clarksburg
- Esparto High School, Esparto
- Leonardo da Vinci High School, Davis
- Martin Luther King High, Davis
- Pioneer High School, Woodland
- River City High School, West Sacramento
- Winters High School, Winters
- Woodland High School, Woodland

== Yuba County ==
- Lindhurst High School, Olivehurst
- Marysville Charter Academy for the Arts, Marysville
- Marysville High School, Marysville
- New Life Christian School, Linda
- Wheatland High School, Wheatland
- Core Charter School, Marysville

== See also ==
- List of school districts in California
- List of closed secondary schools in California
