= Private School Athletic League =

High school athletic league in California

Private School Athletic League is a high school athletic conference that is part of the CIF Central Coast Section of the California Interscholastic Federation. It comprises 16 small private and/or charter high schools generally between San Jose and San Francisco along the San Francisco Peninsula.

== Members ==
- Pacific Bay Christian School
- Downtown College Prep
- Jewish Community High School of the Bay
- Kehillah Jewish High School
- KIPP San Jose Collegiate
- Latino College Preparatory Academy
- Liberty Baptist School
- Mid-Peninsula High School
- Mountain View Academy
- North Valley Baptist
- The Nueva School
- San Francisco Christian School
- St. Lawrence Academy High School (closed)
- Summit Preparatory Charter High School
- Summit Shasta Charter School (Daly City)
- Thomas More School
- University Preparatory Academy
- Design Tech High School
