= San Pasqual High School =

San Pasqual High School may refer to one of the following:

- San Pasqual High School (Escondido, California), U.S. (San Diego area)
- San Pasqual Valley High School, Winterhaven, California, U.S.
