= Saint Lawrence Academy (Santa Clara) =

Location
- 2000 Lawrence Court; Santa Clara, California 95051; United States; 37°21′31″N 121°59′44″W

Information
- Type: Private, coeducational
- Religious affiliation: Roman Catholic
- Established: 1975
- Closed: 2016
- President: Anay Limaye
- Principal: Alfred Preciado
- Faculty: 30
- Grades: 9–12
- Average class size: 21
- Student to teacher ratio: 20:1
- Campus: Suburban
- Colors: Green and Gold
- Team name: Celtic Warriors
- Accreditation: Western Association of Schools and Colleges
- Tuition: $15,650
- Director of Curriculum and Instruction: John Bennett
- Director of Admissions: Steven Clossick
- Athletic Director: Dwayne Taylor
- Activities Director: Amy Olein
- Vice Principal of Student Affairs: Laura Stoll
- Website: saintlawrenceacademy.com

Saint Lawrence Academy was a college-preparatory Roman Catholic high school in Santa Clara, California, United States, founded in 1975. The school was marketed for its small size with close interaction among students, administration, faculty, and counselors. It was affiliated with the Diocese of San Jose. It closed in 2016.

== Academics ==
As a college preparatory school, Saint Lawrence Academy's graduation requirements included coursework in English, mathematics, social studies, science, foreign language, fine arts, religious studies, computers and physical education. The school also offered Advanced Placement and various honors courses. Languages included French, Spanish, and American Sign Language.

== Athletics ==
Approximately 70% of Saint Lawrence Academy students participated in athletics. The Celtics fielded 14 teams in 11 sports, including basketball, baseball, cross country, golf, soccer, swimming, tennis, track and field, and volleyball.

Saint Lawrence Academy's Cross Country team began in 1988 and competed in the Private School Athletic League (PSAL). The school earned 10 individual qualifications to the Division 5 CIF State Cross Country Championships. Celtics runners competed in State Championship races nine times since 2000.

In 2010, the cross country team went undefeated during the regular league season and were co-league champions of the PSAL, representing the best overall team effort on the largest team in school history (33 athletes). The 2010 team also broke numerous school records, including overall team size, earning a perfect score in a league meet.

Saint Lawrence Academy Track and Field also began in 1998, and competed as a supplemental member of the West Bay Athletic League (WBAL). The Celtics earned a total of 11 CCS trials qualifications. Celtics athletes have competed in the CCS trials in 2001, 2003, 2005, 2006, 2007, 2008, 2009, 2010.

Saint Lawrence Academy's Baseball team has also been invited, perennially, to the CIF-CCS championships. The soccer team from the 1995–96 school year made the CCS playoffs for the first time in school history.

== History ==
In 1975 (51 years ago), Saint Lawrence Academy was founded.

=== Closure ===
On February 2, 2016 (10 years ago), the Diocese of San Jose announced the closure of Saint Lawrence Academy at the conclusion of the school year due to "a significant accumulated deficit, declining enrollment levels, and the inability to raise funds to stabilize and sustain operations".
