= Mountain View Academy (Mountain View, California) =

Location
- 360 S. Shoreline Blvd; Mountain View, California 94041; U.S.
- 37.3938722°N 122.0871812°W

Information
- Type: Private parochial, day school
- Motto: Educating the Whole Student for Eternity
- Denomination: Seventh-day Adventist Church
- Established: 1922
- Authority: Central California Conference, NAD
- Principal: Marc Andres
- Chaplain: Andrew Lee
- Faculty: 9
- Grades: 9-12
- Gender: Coeducational
- Enrollment: 66
- Campus: Urban, 3 acres (0.012 km^{2})
- Color: Blue Gold
- Athletics: Mustangs (varsity and junior varsity)
- Nickname: MVA
- Accreditation: WASC; AAA
- Yearbook: El Camino Real
- Website: https://www.mtnviewacademy.org/

Mountain View Academy is a Seventh-day Adventist secondary school (grades 9–12) located in Mountain View, California. It is part of the Seventh-day Adventist education system, the world's second largest Christian school system.

== Description ==
Mountain View Academy (MVA) is located on a plot of 3 acres (1.2 ha) near downtown Mountain View between Shoreline Blvd, Dana St, California Avenue, and Mountain View Avenue. The campus consists of a gymnasium, classrooms, and housing for faculty and staff.

MVA is a co-educational Christian high school for day students. The program is college preparatory. It is part of a network of more than 5,000 educational facilities, and it is owned and operated by the Central California Conference of the Seventh-day Adventist Church,

Students at MVA participate in annual mission trips.

== History ==
In September 1904, the Seventh-day Adventist-run Pacific Press Publishing Association relocated to the newly incorporated city of Mountain View, and brought with it about one hundred families. At the time, Mountain View had a population of about 600. From 1904 until 1906, employees sent their children to the Mountain View public grammar school about one mile away from the Press. To provide religious education for their children, the Adventists started an elementary school on Shoreline Boulevard beginning in 1906. The church school started with three grades, and soon grew to eight, staffing four teachers. As the students graduated from the eighth grade, they were encouraged to go away to boarding school. But since some of the parents felt that their children were too young to go away to boarding school, gradually grades nine and ten were offered so that the students could be kept at home until they were a little older.

In 1922, the school began to offer eleventh and twelfth grade education, and the first graduating class consisting of seven members finished their work in the spring of 1923. Because grades nine to twelve demanded additional facilities, the first eight grades were moved to a new location on Villa Street in 1922, and renamed "The Miramonte Church school." The school offered programs in English, mathematics, history, science, Spanish, domestic science, physical education, and religious and Bible studies. The school later offered classes in choir and band.

By the mid-1960s, the growing student body and accreditation requirements required the MVA to rebuild. The academy purchased land in Cupertino, but later decided to rebuild on its current location on Shoreline Boulevard due to financial difficulties with the Cupertino site. The academy purchased the adjacent Mountain View Adventist Church to use as a chapel. The academy also made plans to build shower and locker facilities, a gymnasium, and an auditorium. Construction finished in the summer of 1967.

On October 22, 1970, a three-alarm fire destroyed the MVA gymnasium. After the fire, the academy used the chapel building that it had purchased five years prior for storage, assemblies, and an improvised band and choir practice room. On April 18, 1971, another three-alarm fire broke out in the chapel. It took firemen from four cities to prevent the spread of the flames to the rest of the newly constructed campus.

== Athletics ==
Mountain View Academy is a member of the Private School Athletic League, under the Central Coast Section of the California Interscholastic Federation. Students who participate in the Mountain View athletics program do not compete on Saturdays due to Sabbath observance.

== Accreditation ==
MVA offers a 4-year educational program that complies with the Educational Code of the State of California and is accredited by the Western Association of Schools and Colleges and the Adventist Accrediting Association.

== See also ==
- List of Seventh-day Adventist secondary schools
