= Phillip & Sala Burton High School =

Location
- 400 Mansell Street; San Francisco, California; United States; 37.7213°N 122.4067°W

Information
- Established: 1984
- School district: San Francisco Unified School District
- Principal: Suniqua Thomas
- Faculty: 52.49 (FTE)
- Grades: 9-12
- Enrollment: 1,060 (2022–23)
- Student to teacher ratio: 20.19
- Campus type: Urban
- Color
- Team name: Pumas
- Accreditation: Western Association of Schools and Colleges (WASC)
- Website: www.sfusd.edu/school/phillip-and-sala-burton-academic-high-school

Phillip and Sala Burton Academic High School (colloquially Burton High School; BHS) is a public high school in San Francisco, California.

The founding of the school was a result of a consent decree ruling in 1984 between the City of San Francisco and the National Association for the Advancement of Colored People. First established in the Silver Terrace neighborhood, the current campus is located in Visitacion Valley at 400 Mansell Avenue, on the former site of Woodrow Wilson High School. The school is named after former U.S. Representatives Phillip Burton and his wife Sala Burton.

From January 2007 to May 2009, Leadership High School cohabited with Burton High School, as did Metropolitan Arts and Tech Charter School from May 2009 to May 2011.

== History ==
Phillip & Sala Burton High School sits on the site of the former Woodrow Wilson High School, which had its first graduating class in 1964.

Phillip & Sala Burton Academic High School was established in 1984 under the court's guidance as a consent decree between the NAACP and the City and County of San Francisco.

== Facilities ==
Public radio station KALW bases its studios on the Burton campus.

The school opened its student wellness center in 2005, the seventh in the district.

== Demographics ==
According to U.S. News & World Report, 98% of Burton's student body is "of color," with 73% of the student body coming from an economically disadvantaged household, determined by student eligibility for California's reduced-price meal program.

White	Latino	Asian	African American	Pacific Islander	American Indian	Two or More Races
2%	23%	56%	10%	4%	0.3%	3%

African-American enrollment has steadily declined in regards to the overall student enrollment. African-American families have left San Francisco for more affordable locales (in 1970 the city's African-American population was 13%; by 2006 the population had declined to 6%).

== Notable alumni ==
Antonio Warren, pro football player

== See also ==
- San Francisco County high schools
