= West Bay Athletic League =

- Named after: San Francisco Bay
- Website: hs.wbalsports.org/home.html

The West Bay Athletic League is a high school athletic conference established in 2002 as part of the CIF Central Coast Section of the California Interscholastic Federation. It comprises twelve private high schools generally around San Mateo County and Santa Clara County, California.

== History ==
The West Bay Athletic League was formed in 2002 from a realignment of the Private School Athletic League. Since its formation, it was expanded in 2008 to offer coed sports and two divisions, Foothill and Skyline.

== Sports ==
West Bay Athletic League Sports
Season
Fall	Winter	Spring
Cross Country (XC)	Basketball (BB)	Golf (GOb) (Note: (Boys))
Golf (GOg) (Note: (Girls))	Soccer (FS)	Lacrosse (LC)
Tennis (TNg)		Softball (SB)
Volleyball (VB)		Swimming (SW)
		Tennis (TNb)
Track and Field (TF)

== Members ==
Certain member schools also compete in the Peninsula Athletic League for selected sports.

West Bay Athletic League Schools
School	City	Colors	Mascot
Castilleja School	Palo Alto		Gators
Crystal Springs Uplands School	Hillsborough		Gryphons
Eastside College Prep	East Palo Alto		Panthers
Harker School	San Jose		Eagles
The Kings Academy	Sunnyvale		Knights
Menlo School	Atherton		Knights
Mercy High School, Burlingame	Burlingame		Crusaders
Notre Dame High School, Belmont	Belmont		Tigers
Notre Dame High School, San Jose	San Jose		Regents
Pinewood School	Los Altos Hills		Panthers
Priory School	Portola Valley		Panthers
Sacred Heart Preparatory	Atherton		Gators
