= Glacier High School Charter =

American Secondary Charter School

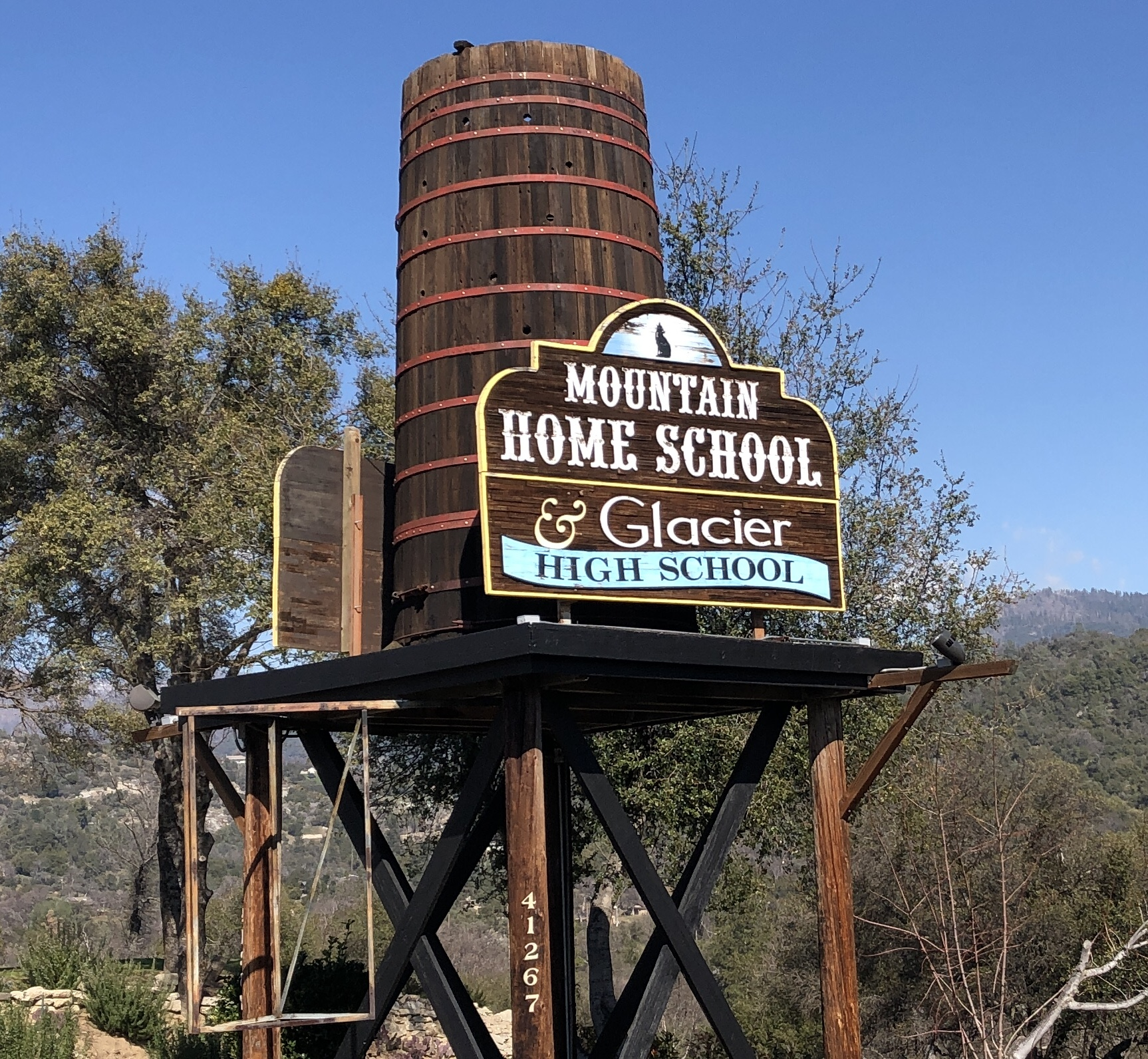

Location
- 41267 CA-41, Oakhurst, 93644; Madera County, California; United States; 37.3483000°N 119.6413956°W

Information
- Established: August 19, 2002
- School district: Glacier High School Charter District
- NCES District ID: 0601555
- NCES School ID: 060155510541
- Administrator: Michael Cox
- Principal: Mindy Klang
- Grades: 9-12
- Enrollment: 94 (2021-2022)
- Website: https://www.glacierhighcharter.org/

Glacier High School Charter (GHS) is an American public charter high school located in Oakhurst, California. GHS shares its campus with Mountain Home School Charter.

== Overview ==
=== Student Demographics ===
As of the 2020-2021 school year, 126 students were enrolled at Glacier, with a student-teacher ratio of 14.6. The ethnic breakdown of the student body is 63.5% White, 20.6% Hispanic, 4% Asian, 3.2% African American, and 1.6% American Indian, with two or more races accounting for the remaining 7.1% of the student body.

== History ==
After being chartered through the Yosemite Unified School District, GHS received final approval for operation from the California State Board of Education in June 2002. Glacier's first day of student attendance was 19 August 2002, with sixteen students enrolled. In 2006, a GHS satellite campus opened in Fresno county, later moving to a different location in Fresno county in 2015. In 2008-09, GHS and Mountain Home School collaborated to form the non-profit educational institution Western Sierra Charter Schools. By the 2018-19 school year, GHS had a student body of 126.

== Extracurricular activities ==
=== Academic Decathlon ===
Glacier High has been a recurring participant in the Madera County Academic Decathlon competition since 2014. In the 2021 competition, GHS won the "Super Quiz" competition, and placed second in the main competition, behind Madera South High School by 51.7 points.

=== Poetry Out Loud ===
GHS won the Madera County Poetry Out Loud competition in early 2020, with a student advancing to the California state competition that was held March 15–16, 2020 in Sacramento.

== Awards ==
On January 25, 2021, Glacier received the 2020 College Board AP Computer Science Female Diversity Award.

== See also ==
- List of high schools in California
- Oakhurst, California
