= Pacific Collegiate School =

Location
- 3004 Mission Street Ext., Santa Cruz, CA 95060; Santa Cruz, CA; 36.9534°N 122.0488°W

Information
- Type: Charter; Public
- Established: 1999
- School code: 053270
- Head of school: Christopher Guyer
- Enrollment: By lottery
- Colors: White, Black and Silver
- Mascot: Puma
- Nickname: PCS

Pacific Collegiate School is a grades 7-12 charter school located on the westside of Santa Cruz, California. Currently, the number of students is about 514. The school mascot is the Puma, and the school colors are white, black and silver.

According to Newsweek, in 2007 Pacific Collegiate was among the top 22 "elite public schools" in the United States.

PCS was named the #2 high school overall in the nation and the #1 charter school in the nation in the December 10, 2007, issue of U.S. News & World Report. The 2009 ranking places it as the #3 high school overall.

== History ==
Over a period of about twenty years, beginning in the 1970s, a group of parents and teachers in Santa Cruz, California, often met to discuss educational reform. They envisioned schools that inspire students to learn through an integrated curriculum, leading to a high level of intellectual and artistic achievement. These people were Catharine Gill, an English literature teacher, Josette Nauenberg, Meg Smith, and Christiane Young, a French teacher. California charter school legislation made it possible for this group to conceive of implementing their ideas.

In the spring of 1998, Gill and Young, joined by Singne Coe, a history teacher, began discussing the feasibility of developing an academically strong public charter high school in Santa Cruz, CA. From the outset, Nauenberg, Smith, and Delia Krupp, a Cabrillo College art teacher, also worked on this project. Input on the math and science curriculum was given by some teachers in Santa Cruz, teachers from the private school, York, in Monterey, and a few UCSC professors.

Because of some of the founders’ experience with international schools, the new school was envisioned to be at the same level as public high schools in countries such as France and Japan. To achieve this goal, the school's courses were to be aligned with the expectations of the Advanced Placement program, with passing at least one AP exam a requirement for graduation. The key concepts were that students would have an international perspective particularly in their humanities courses, rigorous math and science courses, and a rich arts curriculum at each level. Upon graduation all students would be U.C. eligible. The founders believed, based on their own experience, that most students could achieve those goals with sufficient self-discipline, effective instruction with integration of subjects, and a school culture of respect for learning and accountability.

During 1998-99, Gill worked full-time planning the school, Young developed the foreign languages curriculum with input from Yadira Llort, a Spanish teacher, and Krupp developed the arts program. Smith planned and managed the budget for the school, and worked on community outreach. Nauenberg explained the founders’ vision to prospective parents and solicited support. Collectively the group developed integrated curricula for each grade level, academic and behavioral policies, a business plan which included teacher salary and benefit parity with Santa Cruz City Schools teachers, and governance policies to avoid high administrative costs. The core group applied for and received a charter school planning grant from the State, and Smith obtained a Walton Foundation grant.

A PCS Board was formed, with Reed Hastings, a charter school advocate, agreeing to be president, though he left the planning of the school to the core group. When the Santa Cruz City Schools Board twice denied the initial PCS charter, written by Gill with input from the core group, the Santa Cruz County Superintendent of Schools, Diane Siri, encouraged Gill to present the charter to her Board, and Smith worked with that Board's business manager to develop ways to handle finances for the school. The PCS charter was granted by the Santa Cruz County Board of Education on 26 April 1999.

Securing funding, managing a startup enterprise, and finding affordable space was a daunting challenge. David Hodges, an interested parent and former professor of business, joined the core group, contributing his real estate expertise and contacts in the community. He and Gill were able to negotiate a lease for use of space at the Congregational Church on High St. and at the neighboring High St. Community Church.

A principal from Los Gatos was selected after an extensive search, but for personal reasons, she withdrew her candidacy, and Gayle Larson, who'd been hired to teach history, was hired as principal for the first year only. When unexpectedly she left town for most of the summer, the core group took over the work of hiring teachers, handling student applications, and preparing the site. Llort travelled from San Diego to conduct an outreach and application effort with Spanish speakers in the community.

On Sept. 13, 1999, the first school year of PCS began after a year and a half of intensive planning and community outreach. The concept for the school, however, grew from the decades of combined educational experience of the small group of founding teachers and parents.

From 1999 to 2004 PCS did not have its own campus, instead, it shared the campus space with Natural bridges elementary, which closed in 2004. PCS stayed on its campus until 2015 when the construction for its new campus finished after which the school moved, PCS has been there ever since.

== Admission ==
Admission to Pacific Collegiate School is determined by a lottery where most applicants are randomly chosen for admission from a pool. There is one important exception to this system. Children of staff, board members, and former board members are granted automatic admission. Board members are required to commit a minimum of 20 hours a month to board duties. As of July 2025, the board consists of 11 members.

With the exception of an unspecified number of spaces reserved for children of volunteer Board members and school staff, admission is by lottery for families. This means that if the oldest child is selected by lottery, younger children in the family will have spaces reserved for them in future classes while both students are attending.

A waiting list is constantly maintained in case spaces open up during the year due to a family moving out of the area or transferring to another school. Demand is very high, and there are typically as many students on the waiting list as there are enrolled in the school. Class sizes generally get smaller with each year.

== Diversity ==
Like many charter schools, Pacific Collegiate has been accused of inadequately representing the diversity of the community. As its charter with the Santa Cruz County Office of Education requires its student body to represent city demographics, Pacific Collegiate's Board has been making active efforts to increase minority enrollment, though some proposals are still challenged. In the February 2007 lottery for admission, minority enrollment was up significantly, though is still well below city and county levels. As of 2006, 50% of students in the County of Santa Cruz were Latino, 30% of students in the City of Santa Cruz were Latino, and 5% of the Pacific Collegiate student body were Latino. 15% of the 2007-08 7th grade were Latino, indicating significant change within a two year period. However, roughly 10 years later in 2019, there has been little to no improvement. According to data released by Pacific Collegiate School in 2019, Hispanic and Latino students made up just 14.5% of the student body. This means that Pacific Collegiate School is enrolling roughly 30% less Hispanic and Latino students than is represented by county demographics.

Pacific Collegiate School has also faced criticism for its lack of income diversity among the student body. The Santa Cruz Sentinel notes that "Pacific Collegiate also lags far behind nearby schools in terms of the number of its students that qualify for free or reduced price lunches, a proxy for family income."

In response to complaints to lack of diversity, some have pointed out the impossibility of consciously diversifying the school with the current random lottery entry system.{{fact}} The lottery admission system means that there is a large element of randomization in admittance of those who apply. In addition, the outreach efforts by the school are limited. As a college preparatory track, some compare the student body of PCS to the "college track" programs at Santa Cruz and Harbor High. {{fact}}

== Curriculum ==
The curriculum at PCS aims to prepare students for Advanced Placement classes, classes that are considered equivalent in difficulty to college level classes. All students are required to take several AP classes, which are shown in the table below. Classes marked with an asterisk are not required in order to graduate. In years with multiple classes listed, the student can choose between them.

	Year 1	Year 2	Year 3	Year 4	Year 5	Year 6
Mathematics	Pre-Algebra*	Algebra 1	Algebra 2	Geometry	Pre-Calculus*/AP Computer Science*	AP Calculus BC*/AP Statistics*
English	American Literature	Ancient World Literature	Medieval World Literature	Modern World Literature	AP English Language	AP English Literature
Science	Life Science	Physical Science	Conceptual Physics	Chemistry	AP Biology	AP Physics B*/AP Chemistry*/AP Environmental Science*
History	American History	Ancient World History	Medieval World History	AP World History	AP United States History	Local Government & Politics
Arts	Study Skills/Technology	Arts Level 1	Arts Level 2	Arts Level 3	Arts Level AP*	Elective*
Foreign Language	Language 1	Language 2	Language 3	Language AP*	Elective	Elective

The Arts department at Pacific Collegiate offers Instrumental Music, Choir, Visual Art, Dance, Drama (Performing Arts), Video Production, and Arts Rotation. All students take 3 years of any arts at the high school level to fulfill graduation requirements. Dance is only a one-year class, as is Video Production.

The foreign languages offered are Spanish, Latin, French, and Mandarin. All students are required to take levels one, two, and three of at least one foreign language. The Advanced Placement level is optional.

- The student may take a test before the start of their seventh grade year to determine if they will get into Pre-Algebra or Algebra 1

== Awards ==
In 2006 PCS was named California Charter School of the Year by the Charter School Association. The class of 2006 includes 8 National Merit Finalists, and all of the students in this class were accepted at colleges. In 2006, PCS's AP World History program (directed by teacher Tara Firenzi) won an award for being the best AP World History program in the nation.

U.S. News & World Report, which ranks high schools based primarily on AP enrollment, in its December 4, 2009, issue ranked PCS the #3 high school overall in the nation (behind Thomas Jefferson High School in Alexandria, Virginia and Oxford Academy in Cypress, California) and the #1 charter school in the nation. In 2017 PCS was named a California Gold Ribbon School by the California Department of Education, and ranked by U.S. News & World Report as the 2017 Top Public School in California and the No. 10 Public School in the nation. In May 2019, U.S. News & World Report ranked PCS the 44th best public school nationwide.

== Alumni ==
There are some notable PCS alumni including, but not limited to:

Name	Years at PCS	Notable achievements
Pascal Le Boeuf	1998-2004	Won a GRAMMY for Best Instrumental Composition in 2025 for the song "Strands"

== Athletics ==
While PCS doesn't offer all sports, they do offer boys and girls basketball, volleyball, soccer, along with COED track and field, cross country, lacrosse, and swimming. Most well known for boys volleyball, the team was D-II champions in 2017 and went to the NOR-CAL finals. During the 2019 and 2020 seasons, boys basketball seasons the team went undefeated in their league.

== Controversies ==
In July 2024, a math teacher at Pacific Collegiate School named Trung Minh Lai was charged with attempted statutory rape of a 17 year old student of his at Pacific Collegiate School. The Santa Cruz Police Department brought charges against Lai for unlawful sexual intercourse with a minor, communicating with a minor for a lewd act, meeting a minor for lewd purposes and child molestation. According to the police, Lai had been grooming the student over the course of the past several months. Lai had been a teacher at Pacific Collegiate School since 2013, when he moved to Santa Cruz to teach at the school.

== See also ==
- Santa Cruz County high schools
