= Antonio Warren =

American gridiron football player (born 1975)

No. 32
- Position: Running back

Personal information
- Born: November 25, 1975 (age 50); San Francisco, California, U.S.

Career information
- College: Cal Poly

Career history
- 2001–2002: Calgary Stampeders
- 2004–2006: BC Lions

Awards and highlights
- Grey Cup champion (2001)

Antonio Warren (born November 25, 1975) is an American former professional football running back who played for the BC Lions and Calgary Stampeders of the Canadian Football League (CFL).

== Early life ==
Warren was born in San Francisco, California. He graduated from Wilson High in the Bay Area (today, Phillip & Sala Burton High).

== College career ==
Warren attended Cal Poly in San Luis Obispo, recruited by Andre Patterson. He compiled 4,819 all-purpose career yards for the Mustangs.

In 1997, when he earned Division I-AA All-Independents First Team selection, Cal Poly finished the season ranked in the top 20 of the national polls.

Collegiate statistics
	GP	Rush Att.	Rush Yds.	Avg.	LG	TD	Rec.	Rec. Yds.	Avg.	LG	TD	KR	Yds.	Avg.	LG	TD
1994 (Fr.)	11	134	582	4.3	45	5	28	222	7.9	26	3	2	40	20.0	20	0
1995 (So.)	11	221	1,111	5.0	65	7	21	208	9.9	50	1	4	103	25.8	49	0
1996 (Inj./RS)	2	24	130	5.4	18	1	1	16	16.0	16	0	0	0	-	-	0
1997 (Jr.)	11	191	1,151	6.0	70	11	19	149	7.8	17	0	0	0	-	-	0
1998 (Sr.)	9	148	860	5.8	80	6	11	78	7.1	34	1	8	169	21.1	27	0
Totals	44	718	3,834	5.3	80	30	80	673	8.4	50	5	14	312	22.3	49	0

== Professional career ==
=== Calgary Stampeders ===
In 2001, with the Stampeders he led the CFL in kickoff returns and was second in punt return yardage (764).

=== BC Lions ===
He signed with the BC Lions prior to the 2004 season and replaced Kelvin Anderson as their starting running back. He had a career-high 1,136 yards rushing in his first full season as a starter. He set a club record with 160 yards on 18 carries in a losing effort in the 2004 Grey Cup game against the Toronto Argonauts. That Grey Cup total ranked second all-time, trailing only Johnny Bright's 171 yards in 1956, at the time the game was played (though Kory Sheets has since broke Bright's record in the 2013 Grey Cup with 197 yards).

In 2005, he led the CFL in rushing touchdowns with 13 and ranked second overall with 16. He led the Lions in rushing for the second straight season and was fourth in the CFL with 2,179 combined yards.

In 2006, Warren rushed for 169 yards in five games with the Lions before he was released in July. Joe Smith replaced him as the Lions' starting running back.

== Professional regular season statistics ==
Year	Team	Rush Att.	Yards	Avg.	LG	TD
2001	Calgary Stampeders	59	372	6.3	39	1
2002	Calgary Stampeders	23	138	6.0	37	0
2004	BC Lions	219	1,136	5.2	37	5
2005	BC Lions	205	983	4.8	50	13
2006	BC Lions	41	169	4.1	16	0
	CFL totals	547	2,798	5.1	50	19
