= University Preparatory Academy =

Charter school

Location
- 2315 Canoas Garden Avenue; California; Silicon Valley; San Jose, Santa Clara, California 95125; United States; 37°17′30″N 121°52′29″W

Information
- School type: Charter School
- Established: 2007
- Founder: Daniel Ordaz, Jacklyn Guevara, Dorothy Westerhoff, Kurt Foreman
- Status: Open
- CEEB code: 054245
- Principal: David Porter
- Principal: Mr.Porter
- Grades: 7–12
- Age range: 12-18
- Enrollment: 650
- Average class size: 25
- Student to teacher ratio: 21:1
- Classrooms: Named After Colleged
- Colors: Gold and blue
- Sports: Basketball, Volleyball, Track and Field, Cross Country, Cheerleading (High School Varsity and Middle School)
- Mascot: Glen the Golden Eagle
- Nickname: The Golden Eagle
- Team name: Eagles
- Rival: Leigh High School "Longhorns"
- Accreditation: WASC
- National ranking: 120th
- Yearbook: Student Yearbook
- Tuition: Free
- Website: www.upasv.org

University Preparatory Academy (UPA) is a charter school located in San Jose, California, United States. Its charter was approved by the Santa Clara Board of Trustees. UPA opened in the fall of 2007 as a middle and high school, offering grades 7–12th. As of 2020, approximately 650 students attend UPA with a 21:1 student-teacher ratio.

In 2020, UPA was ranked the 120th best high school in the nation and the 13th best in California by U.S. News & World Report.

== Background ==
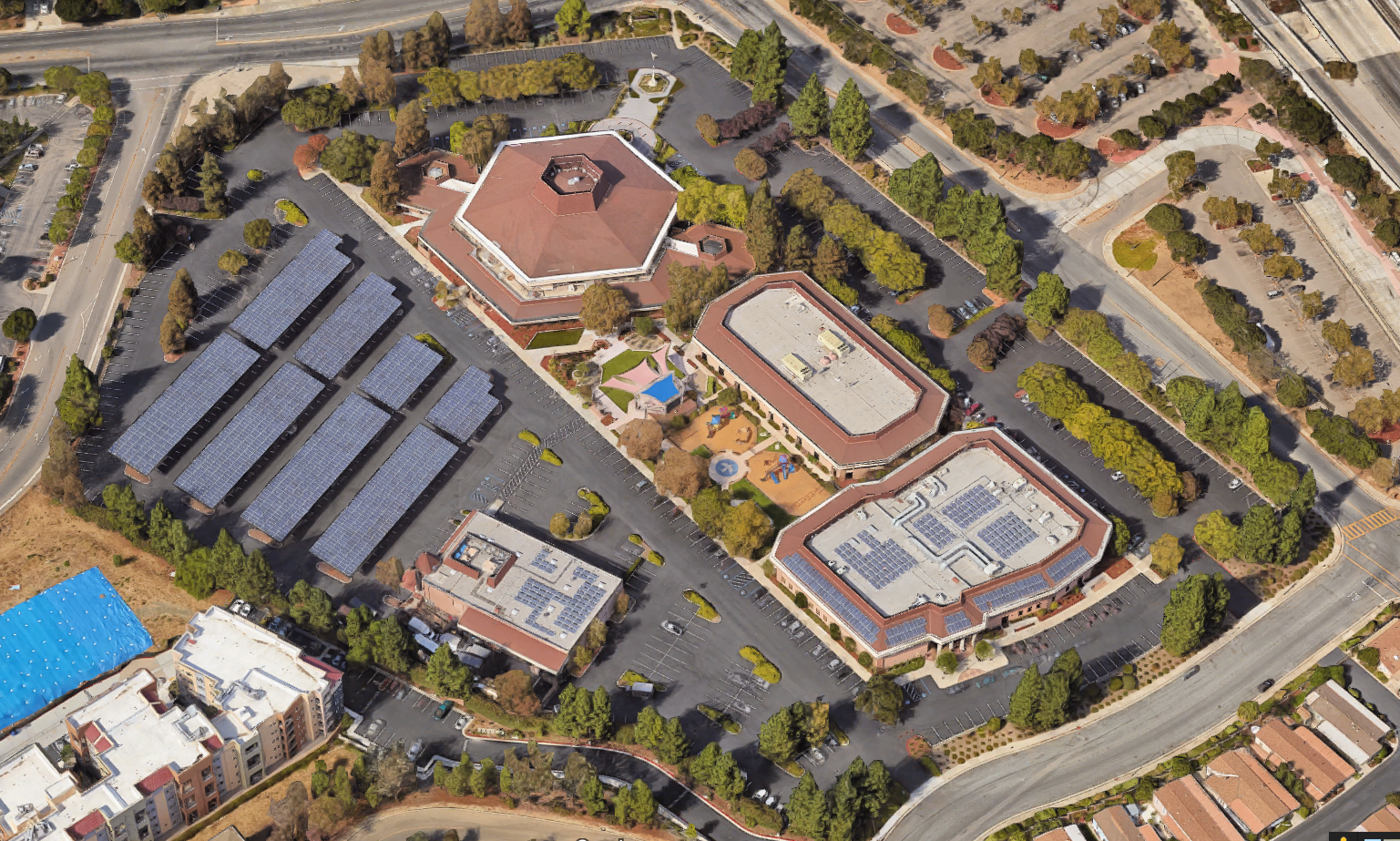
3D rendering of the UPA campus

UPA was founded as University Preparatory Academy in 2007.

UPA's campus is located near downtown San Jose in the Willow Glen area. It shares its campus with the Cathedral of Faith, and features its own outdoors amphitheater. It is also next to the Cathedral of Faith Cafe which many students go to.

== Available courses ==
=== Core classes ===
- Mathematics - Common Core (Math 7, Math 8, Integrated Math 1, Integrated Math 2, Integrated Math 3, Integrated Math 3+), Statistics, Pre-Calculus, AP Calculus AB, AP Calculus BC
- English - English 7-12, AP Language and Composition, AP Literature and Composition
- Foreign Languages - Spanish 1, Spanish 2, Spanish 3, Spanish Immersion, AP Spanish Language, AP Spanish Literature
- Science - Life Science, Physical Science, Biology, Chemistry, Physics, AP Environmental Science, AP Biology, AP Chemistry, AP Physics 1, Marine Biology
- History - Ancient Civilizations, American History, World Geography, World History, U.S. History, Economics, AP U.S. Government and Politics, AP World History, AP U.S. History, Ethnic Studies

== Clubs ==
University Preparatory Academy has a number of clubs, founded and funded mostly by students and widely ranging in theme.

- Chess Club
- Science Olympiad
- Vietnamese Student Association
- Speech and Debate
- Interact Club 5170 Area 7
- LatinX club
- GirlUp!
- International Biology Olympiad
- Science Olympiad
- Web Design Club
- Design Club
- Innovation, Design, Engineering and Animation Club (IDEA)
- Creature Conservation Club
- Korean Culture Club (대박!)
- ARK Club (Acts of Random Kindness)
- Spanish Club (Unidad Poder Academico)
- Filipino Culture Club (Hawak-Kamay)
- BARC (Big-hearted Animal Rescue Club)
- Inter-Key Club
- SNAP Fundraiser Club
- Robotics Club
- FBLA (Future Business Leaders of America)
- Girls Who Code Club
- Hack Club
- Creative Writing Club

== Athletics ==
The UPA Golden Eagles field 12 teams in 4 sports, with both middle school and varsity teams. The Golden Eagles compete in the Private School Athletic League of the CIF Central Coast Section.

Season	Sports
Fall	Cross country, Volleyball (girls)
Winter	Basketball
Spring	Track and field, Volleyball (boys)

== Theatre and Dance Department ==
Each year UPA hosts two drama productions (a fall play and spring musical) and a fall dance showcase every spring by the students in dance classes at the school. Students can audition to perform in the theatre productions or apply to be on technical crews or part of the band for musicals. Below is a list of some of UPA's previous shows.

- 2010–2011: Lovers' Quarrels, You're a Good Man, Charlie Brown
- 2011–2012: I Hate Shakespeare!, Grease
- 2012–2013: 30 Reasons NOT To Be In A Play, Once On This Island
- 2013–2014: The Broken Badge, Hairspray
- 2014–2015: Snow Angel, Once Upon A Mattress
- 2015–2016: Spy School, Footloose
- 2016–2017: The End of the World (With Prom to Follow), Singin' in the Rain
- 2017–2018: Emma!
- 2018-2019: Porter: Judas' Best Friend

== Events ==
University Preparatory Academy holds schoolwide events. Such events include:

- School Dances — Many dances are held throughout the year, including Homecoming, the Halloween Dance, Spring Dance, and Prom.
- Drama Productions — These are showcased twice every year, and UPA students are recruited to act in or support a play. Typically, the finished products are showcased in fall and spring.
- Junior College Trip — Once a year, junior students are taken on a trip to southern California to tour colleges, such as the University of California, Los Angeles, the University of California, Irvine, California Polytechnic State University, and others. Students on this trip learn about the application process and familiarize themselves with college campuses.
- Annual College Trip — Each class visits a regional university to ready themselves for graduation from high school and entrance into college. Schools visited include Stanford University, the University of California, Berkeley, San José State University, and the University of California, Santa Cruz.
- Rallies - There are around 5 rallies in a school year. Since 2025 all grade levels attend with previous rallies only being open to high schoolers. In rallies there is a different theme for each, with each grade trying to win in different, carefully crafted games. The last rally of the school year is the BOTC rally. Students can opt into this and practice for one to two months to perform their dance in front of the entire school.

== Administration ==
=== Founders ===
- Daniel Ordaz — Education Consultant, Retired Assistant Superintendent of East Side Union High School District
- Jacklyn Guevara — Retired Executive Director of East Side Union High School District
- Dorothy Westerhoff — Education Consultant, Retired Educator/School Administrator of East Side Union High School District.
- Kurt Foreman — Director of Operations for Cathedral of Faith

== Staff ==
- David Porter - Executive Director
