= Castilleja School =

Prep school in Palo Alto, California, US

Coordinates: 37.4388°N 122.1517°W

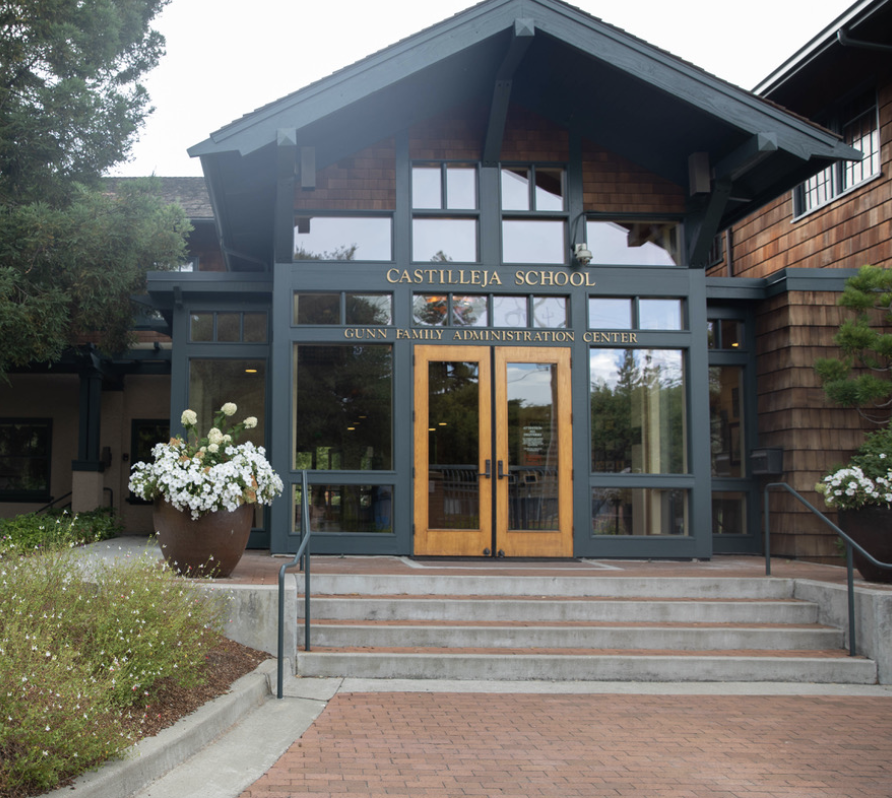
- Palo Alto, California; United States

Information
- Type: Private, College-prep
- Motto: Women Learning – Women Leading
- Established: 1907
- Founder: Mary Ishbel Lockey
- Head of School: Betty Noel-Pierre
- Grades: 6-12
- Gender: Girls
- Enrollment: 426
- Average class size: 15
- Student to teacher ratio: 6:1
- Campus size: 6 acre
- Campus type: Suburban
- Athletics conference: CIF Central Coast Section (West Bay Athletic League)
- Mascot: Gator
- Tuition: $62,400
- Website: castilleja.org

Castilleja School is an independent school for girls in grades six through 12, located in Palo Alto, California. It is the only non-sectarian all-girls middle and high school in the San Francisco Bay Area. The faculty consists of approximately 70 full-time and part-time women and men. Castilleja is a member of the California Association of Independent Schools and the National Coalition of Girls' Schools.

== History ==
Castilleja was founded in 1907 by Mary Ishbel Lockey. Originally from Montana, Lockey graduated from Stanford University in 1902, majoring in English. Lockey was a charter member of Alpha Phi and was the first Stanford Alpha Phi elected to Phi Beta Kappa. She was encouraged by Stanford's first president, David Starr Jordan, to start a school that would offer girls a comprehensive, college preparatory education. In its early years, some boys were allowed to take classes at Castilleja.

The school's core values, known as "the 5 Cs," include conscience, courtesy, character, courage, and charity.

In 1910, the school moved to its present location at 1310 Bryant Street, and the first structure was the administration building, designed by architect Roy C. Heald in American Craftsman style. In 1926, the Castilleja chapel was designed by architect Birge Clark, in a complementary design to the existing administration building.

In 2007, Castilleja celebrated the 100th anniversary of its founding.

=== Expansion proposal ===
In 2016, Castilleja announced its intentions to build an underground parking garage and upgrade and replace buildings to increase enrollment to 540 students. Because of the scale of the proposed development in an R1 zoned neighborhood, the project has experienced considerable opposition among neighboring residents. One concern has been traffic impact. In June 2022, the Palo Alto City Council approved the school's permit to expand the school's enrollment, renovate its campus, and build a parking garage.

== Recognition ==
Castilleja is accredited by the Western Association of Schools and Colleges and is a member of the National Association of Independent Schools, the National Coalition of Girls' Schools, and the College Board. In late 2007, the Wall Street Journal identified Castilleja School as one of the world's top 50 schools for its success. In 2009, Castilleja was given the highest accreditation rating by the Western Association of Schools and Colleges. Castilleja was named one of the Bay Area's Best Private Schools by San Jose Magazine.

Castilleja is recognized as the 18th best private high school and the #2 girls' high school in the United States by Niche.com in their 2023 rankings.

== Notable alumnae ==
- Amy Chow, Olympic gold medalist in gymnastics, pediatrician
- Beatrice Judd Ryan, art dealer, curator
- Carolina Isakson de Barco, former First Lady of Colombia (1986-1990)
- Grace Slick, singer and songwriter
- Helen Katharine Forbes, 1908 graduate, muralist and painter
- Josie Maran, actress and model
- Laura Arrillaga-Andreessen, philanthropist; married to billionaire Marc Andreessen
- Nancy Ditz, Olympic marathon runner
- Pansy Ho, Macau-born heiress and operator of casinos
- Penny Pritzker, philanthropist; U.S. Secretary of Commerce and member of the Pritzker family.
- Tori Anthony, pole vaulter
