= Leadership High School =

Coordinates: 37°43′17.4″N 122°26′41.6″W

Leadership High School is a public charter high school located in San Francisco. Founded in 1997, Leadership or "LHS" was California's first start-up charter high school. The school provides a college-preparatory curriculum and focuses on leadership development and social justice.

During the school's first two years, it operated out of Golden Gate University. It then moved to the Excelsior District and occupied an elementary school facility owned by San Francisco Unified School District. In January 2007, the school was forced to move from that location, because the building was determined to not be earthquake-safe. Between January 2007 and June 2008, the school shared a facility with Philip and Sala Burton High School. Between August 2008 and spring 2015, the school shared a facility with James Denman Middle School, exclusively occupying the top floor of the building. As of Spring 2015, Leadership is again occupying its original Excelsior District site, after SFUSD completed a modernization project there. The current address of the school is 350 Seneca Avenue, San Francisco, CA.

The school enrolls approximately 270 students. By 2012, there were over 500 graduates, with over 95% going on to college.

== cs ==
White	Latino	Asian	African American	Pacific Islander	American Indian	Two or More Races
1%	70%	7%	16%	0.4%	0%	4%

According to U.S. News & World Report, 99% of Leadership's student body is "of color," with 73% of the student body coming from an economically disadvantaged household, determined by student eligibility for California's Reduced-price meal program.

== See also ==
- San Francisco County high schools
