= Pacific Rim International School =

School in California, United States

Coordinates: 37°34′46″N 122°20′8.5″W

- CA 94403; United States

Information
- Established: 1989; 37 years ago
- Age range: 3 months - 18 years old
- Language: English; Mandarin; Japanese; Spanish
- Website: www.printschool.org

The Pacific Rim International School (PRINTS) is an independent school for all grades of pre-collegiate education located in San Mateo, California and Emeryville, California in the United States. The school is quadrilingual, educating students in English, Mandarin, Japanese, and Spanish.

== History ==
The school was founded as a Montessori Mandarin-English bilingual school in 1989.

A Japanese-English section was opened in 1995, and a Spanish-English section was opened in 2021.
