= Mid-Peninsula High School =

Coordinates: 37°28′35″N 122°09′08″W

- Menlo Park, California

Information
- Type: Independent non-profit non-sectarian coeducational college preparatory high school
- Opened: 1979
- Athletics conference: CIF Central Coast Section
- Team name: Dragons

Mid-Peninsula High School (Mid-Pen) is an independent non-profit and non-sectarian coeducational college preparatory high school located in Menlo Park, California.

== History ==
Mid-Pen was founded in 1979 by Phil Bliss and Herman Ohme after Cubberley High School in Palo Alto was closed due to budget cuts. Perceiving a need for alternatives to the public system, Bliss and Ohme began advocating for students experiencing difficulty or dissatisfaction in the public school system or who had undiagnosed learning differences.

Ohme began schooling the first three Mid-Pen students in his living room in early 1980. Herman and Bliss soon leased space at the recently closed Cubberley High School and by the end of the 1979–1980 academic year, the school had 40 students and one graduate. Because Proposition 13 caused many public school districts to abandon summer school, Mid-Peninsula experienced a very high enrollment for summer school in 1980, which translated into more students for the following fall semester.

In response to this increased enrollment, the school's founders leased a new Mid-Peninsula High School site on Ross Road in Palo Alto. After five years, this site was scheduled for demolition, so the school relocated to the 870 N. California Avenue campus in Palo Alto. After 15 years, that site was reclaimed by the Palo Alto Unified School District.

In 1996, a student drove onto the schoolyard and began shooting, hitting another student in the leg, before shooting himself in the head. The student who was shot recovered, while the shooter died.

Mid-Peninsula had its first capital campaign and purchased and remodeled a commercial building at 1340 Willow Road in Menlo Park. It opened to students on January 31, 2001. The two-story structure features a large patio, grassy playing field, a gym, art studio, science labs and wireless technology. In 2001, student population was 140 and staff and faculty numbered 21.

In a letter to the editor of the San Francisco Chronicle (Oct. 6, 2006), Douglas C. Thompson, head of the school, wrote that the goal of a high school should be to support a student-centered process. “Someone who is eager to try new things, able to work in a group, able to learn about his or her world and able to express in words what he or she has learned, is indeed an educated person. It is sad that we have moved so far away from those simple goals,” he wrote.

== Academics ==
Mid-Peninsula's curriculum meets standards of admission for both the University of California and the California State University institutions as well as private institutions of higher learning. Mid-Pen is fully accredited by the Western Association of Schools and Colleges (WASC) and the California Association of Independent Schools (CAIS). The school focuses on individualized learning approaches and employs flexible programming to accommodate various learning styles and reduce stress. Class sizes are typically smaller than 15 students.

Mid-Peninsula's variable credit program grants academic credit based on the quantity of work, while grades are based on the quality of work. Emphasis is placed on personal motivation, character and self-discipline.

== Athletics ==
Mid-Peninsula is a Division V school, has been a member of the Central Coast Section (CCS) for 20 years, and is also a member of the Private School Athletic League (PSAL). The school has several championships for soccer, baseball and basketball.

Mid-Peninsula employs a no-cut policy for all team sports (however, individual playing time is determined by attendance, performance and attitude). Volleyball, soccer and basketball are offered for boys and girls, while baseball is offered for boys and softball is offered for girls. Cross country is co-educational.
