= Palm Valley School =

Location
- 35525 Da Vall Drive; Rancho Mirage, California; United States
- 33°47′28″N 116°26′30″W

Information
- Type: Private
- Motto: Paratus Vitae (Prepared for Life)
- Established: 1952
- Closed: 2026
- NCES School ID: 00082006
- Faculty: 60.0 (on FTE basis)
- Grades: Preschool–12
- Enrollment: 350 (2024-2025)
- Student to teacher ratio: 10.3:1
- Mascot: Firebird
- Website: www.pvs.org

Palm Valley School was a private college-preparatory, secular and co-educational school located in Rancho Mirage, California, United States. It was founded in 1952 in Palm Springs, CA. The school moved to Rancho Mirage in 1992. In June 2026, Palm Valley School’s Board of Trustees officially announced the school’s indefinite closure.

The school served all grades from Preschool through Grade 12 on 34 acres of campus in Rancho Mirage, CA. The campus features separate campuses and buildings for each division with a total enrollment of 270 students as of 2017.

- Preschool (6 weeks – 4 years)
- Lower School (Grades K – 5th)
- Middle School (Grades 6 – 8)
- Upper School (Grades 9 – 12)

The average class size is under 20 with a student to teacher ratio of approx. 1:12. The College Counseling program graduates 100% of the senior class and 100% get accepted to college and university. The motto is "Paratus Vitae" ("Prepared for Life").

== History ==
The Palm Valley School was founded in 1952 on a property four miles outside the city of Palm Springs by Mr. and Mrs. J. Blake Field, with students coming from across the Coachella Valley. In 1992, the school moved to a new 34-acre campus in the heart of Rancho Mirage, near the center of the valley, within reach of Palm Springs, Palm Desert, and La Quinta. The curriculum was college-preparatory, non-denominational and co-educational, and taught children from three to eighteen. All of the school's graduates were qualified to go on to four-year colleges.

Marywood Country Day School (1979–2005) was founded in 1979 by Dr. Mary O’Neill in La Quinta. Grades were added each year, and by 1983 it was an independent, co-educational, non-sectarian school going up to Grade 5, with 35 children, and Dr. O’Neill incorporated it as a non-profit charitable organization. By 1985, it had outgrown its two-acre campus, and in the summer of 1986 moved to 19 acres at Clancy Lane, Rancho Mirage, soon adding early childhood and middle school programs, taking it to a preschool through eighth-grade independent school. In 2005, Marywood Country Day School merged with Palm Valley and the result was a new Marywood-Palm Valley School on the Palm Valley School campus. The Phoenix or Firebird was chosen as the new school's symbol, referring to a rebirth.

In July 2013, the Board of Trustees changed the school’s name from Marywood-Palm Valley to the Palm Valley School, but to honor the Marywood name the Lower School became the Marywood Lower School. In 2014, a new Upper School campus was opened.

In May 2026, the school filed for Chapter 11 bankruptcy protection, citing a decline in student enrollment and a possible cease of operations entirely. On May 6, 2026, the school had announced that an anonymous donor was in the process of donating enough money to get the school through the 2026-2027 school year.

In June 2026, the school’s Board of Trustees announced that the donation had ‘fell through’ and that Palm Valley School’s 74-year legacy would officially end on June 30, 2026.

== Notable alumni ==
- Alia Shawkat (did not graduate)
- Bobbie Gentry
- Paris Hilton (did not graduate)
