= Russian Math Tutors =

- Silicon Valley, California; United States

Information
- Type: Private
- Established: February 2020
- Founder: Alexander Kolchinsky
- Website: russianmathtutors.com

Russian Math Tutors is an online math tutoring platform for elementary, middle, and high school students. The platform was founded in February 2020 in Silicon Valley, California by Alexander Kolchinsky.

== History ==
Alexander Kolchinsky is an entrepreneur, software developer, and tutor. Kolchinsky immigrated to the United States from the Soviet Union in 1974. Educated in a Soviet school, he favors Soviet methods of teaching mathematics. Kolchinsky founded Russian Math Tutors to make elements of the Soviet style of teaching mathematics accessible to students in elementary, middle, and high schools in the United States.
