= Cambrian Academy =

Location
- 4340 Almaden Expressway; San Jose, California 95118; United States
- 37°15′42″N 121°55′59″W

Information
- Dean: Jesse Warner
- Headmaster: Dave Delgado
- Grades: 6–12
- Average class size: 7
- Student to teacher ratio: 8:1 to 12:1
- Sports: Golf, Tennis, Motorsports, Soccer, Sailing
- Accreditation: Cambrian Academy is fully accredited by the Western Association of Schools and Colleges (WASC).
- Website: cambrianacademy.org

Cambrian Academy is a private school in San Jose, California, founded in 2008 by Dave Delgado.

== Private College Preparatory School ==
Cambrian Academy serves students in Grades 6-12. Although described as an Advanced Middle School and College Preparatory High School, it is organized as a continuum spanning Grades 6-12. Students are placed in classes based on ability rather than age, so the grade-level distinction is less important than the individual student's path to college.

== International School ==
The international school at Cambrian Academy, also known as Cambrian International Academy (CIA), enrolls foreign students from 6th through 12th grade. CIA's stated objective for foreign students is to quickly develop their English language skills so they can be mainstreamed into the academy's general student population. This prevents foreign students from becoming isolated, as happens too often in many ESL programs.

== Accreditation ==
The school is accredited by the Accrediting Commission of the Western Association of Schools and Colleges.
