= Alameda Community Learning Center =

Coordinates: 37.779°N 122.2875°W

- 1900 Third Street; Alameda, California, 94501

Information
- Former name: Arthur Andersen Community Learning Center
- Type: Independent charter
- Motto: Educating the Leaders of Tomorrow
- Established: 1992
- Staff: 36
- Enrollment: 303
- Colors: Purple and gray
- Mascot: Harold the Hawk
- Lead Facilitator: Doron Markus
- Website: www.alamedaclc.org

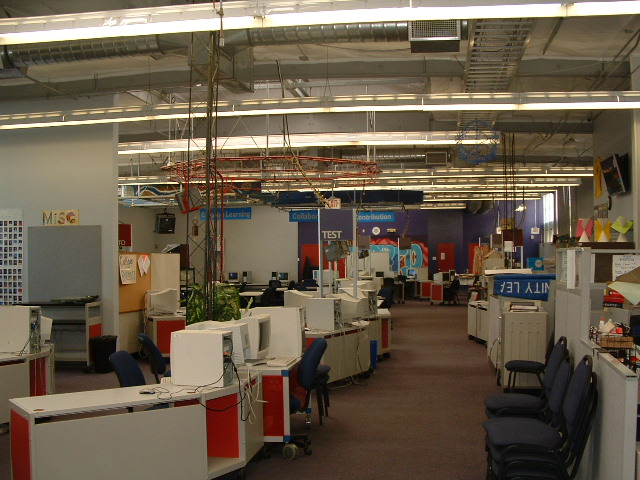
This is an image of what the Center looked like prior to the move to the current site at 1900 3rd street. The Center no longer exists in this capacity.

Alameda Community Learning Center (ACLC), formerly known as Arthur Andersen Community Learning Center, is a 6th–12th grade public charter school located in Alameda, California, United States. It currently shares a campus with its sister school, Nea Community Learning Center. As a school ACLC was founded on the idea of democracy and student-led education.

== Mission ==
To empower all youth to take ownership of their educational experience, to celebrate their diverse community, and to actively participate as members in a democratic society.

== History ==
The Alameda Community Learning Center was created as a school in which the Graduate Profile of the Alameda Unified School District could live and breathe. The Graduate Profile is a document that was created at a visioning conference held by the AUSD in partnership with Arthur Andersen in 1992. Andersen funded the start-up costs for the school. After its first five years, the school became a charter school.

In 2014 ACLC moved its campus, which was shared with Encinal High School at the time, to its current location on 1900 3rd street. This provided learners with easy access to college classes at the nearby College of Alameda.

== Leadership and self-governance ==
=== Judicial committee ===
The JC system, also known as the judicial committee, is made up of a group of five students elected by the student body and one teacher selected by the faculty. JC enforces the rules of the school by hearing cases submitted by learners and facilitators and deciding on appropriate consequences to specific actions. The findings of the JC are binding on all parties involved and may result in further action, including suspension or expulsion, if necessary. The JC meets five times each week to consider issues related to infringement of rules codified in the Rule Book developed by learners over the years.

=== Leadership ===
Leadership is one of the courses offered at ACLC. Leadership is similar to a student council, It works to plan events and activities. The group meets three times a week and works closely with a facilitator to create school spirit by running Contemporary Community Citizenship (CCC) and other events. Its responsibilities include codifying and enforcing rules, coordinating activities and field trips, and coordinating and facilitating the annual ACLC Constitutional Convention.

== Courses ==
ACLC has a set of graduation requirements designed to meet University of California requirements.

ACLC's hosts a large range of elective classes. As of 2024 these classes include art, digital art, digital music, digital video production, computer science, pre-calculus, visual communications, leadership (student government), Spanish, judicial committee and creative technologies 1 & 2.

ACLC also offers honors courses to students. As of 2024 ACLC offers biology, English 3 & 4, pre-calculus, US history, and US government honors courses.

== School culture ==
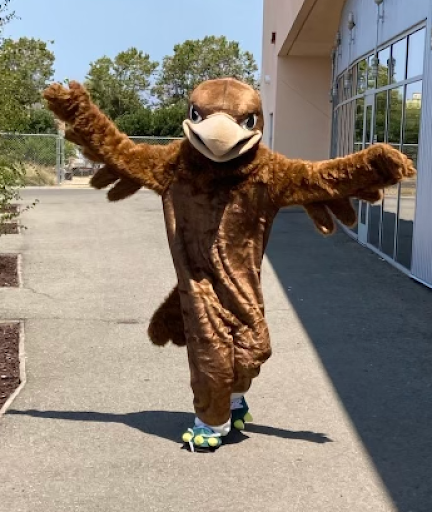
ACLC's mascot costume as of 2022

ACLC refers to students and teachers as "learners" and "facilitators", respectively.

ACLC's mascot is a hawk, and its school colors are purple and grey. The hawk's name is Harold, as determined by a vote in August 2024.

As of 2021, ACLC learners produce a weekly news program called CCC News. It is primarily used to convey school-related information and events to learners. It was created by Saoirse Foltz and Alexander Hayden, who hosted it throughout the 2021-2022 schoolyear. Its hosts during the 2022–2023 school year were Samuel Yonas and Isaac Lu. Its hosts during the 2023–2024 school year were Fionn Rooney and Finley Collins. Its hosts during the 2024-2025 schoolyear were Benjamin Stoffmacher and Dashiell Young. Currently it is hosted by Jacob Mata and Caitlin Walker.
