= Calvine High School =

School in California, US

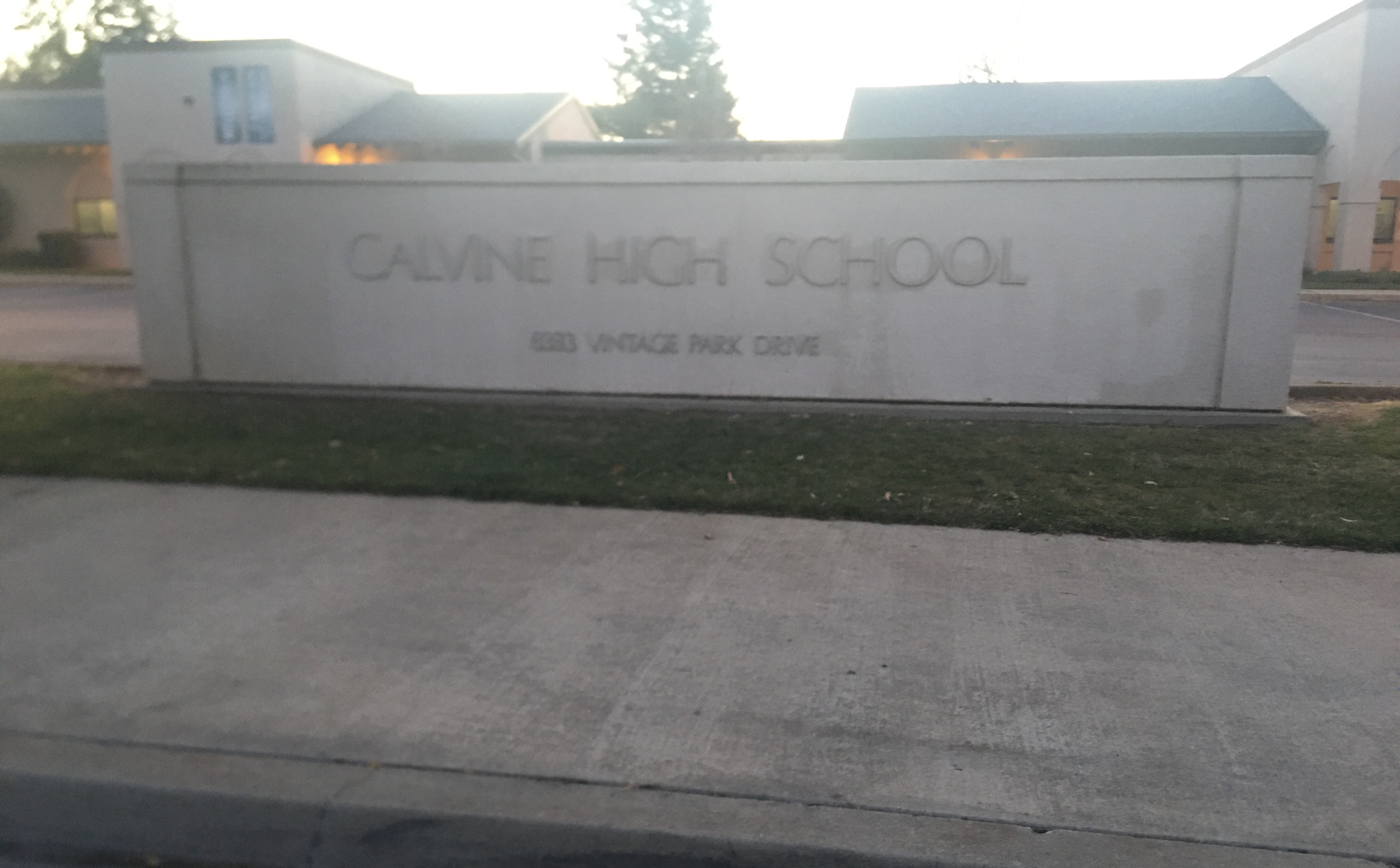

Location
- 8333 Vintage Park Dr. Elk Grove, Sacramento County, California; United States of America; 38.45331°N 121.37877°W

Information
- School type: Continuation High School
- Opened: 1980
- School district: Elk Grove Unified School District
- Principal: Tobi Page
- Teaching staff: 11.50 (FTE)
- Grades: 9-12
- Enrollment: 159 (2023-2024)
- Student to teacher ratio: 13.83

Calvine High School is a continuation high school located in Sacramento County, California directly next to Elk Grove, California. It is part of the Elk Grove Unified School District.

== School history ==
Calvine gets its name from the California Vineyard Company, a huge grape growing enterprise of the early 1900s, located east of Bradshaw Road. Calvine Road leads from what is now Highway 99 to the land belonging to the company. Calvine was the outgrowth of two smaller high schools. They were Omochumnes High, with its Miwok Indian name, located near what is now the Education Center, and Pioneer High, which had been at two different locations during its lifespan. On April 25, 1992.

== Extra-curricular activities ==
Calvine students have participated in many extra curricular activities such as Marsh Madness, which was a youth leadership program. This program helps train Calvine students to mentor elementary school students on all aspects of existing natural resources. Some other activities that Calvine students experience are things like “In a Blink of an Eye” which shows students what can happen when teenagers participate in illegal street racing; which is the loss of one's life. Another activity that students participate in is the trip to the nimbus fish hatchery where students observe the final stages of salmon migration.

Calvine students participate in a rigorous service learning program using nearby areas for environmental studies. Students learn in a non-classroom environment while taking part in community enhancing projects fostering real world learning.

== School staff ==
The school currently employs eleven teachers.

== Goals ==
Calvine High School is a credit recovery program for credit deficient students. Students are no longer required to pass the California High School Exit Exam.
