= Ventura County Christian School =

Private school in California, United States

Coordinates: 34°16′42″N 119°16′33″W

Ventura County Christian School is a private, nondenominational Christian school in Ventura, California. VCCS began in 1994 as a high school only (Grades 9–12). In 2003 it began hosting all grades K-12, and moved to a separate building on MacMillan Avenue. It currently has approximately 90 high school students, and an average class size of 15 students.

In 2023 the school moved to a new location on Teloma Dr. in Ventura.
