= Anacapa School =

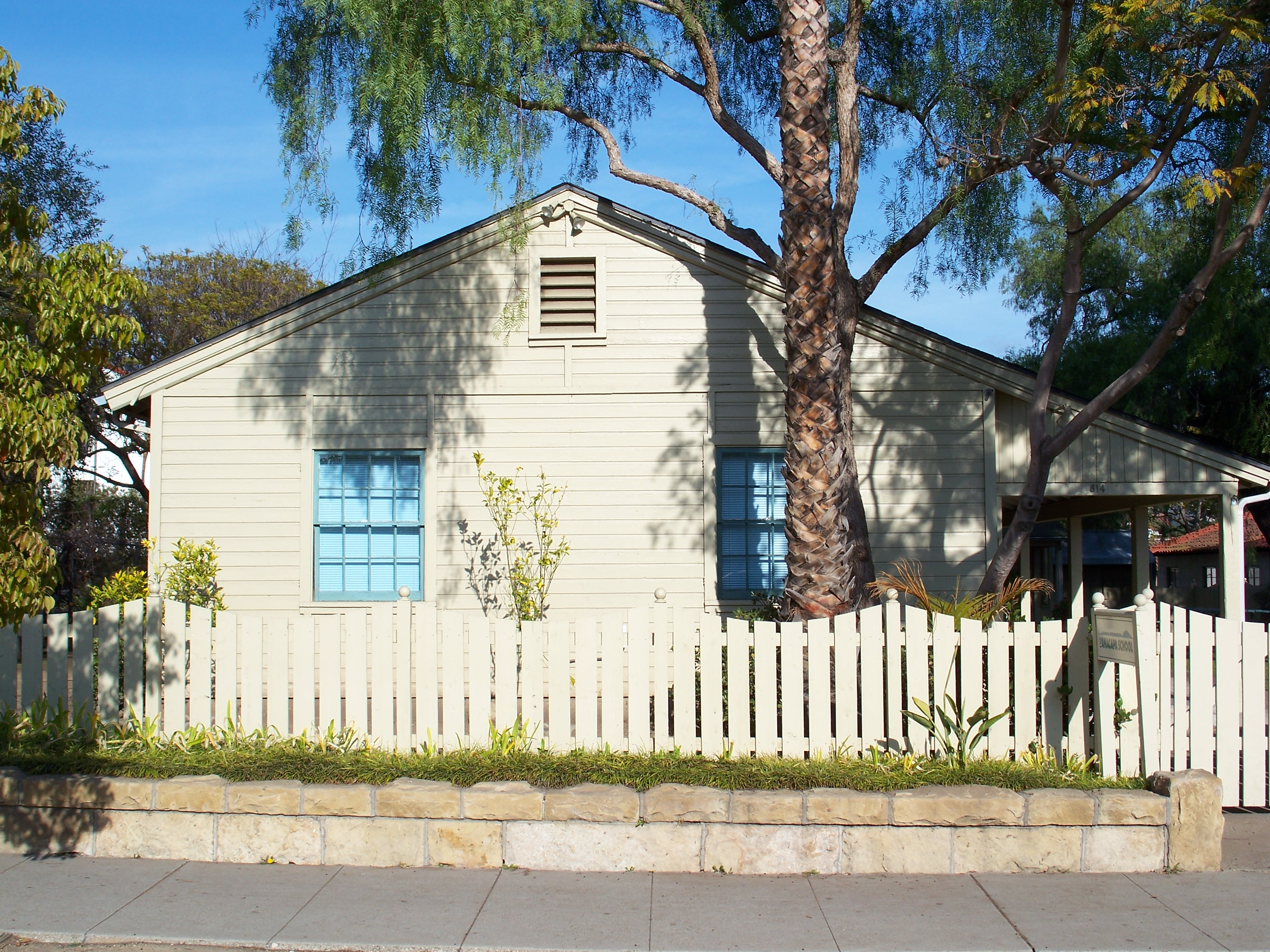

Location
- 814 Santa Barbara Street; Santa Barbara, California; United States; 34.422318°N 119.697305°W

Information
- Motto: Grades 7-12 like no one else.
- Established: 1981
- Founder: Gordon Sichi
- Category: Independent
- Head of school: Dylan Minor
- Faculty: 15
- Grades: 7–12
- Gender: Co-educational
- Enrollment: (approx.)
- Mascot: Island Fox
- Accreditation: WASC
- Website: Official website

Anacapa School is an independent, secular coeducational middle school and high school in Santa Barbara, California. It has an enrollment cap of 72 students, with a concentration on personal attention from faculty. It features an outdoor education program and high college acceptance rates. It is fully accredited with the Western Association of Schools and Colleges.

== History ==
Anacapa School was founded in 1981 in Santa Barbara. It is located at 814 Santa Barbara Street, in a building that was once a World War II war hospital, as well as the Anna S.C. Blake School for Girls, and Santa Barbara Junior College. In 1981, the students, teachers and parents of the Santa Barbara Middle School decided that they wanted an independent high school where they could continue their education with a philosophy similar to SBMS. Two students and their parents were instrumental: Becky Hartzell and Windy Wagner. Several teachers and parents took on the task to start the new school: Ann Bennett, Kitty Hansen, and Bob Everhart. The board was formed (Tom Taft, Frank Sarguis, Stan Deck, Ann Bennett, Judy Bennett, and several others). Gordon Sichi was hired as the new headmaster, and Kitty Hansen was hired as the office manager. There were sixteen students, and the school was started in the Alhecama Theater Complex at 910 Santa Barbara Street.

== Administration ==
Mari Talkin assumed the role of head of school in 2023.
