= Kings Community School =

Location
- 146 W. Highland; Hanford, California; United States; 36°18′37″N 119°39′7″W

Information
- Type: Public
- Established: 1983
- Closed: 2017
- School district: Kings County Office of Education
- Principal: Janet Schales
- Faculty: 6.0 (on FTE basis)
- Grades: 7 to 12
- Enrollment: 164 (2008–09)
- Student to teacher ratio: 27.3:1
- Website: Kings Community School

Kings Community School was an alternative high school located in Hanford, California.
