= DCP El Primero High School =

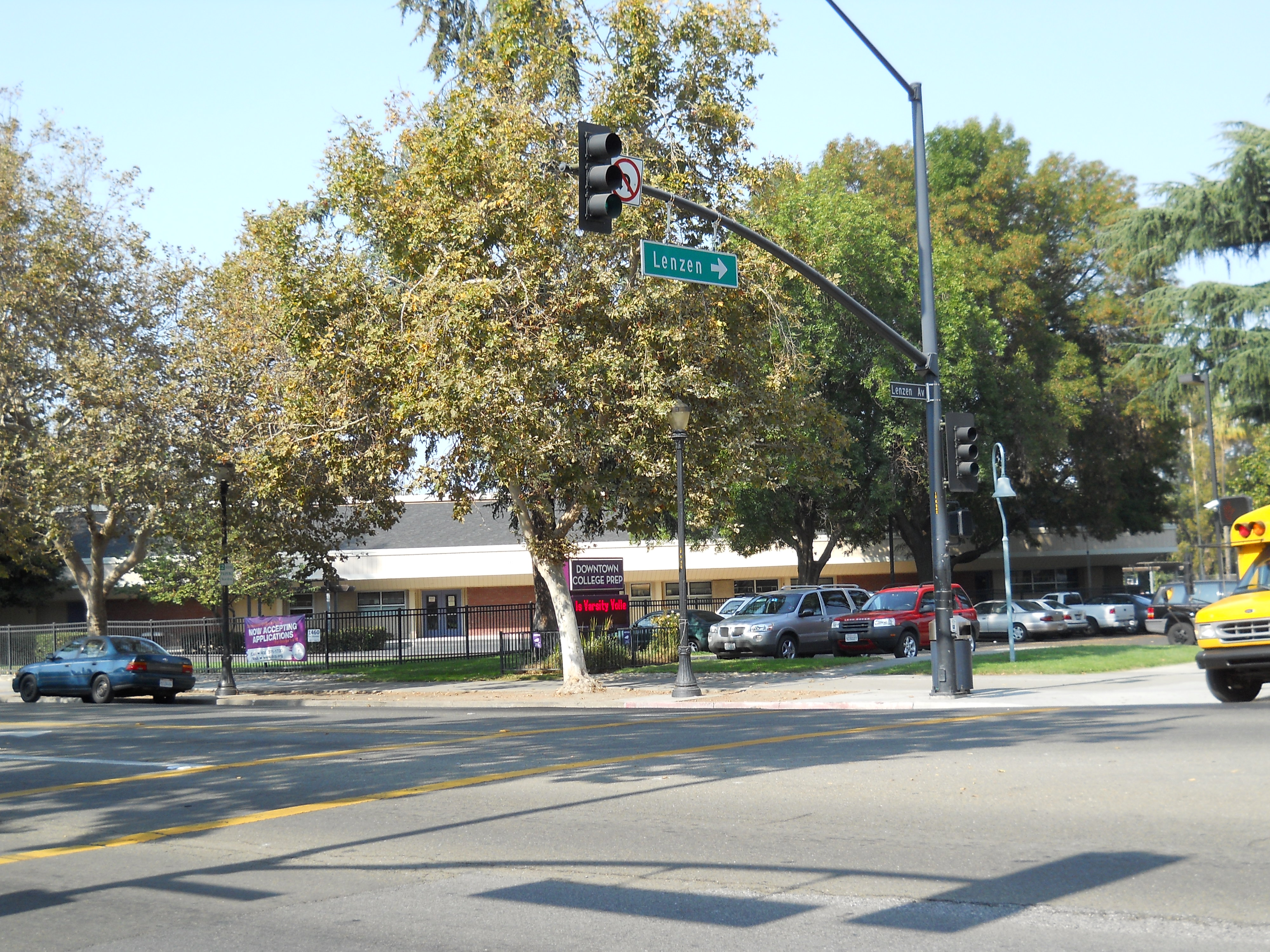
- DCP El Primero's former location on The Alameda

Location
- 1402 Monterey Hwy; San Jose, California 95110; United States; 37.316348°N 121.872908°W

Information
- School type: Charter public high school
- Opened: 2000
- School district: San Jose Unified School District
- Director: Pete Settelmayer
- Grades: 9–12
- Enrollment: 400
- Colors: Purple, orange, and white
- Team name: Lobos Athletics Teams Compete is the Private School Athletic League (P.S.A.L) in the Central Coast Section (C.C.S)
- Website: dcp.org/dcp-el-primero-high-school/

DCP El Primero High School is a public charter high school in San Jose, California. Its mission is to prepare first-generation students, particularly low-income Latinos, for college success. Originally called Downtown College Prep, it opened in 2000 as the first charter school in Santa Clara County and has since become the flagship school of the Downtown College Prep (DCP) family of schools.

== History ==
The school was founded by Greg Lippman and by Jennifer Andaluz, who became Executive Director. When it was granted a charter by San Jose Unified School District late in 1999, it was the first charter school in Santa Clara County; an elementary school opened the same year. After a summer program testing teaching concepts and forming the first group of students, the school opened in fall 2000 with 102 9th-grade students, split between two sites in downtown San Jose, near the San Jose State University campus: St. Paul's Methodist church (in 2007 the site of the launch of a charter elementary school, Rocketship One) and a YWCA. In each of the following three years, a grade and another approximately 100 freshman students were added. The school received considerable help in its formation from Father Mateo Sheedy, pastor of Sacred Heart Catholic church, and its advisory board and eventual board of trustees included then-mayor of San Jose Ron Gonzales, Robert Caret, then-president of San Jose State, Tony Ridder, CEO of Knight Ridder, then headquartered in San Jose, and Greg Jamison, president of the San Jose Sharks hockey team. The mayor and the priest both spoke at the opening celebration on August 30, 2000.

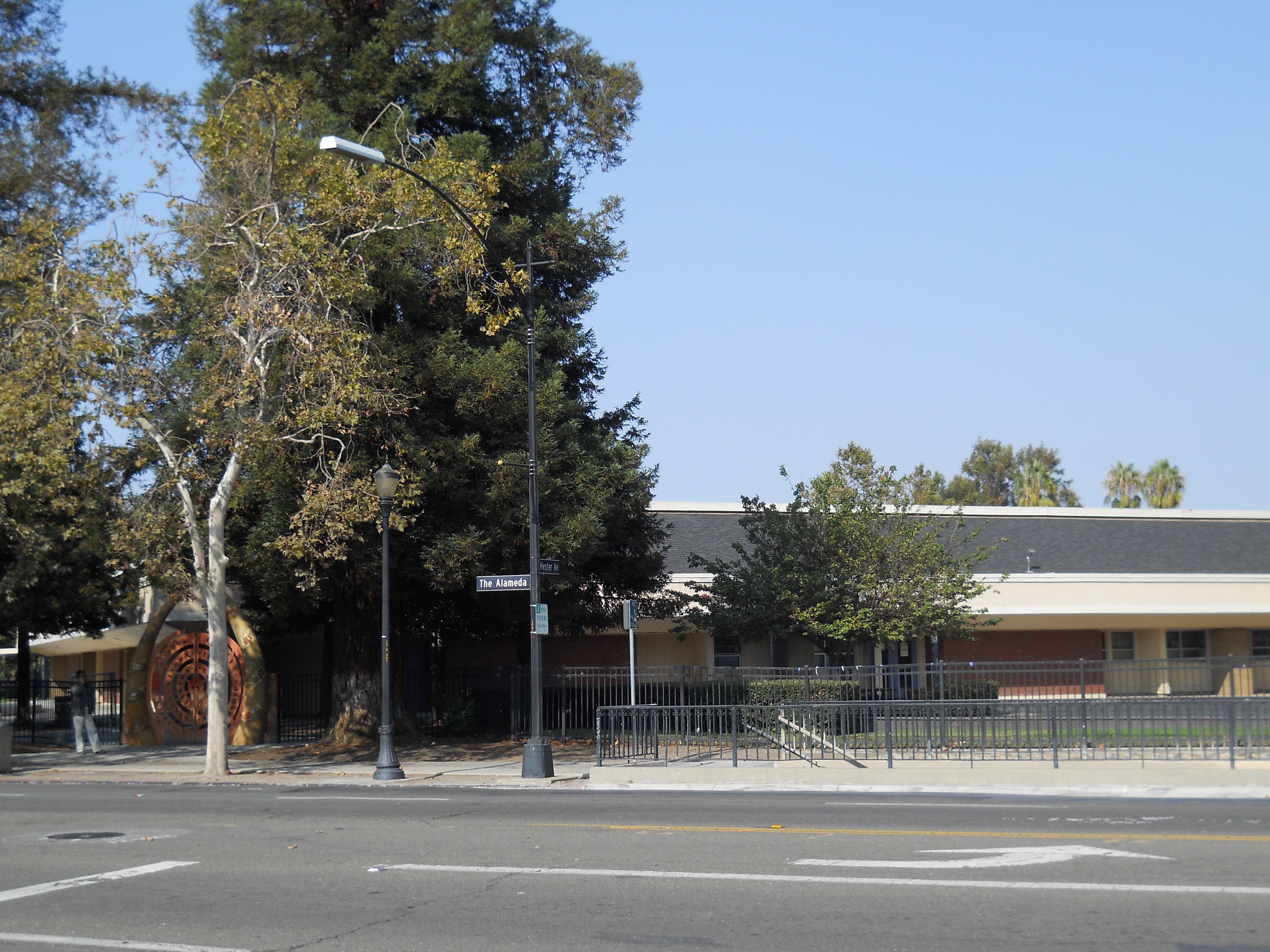
View of the school from across The Alameda, 2012; Spirit Gate on the left

Of the first freshman class, approximately one third transferred out, 11 moved away, 6 were expelled, and approximately half graduated, all of whom were accepted by four-year colleges. In 2007–08, the school had a 0.9% drop-out rate and a 100% graduation rate. As of March 2015 more than 600 students had graduated and gone on to college.

Initial plans of constructing a school building on land donated by San Jose State fell through. Instead, after briefly being split between three sites, the school moved in October 2002 to a converted fitness center, and in December 2005 to the former building of Hester Elementary School, on The Alameda. The building was gutted to create a "great area" and other new spaces; Downtown College Prep students and their math teacher assisted the architect, Bill Gould, in laying out the partitions for the interior rebuilding.

Gould had been the designer with Glen Rogers of the Spirit Gate, a San Jose Public Art Program project completed in 2000 consisting of an ornamental gateway on The Alameda with concrete posts resembling elephant tusks and inspirational "power words" such as "family" and "dream" stencilled out of the circular gate itself. Hester students chose the words, and the mosaics that wrap around the posts are based on their drawings.

For the 2016–17 school year, the high school moved to larger quarters in a former lumber and building supply store on Monterey Highway.

== Affiliated schools ==
In 2008, Downtown College Prep opened an affiliated middle school (6th–8th grade) in Alviso, in North San Jose. For the 2012–13 school year, this closed and was replaced by an affiliated middle school in Alum Rock, on the eastern edge of the city. As planned, this subsequently became a combined middle and high school. A second middle school authorized by San Jose Unified School District opened in fall 2014.
