= San Pasqual Valley High School =

Coordinates: 32.7495°N 114.5979°W

Location
- 676 Baseline Road; Winterhaven, California 92283; United States

Information
- School type: Public high school
- School district: San Pasqual Valley Unified School District
- Principal: Juan Morales
- Teaching staff: 11.89 (FTE)
- Grades: 9-12
- Enrollment: 191 (2023–2024)
- Student to teacher ratio: 16.07
- Color: Royal blue/maize gold
- Athletics conference: Arizona Interscholastic Association 1A
- Mascot: Warrior
- Website: www.spvusd.org/schools/san-pasqual-valley-high-school/

San Pasqual Valley High School (also known as San Pasqual High School) is a high school in Winterhaven, California, near Yuma, Arizona. It is the only high school in the San Pasqual Valley Unified School District. It is also the only out-of-state member of the Arizona Interscholastic Association.
