= Thomas More School (San Jose, California) =

Location
- 1565 South White Road; San Jose, (Santa Clara County), California 95127; United States; 37°20′54″N 121°48′47″W

Information
- Type: Private, Coeducational
- Motto: Fidelis Veritati Dei (Faith in the Word of God.)
- Religious affiliation: Roman Catholic
- Established: 1978
- Principal: John Vogel
- Faculty: 19 (2006)
- Grades: K-12
- Colors: Navy Blue, Silver and White
- Team name: Knights
- Yearbook: TMS Yearbook
- Website: www.thomasmoreschool.org

Thomas More School is an American private school in San Jose, California operated by the Society of Saint Pius X providing a traditional Roman Catholic education. From its website Mission's Statement, "The mission of Thomas More School is auxiliary to the mission of the Catholic Church, which is to lead man to union with God as his last end. Thomas More School was founded in 1977 in order to inspire and guide children in the true purpose of education. Man was created to know, love and serve God in this world and to be happy with Him forever in the next. Consequently, it is the goal of Thomas More School to provide the children of Catholic families with a thorough education founded upon traditional principles of education. This way, they will be formed into true Catholics, learning to love and serve God in every aspect of their daily lives and be led to union with God in their ultimate end.

== History ==
Established in 1978, the school was previously known as Saint Thomas Aquinas School, and had also been referred to by the name St. Thomas More School.

Until the campus moved to the current location in 2004, the school was located in buildings on the grounds of the San Jose Flea Market, which is also owned by the Bumb family. At the same time as this move the school shortened its name to the current form.
