= The Kehillah School =

Location
- 3900 Fabian Way; Palo Alto, California; United States; 37°25′30″N 122°06′16″W

Information
- Type: Independent Coeducational Secondary
- Established: 1999
- Head of school: Daisy Pellant
- Teaching staff: 38.5 (on an FTE basis)
- Grades: 9–12
- Enrollment: 216 (2017–18)
- Student to teacher ratio: 5.6
- Campus: Suburban
- Affiliation: Jewish
- Website: kehillah.org

The Kehillah School is an independent college preparatory high school located in Palo Alto, California. "Kehillah" is a Hebrew word meaning "community."

In the fall of 2005, the school moved from its original location in San Jose to its new campus at 3900 Fabian Way, Palo Alto, where it also hosted the Keddem Congregation (Reconstructionist Judaism) for several years.

The Kehillah School (previously Kehillah Jewish High School) was founded in 1999 and opened in the fall of 2002 on the Blackford High School campus in San Jose with 32 9th grade students. Rabbi Reuven Greenvald joined Kehillah as its Head of School in the summer of 2004 and left in March 2007. He was replaced by Lillian Howard, who most recently served as the founding Head of School of the Shoshana S. Cardin School in Baltimore, Maryland. Upon Lillian Howard's retirement in June 2013, Rabbi Darren Kleinberg, Ph.D. became the Head of School. Rabbi Darren Kleinberg, Ph.D. left in the end of the 2019-2020 school year. During the 2020-2021 school year, Dr. Daisy Pellant became the new Head of the School.

Since 2002, The Kehillah School has grown from a 9th-grade class of 33 students to a community of approximately 220 students in grades 9-12. The school experienced multiple years of double-digit enrollment growth.

== Campus ==
The new 50,000-square-foot (4,600 m^{2}) campus at 3900 Fabian Way in Palo Alto, California was completed for the 2005–2006 academic year. It is situated across the street from the Taube-Koret Campus for Jewish Life, a new development for the Palo Alto JCC and the senior home. The facility was originally constructed in 1997, and was extensively remodeled in 2005. The building includes 27 classrooms, high-end physics, chemistry, biology, and computer science laboratories, music and art rooms, a photo studio, a makerspace, a library and assembly space, student and faculty work and meeting spaces, faculty and administrative office clusters, and a Beit Midrash – a room for prayer and study. The campus was most recently renovated in the summer of 2016, during which the library, theater, and student learning center were redesigned. After the COVID-19 pandemic, in the summer of 2021, the campus was renovated again to remodel all classrooms. The library, student center, and hangout spaces were also redone to look and feel more inclusive.

== Student life ==
Kehillah has many clubs including a biology club, debate club, Gender Sexuality Alliance (GSA), kindness club, and more. In addition to on campus experiences, each grade has an annual trip to destinations such as Los Angeles, Atlanta, and Israel. These trips offer students exposure to new places, education around the history of the destination, chances to volunteer with local organizations, and bonding time with their class. These trips last from five days to two weeks depending on factors like grade level, and distance traveled.

In addition to these community experiences, Kehillah provides individualized learning support to students through The Center for Learning Success. Dedicated educators from this department assist students in learning strategies, implementing Student Success Plans (SSPs), communicating with teachers, and many other services for students with learning differences as part of the student's Kehillah experience.

== Notable alumni ==
- Harris Mowbray
