= CIF Central Coast Section =

High school athletics organization

- Abbreviation: CIF-CCS
- Formation: 1965
- Type: NPO
- Legal status: Association
- Purpose: Athletic Administration
- Headquarters: 333 Piercy Road
- Location: San Jose, California, US
- Region served: Bay Area/Central Coast of California
- Members: 150 public and private schools
- Official language: English
- Commissioner: David Grissom
- Main organ: California Interscholastic Federation
- Affiliations: National Federation of State High School Associations
- Website: www.cifccs.org

The Central Coast Section (CCS) is the governing body of public and private high school athletics in the portion of California encompassing San Mateo County, Santa Clara County, Monterey County, San Benito County, Santa Cruz County and a few private schools in San Francisco. It is one of ten sections that comprise the California Interscholastic Federation (CIF).

== Conferences and leagues ==
CCS comprises the following conferences and leagues:

=== Northern Conference ===
- Peninsula Athletic League (PAL)
- Private School Athletic League (PSAL)
- West Bay Athletic League (WBAL)

=== Central Conference ===
- Blossom Valley Athletic League (BVAL)
- Santa Clara Valley Athletic League (SCVAL)
- West Catholic Athletic League (WCAL)

=== Southern Conference ===
- Pacific Coast Athletic League (PCAL)
- Santa Cruz Coast Athletic League (SCCAL)

== Sports offered ==
- Badminton
- Baseball
- Basketball
- Beach Volleyball
- Cross Country
- Field Hockey
- Flag Football, girls
- Football
- Golf, boys
- Golf, girls
- Gymnastics
- Lacrosse
- Soccer
- Softball
- Swim & Dive
- Tennis, boys
- Tennis, girls
- Track & Field
- Volleyball, boys
- Volleyball, girls
- Water Polo
- Wrestling
