= West Valley Athletic League =

High school athletic league

The West Valley Athletic League was a high school athletic league under the auspices of the CIF Central Coast Section. The league generally covered the schools of the Campbell Union High School District and Los Gatos-Saratoga Joint Union High School District. The league was formed in the mid-1960s (the league had formed by 1965) with the advent of new schools. Older schools like Campbell and Los Gatos had previously played in the Santa Clara Valley Athletic League. As schools closed the league reformatted and many of the remaining schools joined what became the West Valley Division of the Blossom Valley Athletic League.

== Members ==
The schools included:

- Blackford High School closed 1991
- Branham High School opened 1967, closed 1991, reopened 1999
- Camden High School closed 1980
- Campbell High School closed 1980
- Del Mar High School opened 1959
- Leigh High School opened 1962
- Los Gatos High School left in 1988
- Prospect High School opened 1968
- Saratoga High School (left in 1976)
- Westmont High School opened 1964
