= Del Mar High School =

Coordinates: 37.3046°N 121.9291°W

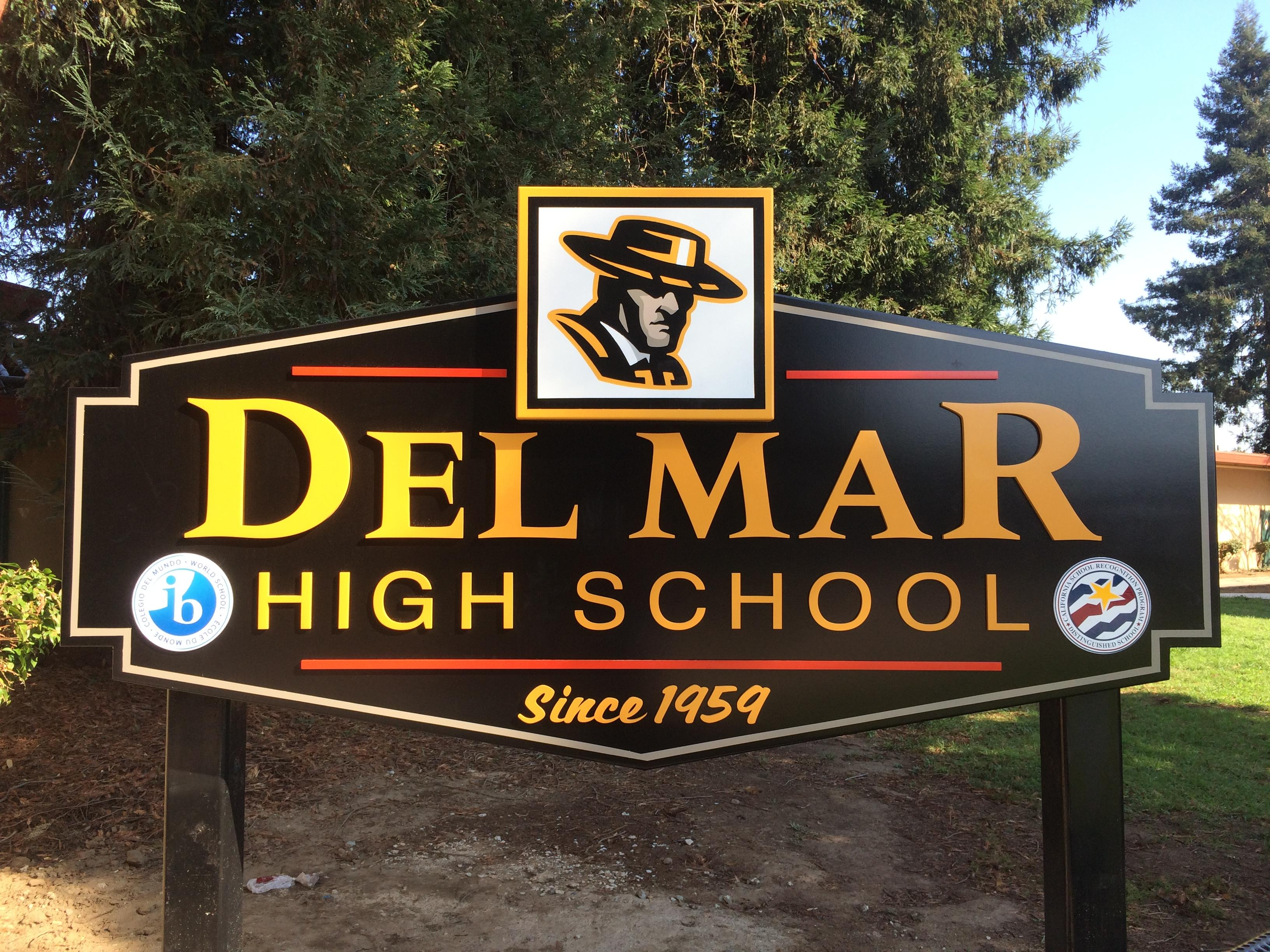
- Front sign of Del Mar
- 1224 Del Mar Avenue; San Jose, California 95128; United States

Information
- Type: Public 4-year
- Motto: Fides (Latin; meaning 'trustworthiness', 'protection')
- Established: 1959
- School district: Campbell Union High School District
- Principal: Diana Nguyen
- Faculty: 176
- Teaching staff: 65.64 (FTE)
- Enrollment: 1,350 (2024–2025)
- Student to teacher ratio: 20.57
- Colors: Black, Gold, and White
- Athletics conference: Blossom Valley Athletic League
- Mascot: Dons (a Spanish gentleman or nobleman)
- Website: Del Mar High School

Del Mar High School (DMHS) is a four-year, public secondary school established in 1959 in San Jose, California. It is part of the Campbell Union High School District, (CUHSD), the other schools in which are Branham, Leigh, Prospect, and Westmont. Most of Del Mar's students come from the Campbell Union School District's Monroe Middle School. The school serves both San Jose and Campbell, in addition to some unincorporated pockets of Santa Clara County. In 2016, Del Mar became an International Baccalaureate school. The first class who started the diploma, was the class of 2018.

The school mascot of Del Mar is "The Don", and the colors are black, gold, and, officially, white. As of 2024 the school principal is Diana Nguyen. In recent years, the school's academic scores have risen significantly, most notably by reaching an API (Academic Performance Index) score of 720 in 2011, a jump of 122 points since 2004. In 2007, it was officially deemed a "California Distinguished School".

== History ==
The CUHSD began construction on the Del Mar campus in 1957; it was established in 1959. The first school year began in September 1959 with the first class graduating in June 1960. Del Mar was the first complete four year high school in California to be constructed by the state's aid building fund, at a cost of $3 million. The dedication of the new school was attended by California Governor Edmund G. "Pat" Brown.

The superintendent of the CUHSD at the time of the school's construction in 1957, Larry Hill, made a deal to get the 'clinker' bricks from the yard at a discount, to use in the schools the district was building at the time. As a result, all of Del Mar's original buildings have a great deal of brick in them.

== Athletics and extracurricular activities ==
=== Sports ===
Awards lined up at the 2007 Feste Del Mar

Del Mar sports teams compete in the Blossom Valley Athletic League, divisions of which are 'A league': Mount Hamilton Division, 'B league': Santa Teresa Division, and 'C league': West Valley Division. BVAL falls in California’s Central Coast Section, known as CCS. The school's sport program includes football, flag football, soccer, basketball, cross country, volleyball, field hockey, tennis, golf, wrestling, baseball, softball, badminton, swimming & diving, and track & field.

Del Mar sports teams have won many League and CCS championships over the course of the school's history—the banners commemorating those titles hang in the school's big gym. In the 2005–2006 school year, several teams won the title of League Champions, including football, JV boys' soccer, badminton, and girls' swimming. The 2006–2007 season was no different, as boys' basketball won the league, as did the ladies soccer team, who went on to CCS. In the spring of 2007, the track & field team sent the first relay team to CCS in 10 years, but fell short of winning league to Andrew Hill. Field hockey has won league titles in 2001–2002 and 2008–2009, 2009–2010, 2010–2011. In fall 2007, the football team made history by going 10–0, a feat that has never accomplished in the school's history, and also was able to host the first round of CCS Playoffs at home for the first time in 11 years. In 2007–2008 Del Mar's track team won the League championship going a 7–0 in League. In 2009, the girls basketball team won a school-record 21 games and made it to the second round of CCS playoffs. Girls basketball is the most consistent team, in terms of reaching the playoffs.

=== Performing arts ===
Del Mar's marching band is officially named the Del Mar High School Marching Band. In the fall, they host the annual Feste Del Mar Band Review, which holds competitions for Concert, Jazz, and Marching bands.

=== Clubs ===
Several of the above-mentioned associations are considered 'clubs', but the list of the more traditional meet-during-lunch clubs on campus includes C.S.F. (California Scholarship Federation), Photo Club, International Club, Key Club, Juventud Latina, GSA (Gay Straight Alliance), Uprising, and Ecology Club.

== Grading ==
Del Mar operates on a normal A through F system, with minor variation among teachers on which percentages correspond to which letter grades. Progress reports are sent home every six weeks, and final grades at the end of each semester, of which there are two. Finals for the first semester generally fall on or around January 29, and second semester finals are around June 14, with seniors' generally the week earlier.

=== Schedule ===
Del Mar, along with the rest of the CUHSD, is on a block schedule, with periods 1–3 on Gold days, 4–6 on Black days, zero period every day, and seventh period every day except Wednesday. This gives teachers longer uninterrupted class periods to work with. There are also minimum days at the end of each grading period (every six weeks), when regular classes get out at 12:25. Finals are given in 120 minute blocks and the 3 days of finals end at 12:20.

=== Tools ===
Del Mar, along with the rest of the Campbell Union High School District, is set up for teachers to electronically enter their students' grades on AERIES, a program that then allows students and parents to check their grades online. Also, Del Mar is on SchoolLoop, a program that allows teachers to post homework assignments, test dates, and notes online, in addition to providing the opportunity to communicate with their students by email.

=== Community ===
Parent associations/Booster clubs at Del Mar include the Dons Club, PTA, Padres Unidos, and the Performing Arts Association. Membership in the Dons Club includes discounts to get into most athletic events that charge admission.

== Faculty ==
One of Del Mar's valedictorian medals

The administration/staff for Del Mar High School includes principal Diana Nguyen, assistant principals Loan Ly, Cedric Nguyen and David Blanco, counselors Evelyn Beas, Kristie Geist, Jenifer Martinez, and Amanda Perez, activities director Rebecca Novinfar, and athletics director Ryan Castaneda.

== Campus ==
The pool deck at Del Mar, racing pool in front, the diving well in the back corner

Del Mar's original wings on the north side of the quad, in addition to the band and drama rooms, the cafeteria/stage end of the building, the main office, teacher's lounge, library, and student services center are all original buildings in Del Mar's traditional brick. Many of these wings have been refurbished in the past several years, or are in the process of being redone.

In what used to be the senior parking lot stands the new science wing, complete with solar panels on the roof that feed back into the power grid, after serving the science wing itself. It contains six classrooms, providing physics, chemistry, biology, and integrated science classes with high ceilings, projectors, and, in room 74, a balcony.

The large and small gyms, locker rooms, and swimming pool, on the south side of the quad, are also original. The big gym, home to basketball, volleyball, badminton, and several families of small birds which build nests in the old lights in the ceiling, received a new paint job in 2006 courtesy of the Don's Club. The pool deck has two pools, the 12-foot diving well and the 6-lane pool, which is 3.5 feet at the ends and 4 in the middle. Water polo cannot be played at Del Mar because of the pool's depth, or lack thereof. There are seven tennis courts, four outdoor basketball courts, two sand volleyball courts that are rarely used, the weight room, a football practice field, a baseball diamond, three softball/baseball fields, and a large field that houses soccer. There is also the Bowl, housing the brand new artificial-turf athletic field and appropriately new rubber track which is used for field hockey, soccer, and football.

== Notable alumni ==
Notable alumni of Del Mar High School include:

- Reza Aslan — Iranian-American writer, scholar of religious studies, professor
- Adrienne Barbeau — television and film actress
- Antonio Esfandiari — professional poker player
- Desirée Goyette — two-time Grammy nominee; character voice credits include Betty Boop and Barbie
- Jennifer Granholm — former governor of Michigan and television commentator
- Jeff Langton — Award winning television and film actor; acting credits include Buffy the Vampire Slayer, Lionheart, Tango & Cash, Die Hard 2 & many others
- Mark McNamara — NBA player, Philadelphia 76ers, San Antonio Spurs, Kansas City Kings, Los Angeles Lakers and Orlando Magic
- Jim Powell - poet, translator, MacArthur Fellow
- Gary Radnich (Radunich) — sports anchor on KRON-TV and sportscaster on KNBR 680 (Radio)
- Jeff Toews — former NFL offensive tackle and guard with the Miami Dolphins
- Loren Toews — NFL player for the Pittsburgh Steelers, four-time Super Bowl winner
- Dick Vermeil — head football coach of UCLA, St. Louis Rams, and the Kansas City Chiefs, teacher at Del Mar High School in 1959
- Ryan Wieber — Emmy award-winning compositor, film director

== See also ==
- Corona del Mar High School
- Del Oro High School
