= Stan Bunger =

American broadcast journalist

Stan Bunger (born June 8, 1956 in San Francisco, California) is an American broadcast journalist and author. He was the morning co-anchor at KCBS All News 740 AM/106.9 FM in San Francisco from 2000 until his retirement in 2021. He first joined KCBS in 1982 and served until 1992, returning in 2000.

He is the author of Mornings With Madden: My Radio Life with an American Legend, an account of his many years on the air with football legend John Madden.

Bunger plays rhythm guitar in the Eyewitness Blues Band.

Bunger is a 1973 graduate of Leigh High School in San Jose, California, a 1975 graduate of West Valley College in Saratoga, California, and received his B.A. in 1977 from the Broadcast and Electronic Communication Arts (BECA) Department at San Francisco State University. He was inducted to the Bay Area Radio Hall of Fame in 2010 and to the San Francisco State University Alumni Hall of Fame in 2011.

Bunger’s broadcasting career began in 1977 at KRKC Radio in King City, California. He has also been employed as a broadcast journalist at:

- KVML Radio in Sonora, California
- KTHO Radio in South Lake Tahoe, California
- KXRX Radio in San Jose, California
- KNTV Television in San Jose, California
- KFBK Radio in Sacramento, California
- KRLD Radio in Dallas, Texas
- KICU-TV in San Jose, California
- KRON-TV in San Francisco, California
