= Campbell High School (California) =

School in Santa Clara County, California, United States

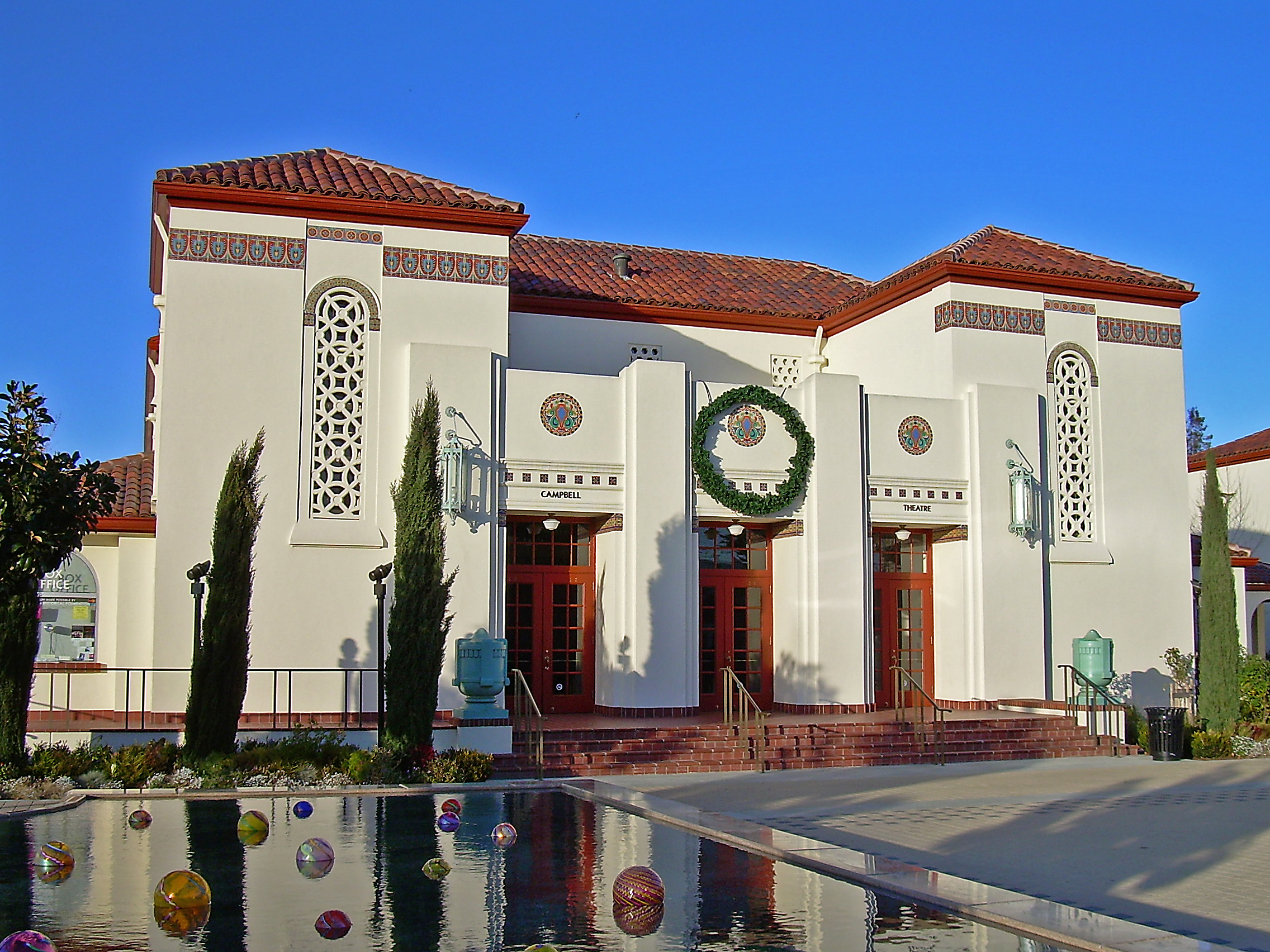
- Campbell High School in 2007

Location
- Campbell, Santa Clara County, California; United States; 37°17′16″N 121°57′03″W

Information
- Established: 1900
- Closed: 1980
- School district: Campbell Union High School District
- Mascot: Buccaneers
- Yearbook: Oriole
- Nobel laureates: Dudley R. Herschbach
- Campbell Union High School Historic District
- U.S. National Register of Historic Places
- Location within San Jose, California Location within California Location within the United States
- Location: 1 W. Campbell Ave., Campbell, California
- Area: 3.5 acres (1.4 ha)
- Architect: Weeks, William H.; Weeks, Harold H.
- Architectural style: Mission/spanish Revival
- NRHP reference No.: 89001048
- Added to NRHP: August 17, 1989

Campbell High School was the first high school to open in the Campbell Union High School District. The school was established on September 14, 1900, in Campbell, California. It is also sometimes called Campbell Union High School, and the abbreviation can be found both as CHS or CUHS.

After 80 years, the school was closed in June 1980 due to declining enrollment at the school and within the district. The campus was purchased by the city of Campbell on August 1, 1985, and is now used as a community center.

== History ==
Campbell Union High School opened its doors as part of the district in 1900, with a registration of 35 students, consisting of 23 girls and 12 boys. Two teachers were hired to educate the students: Professor E. A. Powers and Miss J. M. Newton. It was on the second floor of Campbell's Grammar School. The first graduating class was one student, Charles Beardsley, who went on to Stanford University and became a lawyer, thus proving Campbell Union High School's academic merit.

By 1904, Principal Fred Smith had gotten the school moved to a new (bigger) building on the southeast corner of Winchester and Campbell Avenues. In 1936, they built again, on the northwest corner of the same intersection, where the buildings still are today.

In 1938, the auditorium of the Campbell Union High School was built, with Work Projects Administration funds and the design of William H. Weeks. It is now commonly known as the Heritage Theater. Over the course of its forty years as part of the school, it is estimated that 20,000 students performed there.

Larry Hill, (a.k.a. Laurance J. Hill), Campbell's principal beginning in 1946, and a superintendent of the Campbell Union High School District until 1969, is credited with much of the district's growth and planning in his years in office. An award in his name is given out every year at each high school in the district.

Campbell High School, although the namesake school of the district, was closed in 1980, because of declining enrollment in the area and in the district. Prospect, Westmont and Del Mar High School's attendance boundaries subsequently expanded to pick up the slack. On August 1, 1985, after some negotiating, the city of Campbell purchased the campus, including the historic Heritage Theater, and it became the Campbell Community Center.

The Heritage Theater, formerly the high school's auditorium, was reopened as the Campbell Community Center after renovations in 2004. Many local performance groups, including high schools in the CUHSD, rent the Heritage for various noteworthy performances. The rest of the Community Center holds classes, and portions are available to be rented for various purposes, including large meeting halls, office space, and outdoor facilities.

=== National Register listing ===
The campus' three buildings, as the Campbell Union High School Historic District, were added to the National Register of Historic Places in 1989. They are the only example of 1930s Works Progress Administration construction built in the Spanish Mission style.

== Principals ==
- Professor J. Fred Smith (1900–1912)
- Irving W. Snow (1912–1920)
- D. H. Cramer (1920–1934)
- Lloyd K. Wood (1934–1938)
- Willard H. Van Dyke (1938–1944)
- James W. Dent (1944–1946)
- Laurance J. Hill (1946–1969) Principal and Superintendent
- Sam Reed (1955–1961)
- Robert Culp (1961–1969)
- Robert Peck (1969–1974)
- Roland Baldwin (1974–1980)

== Notable alumni ==
Notable alumni of Campbell High School include:

- Donald D. Chamberlin, Ph.D., computer scientist, one of the principal designers of the SQL database query language.
- Steve Davis, Major League Baseball (MLB) player for the Chicago Cubs
- Don Hahn, MLB outfielder, 1969–75
- Dudley R. Herschbach Ph.D., Nobel Prize-winning chemist
- Craig Morton, NFL quarterback, 1965–82
- Emil M. Mrak, Ph.D., Chancellor, University of California at Davis
- Larry Norman, Class of '65, pioneer of Christian rock
- Ed Oates, 1964, co-founder of Oracle Corporation
- John Oldham, MLB player and college baseball coach
- Jim K. Omura, Class of 1958, Founder of Cylink. Responsible for developing the benchmark technologies behind modern data networks. Recipient of the 2005 Alexander Graham Bell medal.
- Billy Wilson, NFL wide receiver

== See also ==
- List of closed secondary schools in California
