= John Oldham (baseball) =

American baseball player (1932–2024)

Biographical details
- Born: November 6, 1932; Salinas, California, U.S.
- Died: February 24, 2024 (aged 91); San Jose, California, U.S.

Playing career
- 1952–1954: San Jose State
- 1955, 1958: Seattle Rainiers
- (1956): Cincinnati Redlegs

Coaching career (HC unless noted)

Baseball
- 1960–1964: Campbell HS (CA)
- 1965–1966: Westmont HS (CA)
- 1967–1984: San Jose City College
- 1985–1997: Santa Clara University

Head coaching record
- Overall: 433–324–6 (Santa Clara); 390 wins (San Jose City College)

Accomplishments and honors

Championships
- 5× Coast Conference; 3× WCC (1994, 1996, 1997)

Awards
- 4× West Coast Conference Coach of the Year (1988, 1994, 1996, 1997); San Jose State Baseball Hall of Fame (Class of 1990); San Jose Sports Hall of Fame (Class of 2008); Humboldt Crabs Hall of Fame (Class of 2016)

John Hardin Oldham (November 6, 1932 – February 24, 2024) was an American Major League Baseball player. Although he was a pitcher during all of his professional career, Oldham's only MLB appearance came as a pinch runner for the Cincinnati Redlegs in the 1956 season; he is one of only two pitchers (the other being Larry Yount) who appeared in a major league game without throwing a single pitch.

== Early life ==
Oldham attended Campbell High School.

== College ==
Oldham was a three-year letterwinner at San Jose State University, from 1952 through 1954. A member of the school's Hall of Fame, Oldham still holds the Spartans' career and single-season records for strikeouts and walks; he also ranks among the school's top ten for career wins, and career and single-season innings pitched. He was the first Humboldt Crabs player to play in the Major Leagues.

== Professional ==
Oldham was signed by the Redlegs out of San Jose State in 1954 as a pitcher. He spent that season with the minor league Columbia Reds of the South Atlantic League. In 1955, he pitched for the Seattle Rainiers of the Pacific Coast League, where he had a record of 9–6 and an earned run average of 3.84. He then served for a few months in the United States Navy.

Despite not appearing in a single minor league game in 1956 (due to an injury), the Redlegs called Oldham up in September. On September 2, 1956, he entered the game against the Chicago Cubs with two out in the third inning at Crosley Field in Cincinnati as a pinch runner for Ted Kluszewski, who himself had pinch-hit for third baseman Alex Grammas. The next batter popped out and Oldham was replaced on defense by Rocky Bridges. Although he pitched for three more seasons in the minors, his MLB career was over.

Oldham batted right and threw left-handed, which was itself unusual: as of 2015, only 553 players in MLB history (about 3% of all players) hit right and threw left.

== Coaching ==
From 1970 to 1984, Oldham coached baseball at San Jose City College. From 1985 to 1997, Oldham coached the Broncos of Santa Clara University, leading them to four NCAA appearances and three West Coast Conference championships. His final record at Santa Clara was 433–324–6, a .571 winning percentage.

== Death ==
Oldham died in San Jose, California, on February 24, 2024, at the age of 91.
