= Sam Delaplane =

American baseball player (born 1995)

- Pitcher
- Born: March 27, 1995 (age 31); San Jose, California, U.S.
- Bats: Right Throws: Right

Samuel Louis Nathan Delaplane (born March 27, 1995) is an American former professional baseball pitcher. He played college baseball for Eastern Michigan University. Delaplane was drafted by the Seattle Mariners in the 23rd round of the 2017 MLB draft. Despite spending time on the 40-man rosters of the Mariners and San Francisco Giants, he never played in Major League Baseball (MLB).

== Early life ==
Delaplane is the son of Fred and Sue Delaplane, and has a brother, Brad.

He attended Leigh High School ('13) in San Jose, California, which is where he was born. Playing baseball as a pitcher and catcher, he was All-League First Team and San Jose Mercury Honorable Mention in his senior season, as he was 6–2 with a 1.66 ERA on the mound and batted .342.

== College ==
Undrafted out of high school, Delaplane attended Eastern Michigan University, earning a degree in marketing. He spent four seasons (2014–17) playing college baseball for the Eastern Michigan Eagles, and was first-team All-Mid-American Conference in his senior year. During the summer of 2016, he played for the Yarmouth–Dennis Red Sox of the Cape Cod League. He was named 2017 first team All-American (D-I) by the Jewish Sports Review. Delaplane was drafted by the Seattle Mariners in the 23rd round of the 2017 MLB draft.

== Professional career ==
=== Seattle Mariners ===
Delaplane split his debut season of 2017 between the AZL Mariners of the Rookie-level Arizona League and the Tacoma Rainiers of the Triple-A Pacific Coast League, combining to go 2–1 with a 3.00 ERA and 50 strikeouts over 33 innings (13.6 strikeouts per 9 innings). He spent the 2018 season with the Clinton LumberKings of the Single–A Midwest League, going 4–2 with 10 saves (3rd in the league) and a 1.96 ERA, and 100 strikeouts over 59 2/3 innings (15.1 strikeouts per 9 innings; he struck out 38% of batters faced).

In 2019, he split the season between the Modesto Nuts of the High–A California League and the Arkansas Travelers of the Double-A Texas League, going a combined 6–3 with 7 saves and a 2.23 ERA, and 120 strikeouts (leading all minor league relievers) over 68 2/3 innings (15.7 strikeouts per 9 innings; second-best in minor league baseball for pitchers who pitched 50 innings) in 46 relief appearances. Delaplane had the highest K-BB% (37.0%) and pure strikeout rate (45.8%) in minor league baseball, and his curveball/slider had the second-highest swing-and-miss rate of all slider in baseball. He was named a mid-season California League All Star. In September 2019 Jim Callis named him to MLB Pipeline's Second Team Prospect Team of the Year.

Following the 2019 regular season, Delaplane played for the Peoria Javelinas of the Arizona Fall League, and in six appearances was 0–1 with two saves and a 1.13 ERA over eight innings with 15 strikeouts and 1 walk. He was named a Fall League All-Star. In April 2020 Fangraphs ranked him #11 on its list of Mariners' prospects. In July 2020 CBS Sports opined: "Sam Delaplane is one of, if not the best relief prospect in the game."

Delaplane did not play in a game in 2020 due to the cancellation of the minor league season because of the COVID-19 pandemic. On November 20, 2020, Delaplane was added to the 40-man roster. That month MLB Pipeline named him Seattle's #20 Prospect. In February 2021, Fangraphs ranked him #9. On April 13, 2021, Delaplane underwent Tommy John surgery, effectively ending his 2021 season. On May 27, Delaplane was designated for assignment by Seattle.

=== San Francisco Giants ===
On May 31, 2021, Delaplane was acquired by the San Francisco Giants in exchange for cash considerations. He was placed on the 60-day injured list the next day as he continued to recover from Tommy John. Following the season, on November 30, 2021, Delaplane was non-tendered by the Giants and became a free agent. Delaplane re-signed with the Giants on December 1 on a minor league contract and was later invited to spring training. He was added to the 40-man roster in June 2022; later in the month, after four rehab outings with the San Jose Giants in which he tallied 11 strikeouts, he was put on the 60-day injured list with a right forearm strain. On November 15, Delaplane was designated for assignment by the Giants after they protected multiple prospects from the Rule 5 draft. He was non–tendered by the Giants in November 18, and became a free agent. Delaplane re–signed with the Giants on a minor league contract the following day.

Through 2022, in four minor league seasons, Delaplane was 12–6 with 17 saves and a 2.41 ERA, 1.09 WHIP, 15.3 K/9 (278 strikeouts in 164 innings), and a 4.63 SO/W ratio in 104 relief appearances.

On July 4, 2023, while playing for the High–A Eugene Emeralds, Delaplane combined with Hayden Birdsong, Mat Olsen, and William Kempner to no-hit the Tri-City Dust Devils. The no-hitter was the first since 2015, and the first since the franchise became a part of the Giants organization. He elected free agency on November 6. In 2023 Delaplane pitched for the Double–A Richmond Flying Squirrels, Eugene, and the Single–A San Jose Giants, and was 5-4 with a 4.14 ERA across 32 relief appearances. In his 45 2/3 innings, and gave up 31 hits and 36 walks while striking out 67 batters (13.2 strikeouts per 8 innings). Delaplane elected free agency following the season on November 6.

=== Long Island Ducks ===
On April 11, 2024, Delaplane signed with the Long Island Ducks of the Atlantic League of Professional Baseball. In 23 appearances for the Ducks, he compiled a 3–2 record and 4.63 ERA with 44 strikeouts across 23 1/3 innings pitched. On July 9, Delaplane retired from professional baseball.

== Coaching career ==
On January 20, 2026, Delaplane was announced as the pitching coach for the Inland Empire 66ers, the Single-A affiliate of the Seattle Mariners.
