= Steve Cisowski =

American football player (born 1963)

No. 77
- Position: Offensive tackle

Personal information
- Born: January 23, 1963 (age 63); Campbell, California, U.S.
- Listed height: 6 ft 5 in (1.96 m)
- Listed weight: 275 lb (125 kg)

Career information
- High school: Westmont (Campbell)
- College: Santa Clara (1981–1985)
- NFL draft: 1986: 8th round, 214th overall pick

Career history
- New York Giants (1986)*; Dallas Cowboys (1986–1987)
- * Offseason or practice squad member only

Awards and highlights
- All-WFC (1985)

Career NFL statistics
- Games played: 3
- Games started: 3
- Stats at Pro Football Reference

Steven James Cisowski (born January 23, 1963) is an American former professional football player who was an offensive tackle in the National Football League (NFL) for the Dallas Cowboys. He played college football for the Santa Clara Broncos.

== Early life ==
Cisowski attended Westmont High School, in Campbell, California, where he participated in football, basketball, wrestling, and track.

== College career ==
He accepted a football scholarship from NCAA Division II Santa Clara University. He was named a starter at guard as a freshman. As a senior starter at left tackle, he helped his team gain a school-record 751 yards on offense against San Francisco State University. He finished his college career after making 32 straight starts.

== Professional career ==
=== New York Giants ===
Cisowski was selected by the New York Giants in the eighth round (214th overall) of the 1986 NFL draft. He was waived on August 4.

=== Dallas Cowboys ===
On December 20, 1986, he was signed as a free agent by the Dallas Cowboys. He was released on September 7, 1987.

After the NFLPA strike was declared on the third week of the 1987 season, those contests were canceled (reducing the 16 game season to 15) and the NFL decided that the games would be played with replacement players. He was re-signed to be a part of the Dallas replacement team that was given the mock name "Rhinestone Cowboys" by the media. He started 3 games at right tackle. He was released on October 26.

In 1988, he was signed to participate in training camp. He was released on August 29.
