= Saratoga, California =

City in California, United States

- City
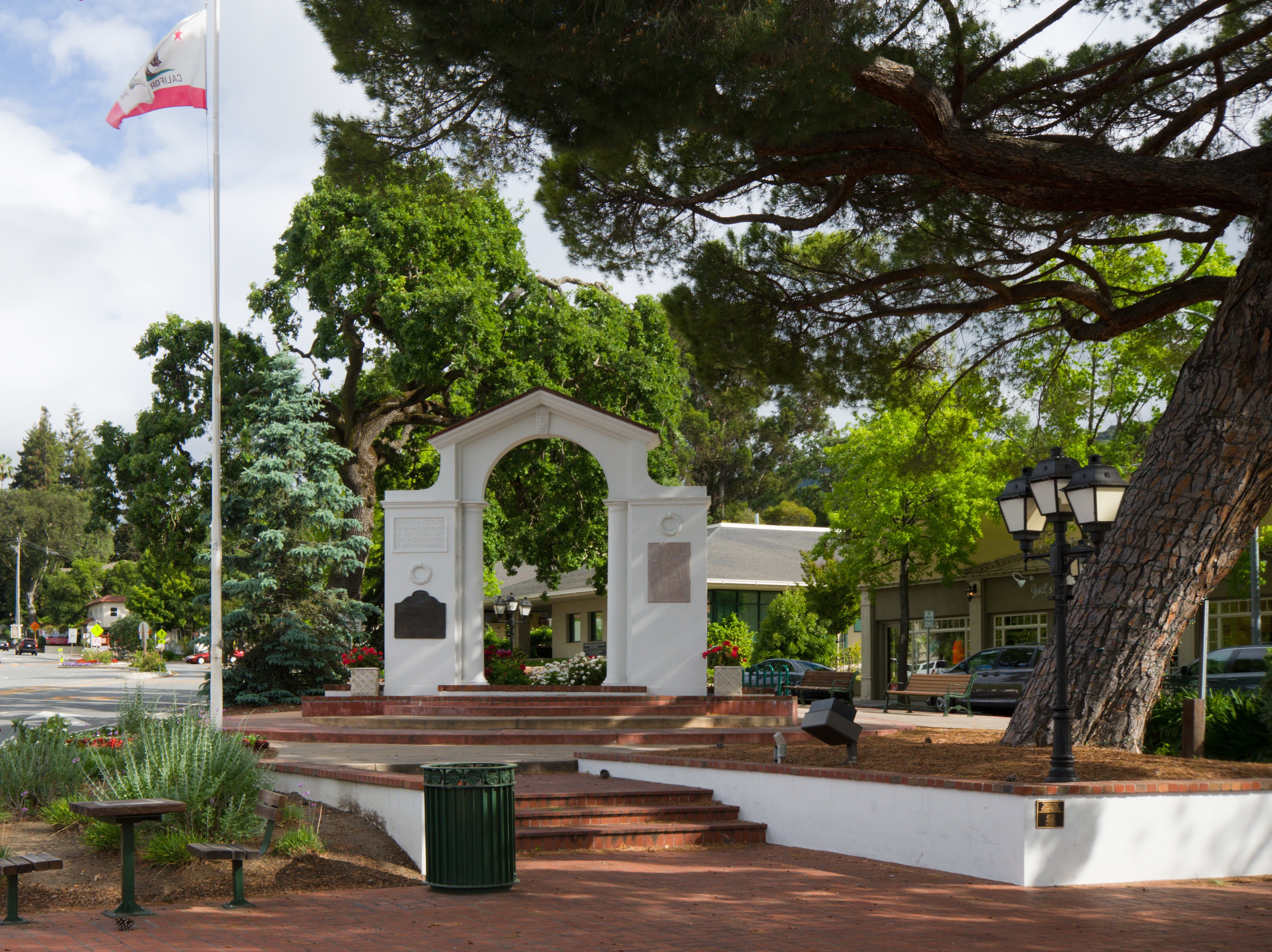
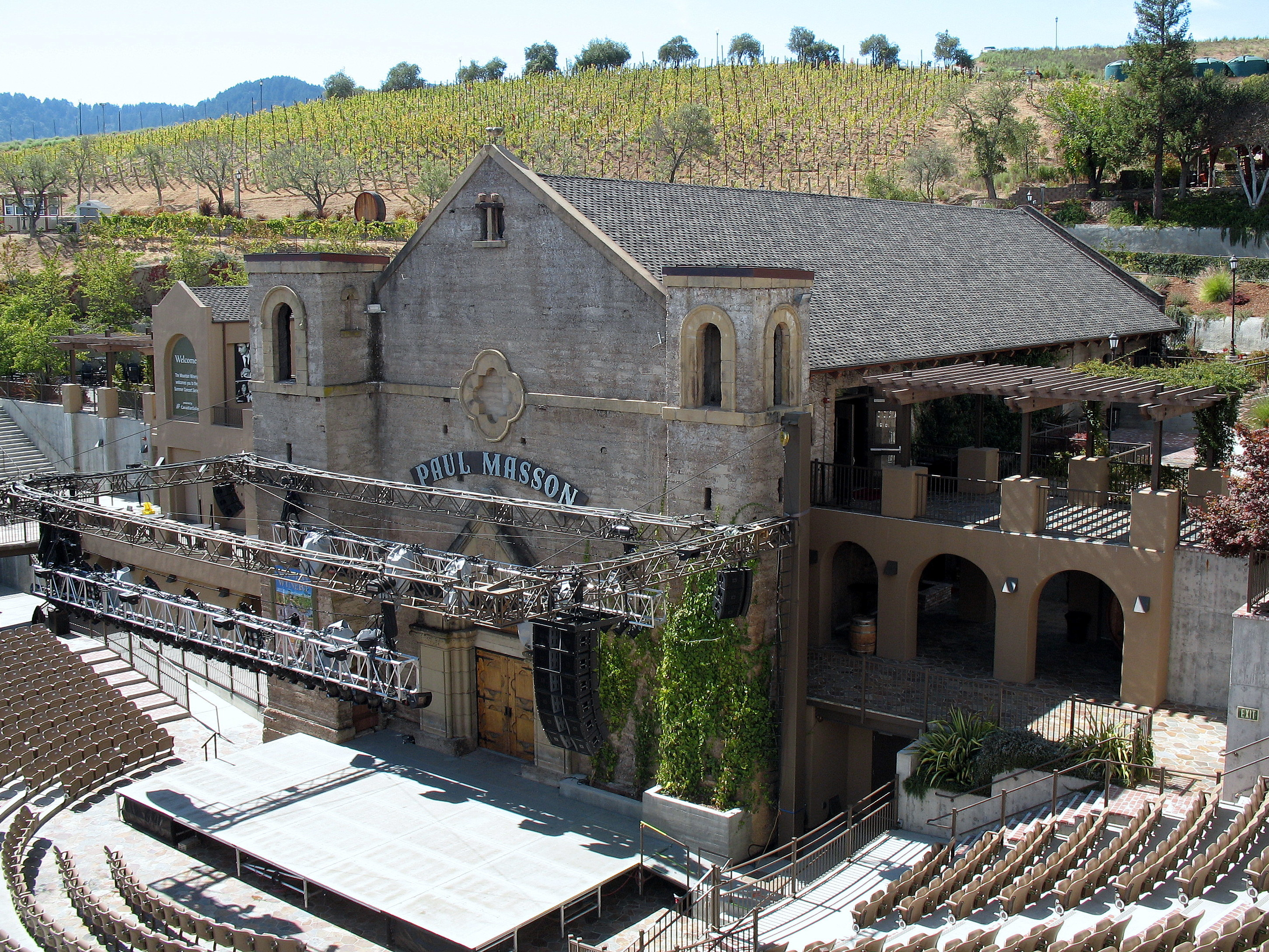
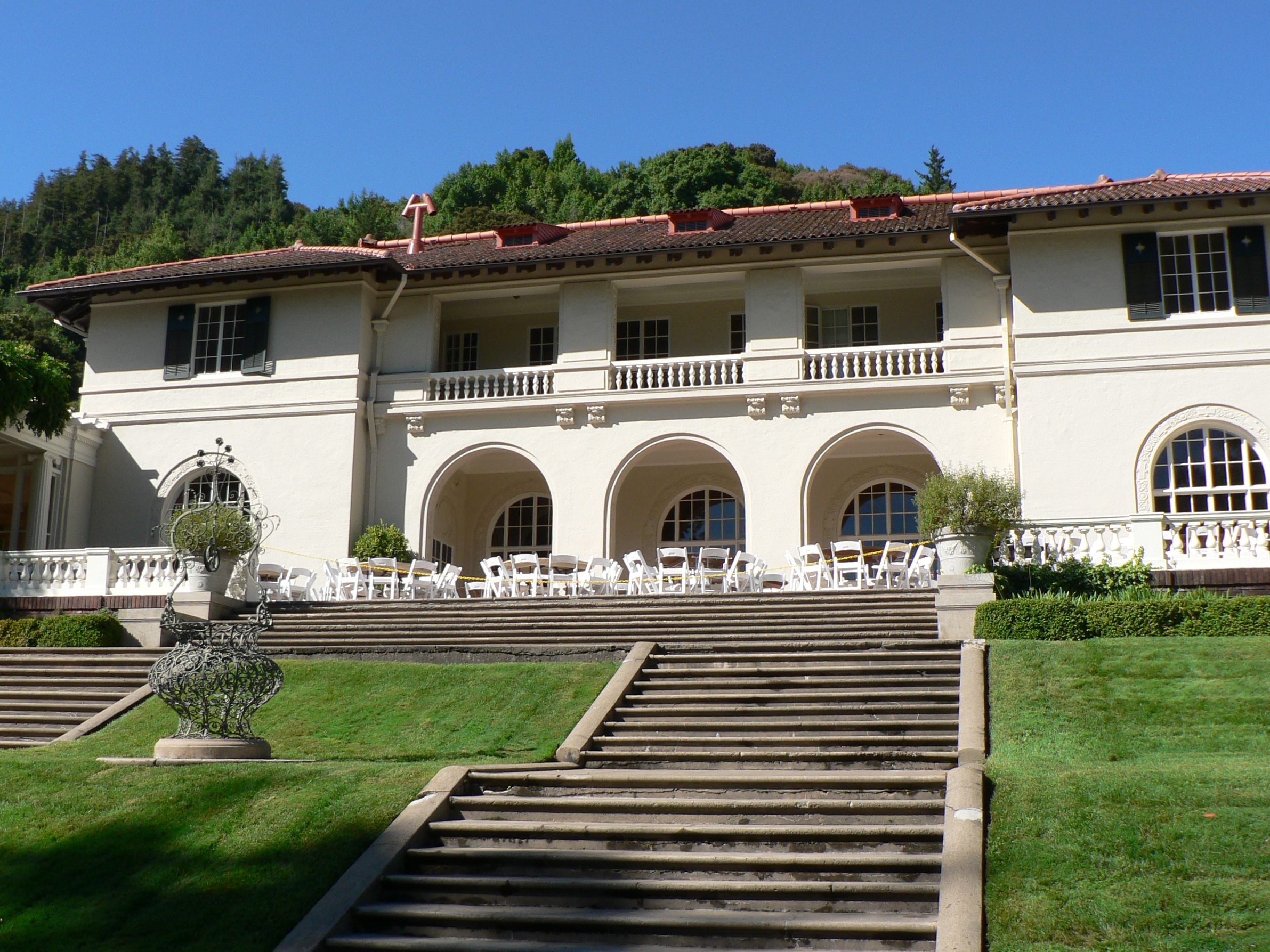
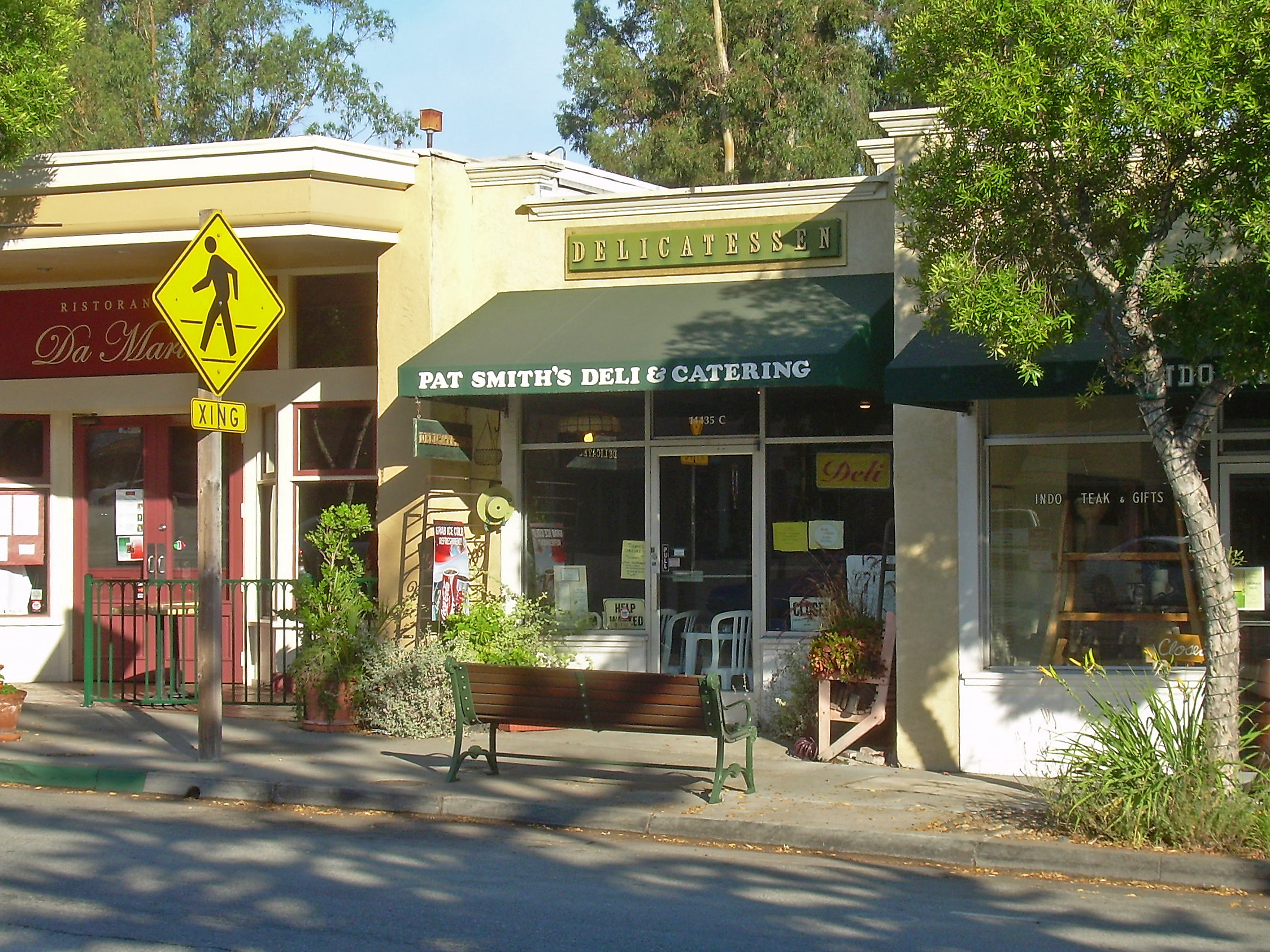
- Clockwise from top left: Memorial Arch; Mountain Winery; Downtown Saratoga; Villa Montalvo

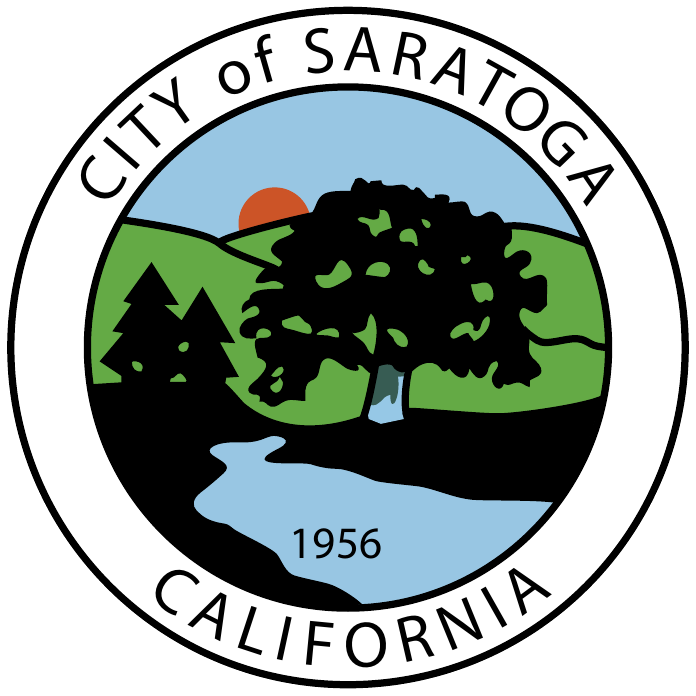
- Seal
- Interactive map of Saratoga, California
- Location in the San Francisco Bay Area Location in California Location in the United States
- Coordinates: 37°16′21″N 122°1′10″W
- Country: United States
- State: California
- County: Santa Clara
- Incorporated: October 22, 1956
- Named for: Saratoga Springs, New York

Government
  - Mayor: Chuck Page

Area
  - Total: 12.78 sq mi (33.10 km^{2})
  - Land: 12.78 sq mi (33.10 km^{2})
  - Water: 0 sq mi (0.00 km^{2}) 0%
- Elevation: 423 ft (129 m)

Population (2020)
  - Total: 31,051
  - Density: 2,430/sq mi (938.1/km^{2})
- Time zone: UTC−8 (Pacific)
  - Summer (DST): UTC−7 (PDT)
- ZIP codes: 95070–95071
- Area codes: 408/669
- FIPS code: 06-70280
- GNIS feature IDs: 1656315, 2411832
- Website: www.saratoga.ca.us

Saratoga is a city in Santa Clara County, California, United States. Located in Silicon Valley, in the southern Bay Area, it had a population of 31,051 at the 2020 census. The U.S. Census Bureau estimated Saratoga's population at 30,418 as of July 1, 2025.. Saratoga is known for its wineries, restaurants, and historic landmarks like Villa Montalvo, Mountain Winery, and Hakone Gardens.

== History ==
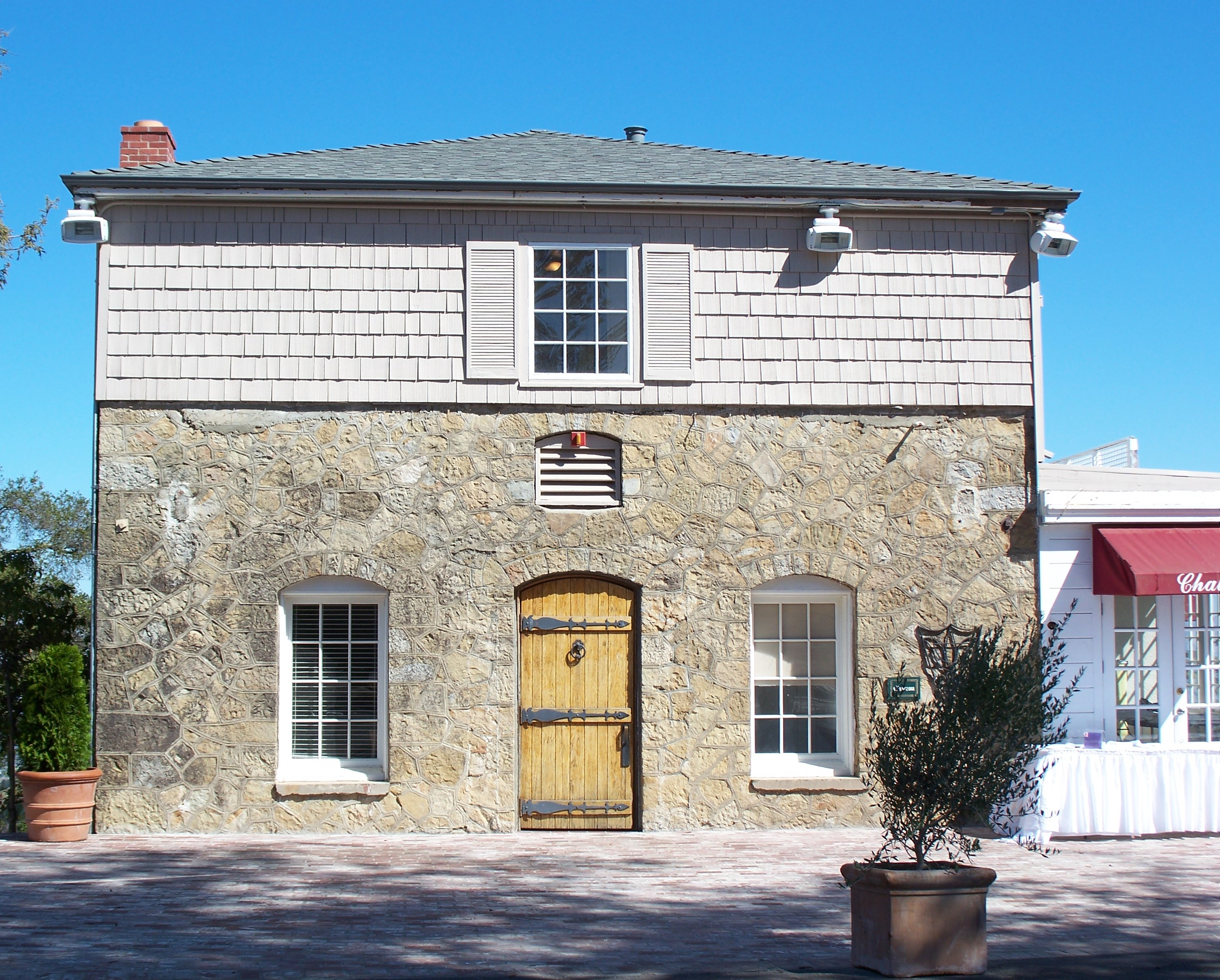
Mountain Winery, founded by noted viticulturist Paul Masson in 1901.

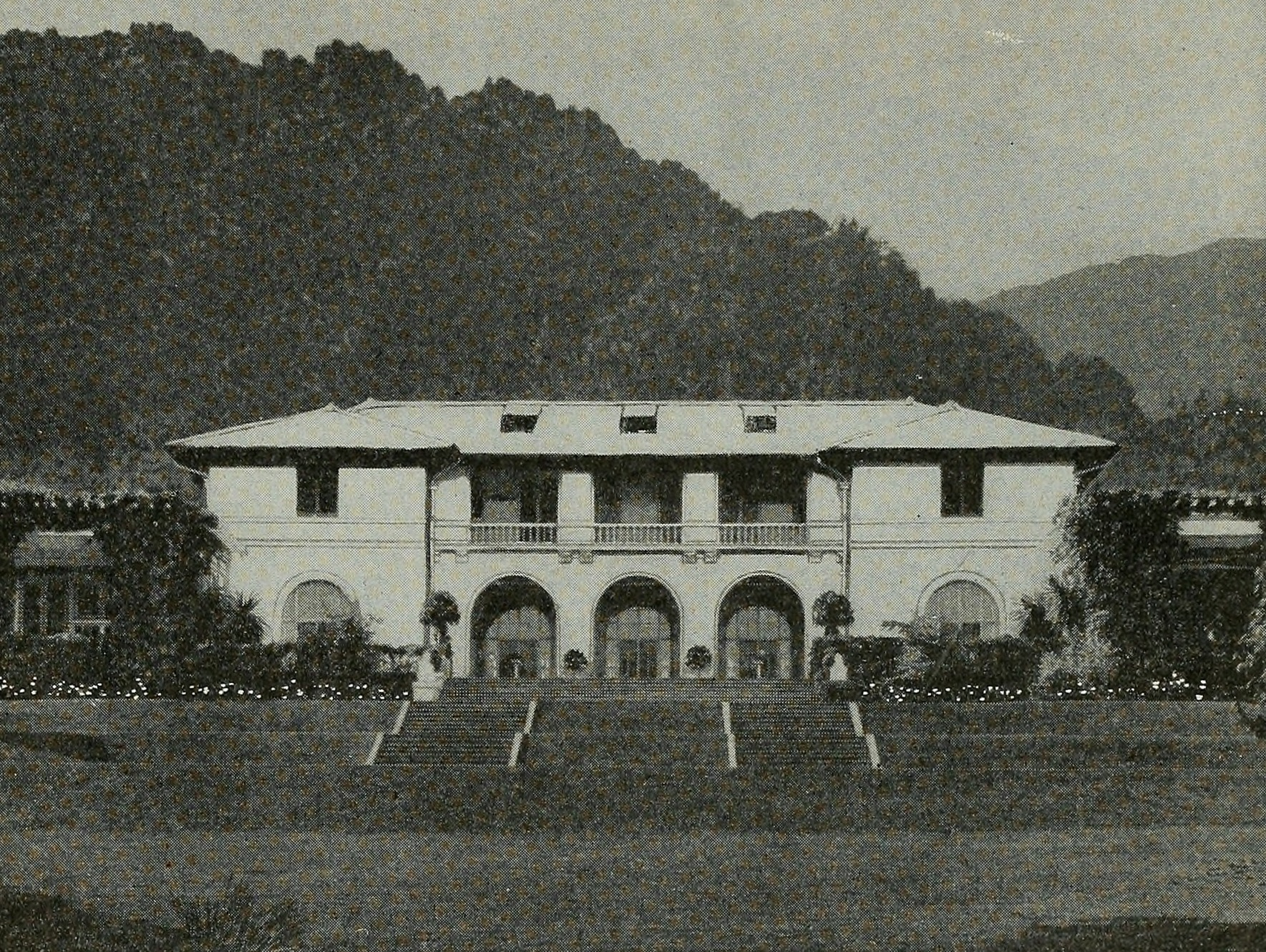
Villa Montalvo (now Montalvo Art Center), the historic estate of James D. Phelan, is named after Garci Rodríguez de Montalvo, who named California.

The area comprising Saratoga was earlier inhabited by the Ohlone Native Americans. In 1847, European settlers created a settlement at what is now Saratoga when William Campbell (father of Benjamin Campbell, the founder of nearby Campbell, California), constructed a sawmill about 2.5 miles (4.0 km) southeast of the present downtown area. An early map noted the area as Campbell's Gap.

In 1851, Martin McCarthy, who had leased the mill, built a toll road down to the Santa Clara Valley and founded what is now Saratoga as McCarthysville. The toll gate was located at the present-day intersection of Big Basin Way and 3rd St., giving the town its first widely used name: Toll Gate. During the Civil War, a woman wanted to show her support for the South by wearing a Confederate flag with the motto "Shall we not protect our cotton?” to a local ball. This caused quite a stir in the area. In 1867 the town received a post office under the name of McCarthysville.

Early residents, who moved to Saratoga in 1881, were Mary Brown (1816–1884), widow of the abolitionist John Brown; her daughters Sarah and Ellen; and the husband of the latter, James Fablinger. All of them are buried in the Madronia Cemetery.

The town soon industrialized with the building of a furniture factory, grist mill, tannery, and paper factory. To commemorate this newfound productivity, the town was renamed again in 1863 as Bank Mills. In the 1850s, Jud Caldwell discovered springs which were called Pacific Congress Springs because the water had a mineral content similar to Congress Springs in Saratoga Springs, New York. In 1865 the town received its final name, Saratoga, after the city in New York. At the same time a resort hotel called Congress Hall was constructed at the springs, named after the famous resort Congress Hall at Saratoga Springs, New York. California's Congress Hall attracted tourists to the area until it burned down in 1903. These events would eventually lead to Saratoga being listed as a California Historical Landmark in 1950.

Saratoga became agricultural like much of the rest of the valley; a few vineyards and orchards from this period remain today. The Miller-Melone Ranch is the last remaining prune ranch home in Saratoga and was listed on the National Register of Historic Places on April 1, 1993. After World War II, the town quickly became urbanized, and it incorporated in 1956 mostly to avoid being annexed by San Jose. A slogan during the campaign to incorporate the city of Saratoga was "Keep it rural," according to historian Willys I. Peck. Today the city serves as a bedroom community for upper class Silicon Valley tech workers and executives.

Saratoga drew notoriety for the suicide of Audrie Pott, a 15-year-old Saratoga High School student, September 2012. The three teenagers who were charged with sexually assaulting Pott pleaded guilty and served one month in juvenile hall for the sexual assault, also for which the high school offered no repercussions. Saratoga High School is also depicted in Steven Spielberg's 2022 film The Fabelmans.

== Geography ==
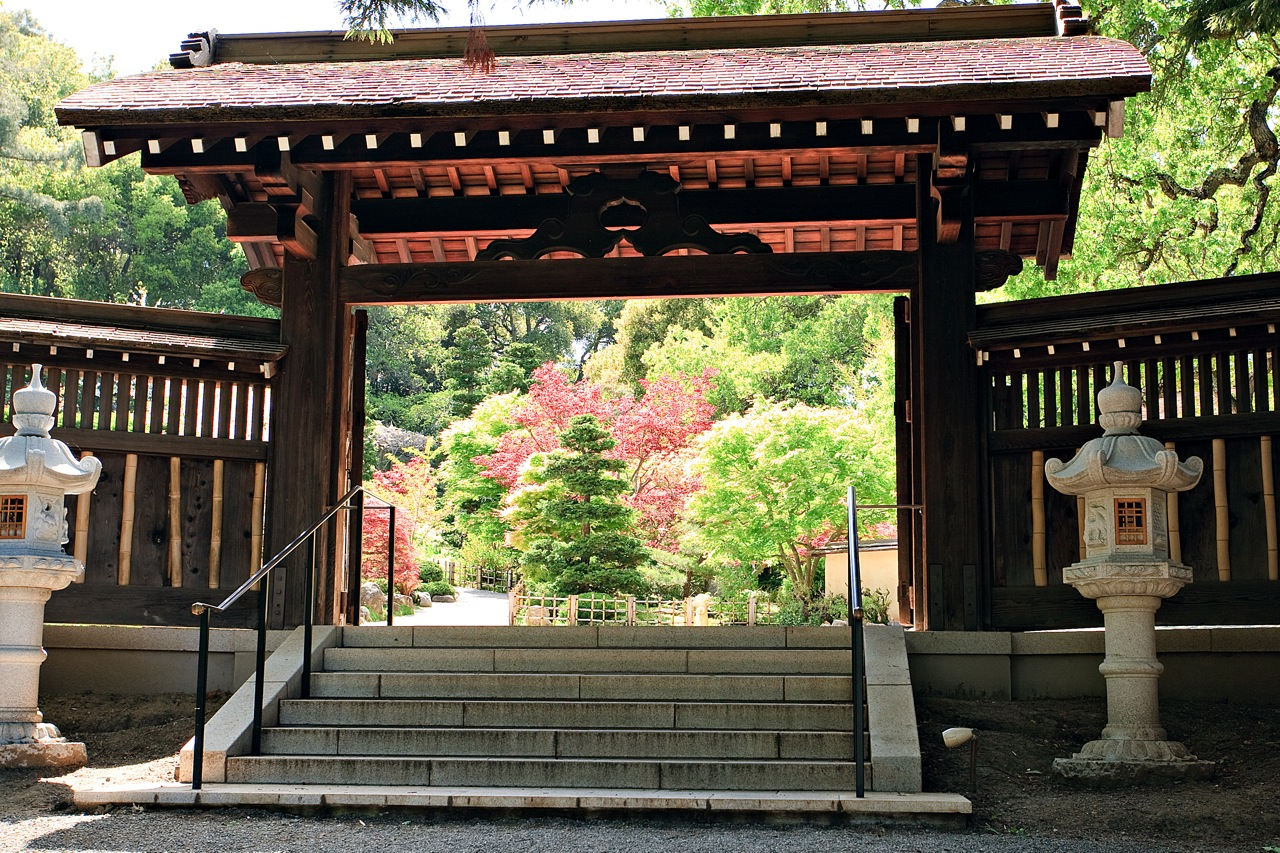
Hakone Gardens, founded in 1917. The west coast premiere of the opera Madama Butterfly by Puccini was held in the gardens in 1923.

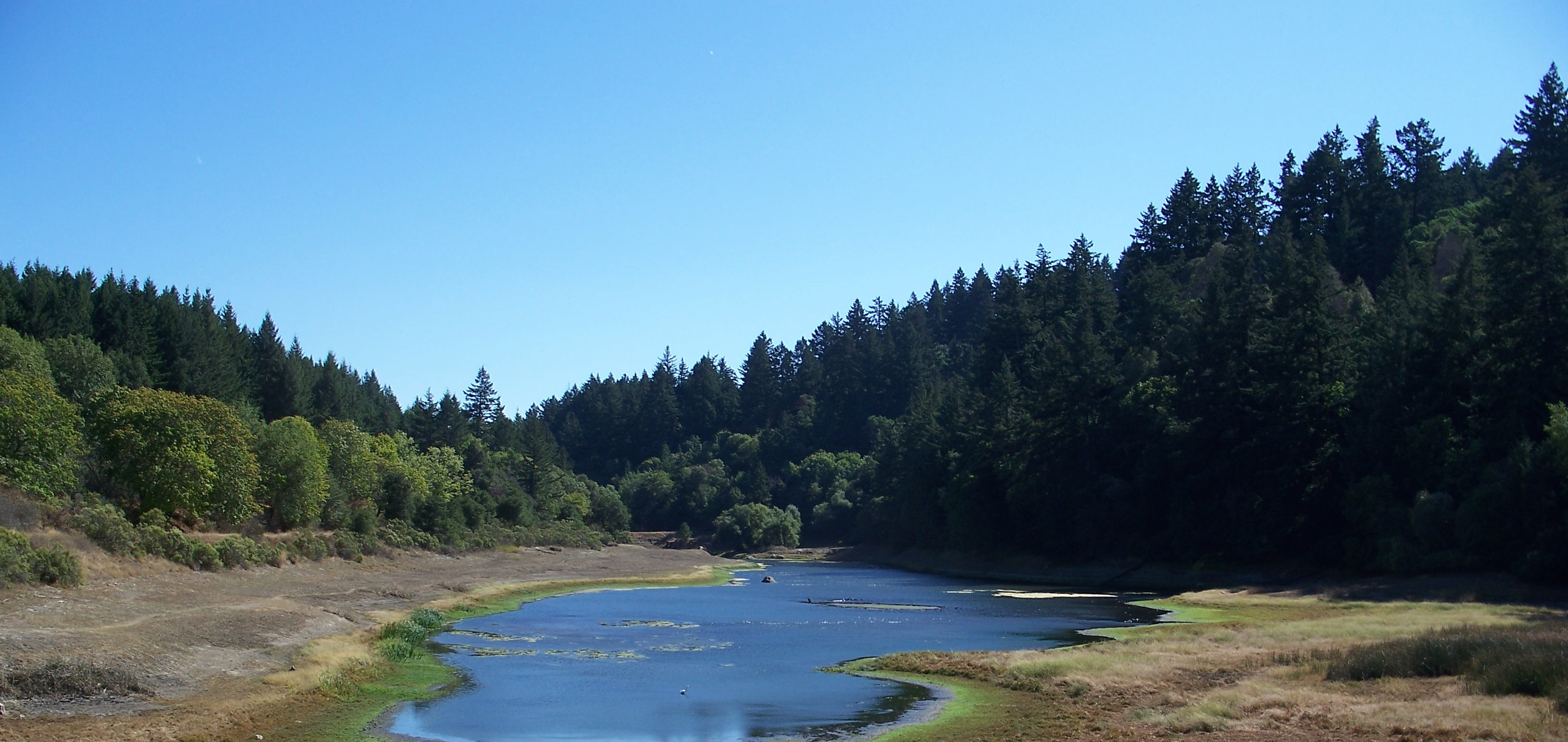
Sanborn County Park

Saratoga is bordered by Cupertino and San Jose to the north, a small portion of Campbell and Los Gatos to the east, and Monte Sereno to the southeast. Saratoga is located at 37°16′21″N 122°01′10″W. According to the United States Census Bureau, the city has a total area of 12.8 square miles (33 km^{2}), all land. Within its borders, Saratoga includes lush redwood forests, foothills suitable for wine grapes and sunny valley floor once covered with prune and apricot orchards, now with suburban homes, schools and churches.

Neighborhoods in Saratoga include Brookview and Pride's Crossing in the northern part of the city, Blue Hills and Greenbrier in the northwestern area, and Congress Springs in the southwestern corner of Saratoga. The Golden Triangle, a name invented by real estate agents, is an area bounded by Saratoga Avenue, Saratoga-Sunnyvale Road and Cox Avenue. The Golden Triangle consists mostly of four-bedroom ranch homes (with values ranging from between $1 and $3 million) on quarter acre lots that are gradually being replaced by Mediterranean custom designs. Northeast of the Golden Triangle is a neighborhood known as Saratoga Woods, a small community located behind Prospect High School north of Cox. Bellgrove Circle is a popular neighborhood located next to Route 85. The land of Bellgrove Circle, once used as a vineyard, was previously owned by Paul Masson Winery and is east of Saratoga Avenue and north of Routet 85. Kentfield is south of Route 85 and east of Saratoga Avenue. Parker Ranch is a very affluent neighborhood with 1-acre (4,000 m^{2}) minimum lots, west of Saratoga-Sunnyvale Road and up into the hills. The downtown area along Big Basin Way is known as the Village.

== Demographics ==
Historical population
Census	Pop.	Note	%±
1880	297		—
1960	14,861		—
1970	26,810		80.4%
1980	29,261		9.1%
1990	28,061		−4.1%
2000	29,843		6.4%
2010	29,926		0.3%
2020	31,051		3.8%
U.S. Decennial Census

=== Racial and ethnic composition ===
Saratoga, California – Racial and ethnic composition Note: the US Census treats Hispanic/Latino as an ethnic category. This table excludes Latinos from the racial categories and assigns them to a separate category. Hispanics/Latinos may be of any race.
Race / Ethnicity (NH = Non-Hispanic)	Pop 2000	Pop 2010	Pop 2020	% 2000	% 2010	% 2020
White alone (NH)	19,434	15,431	11,538	65.12%	51.56%	37.16%
Black or African American alone (NH)	110	91	98	0.37%	0.30%	0.32%
Native American or Alaska Native alone (NH)	34	24	24	0.11%	0.08%	0.08%
Asian alone (NH)	8,664	12,331	16,829	29.03%	41.20%	54.20%
Native Hawaiian or Pacific Islander alone (NH)	2	23	38	0.07%	0.08%	0.12%
Other race alone (NH)	37	56	147	0.12%	0.19%	0.47%
Mixed race or Multiracial (NH)	606	936	1,252	2.03%	3.13%	4.03%
Hispanic or Latino (any race)	936	1,034	1,125	3.14%	3.46%	3.62%
Total	29,843	29,926	31,051	100.00%	100.00%	100.00%

=== 2020 census ===
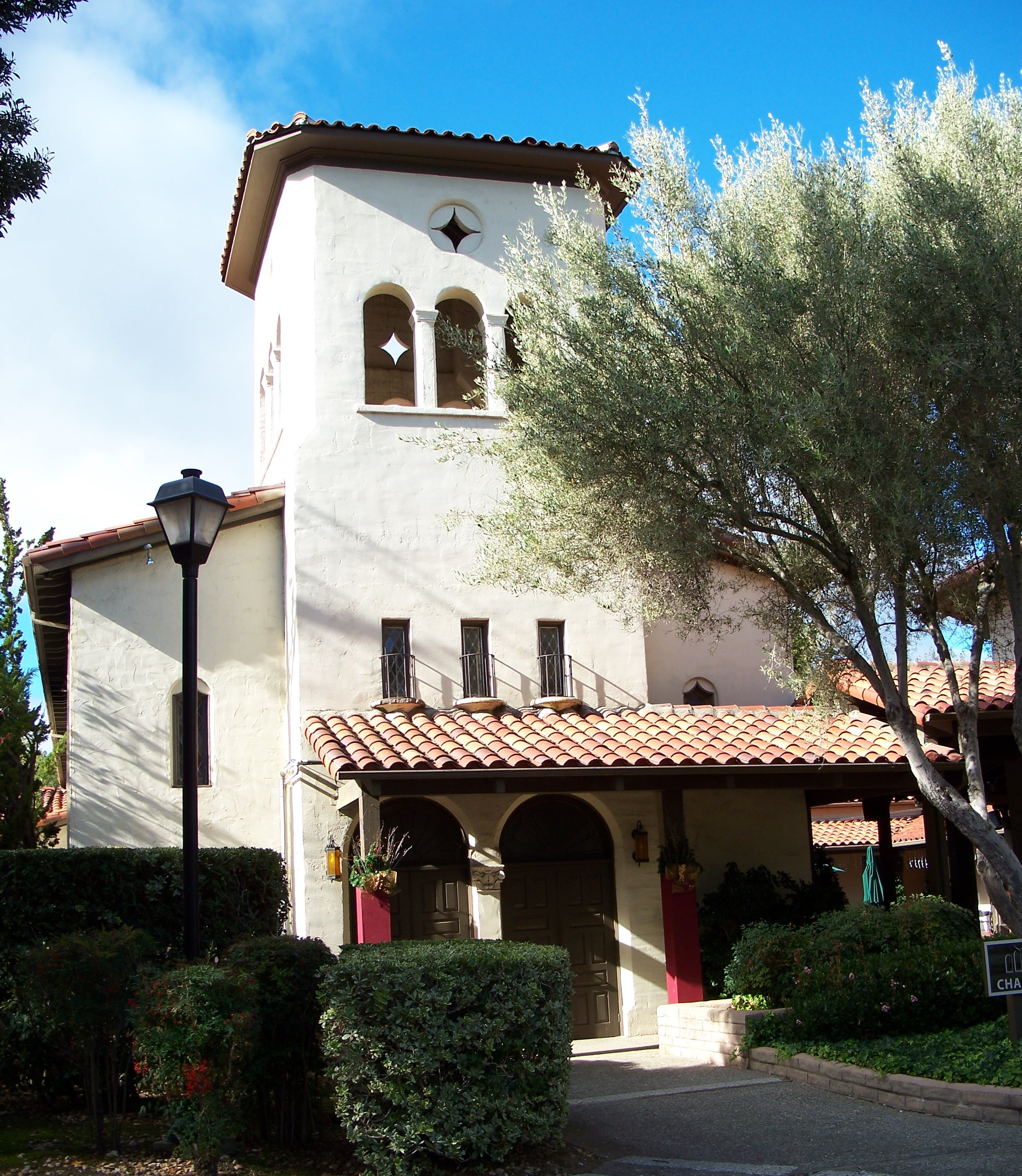
The Federated Church of Saratoga

As of the 2020 census, Saratoga had a population of 31,051 and a population density of 2,429.7 inhabitants per square mile (938.1/km^{2}). 99.0% of residents lived in urban areas, while 1.0% lived in rural areas.

The census reported that 99.5% of the population lived in households, 0.0% lived in non-institutionalized group quarters, and 0.5% were institutionalized. There were 10,830 households, out of which 34.6% included children under the age of 18, 73.7% were married-couple households, 2.1% were cohabiting couple households, 15.6% had a female householder with no spouse or partner present, and 8.6% had a male householder with no spouse or partner present. 14.4% of households were one person, and 10.5% were one person aged 65 or older. The average household size was 2.85. There were 8,981 families (82.9% of all households).

The age distribution was 19.9% under the age of 18, 7.6% aged 18 to 24, 14.8% aged 25 to 44, 34.0% aged 45 to 64, and 23.7% who were 65 years of age or older. The median age was 49.9 years. For every 100 females, there were 96.9 males, and for every 100 females age 18 and over there were 94.7 males age 18 and over.

There were 11,264 housing units at an average density of 881.4 units per square mile (340.3 units/km^{2}). Of these, 10,830 (96.1%) were occupied and 3.9% were vacant. Of occupied units, 85.3% were owner-occupied and 14.7% were occupied by renters. The homeowner vacancy rate was 0.4%; the rental vacancy rate was 5.0%.

=== 2023 estimate ===
In 2023, the US Census Bureau estimated that the median household income was $241,348, and the per capita income was $123,743. About 2.7% of families and 3.7% of the population were below the poverty line.

=== 2010 census ===
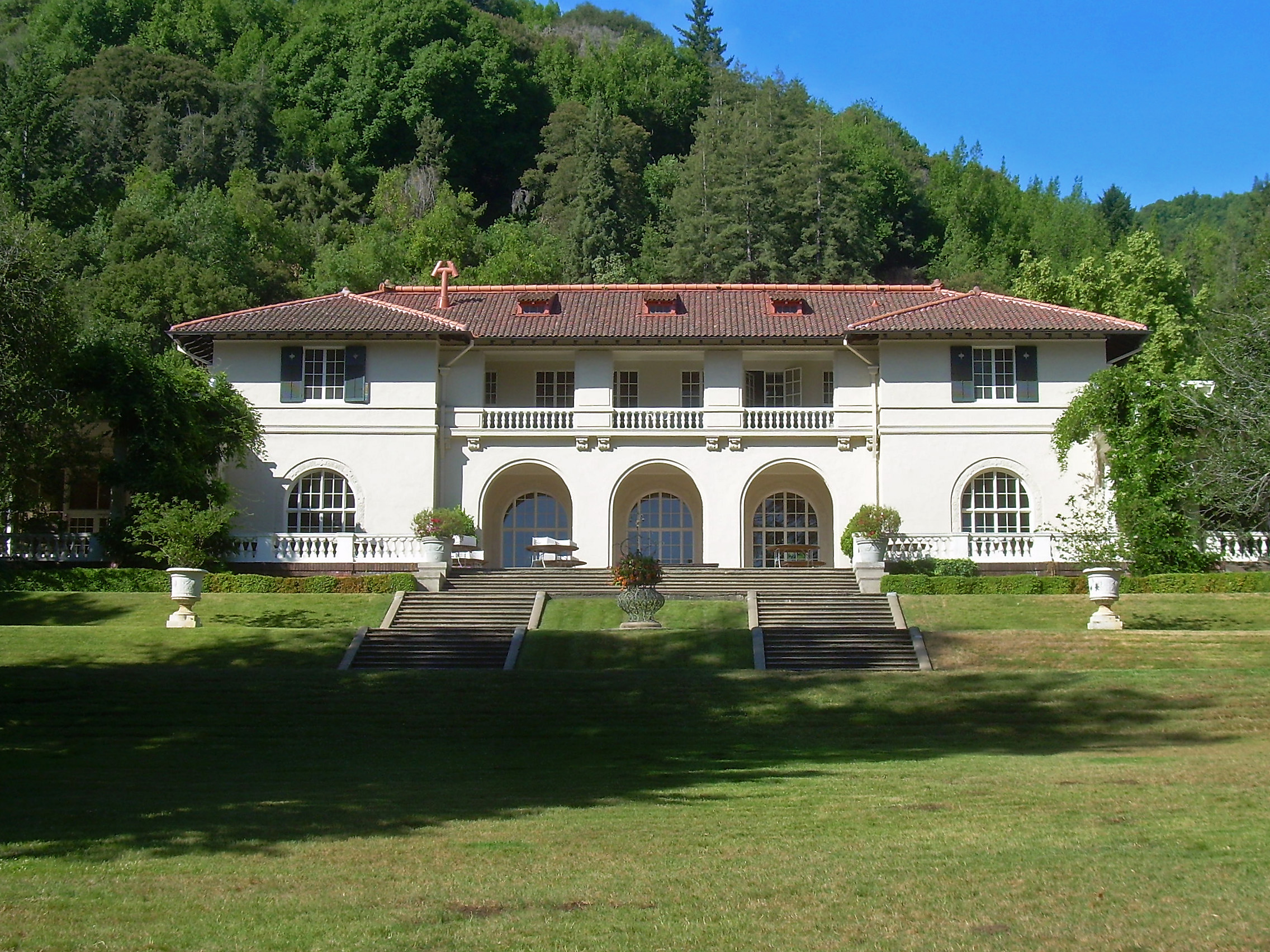
Montalvo Arts Center

The 2010 United States census reported that Saratoga had a population of 29,926. The population density was 2,416.9 inhabitants per square mile (933.2/km^{2}). The racial makeup of Saratoga was 16,125 (53.9%) White, 94 (0.3%) African American, 41 (0.1%) Native American, 12,376 (41.4%) Asian, 23 (0.1%) Pacific Islander, 202 (0.7%) from other races, and 1,065 (3.6%) from two or more races. There were 1,034 Hispanic or Latino residents of any race (3.5%).

The census reported that 29,727 people (99.3% of the population) lived in households, 34 (0.1%) lived in non-institutionalized group quarters, and 165 (0.6%) were institutionalized.

There were 10,734 households, out of which 4,024 (37.5%) had children under the age of 18 living in them, 7,893 (73.5%) were opposite-sex married couples living together, 608 (5.7%) had a female householder with no husband present, 213 (2.0%) had a male householder with no wife present. There were 159 (1.5%) unmarried opposite-sex partnerships, and 44 (0.4%) same-sex married couples or partnerships. 1,740 households (16.2%) were made up of individuals, and 1,115 (10.4%) had someone living alone who was 65 years of age or older. The average household size was 2.77. There were 8,714 families (81.2% of all households); the average family size was 3.11.

In Saratoga, 7,173 people (24.0%) were under the age of 18, 1,390 people (4.6%) were aged 18 to 24, 4,678 people (15.6%) were aged 25 to 44, 10,598 people (35.4%) aged 45 to 64, and 6,087 people (20.3%) who were 65 years of age or older. The median age was 47.8 years. For every 100 females, there were 95.7 males. For every 100 females age 18 and over, there were 92.6 males.

There were 11,123 housing units at an average density of 898.3 units per square mile (346.8 units/km^{2}), of which 9,258 (86.2%) were owner-occupied, and 1,476 (13.8%) were occupied by renters. The homeowner vacancy rate was 0.7%; the rental vacancy rate was 4.3%. 26,201 people (87.6% of the population) lived in owner-occupied housing units and 3,526 people (11.8%) lived in rental housing units.

In 2011, Bloomberg Businessweek reported that the average household income was $237,804 with an average household net worth of $1,516,018.

== Economy ==
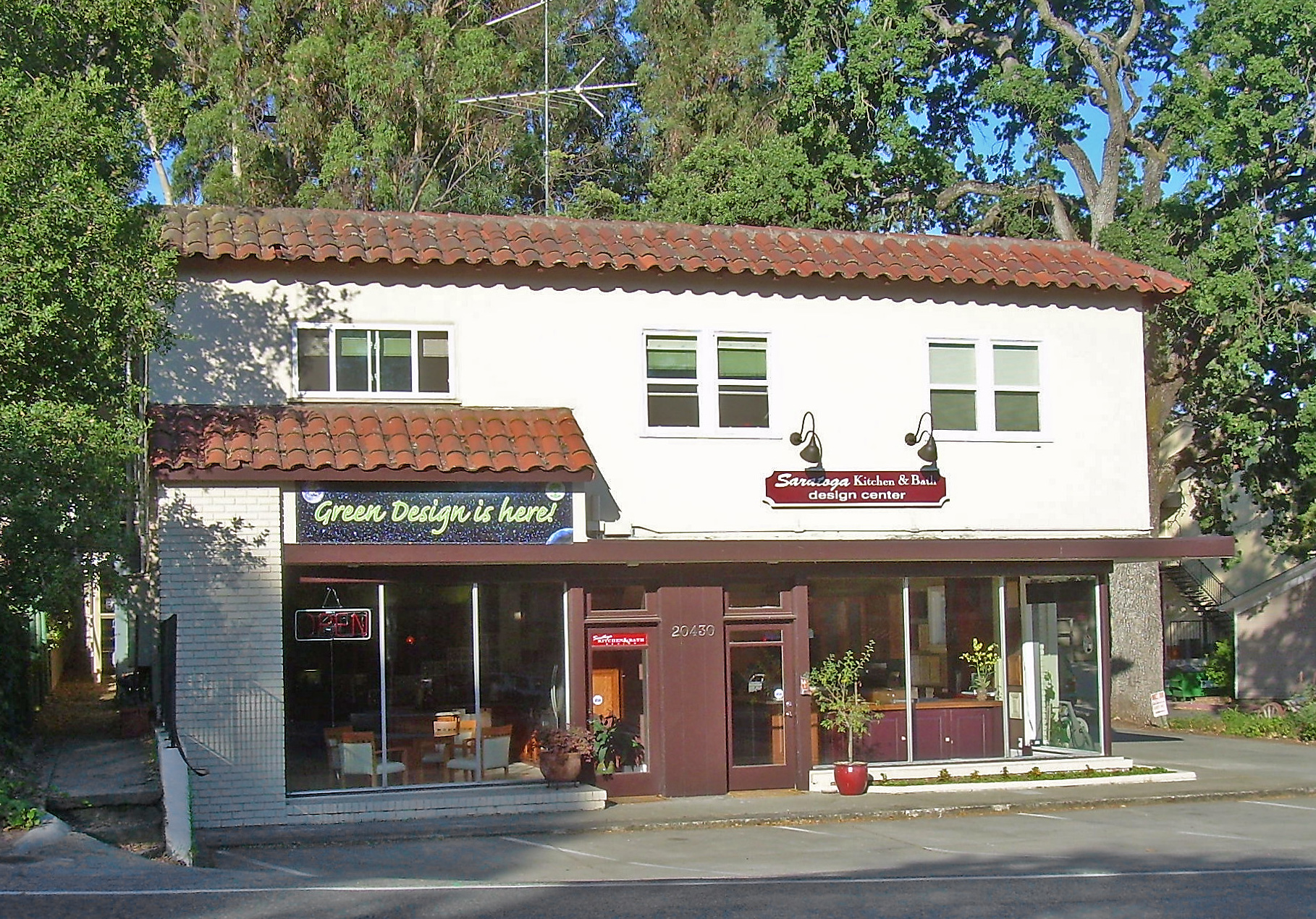
Shop in Saratoga Village

The 2016 Coldwell Banker Home Listing Report listed Saratoga as the most expensive housing market in the United States. In 2010, Bloomberg Businessweek named Saratoga the most expensive suburb in California. According to CNN Money, 70.42% of Saratoga households have an income greater than $100,000.

Saratoga was ranked by Forbes in 2009 as one of America's top 20 most-educated small towns. Bloomberg Businessweek named Saratoga's zip code 95070 the 18th richest zip code in America in 2011. In 2018, data from the American Community Survey revealed that Saratoga was the 8th wealthiest city in the United States.

== Government ==
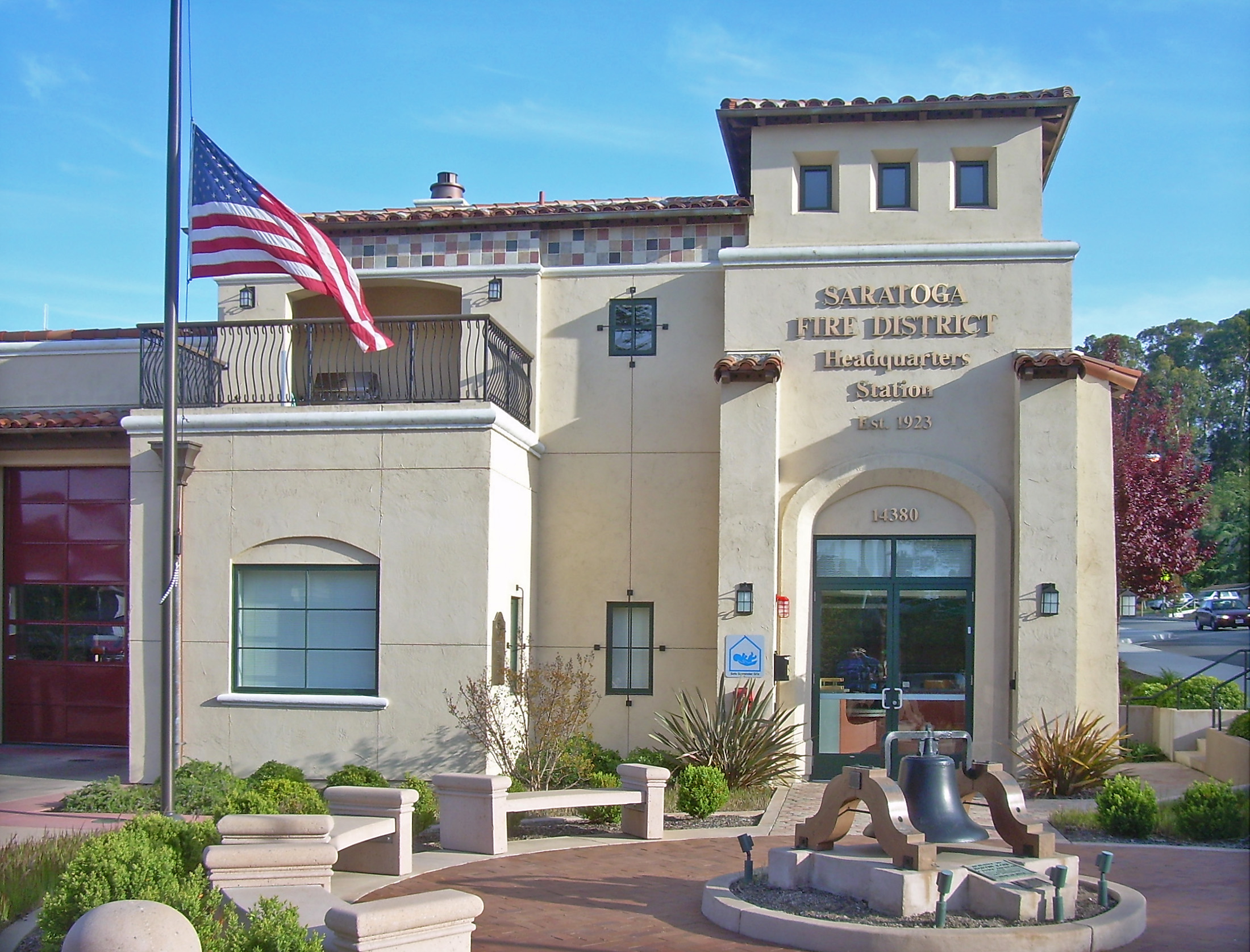
Saratoga Fire Station

Saratoga is a general law city under California law, meaning that the organization and powers of the city are established by state law. It has a council–manager form of government. The current mayor is Chuck Page, and the Vice Mayor is Tina Walia. The other current council members are Kookie Fitzsimmons, Belal Aftab, and Yan Zhao.

The Saratoga City Council has had to make many controversial decisions in a community with residents known to be protectionist of their existing exclusivity. The council was a leader in dealing with the unfunded pension crisis in California.

In the California State Legislature, Saratoga is in the 13th senatorial district, represented by Democrat Josh Becker, and in the 23rd Assembly district, represented by Democrat Marc Berman. In the United States House of Representatives, Saratoga is in California's 16th congressional district, represented by Democrat Sam Liccardo.

Saratoga vote by party in presidential elections
Year	Democratic	Republican
2024	68.6% 12,193	27.4% 4,866
2020	72.0% 14,396	25.9% 5,174
2016	68.6% 11,480	25.6% 4,286
2012	59.0% 9,614	39.0% 6,346
2008	61.8% 10,578	36.6% 6,268
2004	55.2% 8,886	43.8% 7,054
2000	46.8% 7,151	49.5% 7,568
1996	41.6% 6,280	49.1% 7,413
1992	35.8% 6,199	40.7% 7,049
1988	34.1% 5,709	64.5% 10,799
1984	28.3% 4,730	70.6% 11,817
1980	20.8% 3,263	64.0% 10,061
1976	29.2% 4,174	69.0% 9,867
1972	29.2% 3,967	68.2% 9,265
1968	33.9% 3,467	62.9% 6,552
1964	47.7% 4,062	52.3% 4,449

== Education ==
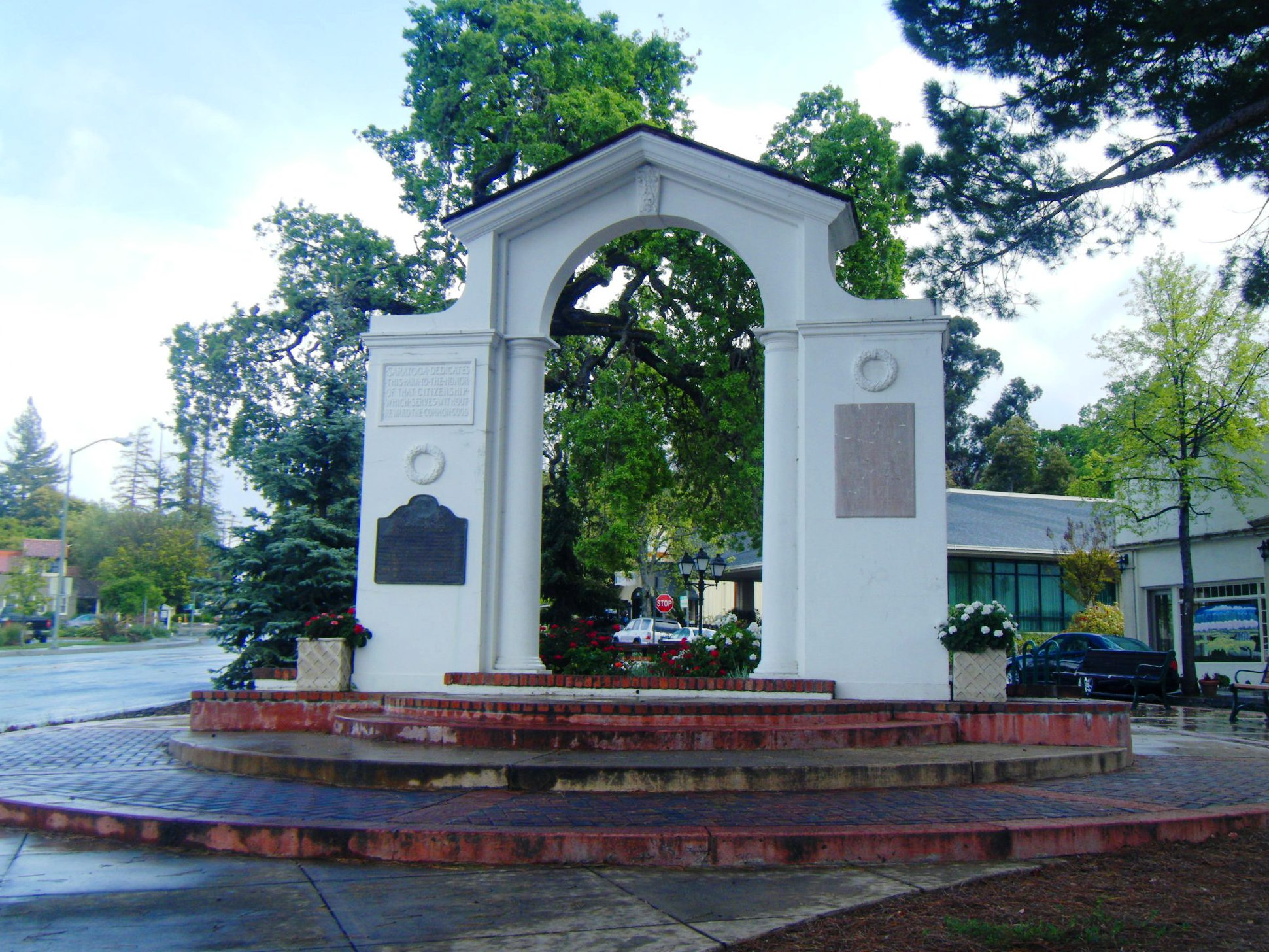
Saratoga Memorial Arch

Various public school districts serve Saratoga. At elementary level (grades K to 8) these include Saratoga Union School District, Campbell Union School District, Cupertino Union School District and Moreland School District. High school districts that serve Saratoga include the Los Gatos-Saratoga Joint Union High School District, Fremont Union High School District and Campbell Union High School District. These districts provide a number of high schools including Saratoga High School, Monta Vista High School (located in Cupertino but servicing a portion of Saratoga), Lynbrook High School (located in San Jose but servicing a portion of Saratoga as well), Prospect High School and Westmont High School (located in Campbell but servicing a portion of Saratoga).

Private schools in the area include Challenger School, Saint Andrew's School, and Sacred Heart School.

West Valley Community College provides college-level education in the district whilst the Santa Clara County Library District operates the Saratoga Library.

== Transportation ==
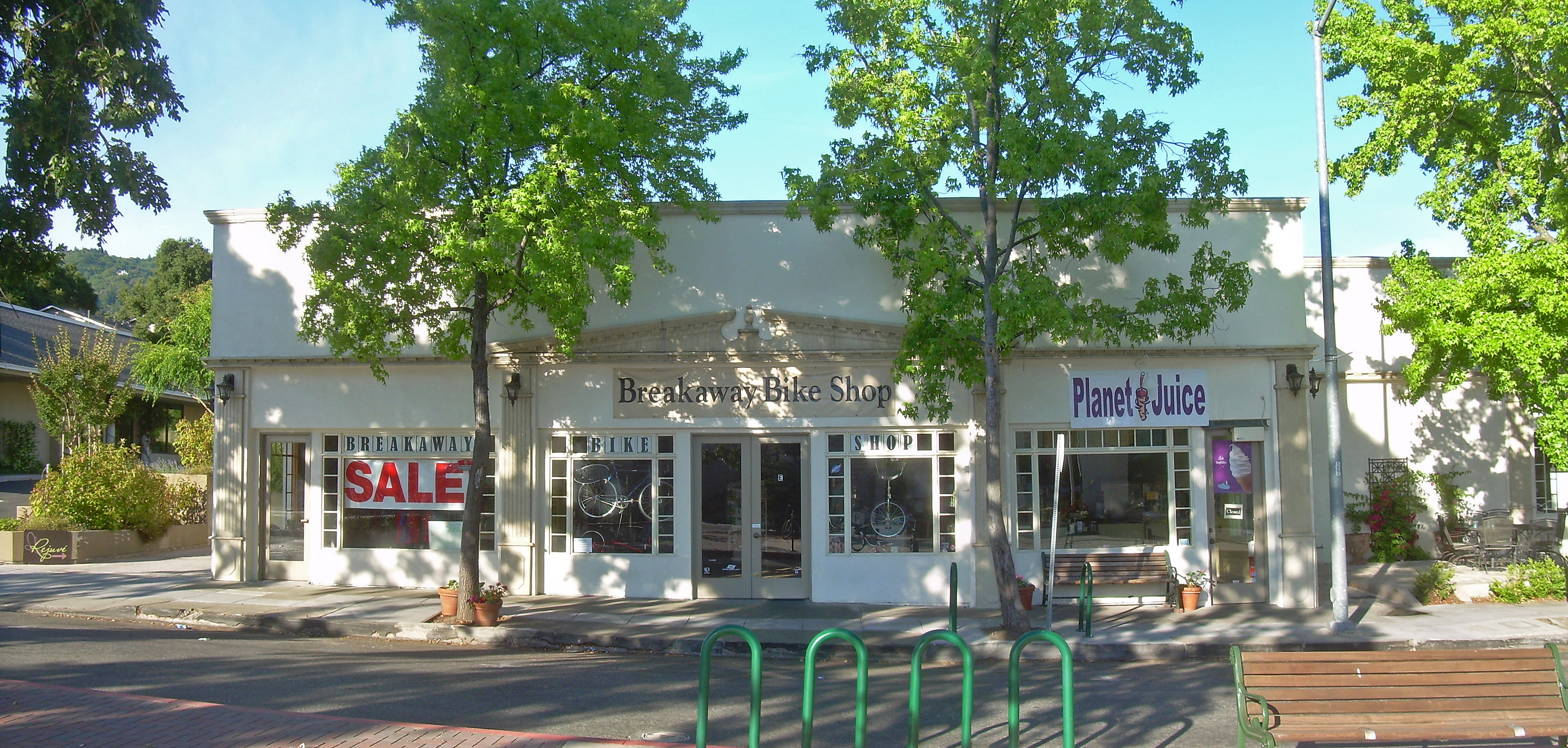
Bike shop in Saratoga Village

The original alignment of Route 85 along Saratoga-Sunnyvale Road was deleted in 1994, when the West Valley Freeway was completed, and it passes through northeast Saratoga. Highway 85 has one onramp/offramp within the city, at Saratoga Avenue. The original plans for the freeway also included exits at Quito Road and Prospect Avenue, but objections by residents kept those interchanges from being constructed. Street signs are brown in color.

The Union Pacific Railroad operates freight through the town, serves the nearby Permanente Quarry, and travels parallel to Route 85. Passenger trains, including the Peninsular Railway, operated starting in 1908 and delivered commuters to San Francisco in 90 minutes. Saratoga has no passenger train service and minimal bus service.

Saratoga also has a zoning code aimed at preserving a semi-rural appearance. Saratoga emphasizes its semi-rural appearance by foregoing street lights and sidewalks on most residential streets. This contributes to Saratoga's high housing costs.

== Sister City ==
Since 1983, Muko, Kyoto has been Saratoga's sister city.

== Notable people ==
- Jeremy Atherton Lin (born 1974), author
- Alex Brightman (born 1987), actor (Beetlejuice, School of Rock)
- Mary Brown (1816–1884), widow of John Brown the abolitionist, her daughters Sarah and Ellen, and the husband of the latter, James Fablinger. All are buried in Madronia Cemetery.
- Michael Burry (born 1971), physician and hedge fund manager
- Stephanie Elam (born 1974), news anchor (CNN, NBC)
- Joan Fontaine (1917–2013), Oscar-winning actress
- Devon Graye (born 1987), actor (Merry Christmas, Drake & Josh)
- Zaza Harvey (1879–1954), professional baseball player
- Steve Harwell (1967–2023), lead singer of the band Smash Mouth
- Olivia de Havilland (1916–2020), Oscar-winning actress
- Andrew Hong (born 2004), American chess grandmaster
- Dan Janjigian (born 1972), actor and bobsledder
- Sam Junqua (born 1996), soccer player
- Eesha Khare (born 1995), inventor
- Ernest Konnyu (born 1937), Republican Congressman who resided in Saratoga while in office.
- Anil Kumar (born 1958), management consultant who pled guilty to insider trading
- Sam Liccardo (born 1970), U.S. representative and mayor of San Jose
- Beth Lisick (born 1968), spoken-word artist, leader of the band The Beth Lisick Ordeal, and author
- Patrick Marleau (born 1979), former San Jose Sharks player
- Abijah McCall, orchardist and inventor of the Fresno Scraper
- Mekenna Melvin (born 1985), actress
- Pranav Mistry, (born 1981), Indian-born computer scientist and inventor
- Joe Murray (born 1961), Emmy-winning animator, best known as the creator of Rocko's Modern Life and Camp Lazlo.
- Anil Raj (1984–2019), humanitarian activist, killed in terror attack in Kabul in 2019 while working for U.N.
- James Rumbaugh (born 1947), computer scientist
- Dan Rusanowsky (born 1960), radio broadcaster
- Vincent Sheu (born 1990), Rubik's Cube speedsolver
- Ed Solomon (born 1960), screenwriter (Men in Black)
- Steven Spielberg (born 1946), filmmaker (graduated from Saratoga High, having attended it for his senior year)
- Mark Suciu (born 1992), professional skateboarder
- Vienna Teng (born 1978), singer
- Joe Thornton (born 1979), former San Jose Sharks captain
- Niko Tsakiris (born 2005), soccer player
- Lance Guest (born 1960), actor
- Kerri Walsh (born 1978), Gold Medal-winning Olympian (beach volleyballer)
- Andy Weir (2021–2023), science fiction author and programmer
- James Williamson (born 1949), electronics engineer and guitarist of the Stooges
