= Loren Toews =

American football player (born 1951)

No. 51
- Position: Linebacker

Personal information
- Born: November 3, 1951 (age 75); Dinuba, California, U.S.
- Listed height: 6 ft 3 in (1.91 m)
- Listed weight: 220 lb (100 kg)

Career information
- High school: Del Mar (San Jose, California)
- College: California
- NFL draft: 1973: 8th round, 192nd overall pick

Career history
- Pittsburgh Steelers (1973–1983)

Awards and highlights
- 4× Super Bowl champion (IX, X, XIII, XIV)

Career NFL statistics
- Sacks: 16
- Fumble recoveries: 10
- Interceptions: 4
- Stats at Pro Football Reference

Loren James Toews (born November 3, 1951) is an American former professional football player who was a linebacker in the National Football League (NFL). He played college football for the California Golden Bears.

Toews graduated from Del Mar High School in San Jose, California and later the University of California, Berkeley, where he received his degree in biological sciences. In 1972, Toews was named the "most inspirational player" for the Golden Bears and given the Stub Allison Award, named after California football coach Leonard B. "Stub" Allison.

That following year, in 1973 Toews was selected 192nd overall in the eighth round by the Pittsburgh Steelers where he played as a linebacker for 11 seasons. While playing for the Steelers, Toews attended the University of Pittsburgh's Graduate School of Business and obtained his MBA degree in 1981.

Toews was a four-time Super Bowl champion, and starter in Super Bowl XIII. In Super Bowl IX he replaced an injured Andy Russell for most of the second half, filling in admirably. Toews moved to left inside linebacker in 1982 when the Steelers switched to the 3–4 defense, while incumbent middle linebacker Jack Lambert moved to right inside linebacker and retained the "Mike" role as the Steelers signal-caller on defense.

Toews retired from professional football at spring camp in 1984 having played in 57 consecutive games up to the last game of the previous season.

Toews has a wife, Valerie and is also the father of three children: Aaron, Jocelyn and Cassandra. Aaron was a defenseman on the Northeastern University hockey team from 1996 to 1998. Jocelyn owns an independent record label called Lujo Records.

Toews lives in the San Francisco Bay Area where he and his younger brother Jeff (who also played in the NFL as an offensive lineman) buy and sell real estate.
