= Jon Nakamatsu =

American musician

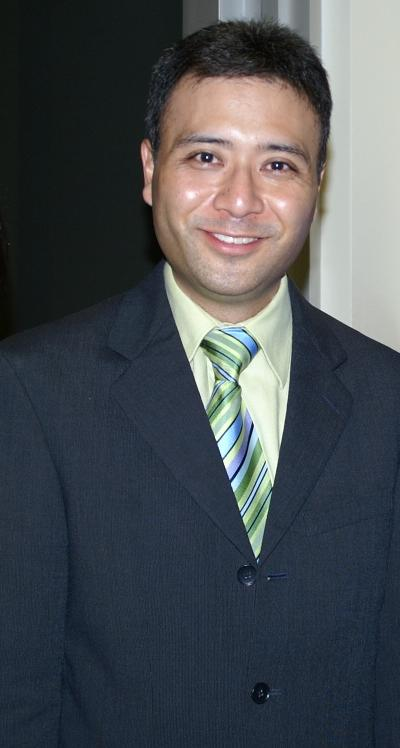
Jon Nakamatsu at the Peninsula Symphony concert, San Mateo, California on October 21, 2005

Jon Yasuhiro Nakamatsu (born 1968 in San Jose, California) is an American classical pianist who resides in San Jose.

== About ==
He is the son of David Y. Nakamatsu, a San Jose electrical engineer, and Karen F. Maeda Nakamatsu, a city employee. He was raised in nearby Sunnyvale, California and attended Prospect High School and Stanford University before becoming a German teacher at St. Francis High School in Mountain View.

In June 1997 Nakamatsu won the Gold Medal at the Tenth Van Cliburn International Piano Competition in Fort Worth, Texas. He was the first American to win this prize since 1981. Immediately following the competition, he quit his job as a high school German teacher to pursue a career as a classical pianist. He did not attend a music conservatory or major in music while he attended college and graduate school.

During the summer of 2005, Nakamatsu toured with the San Jose Youth Symphony in Spain, performing the Rachmaninoff Piano Concerto No. 2, and in June 2007, he toured with the Peninsula Youth Orchestra to Budapest, Prague, and Teplice playing the same piece. During the summer of 2008, he also toured with the Stanford Symphony Orchestra to China, playing Gershwin's "Rhapsody in Blue."

== Education ==
- Studied piano privately with Marina Derryberry since age 6 (1974).
- Graduated from Prospect High School, Saratoga, California, 1986
- A.A. Associate of Arts degree, Foothill College (community college), Los Altos Hills, California, 2000 (officially awarded long after degree requirements met)
- B.A. Bachelor of Arts degree in German Studies, Stanford University, California, 1991
- M.A. Master of Arts degree in Education, Stanford Graduate School of Education, California, 1992

== Career ==
- May–June 2007: Regular Jury member, Fifth International Piano Competition for Outstanding Amateurs, Fort Worth, Texas
- 2006-current: Co-Artistic Director of Cape Cod Chamber Music Festival (with Jon Manasse)
- June 2000: Regular Jury member (preliminaries only), Second International Piano Competition for Outstanding Amateurs, Fort Worth, Texas
- June 1999: Regular Jury member (all three rounds), First International Piano Competition for Outstanding Amateurs, Fort Worth, Texas
- 1997–current: Full-time pianist
- 1991–1997: German language teacher at Saint Francis High School in Mountain View, California and part-time pianist.

== Debuts ==
| venue | date |
|---|---|
| Vancouver Symphony Orchestra | 22 May 2009 |

== Trivia ==
- Named Debut Artist of the Year in 1998 by National Public Radio’s Performance Today
- Was featured in Reader's Digest in June 1998
- Has been profiled on CBS Sunday Morning

== Discography ==
compact discs
| | title | label | date | catalog number | notes |
|---|---|---|---|---|---|
| 1. | Tenth Van Cliburn International Piano Competition, Jon Nakamatsu, Gold Medalist | Harmonia Mundi | June 1997 | HMU 907218 (CD) | |
| 2. | Chopin Selected Works | Harmonia Mundi | October 1998 | HMU 907244 (CD) | |
| 3. | Lukas Foss, Piano Concertos, Elegy for Anne Frank | Harmonia Mundi | April 2001 | HMU 907243 (CD) | out of print |
| 4. | Sergei Rachmaninov: Piano Concerto No. 3, Rhapsody on a Theme of Paganini; Jon Nakamatsu, piano Rochester Philharmonic Orchestra; Christopher Seaman, conductor | Harmonia Mundi | September 2001 | HMU 907286 (CD); HMU 807286 (hybrid SACD/CD) | |
| 5. | Wölfl, 4 Piano Sonatas, Piano Sonatos Op. 25 & 33 | Harmonia Mundi | November 2003 | HMU 907324 (CD) | |
| 6. | Brahms, Piano Sonata, No. 3 in F minor, Op. 5 | Harmonia Mundi | October 2004 | HMU 907339 (CD) | |
| 7. | Franz Liszt, The Dante Sonata & other works | Harmonia Mundi | 14 November 2006 | HMU 907409 (CD) | |
| 8. | George Gershwin: Piano Concerto in F, Rhapsody in Blue, Cuban Overture; Jon Nakamatsu, piano Rochester Philharmonic Orchestra; Jeff Tyzik, conductor | Harmonia Mundi | 8 May 2007 | HMU 807441 (hybrid SACD/CD) | Billboard top classical albums: issue date / rank; 13 October 2007 / not ranked in top 15; 6 October 2007 / 15; 29 September 2007 / 14; 22 September 2007 / 10; 15 September 2007 / 8; 8 September 2007 / 4; 1 September 2007 / 4; 25 August 2007 / 7; 18 August 2007 / 3; 11 August 2007 / 7; 4 August 2007 / 12; 28 July 2007 / 9; 21 July 2007 / 9; 14 July 2007 / 9; 7 July 2007 / 8; 30 June 2007 / 11; 23 June 2007 / 13; 16 June 2007 / 21 |
| 9. | Johannes Brahms: Sonatas Op. 120 Number 1 in F minor and Number 2 in E-flat major for clarinet and piano with Jon Manasse, clarinet | Harmonia Mundi | 8 January 2008 | HMU907430 (CD) | |
| 10. | Robert Schumann: Carnaval, Op. 9; Papillons, Op. 2; Piano Sonata No. 2 in G minor, Op. 22 | Harmonia Mundi | 4 March 2014 | HMU907503 (CD) | |

Nakamatsu is featured in the documentary movie "Playing with Fire": The Tenth Van Cliburn International Piano Competition, which aired on PBS television and is available on DVD.

== Awards ==
| award | competition | location | date |
|---|---|---|---|
| Gold Medalist ($20,000) | Tenth Van Cliburn International Piano Competition | Fort Worth, Texas | June 1997 (quadrennial) |
| First Prize | Fifth U.S. National Chopin Piano Competition | Miami, Florida | 1995 |
