= San Jose Youth Symphony =

Youth orchestra in California, U.S.

- Also known as: SJYS, San Jose Youth Symphony Orchestra (SJYSO), San Jose Youth Orchestra (SJYO)
- Origin: San Jose, California, United States
- Genre: Classical
- Occupation: Youth Symphony Orchestra
- Years active: 1951–present
- Members: Philharmonic Orchestra; Yair Samet; Chamber Orchestra; Yair Samet; Concert Orchestra; Scott Homer; Avant & Avance Flute Choirs; Sarah Benton; Concert Wind Ensemble; Charles Ancheta; Prelude String Ensemble; Christina Wong; Intermezzo String Ensemble; Virginia Smedberg; Percussion Ensemble; Shota Otaguro; Jazz Ensemble; Ricky Martinez; Harp Ensemble; Kristal Schwartz
- Past members: Concert Orchestra; Ben Jones; Timothy Beswick; Intermezzo String Ensemble; Susan Stein; Percussion Ensemble; Galen Lemmon
- Website: www.sjys.org

The San Jose Youth Symphony (SJYS) is a non-profit youth orchestra located in San Jose, California.

SJYS was founded in 1951. It was originally part of the San Jose Symphony as the San Jose Symphony Youth Orchestra (SJSYO). However, in 2002, when the San Jose Symphony was going through financial problems, SJSYO separated itself from the San Jose Symphony and became the San Jose Youth Symphony.

SJYS consists of two full symphony orchestras (the philharmonic and concert orchestras), a chamber orchestra, two preparatory string ensembles (the Intermezzo and Prelude String Ensembles), and five other instrumental ensembles (the Avant and Avance Flute choirs, the percussion ensemble, the concert wind ensemble, and the harp ensemble).

SJYS has received the Ambassador's Award for Cultural Diplomacy for its performances in Poland as well as letters of commendations from both the City of San Jose and Governor Arnold Schwarzenegger.

As a non-profit organization, the San Jose Youth Symphony is supported by the Silicon Valley Arts Council, the City of San Jose, the San Jose Symphony Foundation, the Steinway Society, and various other foundations and corporations.

== Ensembles ==
=== Philharmonic orchestra ===
The philharmonic orchestra, conducted by Maestro Yair Samet, is SJYS's premier orchestra. Simply referred to as the 'Phil', it is composed of approximately 100 musicians mostly of high-school age. Three concerts are offered each season, usually during December, March and June. The orchestra has performed various works across the classical music spectrum, including works of Antonio Vivaldi, Piotr Tchaikovsky, Dmitri Shostakovich, Franz Liszt, Édouard Lalo, Aaron Copland, and George Gershwin. In addition, the orchestra frequently plays with professional musicians (such as Jon Nakamatsu and Axel Strauss), winners of the symphony's Young Artist Competitions, and, formerly, winners of the Philharmonic Concerto Competitions (at present discontinued). Philharmonic Orchestra has also partnered with various other musical groups in the past, including Chanticleer, San Jose Taiko, Crystal Children's Choir, Children's Musical Theater San Jose, and other assorted non-profit or fundraising groups.

==== Benefit concerts ====
The philharmonic is also known for performing in benefit concerts, in which the net proceeds from sold tickets (and, if present, auctions) are donated to welfare causes. In 2008 and 2009, all the various groups in SJYS performed in charity concerts for Kenya Dream, a program that is raising a minimum of $100,000 to be donated to a secondary school in Kenya. In March 2010, the philharmonic dedicated their second set concert to Chile, which had suffered a massive earthquake weeks before the concert. Because Philharmonic members had toured Santiago in the summer of 2009, the SJYS Board decided to donate all the net proceeds from the March concert to Chile, even though it was a season concert. Furthermore, every Christmas season, the philharmonic performs a free benefit concert at St. Joseph's Cathedral for the Season Of Hope performance series.

==== Tours ====
Every other year, the philharmonic conducts an international tour. During the usually-two-week-long trip, the musicians are given the chance to visit important monuments and buildings, spend some time with renowned soloists and ambassadors, and perform in some of the most prestigious concert halls in the world. Often the philharmonic also combines with the countries' youth orchestras to perform massive joined concerts. Past tours have taken place in Ireland, Belgium, Germany, Poland, Austria, the Czech Republic, Japan, and Spain. In the summer of 2009, the philharmonic was the first California-based youth orchestra to tour South America, namely the countries of Chile and Argentina. In the summer of 2011, the philharmonic visited Italy, Austria, and Germany. The highlight of this tour was their concert at the world-renowned Mozarteum concert hall in Salzburg. In the summer of 2019, they visited Montevideo, Uruguay, as well as Buenos Aires and Rosario, Argentina. The philharmonic had the opportunity to perform at the Teatro Colón.

=== Chamber orchestra ===
The chamber orchestra is a new addition to SJYS, created in 2010. Conducted by Yair Samet, who also conducts the philharmonic, this ensemble is a level between the concert and the philharmonic orchestras. Like the philharmonic, the chamber orchestra is composed mostly of high school students; however, since it is oriented towards chamber music, it sports considerably fewer members. While the chamber orchestra will usually perform as an entire ensemble, members will be given the chance to play in smaller chamber as well. Samet states that "It has been a long dream of SJYS to establish a premiere Chamber Orchestra."

=== Concert orchestra ===
The concert orchestra, currently conducted by Scott Homer, is one of the two full orchestras in SJYS, with the other being the philharmonic. It is an intermediate-level ensemble with a mission of providing its musicians with a firsthand experience of playing in a full orchestra. Unlike the philharmonic, the concert orchestra does not embark on international tours, but it still has its own unofficial concerto competition within the orchestra. Several conductors have led the concert orchestra over the course of SJYS, and many of these conductors have gone on to successfully pursue other musical careers. Ben Jones, who conducted the concert orchestra from 2007 to 2009, joined the Grammy award-winning men's choir, Chanticleer.

=== Avant and Avancé Flute Choirs ===
The Avant & Avancé Flute Choirs are one of the ensembles dedicated to solely one instrument. The repertoire played by the Avancé Flute Choir is a little harder than ones of the Avant Flute Choir. Usually, members progress from one to another as their skill level increases. Currently conducted by Sarah Benton, the Flute Choirs have grown from 11 to 34 members. The repertoire consists of both classical pieces arranged for flute ensembles, and modern pieces covering genres such as jazz, pop, and ethnic. Members are often encouraged to play alto flute or bass flute for these pieces.

=== Concert winds ===
The concert wind ensemble is directed towards woodwind and brass players at the intermediate level. It is also aimed at proficient young musicians who express the desire to learn a woodwind or brass instrument. Led by Charles Ancheta, Concert Winds focuses on repertoire arranged for bands. The relatively small number of members allows for intimate practice and musical development.

=== Prelude String Ensemble ===
The Prelude String Ensemble, conducted by Heidi Modr, gives beginning musicians a chance to play in a collective group with each other. In addition to learning music theory, the students also get their first tastes of playing in an ensemble and following a conductor. Many young violinists, violists, and cellists of elementary-school age begin their first year in SJYS in Prelude and progress through the various ensembles as the years go by.

=== Intermezzo String Ensemble ===
The Intermezzo String Ensemble mostly consists of former members of the Prelude String Ensemble. Conducted by Randy Cono, Intermezzo musicians graduate from learning technical skills and begin to develop musicality that will help prepare themselves for playing in a full orchestra. While in Prelude the musicians focus on rhythm, dynamics, and other mechanical techniques, Intermezzo teaches the students skills such as listening.

=== Percussion Ensemble ===
The Percussion Ensemble is conducted by Jeff Wilson. Members of the Percussion Ensemble play a wide range of percussion instruments, from drums to marimbas and even ethnic percussion. Aside from the usually modern repertoire, the percussionists also learn about instrument care, setting up, and advanced musical techniques.

== Summer Camp ==
New and returning musicians alike are encouraged to participate in a weeklong summer camp before the official season begins, where they are given the chance to meet their conductors and get to know their fellow SJYS members. While the Prelude, Intermezzo, and chamber orchestra musicians attend a day camp together, usually at J.F.S. Elementary School in San Jose, all other ensembles (Flute Choir, Wind Ensemble, Concert Orchestra, and Philharmonic Orchestra) spend the week overnight at Santa Clara University. Those at the overnight camp also attend sectionals with professional orchestra musicians as well as master classes with renowned musicians; philharmonic and concert members are also required to go through seating auditions. Here is a rough schedule of the overnight camps: In the morning, breakfast is provided, and is followed by a rehearsal until noon. At noon, lunch is provided, which is followed by an activity, depending on the day. (e.g. a masterclass, sightreading session, seating auditions, individual practice, etc.) Dinner is served around 6 p.m., which is followed by an evening rehearsal until around 9:30 p.m. Then, is the last thing of the day: evening activities. The activities every day are different, but are all intended to be fun. These activities include music jeopardy, carnival games, a talent show, etc. Members return to their dorms at 11 p.m., and are encouraged to sleep at 11:30 p.m., in order to feel energetic throughout the day. On the last day, there is a dress rehearsal, and a concert in the evening.

== Rehearsals ==
Rehearsals and the official SJYS season begin in September, usually within the first couple of weeks, and end with the last season concert, usually in June. SJYS has rehearsed in many well-known institutions in the Bay Area, including the San Jose Civic Auditorium, the San Jose Center for the Performing Arts, Castillero Middle School, and River of Life Christian Church. Currently, most of the ensembles rehearse in the Los Gatos United Methodist Church on Monday evenings. Only three ensembles do not – the chamber orchestra rehearses at Archbishop Mitty High School on Sunday afternoons (because the conductor cannot be in two places at once), Concert Winds at Branham High School on Monday evenings, and the Percussion Ensemble at Valley Christian High School on Wednesday evenings. Those ensembles with older students tend to rehearse longer than the preparatory and intermediate ensembles; the philharmonic and chamber orchestra rehearse for three hours as compared to two for Prelude and Intermezzo. Rehearsals occur almost every week, even on holidays such as Labor Day and Martin Luther King Jr. Day. There is, however, a two-week break in December for the holidays.

== Concerts ==
Musicians are required to perform in two or three concerts with their respective ensembles. These are season concerts, which demonstrate the students’ progress with SJYS. Each season concert has a different repertoire, but the members may receive some or all of the music at summer camp. With the exception of the philharmonic, the season concerts usually consist of two or three ensembles at the same venue. The usual groupings follow:

- Prelude and Intermezzo currently perform at the Jewish Community Center of Silicon Valley
- Flute choir and concert orchestra (joined by chamber orchestra in the last concert) currently perform at Archbishop Mitty High School
- Concert winds and percussion ensemble perform at Valley Christian High School
- The philharmonic performs independently at the California Theatre

In addition to these places, SJYS has performed their season concerts at San Jose State University and Le Petit Trianon Theatre.

=== Other concerts ===
In addition to the season and summer camp concerts, SJYS members may be asked to perform in other concerts for special occasions. Two notable examples are the annual philharmonic holiday concert at Cathedral Basilica of St. Joseph and the philharmonic's Bon Voyage Concert featuring all musicians going on tour. It is not only the philharmonic that performs these additional concerts –other ensembles are often called on to perform at senior homes, holiday concerts, and many other special venues. The flute choir, for example, has performed annually at the tree-lighting ceremony in Santana Row. Occasionally, all ensembles are invited to perform for a special cause.
