= Campbell Union High School District =

Public school district in California, United States

Campbell Union High School District (CUHSD)

Address
- 3235 Union Avenue San Jose, California, 95124; United States

District information
- Type: Public
- Grades: 9-12
- Established: August 13, 1900; 126 years ago
- Superintendent: Robert Bravo
- NCES District ID: 0607230

Students and staff
- Students: 8,606 (2020–2021)
- Teachers: 377.79 (FTE)
- Staff: 264.95 (FTE)
- Student–teacher ratio: 22.78:1

Other information
- Website: www.cuhsd.org

Campbell Union High School District (abbreviated as CUHSD) is a school district based in Santa Clara County, California, serving the Silicon Valley communities of San Jose, Campbell, Saratoga, Santa Clara, Los Gatos and Monte Sereno.

It operates six high school campuses, Branham, Del Mar, Leigh, Prospect, Westmont, and Boynton; as well as Campbell Adult and Community Education. It serves more than 8600 students, and employs 800 teachers and staff. Since 1986, schools in the district have been recognized as distinguished schools 7 times, the last being in 2007. As of 2022, the superintendent is Robert Bravo.

== Boundary ==
The CUHSD serves the entirety of Campbell, portions of San Jose, Santa Clara, Saratoga, Los Gatos and Monte Sereno and the unincorporated communities of Burbank, Cambrian Park and Fruitdale.

== Schools ==
The following are schools operated by the CUHSD:

School name	City	Students	FTE Teachers	Pupil/Teacher Ratio	Notes
Boynton High School	San Jose	196	15.10	12.98	Alternative school
Branham High School	San Jose	1911	79.45	24.05	
Camden Post-Secondary Academy	San Jose				
Campbell Adult & Community Education	San Jose				
Del Mar High School	San Jose	1326	65.45	20.26	
Leigh High School	San Jose	1786	74.18	24.08	
Prospect High School	Saratoga	1573	67.76	23.21	
Westmont High School	Campbell	1723	70.85	24.32	

Note: Student enrollment figures based on 2020-2021 school year data

The following are now closed schools formerly operated by the CUHSD:

School name	City	Year closed	Notes
Blackford High School	San Jose	1991	Campus is now partially used for Boynton Alternative High School
Branham High School	San Jose	1991	Re-opened in 1999
Camden High School	San Jose	1980	
Campbell High School	Campbell	1980	

== Board of trustees ==
The five-member board of trustees, which establishes policies for the district includes Elisabeth Halliday, James Kim, Jason Baker Aine O'Donovan, and Linda Goytia. Members are elected to staggered four-year terms.

- Elisabeth Halliday's term expires in 2026
- James Kim's term expires in 2026
- Jason Baker's term expires in 2026
- Aine O'Donovan's term expires in 2024
- Linda Goytia's term expires in 2024

== History ==
Campbell Union High School District was organized on August 13, 1900. The first high school to open its doors as part of the district was Campbell High School (now closed) on September 14, 1900 with a registration of 35 students, consisting of 23 girls and 12 boys. Two teachers were hired to educate the students: Professor E. A. Powers and Miss J. M. Newton. The first graduating class was one student, Charles Beardsley, who went on to Stanford and became a lawyer, thus proving Campbell High School's academic merit.

In the late '50s, the district began to plan for the baby boom after World War II, and began building additional campuses. First was Camden High School (closed in 1980), which opened in 1955, after which followed Del Mar, which opened in 1957, then Blackford (now closed under that name) in '59, Leigh in '60, then Westmont in '65, Branham in '66, and Prospect in '68. The largest campus is Leigh, the smallest is Prospect. Most of the campuses built in that era follow the same general design plan, including a quad as an important fixture, and rows of wings of classrooms. The superintendent of the CUHSD at the time of the district's expansion, Larry Hill, made a deal with the brickyard adjacent to Del Mar High School, (which is now Del Mar's football Bowl), to get the 'clinker' bricks at a discount. These were used in all the schools the district was building at the time, which is why many of the older buildings have a lot of brick in them.

Larry Hill, (a.k.a. Laurance J. Hill), was also Campbell High School's principal, beginning in 1946, and is credited with much of the district's growth and planning in his years in office, which ended in 1969. An award in his name is given out every year at each high school in the district.

Campbell High School, although the namesake school of the district, was closed in 1982, because of declining enrollment in the area and in the district. Westmont and Del Mar's attendance boundaries subsequently expanded to pick up the slack. In 1985, after some negotiating, the City of Campbell purchased the campus, including the historic Heritage Theater, (built in 1938), and it became the Campbell Community Center.

Branham High School was closed in 1990 and leased to Valley Christian until 1999, when the district decided it should be reopened. The result of its closure is that many of the other schools in the district still use equipment designated as belonging to Branham, although it is now open again. The first year Branham only had classes of freshmen and sophomores. The redistricting that took place for Branham in 1999 affected Leigh and Del Mar the most, the attendance boundaries stretching north to Campbell, and west to Camden.

Blackford as a comprehensive high school closed in 1990, and became a continuation high school. In 2002, the district built a new facility on the same site as Blackford, and moved the continuation high school there, renaming it Boynton, after its street address. They now lease out the Blackford campus to various other tenants.

== Technology ==
The district network consists of 10 Gbit/s connections providing students and staff access to internal resources and 20 Gbit/s internet connection. All students and teachers have a district email account, which is run from the servers at the district office, and all teachers enter final grades electronically through AERIES, which allows students to access their transcripts and other official documents. Since the COVID-19 pandemic began, the district has been using Canvas as the main platform in which teachers enter grades, communicate with students and parents.
