= Leigh High School =

Public secondary school in San Jose, California, United States

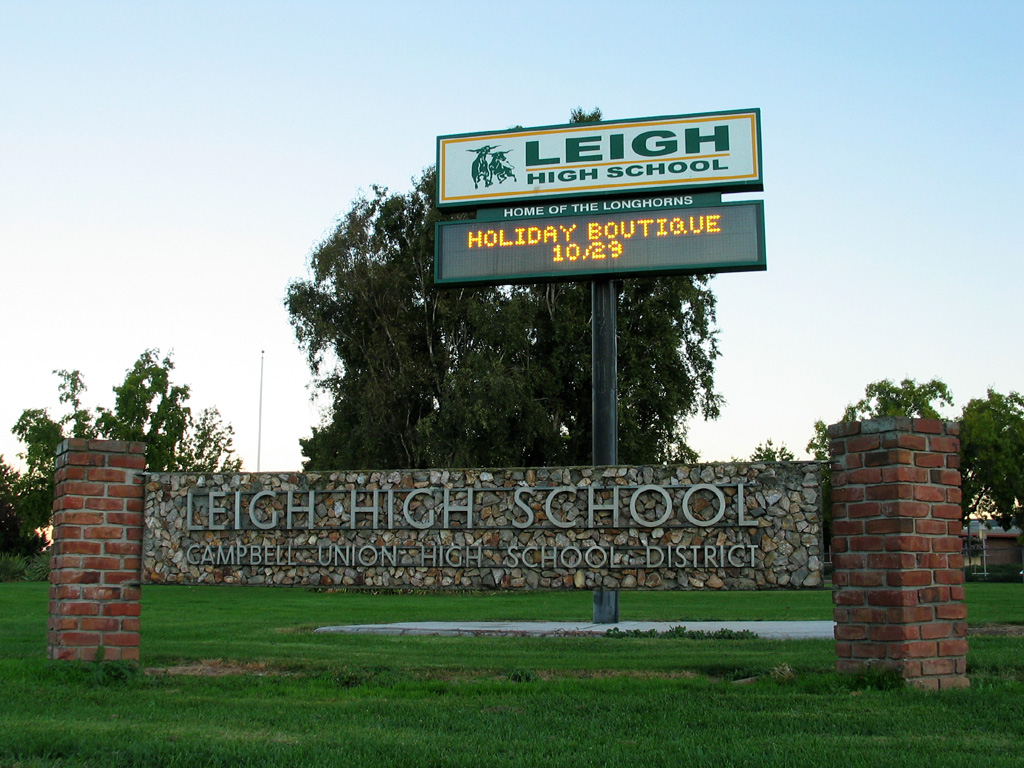
- The Leigh High School billboard

Location
- 5210 Leigh Avenue; San Jose, California 95124; United States; 37°14′32″N 121°55′16″W

Information
- School type: Public, comprehensive high school
- Founded: 1962
- School district: Campbell Union High School District (CUHSD)
- Oversight: Western Association of Schools and Colleges, Accrediting Commission for Schools
- Superintendent: Robert Bravo
- Principal: Michelle Steingart
- Faculty: 80
- Teaching staff: 74.99 (FTE)
- Grades: 9–12
- Enrollment: 1,816 (2023-2024)
- Student to teacher ratio: 24.22
- Language: English
- Campus: Suburban
- Area: Santa Clara County
- Colors: Forest green and gold
- Mascot: Longhorn
- Team name: Longhorns
- Feeder schools: Union Middle School; Dartmouth Middle School; Ida Price Middle School
- Website: Leigh High School

Leigh High School is a secondary school located in the West San Jose region of San Jose, California, United States. Opening in September 1962, it was the fifth school established in the Campbell Union High School District. The school has twice been given the California Distinguished School award, in 1999 and 2003. As of 2020, the school's enrollment was 1809 students. The school colors are gold (yellow) and pine green, and its mascot is the Longhorn. The school was named for Hugh Alexander Leigh (1855–1917), a leading local horticulturist.

== Academics ==
Leigh is an academically successful high school, with rankings placing it above average when compared to others in California. The average SAT scores of students were the highest in the district in 2000, and were above the state and national averages. The California Department of Education's Academic Performance Index of Leigh High School gave it a ranking of 9 within the state, and a relative ranking of 2. Ninety percent of Leigh graduates go on to attend either university or community college after graduation.

Leigh's 1,600+ students annually score above the state and national averages on the STAR, CAHSEE, SAT, and Advanced Placement tests. Leigh also serves a large special education population through its Resource, Special Day Class, Emotionally Disturbed, and Beacon programs. Maintaining an average class size of thirty students, Leigh provides a comprehensive curriculum that includes instructional programs designed for college-bound, special education, and vocational students.

=== Special education programs ===
The school's AVID program (Advancement Via Individual Determination) was in place for four years.

Silicon Valley Career Technical Education offers interested students a variety of vocational training in areas such as multimedia, cosmetology, managerial accounting, electrical maintenance, and auto body repair.

All high school students in the county's Deaf and Hard of Hearing program attend classes at Leigh. Some take sheltered classes with other deaf students, but many are mainstreamed into classes with Leigh's hearing population.

Specialized academic instruction classes are considered for students with IEPS and certain learning needs.

== Music programs ==
Leigh High School is noted in the Campbell Union High School District for its many musical programs. Leigh offers a symphonic band, a wind ensemble, and two jazz ensemble, with symphonic band, wind ensemble, and one of the jazz bands requiring an audition while concert band does not. The music program offers both Winter Percussion and Winter Guard programs, the latter of which has become a World Guard and has ranked in the finals at world competitions.

Leigh also offers choir as a year-long class for all grades.

As of the 2008–2009 school year, the music program's parent association changed its original name from Instrumental Music Parents' Association, to Performing Arts Parents' Association (PAPA), due to the combination of Leigh High School's drama, choir, and band programs.

Leigh High School' has a concert choir, symphonic band, wind ensemble, two jazz bands, and marching band. They also have an AP music theory class.

=== Leigh High School Marching Band ===
Marching band is one of the school's most popular and renowned activities, usually bringing in more than 100 students per season. It includes a drumline, a front ensemble, a colorguard, woodwind instruments, and brass instruments.

The marching band competes in the Western Band Association competitions in the fall, along with the Northern California Band Association competitions. They also perform their competition show at most home football games.

Pre-marching season preparation for the band includes a few clinics and two band camps, each a weekend long.

Marching band field shows usually consist of an opener, a ballad, a percussion feature, and a closer. In addition to a band director and staff members, the marching band is led by student captains and section leaders.

In the winter of 2012, the Leigh High School Marching Band traveled to San Diego to perform in the Bridgepoint Education Holiday Bowl. They marched in the Big Bay Balloon Parade, were selected to perform their show during pregame, and were also a part of a combined halftime show with other schools from around the nation. Later, in 2021, they took part in the Western Band Association Regional Championship. The band took first in the 3A division.

=== Symphonic band ===
Symphonic band is a performance-based ensemble for students who have prior experience on their instrument and the ability to read music. The ensemble consists of wind instruments and percussion.

=== Wind Ensemble ===
Wind Ensemble is an audition-only ensemble conducted by Alexander Christensen that performs frequently and includes travel to festivals nationwide. On odd years the group strives to perform out of the country, and performed in Europe in 2011. On even years they take smaller trips, such as to San Francisco, to perform.

In March 2019, Wind Ensemble traveled to New York and performed in Carnegie Hall. Their performance was ranked Gold (the highest ranking a band can get).

In March 2023, Wind Ensemble traveled to Chicago and performed at Symphony Center. Their performance was ranked Gold (the highest ranking a band can get).

== Athletics ==
Students at Leigh High School compete in a variety of interscholastic sports, usually at the highest level available to them. Many teams have won regional championships.

In only the second year of the school's existence, the 1964 varsity football team tied for the league championship. This was followed up by the 1966 varsity football team that won the league title outright. In 1970 the varsity football team again won the league title with a record of 11–1, its lone loss coming in the inaugural County Championship game against Los Altos Hills (30–23). Leigh also won back-to-back Mount Hamilton division league championship titles in 1994 and 1995, losing one regular season game and having one tie in that span. The 2001–2002 varsity football team was runner-up in the Central Coast Section Championship. The 2004 varsity football team also shared the league championship with Oak Grove High School.

In the mid-1970s, Leigh High was noted for its cross country dynasty under the coaching of Homer Latimer, and in 1974 the Longhorns won the national title. The school's proximity to the foothills of the Santa Cruz Mountains, where runners trained vigorously year-round, was a significant contributor to the program's success.

The school won the California Central Coast Championship in Baseball in 2000 and 2021.

== Campus and facilities ==
Leigh is currently in the final stages of its building renovations, which were initiated by a ninety-five million dollar local school bond measure passed in 1999. All playing fields, the library, the cafeteria, and a majority of the classrooms have been renovated. The administration offices, student quad, art classrooms, and former music classrooms are next in line for renovation. Because Leigh High School was built in 1962, building renovations will continue until the school is completely retrofitted for education in the 21st century.

== Notable alumni ==
- A. J. Allmendinger - professional racecar driver
- Susan Atkins - convicted murderer and Manson family member (attended but did not graduate)
- Ray Barbee - professional skateboarder
- Stan Bunger - radio personality (KCBS)
- Ken Caminiti - NCAA All-American in baseball, San Jose State; former MLB player with the Houston Astros and San Diego Padres
- Sam Delaplane (born 1995) - former professional baseball pitcher
- Kelly Gray - Major League Soccer player, San Jose Earthquakes
- Kit Lathrop - former NFL lineman, Denver Broncos, Green Bay Packers, Kansas City Chiefs, and Washington Redskins
- Nick 13 - guitarist, vocalist for Tiger Army
- Patrick Simmons - singer, songwriter, and guitarist with The Doobie Brothers
- Randy Stonehill - Christian music singer-songwriter
- Jason Sutter - drummer
- Jim Wahler - former defensive lineman, Washington Redskins
- Jason Windsor - former MLB pitcher for the Oakland Athletics
- Getter - EDM DJ, and producer

== See also ==
- Santa Clara County high schools
- Campbell Union High School District

== Sources ==
- Miskulin, George F. A History of The Campbell Union High School District (1900–1988). pp. 25–26.
- WASC/CDE Self-Study Report
- 2010 Growth API School Report - Leigh High School
- Course Catalog
- Leigh SARC report
