= Boynton High School =

Location
- 901 Boynton Avenue; San Jose, California 95117-1927; United States
- 37°18′38″N 121°57′59″W

Information
- School district: Campbell Union High School District
- Teaching staff: 15.98 (FTE)
- Enrollment: 160 (2023–2024)
- Student to teacher ratio: 10.01

Boynton High School is a secondary school located in San Jose, California and is a continuation school for the Campbell Union High School District. Between 1990 and 2002 Boynton High School continuation students attended what was then Blackford High School (1961-1991). Blackford had been a traditional high school before 1991 when it was closed. After a minor disagreement amongst board members of the Campbell Union High School District, they agreed to rename the continuation high school to Boynton High School, and established a new building on the same lot as Blackford. The resources of the Blackford High School campus were being shared, and needed to be renovated in order to lease the campus to another school. Today, the neighboring former Blackford High School campus is occupied by Stratford Preparatory High School.

== See also ==
- Santa Clara County high schools
- List of closed secondary schools in California
