= Westmont High School (California) =

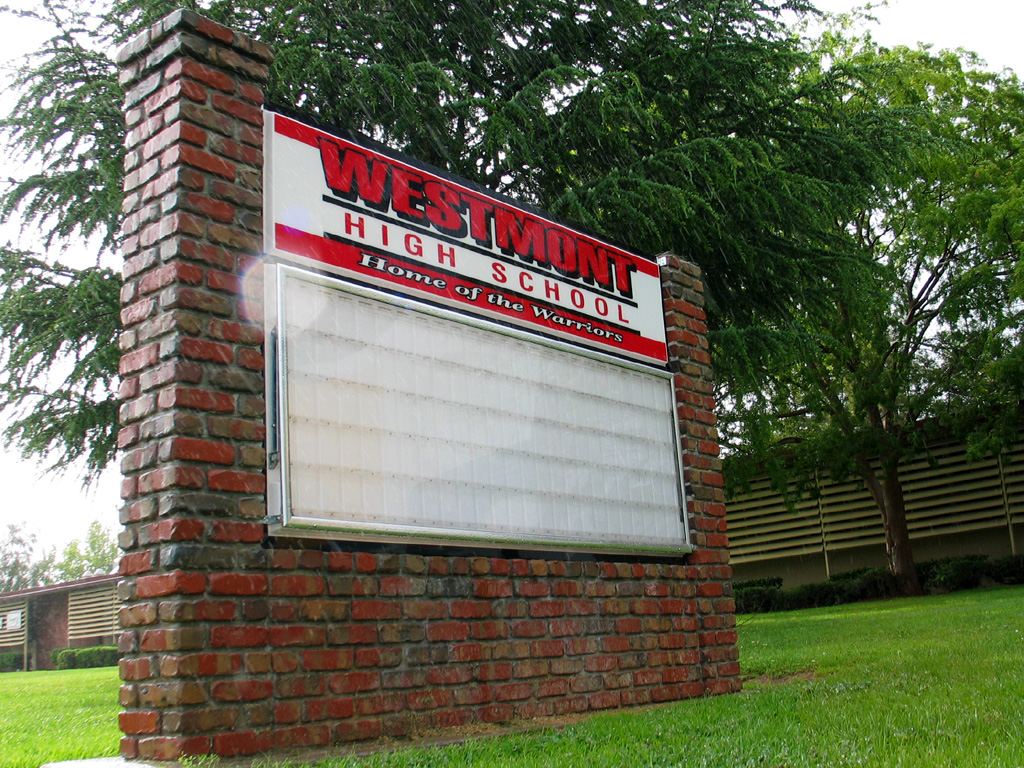

Location
- 4805 Westmont Avenue; Campbell, California 95008; United States; 37°16′17″N 121°59′06″W

Information
- School type: Public, comprehensive high school
- Motto: It's a Great day to be a Warrior!
- Established: 1964
- Status: Open
- School district: Campbell Union High School District (CUHSD)
- Superintendent: Robert Bravo
- Principal: Jason Miller
- Faculty: 74.84 (2023-2024)
- Grades: 9 - 12
- Hours in school day: 7-8 hours
- Colors: Red, white and black
- Mascot: Wally the Warrior
- Nickname: Warriors
- Team name: Warriors
- Rival: Prospect High School
- Newspaper: The Shield
- Yearbook: Ponaird
- Website: Official website

Westmont High School is located in Campbell, California, United States and is part of the Campbell Union High School District. First opened in the fall of 1964, Westmont drew students initially from both Blackford and Campbell High Schools. The school retains many academic achievements including the 1996 California Distinguished School and 1997 National Blue Ribbon School.

The school is also home to the Campbell FFA Future Farmers of America and FRC Robotics Team 3482, also known as Arrowbotics.

The school sits at the Northwest corner of the 1839 Alta California land grant, Rancho Rinconada de Los Gatos. San Tomas Aquino Creek wraps around the northern edge of the school and formed the land grant's boundary.

== Alumni ==
Notable alumni of Westmont High School include:

- Steve Cisowski, Class of 1981, Former National Football League player for the Dallas Cowboys
- Lucas Erceg, Class of 2013, Major League Baseball player for the Kansas City Royals and Oakland Athletics
- Brett Dalton, Class of 2001, actor known for his role in ABC's Agents of S.H.I.E.L.D.
- Andy Dinh, Class of 2010 (dropped out), professional gamer known as Reginald
- Martin Ferrero, Class of 1966, actor known for his roles in Jurassic Park and on Miami Vice
- Lars Frederiksen, Class of 1989, guitarist/vocalist for the punk bands Rancid and Lars Frederiksen and the Bastards
- Dan Gladden, Class of 1974, Former Major League Baseball player and baseball radio commentator
- Eric Victorino, Class of 1996, musician and poet who was the lead singer for Strata and the Limousines

== See also ==
- Santa Clara County high schools
- Campbell Union High School District
