= Prospect High School (Saratoga, California) =

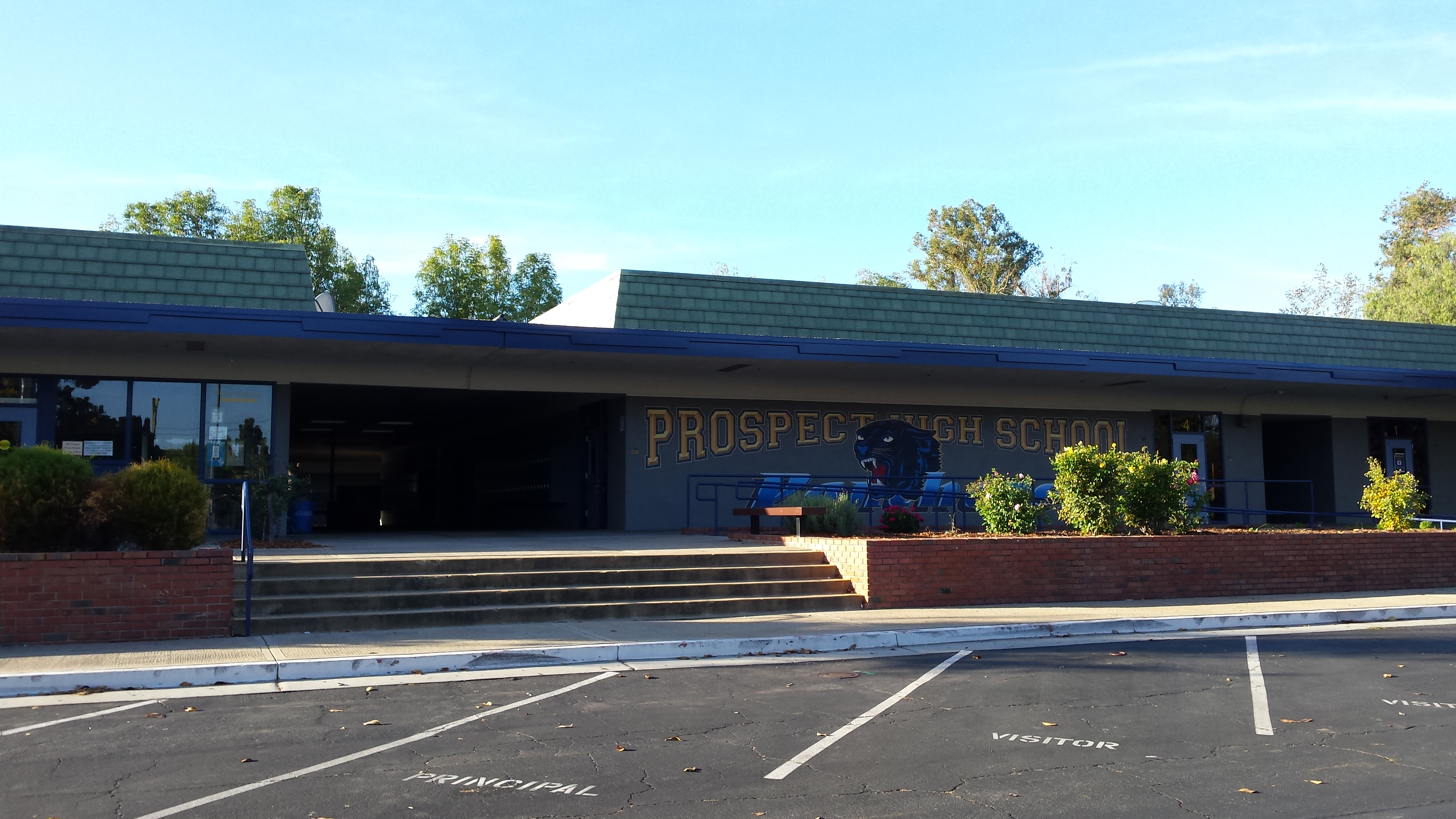

Location
- 18900 Prospect Road; Saratoga, California 95070-3435; United States; 37°17′31″N 122°00′05″W

Information
- Other name: PHS
- Type: Public high school
- Motto: Owning our future
- Established: 1968
- School district: Campbell Union High School District
- NCES School ID: 060723000673
- Principal: Markus Autrey
- Teaching staff: 66.47 (FTE)
- Grades: 9–12
- Enrollment: 1,492 (2023-2024)
- Student to teacher ratio: 22.45
- Colors: Blue and Gold
- Mascot: Panther
- Nickname: Panthers
- Yearbook: Paragon
- Website: prospect.cuhsd.org

Prospect High School is a public high school in Saratoga, California, United States. It is part of the Campbell Union High School District. The school has 1,550 students, with an average class size of 32.

== History ==
Construction of the school began on a former cherry orchard at the base of the Santa Cruz Mountains in 1966. The campus, spanning 29 acres and 14 buildings, opened in September 1968 for the 1968–1969 school year. Since 2005, the campus has been extensively renovated using district bonds from Measure C and state funds, including the completion of a $4.3 million science wing in 2004, and the installation of solar panels in both the school's parking lots in 2012.

Prospect High School is the only high school in the Bay Area with a working space observatory.

== Student activities ==
The school's mock trial team won the Santa Clara County Championship for the first time in 2006, defeating Palo Alto High School. The school has since won the county championship five more times, in 2011, 2012, 2015, 2019, and 2022.

The Prospect Debate Team was ranked 27th in the United States in 2014, rising to 9th in 2017.

== Notable alumni ==
- Grant Geissman (Class of 1971), American jazz guitarist
- Nancy McFadden (Class of 1976), American lawyer who worked as an advisor to Bill Clinton and Jerry Brown
- Wayne Koestenbaum (Class of 1976), American poet and cultural critic
- Steve Boeddeker (Class of 1984), Oscar-nominated sound editor
- Steve Harwell (Class of 1985), lead singer of Smash Mouth
- Mike Avery (Class of 1986), American athletic director, soccer coach, and former player
- Jon Nakamatsu (Class of 1986), concert pianist
- Gordy Carbone (Class of 1990), singer and radio host
- Hutch Harris (Class of 1993), songwriter and musician, and former lead guitarist/vocalist of rock band The Thermals
- Kahveh Zahiroleslam (Class of 2020), American professional soccer player

== See also ==
- Santa Clara County high schools
