= List of closed secondary schools in California =

This is a list of closed secondary schools in California.

There was a noticeable increase in closures of secondary schools starting about 1979, the year following the passage of Proposition 13. A change in funding changed the financial situation for these school districts. Schools were also closed for other reasons, including declining enrollments at the end of the Baby Boom, long term property ownership, population shift (older residents are less likely to produce new students), and white flight. Each of these local decisions were taken by individual school boards (or entities who operated private schools); many of those attributions are discussed in the linked articles.

== School name discontinued ==
Certain events, such as closure, can result in the discontinuation of a school's name. In some cases, the same location has been reopened with a similar name.

School	Location	Date discontinued	Currently at this location
Airport Junior High School	Westchester	1975	demolished
Anderson W. Clark Junior High School	Glendale	1983	reopened in 1998 as Anderson W. Clark Magnet High School
Apollo Junior High School	Anaheim	1979	demolished
Argyll Academy	Los Angeles	1982	all-girls school; evolved into co-ed Campbell Hall School under new name
Aviation High School	Redondo Beach	1981	Redondo Beach Performing Arts Center
Bellarmine-Jefferson High School (Bell-Jeff)	Burbank	2018	St. John Paul II STEM Academy at Bellarmine Jefferson
Birmingham High School	Los Angeles	2009	renamed Birmingham Community Charter High School
Blackford High School	San Jose	1991	Boynton High School continuation school and Harker Middle School (private)
Buchser High School	Santa Clara	1981	renamed Santa Clara High School
California Schools for the Deaf and Blind	Berkeley	1980	reopened in 1986 as Clark Kerr Campus, University of California, Berkeley
Camden High School	San Jose	1980	mostly torn down to make space for a shopping center; portions remain as Camden Community Center
Campbell High School	Campbell	1980	Campbell Community Center
Castro Middle School	San Jose	2006	renamed Moreland Middle School
Chester F. Awalt High School	Mountain View	1980	assumed the name of Mountain View High School when the Mountain View Union High School (Castro Street) was closed
Citrus Union High School	Glendora	1958	Citrus College remains, high school students subsequently went to Azusa High School and Glendora High School
Cogswell College	San Francisco	1930	converted to a technical college
Corvallis High School	Studio City	1987	Osaka Sangyo University of Los Angeles and Bridges Academy
Covington Junior High School	Los Altos	1980	demolished in 2001; rebuilt as Covington School (elementary)
Crescent Junior High School	Buena Park	1979	demolished for housing
Crestmoor High School	San Bruno	1980	Peninsula High School continuation school and a municipal courthouse
Ellwood P. Cubberley High School	Palo Alto	1979	Cubberley Community Center
Cypress Grove Charter High School for Arts and Sciences	Carmel	2006	Marshall West Elementary School
Excelsior High School	Norwalk	1981	Norwalk Adult School
Fermin Lasuen High School	San Pedro	1971	
Granada Hills High School	Los Angeles	1994	renamed Granada Hills Charter High School; now an LAUSD magnet school
Gladstone High School	Covina	2023	Gladstone Middle School
Warren G. Harding High School	Los Angeles	1929	Renamed University High School after University of California, Los Angeles moved to its current location.
Harry Ells High School	Richmond	1985	LoVonya Dejean Middle School
High School of Commerce	San Francisco	1952	demolished for the Louise M. Davies Symphony Hall
Dr. James J. Hogan High School	Vallejo	2011	first assigned to Springstowne Middle School; now called Dr. James J. Hogan Middle School
Holy Name Academy	Pomona	1949	Pomona Catholic High School
J. Eugene McAteer High School	San Francisco	2002	Ruth Asawa San Francisco School of the Arts
Jacob Riis High School	Los Angeles	1965	renamed Mary McLeod Bethune Junior High School
Kennedy High School	Barstow	1977	Barstow Junior High School
Kern County High School and Kern County Union High School	Bakersfield	1945	renamed Bakersfield High School in the same location
La Palma Junior High School	Buena Park	1979	Hope School - AUHSD Special Needs
La Sierra High School	Carmichael	1983	La Sierra Community Center
Loretto High School	Sacramento	2009	Aspire Alexander Twilight Secondary Academy
Los Angeles Baptist High School	North Hills, Los Angeles	2012	Heritage Christian School
Los Angeles Polytechnic High School	Los Angeles	1935	renamed John H. Francis Polytechnic High School
Los Nietos Valley Union High School	Downey	1919	renamed Downey High School
Lowell High School	Whittier	1980	Southern California University of Health Sciences
Marian High School	Chula Vista	2007	campus shuttered across 18th Street from St. Charles Catholic Church; demolished for housing; students went to the new Mater Dei Catholic High School constructed across town.
Marina High School	San Leandro	1980	converted into a continuation school which lasted until 1989; Stenzel Park now occupies part of the former campus
Marywood Central Catholic School for Girls	Orange	1980	Demolished for new housing – 2016
McNally Intermediate	La Mirada	1979	Property purchased by Biola College (now Biola University)
Mercy High School	San Francisco	2020	
Mercy High School, Carmichael	Carmichael	1983	all-girls school, demolished for medical offices and parking garage for adjacent Dignity Health Mercy San Juan Medical Center.
Metropolitan Arts and Technology High School	San Francisco	2013	merged with Metropolitan Arts and Technology High School
Miraleste High School, Palos Verdes	Palos Verdes	1991	renamed Miraleste Intermediate School
Montclair College Preparatory School	Van Nuys	2012	
Monte Vista High School	Whittier	1979	Los Angeles County Sheriff's Department Training Center
Mount Carmel High School	Los Angeles	1976	formerly at 7011 South Hoover Street, Mt. Carmel Park; the actual demolition of the school was used in the movie Rock 'n' Roll High School which used the school as a location
Mountain View Union High School	Mountain View	1980	closed and demolished for housing; portions of the campus remain as Eagle Park; Chester F. Awalt High School was then renamed Mountain View High School
Neff High School	La Mirada	1979(?)	Note cde.ca.gov incorrectly list closure date in 1989.. Final class to graduate was 1979
Norte Del Rio High School	Sacramento	1989	In 2007, Grant Joint Union High School District merged into Twin Rivers Unified School District; campus is now Martin Luther King Jr. Technology Academy, a middle school.
Notre Dame High School	San Francisco	1981	Notre Dame Senior Plaza
Oakland Aviation High School	Oakland	2011	original location: abandoned; 2010 relocation: commercial office space
Pacific Christian on the Hill	Hermon	2004	now the Los Angeles International Charter High School
Pacific High School	San Leandro	1983	demolished; now Marina Square Center Outlet Mall
Palisades High School	Los Angeles	1993	renamed Palisades Charter High School
Peterson High School	Sunnyvale	1981	became Marian A. Peterson Middle School
Pius X High School	Downey	phased out by 1998	St. Matthias High School
Pleasant Hill High School	Pleasant Hill	1980	reopened in 1997 as Pleasant Hill Middle School
Pomona Catholic Boys High School	Pomona	1967	Damien High School
Ravenswood High School	East Palo Alto	1976	demolished, now Gateway 101 Shopping Center
Red Hill Middle School	San Anselmo	1985	Red Hill Community Park
Richard E. Byrd Middle School	Sun Valley	2008	renamed Sun Valley High School after Byrd Relocates to a New Campus near John H. Francis Polytechnic High School.
Riverview Union High School	Antioch	1931	Antioch Historical Society Museum
Rolling Hills High School	Rolling Hills Estates	1991	renamed Palos Verdes Peninsula High School in a consolidation of three high schools
Royal Oak High School	Covina		now Royal Oak Middle School
Samuel Ayer High School	Milpitas	1980	Milpitas Sports Center, Teen Center and Adult Education Center
Samuel Rogers Middle School	San Jose	2006	Easterbrook Discovery School K-8
San Carlos High School	San Carlos	1988	demolished for housing
San Francisco Polytechnic High School	San Francisco		mostly demolished for housing, the east gymnasium remains as the home for Acro Sports and the west gymnasium remains as the home for Circus Center
Santa Cruz Waldorf High School	Santa Cruz	2009	
Santa Rosa Christian School	Santa Rosa	2011	
Junipero Serra High School	San Diego	2020	renamed Canyon Hills High School to avoid honoring Spanish colonialism
Serramonte High School	Daly City	1981	Jefferson Union High School District office, Serramonte Del Rey
Sierra High School	Whittier	1979	Whittier Adult School, Frontier Continuation High School, Sierra Vista Alternative High School
Sir Francis Drake High School	San Anselmo	2021	renamed as Archie Williams High School
St. Elizabeth High School	Oakland	2017	Reopened 2018 as Cristo Rey De La Salle East Bay High School
South Bay Lutheran High School	Inglewood		Pacific Lutheran High School split away in 2003
Southern California Christian High School	Orange	2000	Olive Elementary School
Sunnyvale High School	Sunnyvale	1981	The King's Academy (private)
Sunset High School	Hayward	1990	Hayward Adult School
Trident Junior High School	Anaheim	1979	Gilbert South Continuation High School, Polaris Education Center, Anaheim Adult Education
University High School	Oakland	1948	became first campus of Oakland City College, which moved in 1967, becoming Merritt College; housed Oakland Technical High School while the original location was retrofitted for earthquakes in the 1970s; now part of the Children's Hospital and Research Center Oakland
University of San Diego High School	San Diego	2005	campus was demolished; school moved to Del Mar and reopened as Cathedral Catholic High School
Ursuline High School	Santa Rosa	2011	students were absorbed by Cardinal Newman High School
Venice Union Polytechnic High School	Los Angeles	1935	renamed Venice High School
Visalia High School (later called Visalia Union High School)	Visalia	1955	campus became Redwood High School, school mascot and colors went to the new Mt. Whitney High School
West Los Angeles Baptist High School	Los Angeles	2008	
William N. Neff High School	La Mirada	1981	demolished; now industrial buildings at Alondra Blvd. and Trojan Way; operated as a continuation school until 1989
Wilmington High School	Wilmington, Los Angeles		renamed Phineas Banning High School
Wilson High School	San Francisco	1996	Phillip & Sala Burton High School and Leadership High School

== Moved ==
This is a list of schools which have changed locations, resulting in closure or reuse of the old campus.

School	Location	Date moved	Currently at this location
Burroughs High School	Ridgecrest	1960	Murray Middle School
Clovis High School	Clovis	1969	in 1995 became San Joaquin College of Law
Hanford High School	Hanford	1964	Main Hall on East Campus was Demolished in 1975.
John H. Francis Polytechnic High School	Los Angeles	1957	has moved three times and has changed name once since its creation in 1897; most recent move was from what has become Los Angeles Trade-Technical College
Live Oak High School	Morgan Hill	1975	Britton Middle School
Los Angeles High School	Los Angeles	1917	now covered by the Hollywood Freeway
Lynwood High School	Lynwood	1998	on Bullis Road; now Lynwood Middle School
Moorpark High School	Moorpark	1988	Walnut Canyon Elementary School
Narbonne High School	Harbor City	1957	Alexander Fleming Middle School
Nordhoff High School	Ojai	1966	Matilija Junior High School
Oxnard High School	Oxnard	1995	demolished
Paso Robles High School	Paso Robles	1981	George H. Flamson Middle School
St. Matthias High School	Downey, formerly Huntington Park	1995	Aspire Public Schools
San Fernando High School	San Fernando	1952	San Fernando Junior High School
Sanger Union High School	Sanger	2004	Washington Academic Middle School
Santa Clara High School	Santa Clara	1981	original downtown location on Bellomy Street has been renamed Buchser Middle School; former Buchser High School on Benton Street has been renamed Santa Clara High School
Santa Maria High School	Santa Maria	1920	Ethel Pope Auditorium
Woodrow Wilson High School	Los Angeles	1970	El Soreno Middle School

== Closed and reopened ==
School	Location	Date closed	Date reopened
Branham High School	San Jose	1991	reopened 1999
Edgewood High School	West Covina	1988	reopened associated to Edgewood Middle School in 2010; first graduating class was in 2014
Juan Cabrillo Middle School	Santa Clara	1982	reopened 1992
Lawndale High School	Lawndale	1981	reopened 1997
Palos Verdes High School	Palos Verdes	1991	reopened 2002
