= Berryessa Creek =

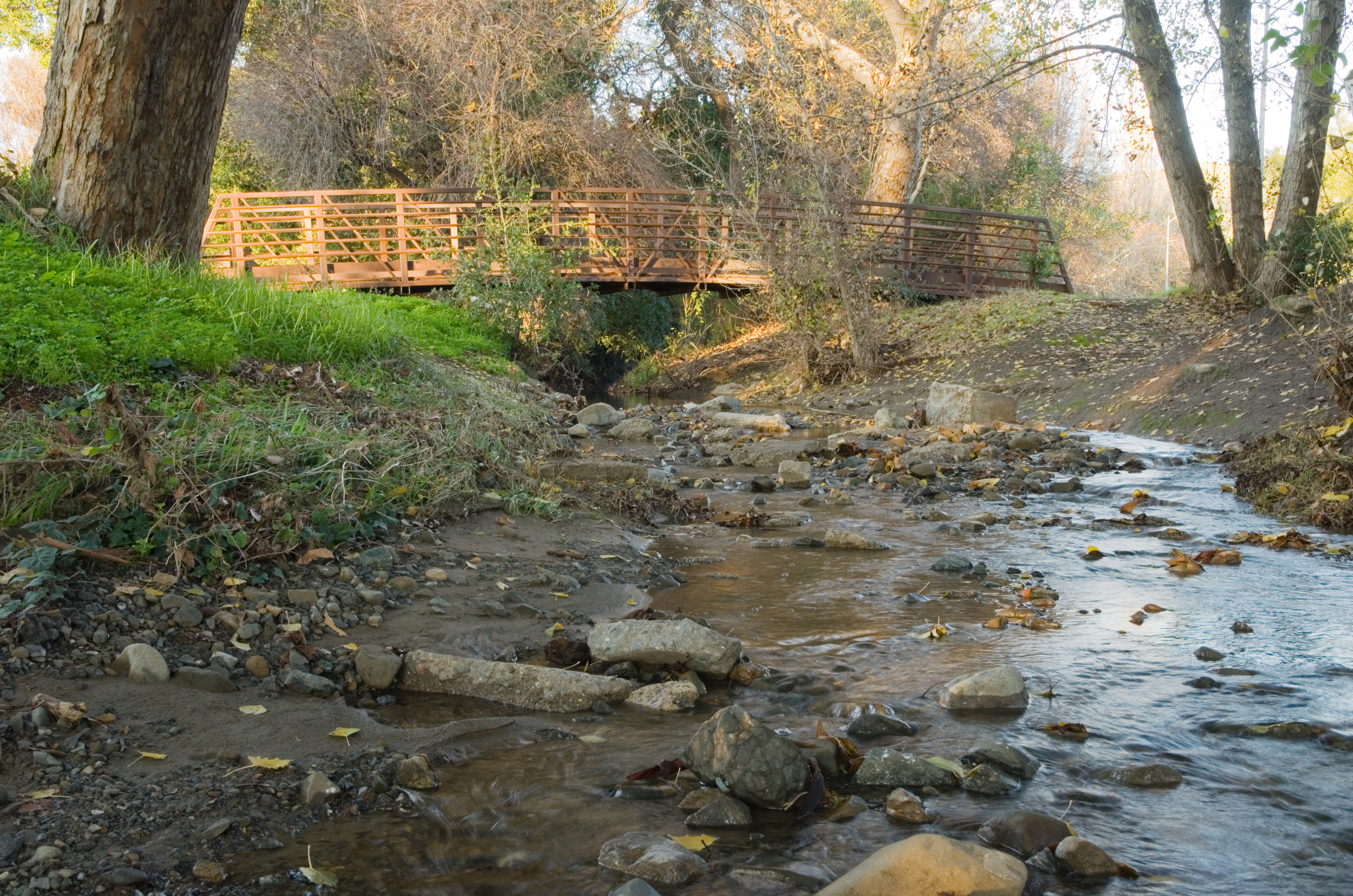
- Berryessa Creek Park, San Jose

Location
- Country: United States
- State: California
- Region: Santa Clara County

Berryessa Creek is a seasonal creek in northeastern San Jose and Milpitas. Its main source is located in the Los Buellis Hills slightly west of Felter Road. Berryessa Creek has many tributaries, including Piedmont Creek and Calera Creek. In the summer, Berryessa Creek is mostly dry except in Milpitas, where much of its water comes from urban runoff and tributaries. In winter, however, the water can rise high and pose a hazard for surrounding residences. The creek was named after a member of the prominent Basque–Spanish Berreyesa family: Nicolas Berreyesa, a Californio settler granted the Rancho Milpitas in 1834.

== Course ==
Berryessa Creek begins in the Los Buellis Hills near Felter Road. Several different forks of the creek gradually merge until Berryessa Creek becomes a single stream at Piedmont Road. The various forks are located mostly in undeveloped hills owned by a local water department and are used for cattle grazing. After crossing under Piedmont Road, Berryessa Creek forms the northern boundary of Berryessa Creek Park in the Berryessa neighborhood. At Morrill Avenue, Berryessa Creek becomes a straightened ditch. It then winds its way north into Milpitas. In Milpitas, Piedmont Creek, Arroyo de los Coches, and Calera Creek, respectively, dump into Berryessa Creek. The large creek then ends at Lower Penitencia Creek, which continues on to merge with Coyote Creek near the Newby Island Landfill at Dixon Landing Road, and then into the San Francisco Bay.

== Tributaries ==
Berryessa Creek has several tributaries that are primarily from Milpitas. Some of the tributaries are described below.

=== Piedmont Creek ===
Piedmont Creek has three or four forks beginning at private ranch properties in the eastern foothills in Milpitas. The south fork is from government property leased to cattle ranching companies and is used to graze cattle. The north fork also originates in the eastern hills but instead begins at the Silvas' private ranch. At Piedmont Road, the two forks of Piedmont Creek becomes an underground stream that winds under residences and dumps into the Berryessa Creek in an industrial zone. The entire length of the creek is only about three miles long.

=== Arroyo de los Coches ===
Arroyo de los Coches, alternatively called Los Coches Creek, is a seasonal stream from the Milpitas hills. Named in the 1800s by the Spanish, its name means "Creek of the Wild Pigs." (Los Coches Creek still has many wild pigs.) The creek begins at the former JMP Ranch that is now about to be developed into 17 single-family homes. It passes by Spring Valley Homes and travels parallel to Vista Ridge Road. Now in Ed R. Levin County Park, the creek keeps going west and then winds downhills with Calaveras Road by its side. After crossing Piedmont Road, which marks the boundary between the urban and rural sections of Milpitas, the creek turns into a straightened ditch and continues to travel parallel to Calaveras Road. After going under Interstate 680, it merges with Berryessa Creek.

=== Calera Creek ===
Calera Creek begins at north Ed R. Levin County Park from a number of springs from the west side of the Monument Peak ridge. It rushes down steep hillsides at about 45 degrees. The creek then reaches the urban parts of Milpitas as it passes by the historic Higuera Adobe. As an artificially created ditch, it then traverses through a number of housing developments and passes Milpitas High School. Calera Creek then merges with Berryessa Creek.

Calera Creek used to be a prime spot for native rainbow trout fishing. When it was converted into a ditch in the 1960s to prevent flooding the newly constructed housing developments, the creek lost almost all of its fish . The Santa Clara Valley Water District now places several plaques at the banks of Berryessa Creek informing passers-by about the ecology and environment of the creek.

37.435772°N 121.906624°W

== See also ==
- Berryessa, San Jose, California
- List of watercourses in the San Francisco Bay Area
