= Alviso (disambiguation) =

Alviso may refer to:

- Alviso, San Jose, California neighborhood
- Alviso (surname), family name
- Alviso Diedo, 15th-century Venetian naval captain
- Alviso Adobe Community Park, historic landmark park in Pleasanton, California
- José María Alviso Adobe, historic building in Milpitas, California
