= Milpitas Unified School District =

School district in California

Address
- 1331 East Calaveras Boulevard Milpitas, California, 95035; United States

District information
- Type: Public
- Grades: K–12
- Superintendent: Cheryl Jordan
- Schools: 18
- NCES District ID: 0624500

Students and staff
- Students: 10,413 (2022–2023)
- Teachers: 430.90 (FTE)
- Staff: 436.01 (FTE)
- Student–teacher ratio: 23.13:1

Other information
- Website: www.musd.org

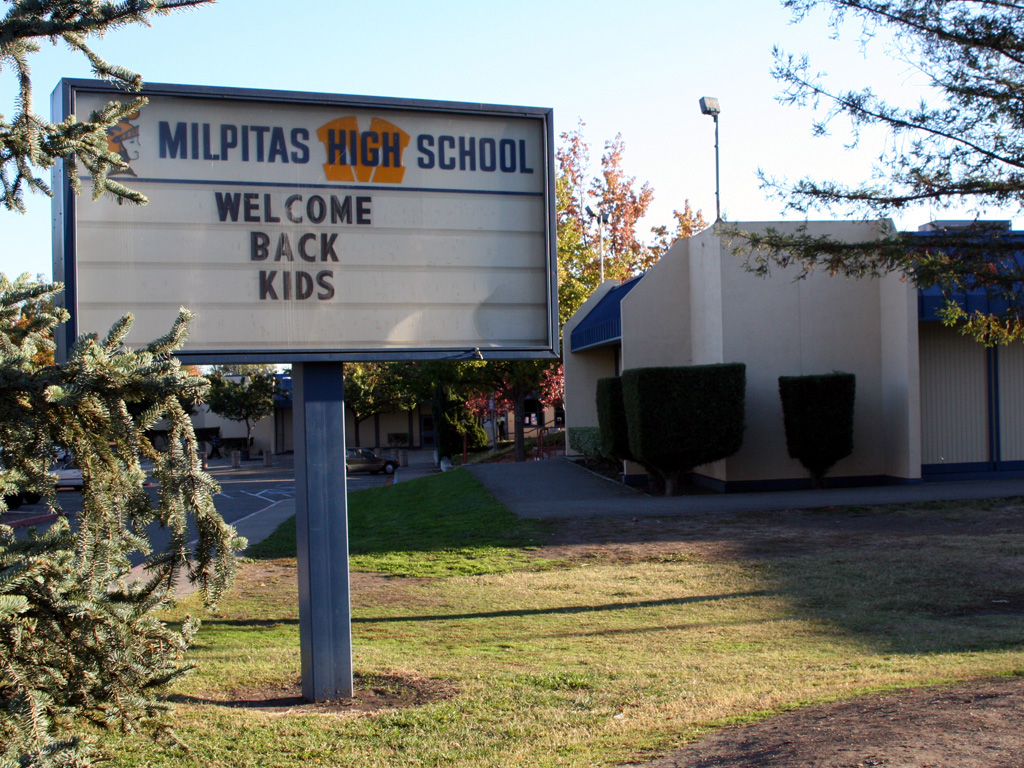
Milpitas High School

Milpitas Unified School District is a public school district in Milpitas, California. It operates two child development centers, ten elementary schools (K-6), two middle schools (7-8), one high school (9-12), one continuation high school, one adult school, and a San Jose City College extension campus. The district serves over 10,000 students in Transitional Kindergarten through Grade 12 and employs around 950 employees, including more than 460 teachers. The current superintendent is Cheryl Jordan who began in 2016.

== History ==
During the 19th and early 20th centuries, children living in Milpitas went to three different schools: Air Point School, Calaveras School, and another one where a Presbyterian church currently stands. In 1912, Milpitas Grammar School opened on Main Street and at that time was the only school in Milpitas. During the 1950s, the Milpitas Elementary School District was established which served Milpitas residents from Kindergarten through eighth grade. After finishing eighth grade, Milpitas students attended James Lick High School which is located in San Jose and is part of the East Side Union High School District.

The first schools in the district that opened were Joseph Weller Elementary School and Anthony Spangler Elementary School, which both opened in 1956 as Sunnyhills and Milpitas Elementary Schools, respectively. That same year, Samuel Ayer High School opened as the first high school in Milpitas. Alexander Rose Elementary School opened in 1959 and the district’s first middle school, Thomas Russell Middle School, opened in 1961. Gertude Abel Elementary School opened in 1962, then William Burnett Elementary School in 1963 and Curtner Elementary School in 1964. Robert Randall Elementary School opened in 1965, then Martin Murphy Elementary School in 1966. The district’s second middle school, Rancho Milpitas Middle School, and Marshall Pomeroy Elementary School both opened in 1967, followed by John Sinnott Elementary School in 1968 and Pearl Zanker Elementary School in 1969.

In December 1968, the school district was renamed Milpitas Unified School District and included Samuel Ayer High School which was previously part of the East Side Union High School District. The district opened another high school, Milpitas High School, in 1969. The two high schools co-existed until Samuel Ayer High School closed in 1980. The site where Samuel Ayer high school once stood now houses the Milpitas Sports Center, Teen Center, Adult School, and Calaveras Hills Continuation High School. The district also saw the closure of two elementary schools as well: Gertude Abel Elementary, which closed in 1978, and Martin Murphy Elementary, which closed in 1983. The sites of both these schools are currently offered for lease. Air Point School became Milpitas Community Day School which closed in 2009 and is now the site of the district's Independent Study Program.

In 2018, the district opened its tenth elementary school, Mabel Mattos Elementary School. When it opened, Mattos served nearly 250 students in kindergarten through second grades. Expansion to the school is slated to be completed and the school is expected to serve students in kindergarten through 6th grade by 2022. In the meantime, students between third and sixth grades attend either Rose or Zanker Elementary, depending on where they live.

All of Milpitas' elementary schools are named after the early settlers who cultivated the land in what is now Milpitas.

In 2022 district leadership suggested that area parents house teachers on a rent basis, as real estate became too expensive for teachers.

== Schools ==
Child Development Centers:

- Rose Child Development Center
- Sunnyhills Child Development Center

Elementary Schools (TK-6):

- William Burnett Elementary School
- Curtner Elementary School
- Mabel Mattos Elementary School
- Marshall Pomeroy Elementary School
- Robert Randall Elementary School
- Alexander Rose Elementary School
- John Sinnott Elementary School
- Anthony Spangler Elementary School
- Joseph Weller Elementary School
- Pearl Zanker Elementary School

Middle Schools (7-8):

- Rancho Milpitas Middle School
- Thomas Russell Middle School

High Schools (9-12):

- Milpitas High School
- Calaveras Hills Continuation High School
- Milpitas Middle College High School

Adult Schools:

- Milpitas Adult School
- San Jose City College Extension Program

Former Schools:

- Samuel Ayer High School (closed 1980)
- Gertude Abel Elementary School (closed 1978)
- Martin Murphy Elementary School (closed 1983)
- Milpitas Community Day School (closed 2009)
