= Alviso (surname) =

Alviso is a surname, originated as an altered form of the Basque surname Albizu. Notable people with this surname include:

- Ignacio Alviso (1772–1848), Californio ranchero and soldier
- José María Alviso (1798–1853), Californio ranchero, soldier, and politician
