= Ravenswood High School =

Ravenswood High School could refer to:

- Ravenswood High School (West Virginia)
- The former Ravenswood High School (East Palo Alto), operated 1958-1976
- Ravenswood School for Girls in Gordon, New South Wales, Australia

== See also ==
- Ravenwood High School, Brentwood, Tennessee
