= Al Endress =

American football player (1929–2023)

No. 85
- Position: Defensive end

Personal information
- Born: February 18, 1929; Oakland, California, U.S.
- Died: November 9, 2023 (aged 94)
- Listed height: 6 ft 2 in (1.88 m)
- Listed weight: 200 lb (91 kg)

Career information
- High school: Oakland (CA) St. Elizabeth
- College: Saint Mary's (CA); San Francisco State

Career history
- San Francisco 49ers (1952)

Career statistics
- Games played: 2
- Stats at Pro Football Reference

Albert James Endress (February 18, 1929 – November 9, 2023) was an American football defensive end who played for the San Francisco 49ers. He first played college football at Saint Mary's College of California before transferring to San Francisco State University. He attended St. Elizabeth High School in Oakland, California. Endress died on November 9, 2023, at the age of 94.
