= Rudy Law =

American baseball player (born 1956)

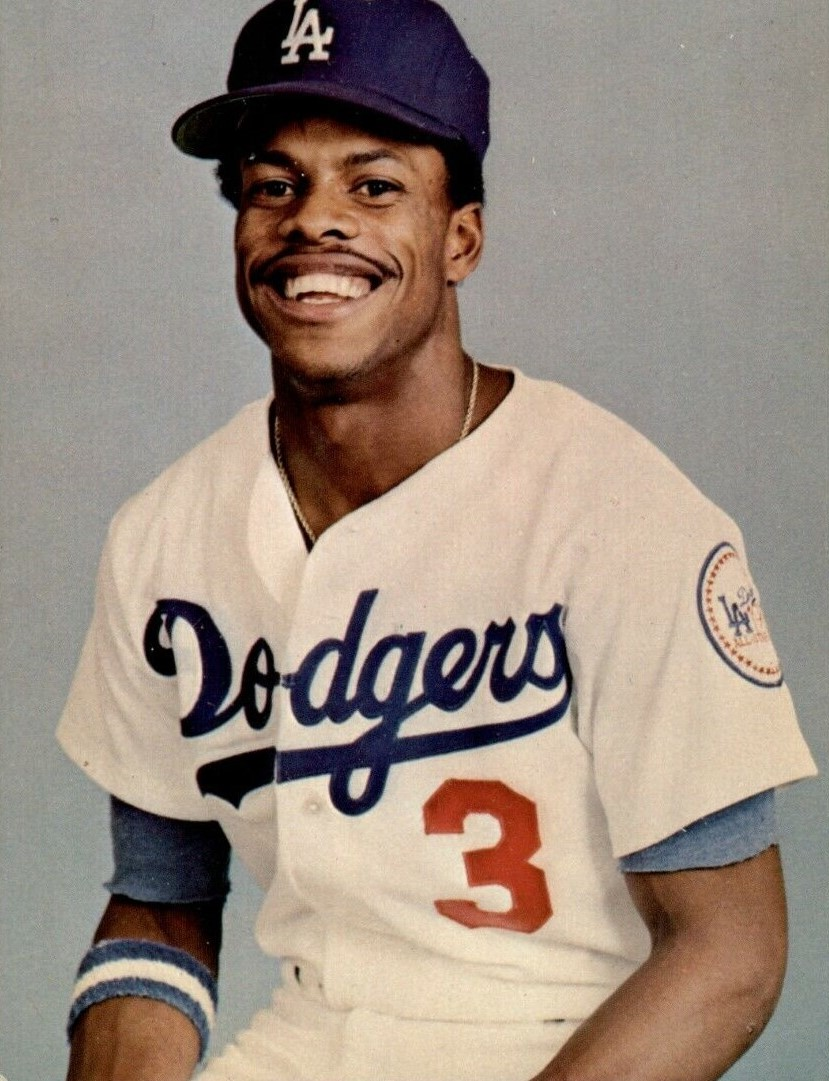
- Outfielder
- Born: October 7, 1956 (age 69); Waco, Texas, U.S.
- Batted: Left Threw: Left

MLB debut
- September 12, 1978, for the Los Angeles Dodgers

Last MLB appearance
- October 4, 1986, for the Kansas City Royals

MLB statistics
- Batting average: .271
- Home runs: 18
- Runs batted in: 199
- Stolen bases: 228
- Stats at Baseball Reference

Teams
- Los Angeles Dodgers (1978, 1980); Chicago White Sox (1982–1985); Kansas City Royals (1986)

Rudy Karl Law (born October 7, 1956) is an American former professional baseball outfielder. He played seven seasons in Major League Baseball (MLB) from 1978 to 1986 for the Los Angeles Dodgers, Chicago White Sox, and Kansas City Royals. In 1983, he stole 77 bases, setting the White Sox single-season record.

Law's play helped the White Sox win their division and get to the 1983 American League Championship Series, the franchise's first postseason appearance since 1959. He was one of the few Sox position players who came through in the ALCS, going 7-for-18 at the plate (.389) and stealing two bases. The team managed to score just three runs in the entire series and lost it to the Baltimore Orioles, three games to one.

== Biography ==
Law attended Ravenswood High School in East Palo Alto, California. Law played minor league ball for the Lodi Dodgers and in 1977 batted .386 to lead the league in batting average, and led the team to win the league championship. Rickey Henderson, who played for the Modesto A's at the time, was so impressed by Law, that he adopted aspects of Law's batting stance. He made his MLB debut at age 21 as a 1978 late-season call-up with the Dodgers, appearing in 11 games in September but not on their roster for the 1978 World Series. His best season for the Dodgers came in 1980, when he appeared in 128 games and stole 40 bases.

But with a team bound for the 1981 World Series and a season interrupted by an MLB players' strike, the Dodgers had no available spot for Law in the outfield. He spent all of 1981 in the minors, where he hit .335. Just before the beginning of the following season, the Dodgers traded Law on March 30, 1982, to the White Sox for Cecil Espy and Burwell Geiger. Though Law had a weak throwing arm and had poor instincts in the field and while baserunning, he made up for some of those deficits with his speed.

Given a chance to play in Chicago, he hit .318 during the 1982 season with 36 steals. Then came his breakout season in 1983, when as the Sox' leadoff man he had a career-high 142 hits and 77 stolen bases, the second-best total in all of baseball that year and the White Sox single-season record, breaking Luis Aparicio's record of 56. This was on a White Sox team that won the American League West title for the franchise's first postseason berth since the 1959 World Series. In 1985, the White Sox chose not to resign Greg Luzinski and shifted Law to left field to make room for center fielder Daryl Boston in the lineup. Boston was sent to the minors at the end of June, though, and Law shifted back to left field in July. After July 11, he went on the disabled list and was out until the beginning of August; he switched back and forth between center field and left field before going back to left field in September when Boston was called back up. He went four for five with two RBI, runs scored, and stolen bases in a 7–2 victory over the Minnesota Twins on September 10. "Rudy was outstanding," manager Tony LaRussa said after the game. "He did just about everything you could do as a leadoff man." Law was released by the Sox at the end of spring training in 1986, but he was quickly picked up by the Kansas City Royals. He was released by the Royals at the end of spring training in 1987, ending his MLB career at age 30.

Law, who had moved to Inglewood, California, during his stint with the Dodgers, still lived in Inglewood after his retirement.

== See also ==
- List of Major League Baseball career stolen bases leaders
