= Joseph Edward Prince =

American athlete

- Born: Joseph Edward Prince; June 25, 1954 (age 72); San Rafael, California, U.S.
- Writing career
- Subjects: Athlete, Author, athletic culture

Joseph Edward ("Joe") Prince (born June 25, 1954) is a former American athlete born in San Rafael, California, and raised in East Palo Alto, California. He ran track for the Cal Poly San Luis Obispo Mustangs. He was the 1974 CCAA Conference 220 yard sprint champion and earned NCAA College Division All-America honors. He is the subject of the 2008 documentary Liberation Saturday, which is based on his autobiography.

== Education and athletic career ==
Prince was raised by his grandparents in East Palo Alto, California; he did not meet his mother until 1971. He was diagnosed with Autism as a child; he titled his autobiography for the Saturday Liberation schools established by the Black Panthers, where he learned to read in fifth grade. He was in special education classes at Ravenswood High School when he was encouraged to become a sprinter by his track coach, 1968 Olympic 200 meter champion Tommie Smith. He attended Cal Poly San Luis Obispo, where he was on the Mustangs' All-American 440-yard relay team and was the 1974 California Collegiate Athletic Association champion in the 220-yard dash, and after transferring in 1974, graduated from Fresno Pacific College, now Fresno Pacific University, in 1977.

While at Fresno Pacific, Prince was diagnosed with testicular cancer. While still in treatment, he set 400- and 1600-meter relay records with Athletes in Action, a branch of Campus Crusade for Christ, trained with Maxie Parks and competed on the US national team in Czechoslovakia in 1978.

== Later career ==
Prince later became a bank teller and then in the mid-1990s to present day, a special education teacher and coach of track and cross country at Sahuarita High School near Tucson, Arizona. He published his autobiography, Liberation Saturday, in 2003. It was made into a documentary by Richard Knapp and Dave Verwys, which was shown at the San Diego Black Film Festival in 2008; Prince created the music for the film with former Harlem Globetrotter Nate Branch.

In 2012 he was honored by Brooks athletic wear as one of America's 25 most inspirational coaches.
