= Rancho Milpitas =

Mexican land grant

Coordinates: 37.430°N 121.870°W

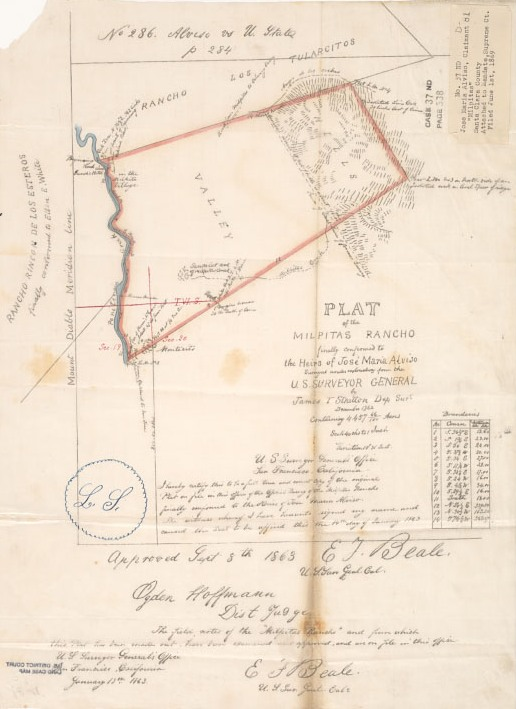
Plat (map) of the Milpitas Rancho, 1862

Rancho Milpitas was a 4,458-acre (18.04 km^{2}) Mexican land grant in Santa Clara County, California. The name comes from the Nahuatl "milpan", a term meaning "in the field". Therefore, Milpitas could be translated as "little fields". The grant included what is now the city of Milpitas.

== History ==
The land was originally granted to Nicolás Tolantino Antonio Berreyesa (1789–1863) by the alcalde of San José, Pedro Chaboya, on May 6, 1834. A neighboring parcel was granted to José María Alviso (1798–1853) by the governor of Alta California, José Castro on September 23, 1835. Alviso built the first story of the ranch house on the north east corner of the property and moved his family there.

With the cession of California to the United States following the Mexican–American War, the 1848 Treaty of Guadalupe Hidalgo provided that the land grants would be honored. As required by the Land Act of 1851, Berreyesa filed a claim for Rancho Milpitas with the Public Land Commission in 1853, but was rejected. Some members of the Berreyesa family went mad defending their land: one son ran into the hills, another died in an asylum. The family was evicted from the rancho.

Alviso hired an American lawyer (previously a butcher) to survey his land, and the new borders of the rancho included much of Berreyesa's claim. Alviso filed a claim for the grant with the Land Commission in 1852, and the grant was patented to Alviso in 1871.

Both Californio-held parcels were subject to a rush of American squatters in 1852. Berreyesa and his three sons were tricked by Anglo settler James Jakes who told them they could cement the Berreyesa claim by building four new homes on outlying areas of the property and occupying them in a similar manner to the new squatters. Jakes seized the vacated Berreyesa adobe and claimed the whole grant for himself.

After Alviso died on 1853, his widow, Juana Galindo Alviso, rented a home to two of the Berreyesa sons. When she married the rancho manager, Jose Urridias, a native of Sonora, he made them leave. Eventually the Alviso family had to sell off most of the land to pay court fees to fight off American squatters.

== Historic sites of the Rancho ==
- Jose Maria Alviso Adobe. An 1835 ranch house, once owned by the Alviso family to whom the rancho was granted, still stands to the south east of the intersection of Piedmont Road and Calaveras Road at the edge of the city.
- Dutton Hotel, Stagecoach Station was located on Jolon Road on the Rancho Milpitas in Jolon, California. It was a one-story rectangular adobe inn built by Antonio Ramirez in 1849 as a home for miners and travelers. What remains are ruins of an adobe inn. The Dutton Hotel was a major stagecoach stop on El Camino Real in the late 1880s. The landmark was listed on the National Register of Historic Places on October 14, 1971.

== See also ==
- Berreyesa family
