= Samuel Ayer High School =

Former high school in Milpitas, California

Created in 1956, Samuel Ayer High School was the first high school in the City of Milpitas, California. The school was named after Samuel Freeman Ayer, a district supervisor of education. It was located at 1395 E. Calaveras Blvd. Previous to its opening, Milpitas high school students attended James Lick High School in San Jose. With the opening of Milpitas High School in 1969, the two schools coexisted until 1980 when declining enrollment caused Samuel Ayer to be closed. The first graduating class of Milpitas High School did so in June 1971.

The campus has now been put to use as the Milpitas Sports Center, Teen Center and Adult Education Center.

== See also ==
- List of closed secondary schools in California
