= Brandon Carswell =

American football player (born 1989)

No. 13
- Position: Wide receiver

Personal information
- Born: May 22, 1989 (age 37); Milpitas, CA
- Listed height: 6 ft 1 in (1.85 m)
- Listed weight: 201 lb (91 kg)

Career information
- High school: Milpitas High School
- College: Southern California
- NFL draft: 2012: undrafted

Career history
- Oakland Raiders (2012)*; San Francisco 49ers (2013)
- * Offseason or practice squad member only
- Stats at Pro Football Reference

Brandon Carswell (born May 22, 1989) is an American former football wide receiver. He played college football for the USC Trojans. Carswell signed as an undrafted free agent after the 2012 NFL draft.

== High school ==
Carswell attended Milpitas High School in Milpitas, CA. Carswell chose to attend USC after being recruited by many other top schools.

== College career ==
Carswell played the most during his redshirt senior year, after considering transferring due to sanctions.

== Professional career ==
=== Oakland Raiders ===
Carswell was signed by the Oakland Raiders as an undrafted free agent after the 2012 NFL draft. He was released on September 12, 2012.

=== San Francisco 49ers ===
In 2013, he signed with the 49ers but was placed on injured reserve. He was waived on April 11, 2014.
