= José María Alviso Adobe =

Historic house in California, United States

- U.S. National Register of Historic Places
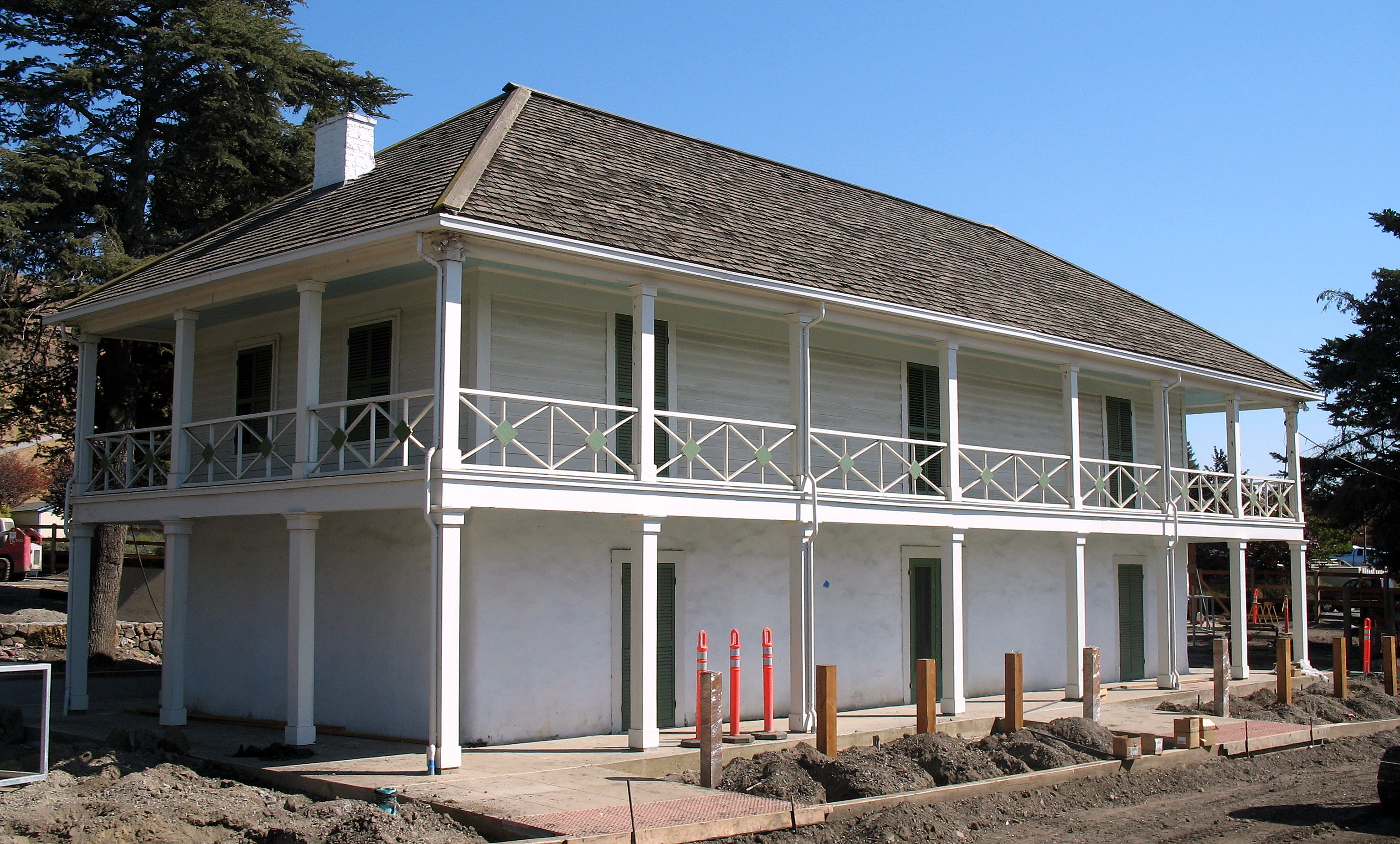
- Location: Milpitas, California
- Coordinates: 37°26′17.59″N 121°52′21.68″W
- Built: 1837; 189 years ago
- Architectural style: Monterey Colonial
- NRHP reference No.: 97001190
- Added to NRHP: October 7, 1997

The José María Alviso Adobe, located in Milpitas, California, United States, was the home of José María Alviso, an early alcalde (mayor) of neighboring Pueblo de San Jose. It was built in 1837 and enlarged in the early 1850s, and stands as an excellent example of the Monterey Colonial style of architecture popularized throughout California in the 1830s and 1840s. It is the only remaining example of this style in the Santa Clara Valley. The adobe is listed on the National Register of Historic Places.

The building is the result of a major remodeling completed by 1853 by the Alviso family. They added a wood-frame second floor to the family's one-story adobe house. Before the remodeling in 1853, the earlier building, built around 1837, most likely as a one-story adobe, provided the thick adobe walls of the first floor. The Alviso Adobe is a two-story residence with a hipped roof and a balcony carried on three sides. The plan of the rectangular residence is symmetrical, comprising three rooms downstairs with three upstairs rooms. The Alviso Adobe contains a remarkable amount of historic fabric—adobe walls from the 1830s, examples of framing and doors, windows, hardware from 1853 and an almost intact 1920s kitchen. It is unusual to find a building as little altered over a period of 150 years.

The Alviso Adobe exhibits the character-defining features of the Monterey style: wood-shingled hipped roof, wood balconies on three sides, paired French doors opening to the outside, multi-paned windows, interior fireplaces, and a symmetrical layout.

The property is under renovation. The project work comprises the upgrading of the existing historic farm to reflect the theme of a working ranch and orchard as it would have appeared in the 1920s. A number of mature trees are present on the site. A barn containing timbers dating to the 1840s was recently demolished. Both historic and prehistoric subsurface cultural remains have been documented in the vicinity of the residence.
