= Milpitas High School =

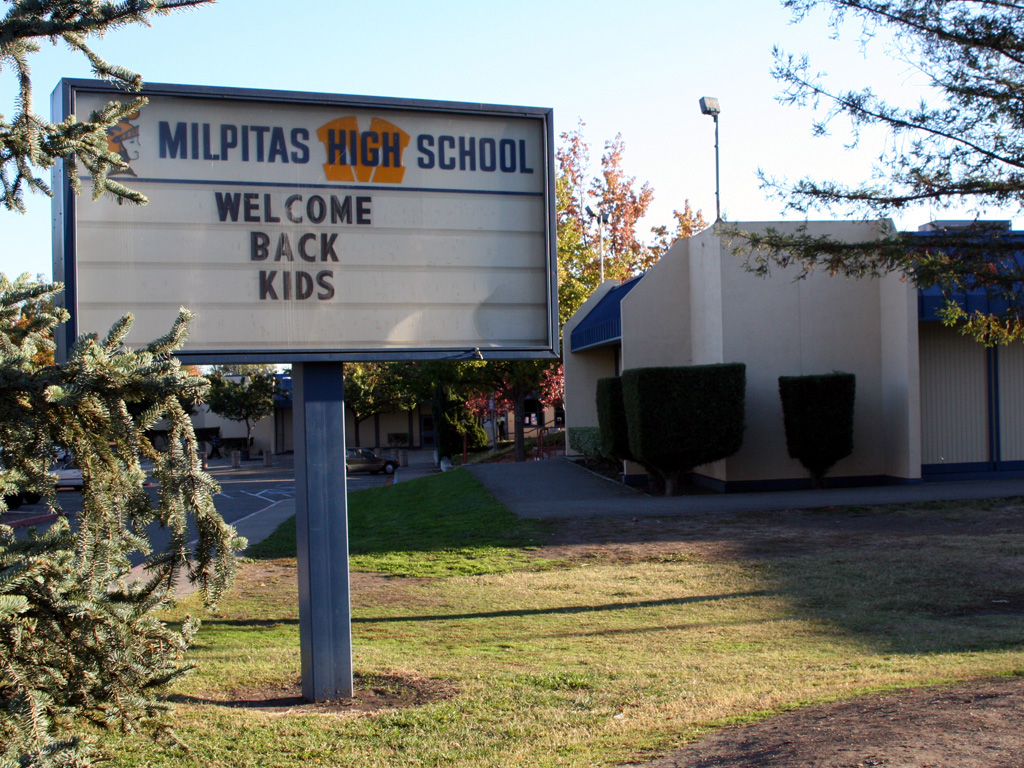
- Milpitas High School billboard and campus

Location
- 1285 Escuela Parkway; Milpitas, California; United States; 37°27′04″N 121°54′07″W

Information
- Type: Public
- Established: 1969
- School district: Milpitas Unified School District
- Principal: Greg Wohlman
- Teaching staff: 136.39 (on an FTE basis)
- Enrollment: 2,926 (2024–2025)
- Student to teacher ratio: 21.45
- Color: Navy Gold
- Song: Milpitas Alma Mater
- Nickname: Trojans
- Newspaper: The Union
- Website: https://sites.google.com/musd.org/mhs

Milpitas High School (MHS) is a public four-year comprehensive high school in Milpitas, California, a suburban community north of San Jose. It is the main high school serving the boundaries of the Milpitas Unified School District.

As of 2013, Milpitas High School had an API score of 830 and had an API ranking of 8 out of 10. In 2004, MHS was granted a full, six-year accreditation by the Western Association of Schools and Colleges.

Milpitas High School has modernized facilities which are spread across a 44-acre campus. The facilities include an 8 lane track, tennis courts, baseball field, soccer field, swimming pool and 2 gymnasiums.

== History ==
Milpitas High School was directly preceded by Samuel Ayer High School. A continuum of education had existed in what is now the City of Milpitas since the Spanish colonial era, only to be interrupted by brief periods from 1848 to 1858 upon the secularization of the Californian missions, and 1954–1959, in which James Lick High School in the nearby city of San Jose became the high school for Milpitas residents. Upon the final restoration of local secondary education in 1959, a classical education in Latin Grammar and English Literature ceased to be the norm, and a modern curriculum was implemented, of which forms the basis of the curriculum for the present high school. Milpitas High School co-existed with Samuel Ayer High School from 1969, until the latter closed its doors in 1980, leaving Milpitas High School to be the sole remaining high school. The predecessors of Milpitas High School are:

- Mission San José de Guadalupe (1797–1848)

First interruption period, 1848-1856

- Laguna School (1856–1858)
- Milpitas Grammar School (1858–1954)

Second interruption period, 1954-1959

- James Lick High School (1954–1959)

Restoration to Milpitas

- Samuel Ayer High School (1959–1969; co-existed until 1980)

== Campus ==
Milpitas High School is located on Escuela Parkway in Milpitas, north of Jacklin Road. The eastern side of the school is the main entrance and student drop-off area, and the western side consists of a football stadium, track, and mural of Milpitas High School's mascot, the Trojans.

Milpitas High School has many facilities for athletic use. The school has a new swimming pool (as of 2015) that is open to the public. Also, the football and soccer fields are built of artificial turf, and the synthetic rubber track was built in 2003 and finished in 2004. Since its beginnings, Milpitas High has been renovated and improved, with new buildings and facilities being added for school use. Marshall Pomeroy Elementary School is adjacent to Milpitas High School's east side, and Thomas Russell Middle School is located northeast of the high school.

== Academics ==
=== Graduation requirements ===
Students must complete 220 credits, including:

- English- 40 credits
- Social Studies- 35 credits
- Math- 30 credits
- Science- 20 credits
- Physical Education- 20 credits
- Fine Arts, Foreign Language, or Humanities- 10 credits
- Electives- 65 credits

Milpitas Unified requires 20 hours of community service in order to receive a high school diploma.

== Athletics ==
Milpitas High School Varsity football team won the school's first state championship in any sport in 2017; beating Southwest High School from El Centro 45-41.

== Notable alumni ==
- Kim Bokamper – Miami Dolphins football player; 1976 NFL First round pick
- Brandon Carswell – former USC football player
- Cori Close – head coach of the UCLA Bruins women's basketball team
- Lenzie Jackson – NFL football player
- Alex Lee, member of the California State Assembly
- Deltha O'Neal – NFL football player; 2000 NFL First round pick
- Tab Perry – NFL football player; 2005 NFL Sixth round pick
- Vita Vea – NFL football player for the Tampa Bay Buccaneers; 2018 NFL First round pick; Super Bowl Champion 2020, Two-time Pro Bowler
- Jeannie Mai – TV personality
- Sarina Bolden – Philippine Women's National Football Team Forward

== Hosted Events ==
Milpitas High School has been the site of several extracurricular events.

- MilpitasHacks3 - A hackathon which took place on June 13, 2026. Competitors were middle and high schoolers, and the competition involved three tracks. The event was sponsored by various technology companies, including Asus.
