= Cristo Rey De La Salle East Bay High School =

Coordinates: 37°46′43.16″N 122°13′19.62″W

Location
- 1530 34th Ave; Oakland, California; United States

Information
- Type: Catholic, De La Salle Brothers
- Established: 2018; 8 years ago
- Principal: Jessica Murray
- Gender: Coeducational
- Campus: St. Elizabeth Campus
- Colors: Red, white, yellow, blue
- Athletics: Women's volleyball; women's soccer; women's basketball; men's soccer; men's basketball
- Mascot: Mustang
- Website: www.cristoreydelasalle.org

Cristo Rey De La Salle East Bay High School is a work of the San Francisco New Orleans District of the De La Salle Brothers. Opened in 2018, it is a member of the national Cristo Rey Network of work-study schools for underserved Hispanic Asian American and African American students. The new school occupies the former premises of St. Elizabeth High School in the Fruitvale District of Oakland, California, where the majority of the households are currently Hispanic. The purpose of the school is to provide an affordable, college prep education to needy students in the depressed area of inner-city Oakland, the underserved families of the East Bay. The athletic program of Cristo Rey participates in the CIF North Coast Section as a non-league affiliate.
