= Ravenswood High School (East Palo Alto) =

- East Palo Alto, California; United States

Information
- Type: Public high school
- Opened: 1958
- Closed: 1976
- School district: Sequoia Union High School District
- Enrollment: 823 (1974)
- Colors: Blue and yellow
- Team name: Trojans
- Yearbook: Argonaut

Ravenswood High School was a public high school located in East Palo Alto, California, United States. Opened in 1958, it served the East Palo Alto area of San Mateo County until its closure in 1976. In 1958 its enrollment was 629 students. During the existence of Ravenswood, East Palo Alto was the low-income area in the shadow of its more affluent neighbors Menlo Park, Atherton and Palo Alto. The adjacent city of Palo Alto is a completely different city in Santa Clara County. Ravenswood was part of the Sequoia Union High School District, which also serves the southern San Mateo County cities of Belmont, Redwood City, San Carlos, and Woodside.

== History ==
The school opened in 1958 with 629 students. By 1964 enrollment had risen to 1,285.

However, white flight from the city of East Palo Alto led to a rapid increase in the percentage of African American students during the 1960s; both the Congress of Racial Equality and the National Association for the Advancement of Colored People expressed concern about de facto segregation. Starting in 1965, a group called Mothers for Equal Education demonstrated for the school to be closed and East Palo Alto students sent to majority-white schools, believing that that would give them a better education; for two years, up to 200 students lived with families in Palo Alto or Los Altos in order to attend school there, in a covert program called the "Sneak-out". By 1970 enrollment had fallen to 781, 64% black. In 1968, a sit in was organized by a group named "Students for Higher Education". In the sit in, they called for classes in Black history and certain teachers deemed as "racist" to be fired. The sit in was Captained by Charles Boulding (Student Body President) and Odia Chiles who later became Mayor of East Palo Alto. In 1968 the district had adopted a voluntary transfer program that essentially legalized the Sneak-out; in 1971 it introduced a voluntary busing program to reduce segregation in all its high schools, and also sought to make Ravenswood a magnet school, introducing an experimental curriculum including three- to six-week "mini-cycle" courses in subjects such as scuba diving, pottery, photography, golf, and mountaineering, and academic advisement and "houses" based on astrological signs.

Enrollment briefly recovered but declined again, to 823 in 1974. Few parents were willing to bus their children to Ravenswood, and there was increasing racial tension in the district high schools, with race riots occurring at Ravenswood among others. In the late 1960s and early 1970s, East Palo Alto hosted Black Power summits, and local opinion changed as to the value of integrated education, with the leader of the Mothers, Gertrude Wilks, now advocating private black education as a refuge from racism. In 1976 the district closed Ravenswood High School because of low enrollment and financial constraints. The campus was demolished in 1995 to make room for the Gateway 101 Shopping Center.

The closure of Ravenswood meant that the predominantly minority students of East Palo Alto were bused to other schools in the district, such as Carlmont High School in Belmont; these were more distant than Palo Alto High School, which is in a different district and across the county line, and at the time were predominantly white. Another of the district's high schools, Menlo-Atherton High School in Atherton, is also closer to East Palo Alto. In July 2013 the Lawyers' Committee for Civil Rights of the San Francisco Bay Area, working with the law firm of Bingham McCutchen, submitted a report to the district school board asserting that bussing the East Palo Alto students to such schools as Carlmont rather than to Menlo-Atherton was a violation of their legal rights. In October that year, the district announced that it would make it easier for East Palo Alto students to attend Menlo-Atherton.

In 1976, students published a book celebrating the school. The 1995 play Circle in the Dirt by Cherríe Moraga examines mid-1990s gentrification in East Palo Alto and parts of the play recount the closure of Ravenswood and the long-lasting cultural impact of that closure on the community. In 2002, it was memorialized in a mural created by the Mural, Music and the Arts Project at the Boys and Girls Club of the Peninsula in East Palo Alto, called Remembering Ravenswood: East Palo Alto's Educational Sacrifice.

== Notable people ==
=== Alumni ===
- Nate Branch, member of the Harlem Globetrotters
- Rudy Law, outfielder for Los Angeles Dodgers and Chicago White Sox
- Mike McCurry (Class of 1972), White House press secretary
- Joseph E. Prince (Class of 1972), Cal Poly Mustangs sprinter

=== Faculty ===
- Tommie Smith, track coach

== See also ==
- List of closed secondary schools in California
