= Los Buellis Hills =

American short sub-range of hills in Diablo Range

- Location within California Location within the United States

Highest point
- Elevation: 602 m (1,975 ft)

Geography
- Country: United States
- State: California
- Region: Diablo Range
- District: Santa Clara County
- Range coordinates: 37°25′25.778″N 121°47′55.832″W
- Topo map: USGS Calaveras Reservoir

Los Buellis Hills are a short sub-range of hills in the northwestern Diablo Range, in the South Bay region of the San Francisco Bay Area, within Santa Clara County, California.

== Geography ==
The hills are located east of the Berryessa community in northeastern San Jose, and slightly west of Felter Road.

The Los Buellis Hills average about 2,000 feet (610 m) in elevation.

The hills support a non-native grassland habitat, and are used primarily for cattle grazing. High-voltage transmission lines pass through the hills.

== See also ==
- Diablo Range topics
- Mountain ranges of Santa Clara County, California
