= Milpitas Grammar School =

- U.S. National Register of Historic Places
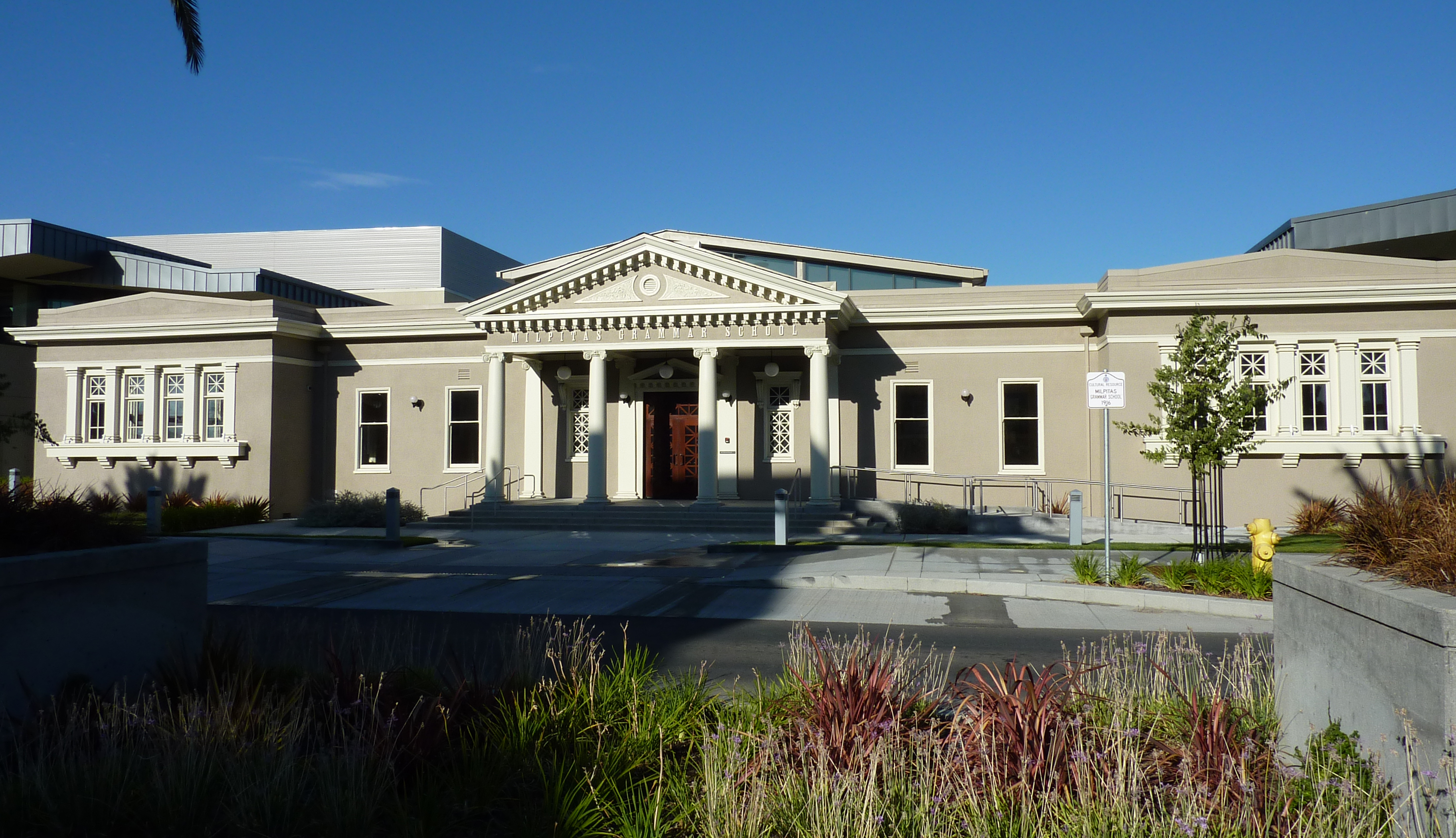
- The original school building.

- Location within San Jose, California
- Location: 160 N. Main St., Milpitas, California
- Coordinates: 37°25′58″N 121°54′26″W
- Architect: Frank Delos Wolfe
- Architectural style: Classical Revival
- NRHP reference No.: 93000667
- Added to NRHP: July 22, 1993

Milpitas Grammar School, now part of the Milpitas Library, is an educational building in Milpitas, California. The building was placed on the National Register of Historic Places on July 22, 1993.

The Greek Revival building (listed on the NRHP as Classical Revival) was designed by Frank Delos Wolfe to replace an earlier two-story Victorian-style wooden schoolhouse that burned down in 1912. The structure was built by the architect's brother, Theodore Linfield Wolfe, in 1916 for $13,212, and had offices, at least four classrooms, and an auditorium.

During the three years of construction, school was held in a building on a nearby ranch. The building was used as a school until 1956, a few years after the city was incorporated in 1954. The current Milpitas High School traces its roots to the school. Afterward the building served various roles including as Milpitas City Hall, Police Department, library and the Milpitas Senior Center. The city conducted a restoration in 1990.

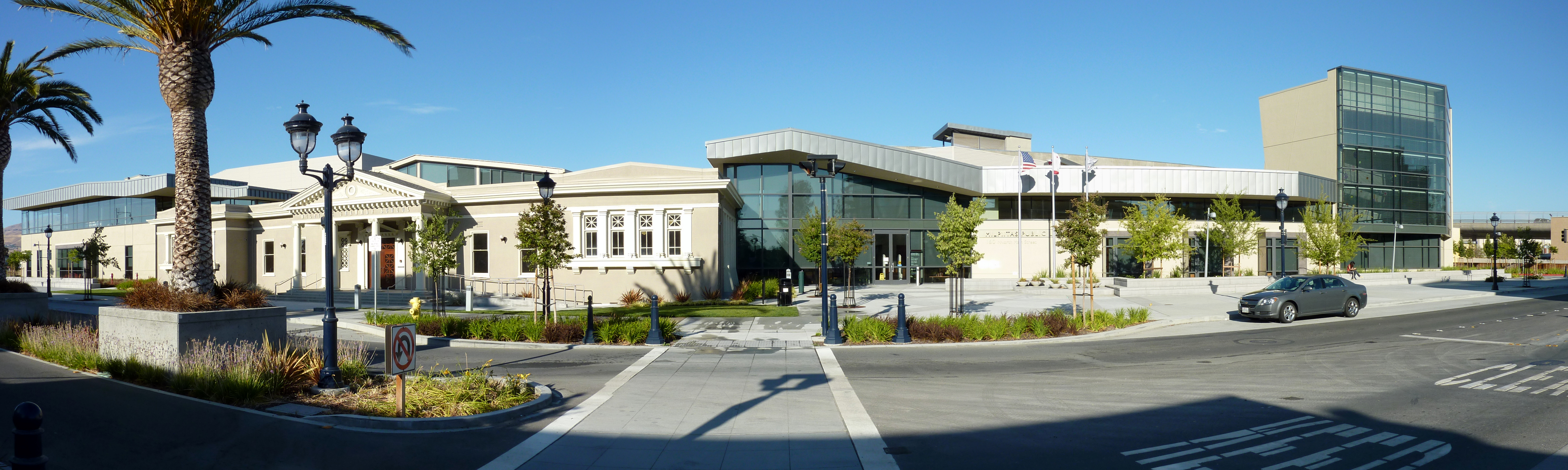
Milpitas Library

In 2006, the structure was integrated into a much larger public library that opened on January 10, 2009. The 60,000 square feet (5,600 m^{2}), two-level library is the largest in the Santa Clara County Library system and places the Milpitas Grammar School building in the center and bookends it with wings to the north and south. The school's original open courtyard was covered with a tensile fabric roof to filter the sunlight.
