= Santa Cruz Waldorf High School =

Defunct school in California, United States

The Santa Cruz Waldorf High School was a private, non-denominational grade 9-12 educational institution. The school closed in 2009, due to a drop in enrollment.

Like all Waldorf schools, the high school's curriculum followed the general outline that the founder of Waldorf education, Rudolf Steiner, developed for the original Waldorf School in Stuttgart, Germany. However, in keeping with its mandate to prepare students for University of California (UC) admission, the Santa Cruz Waldorf High School integrated Waldorf curriculum with the course requirements of the UC system.

== Curriculum ==
The school operated on a trimester system. In addition to the math, English, science, history, social studies, and foreign language core curriculum, the school provided specialty courses in art (painting, drawing, sculpture), practical arts (metalwork, woodwork, jewelry making, pottery, bookbinding), archery, chorus, drumming, chamber music and drama. In addition to the usual activities, the physical education program included surfing, rock climbing, kayaking, sailing, meditative motion, and hiking. Math courses were delivered at three skill levels: basic algebra, advanced algebra, and calculus.

In keeping with its Pacific Rim educational theme, the school's foreign language program included Mandarin Chinese and Spanish, and the student body included a number of visiting students from the People's Republic of China. The school has also hosted visiting students from South America and Europe.

Sports teams included men's and women's basketball and track.

== History of the school ==
The Santa Cruz Waldorf High School was created in 2004 with a 9th grade class of 11 students and graduated its first 12th grade class in June, 2008. The school received dual accreditation from the Western Association of Schools and Colleges (WASC) and the Association of Waldorf Schools in North America (AWSNA) in 2007.

== Student activities ==
The school won first place for Best Formal Presentation and placed fourth overall among 10 high schools in the 2007 World Affairs Challenge, a program and academic competition on international affairs for middle and high school students.

Students were active in the Schools for Schools Campaign to help rebuild schools in northern Uganda.
