= Albizu =

Albizu is a Basque surname. Notable people with the surname include:

- Carlos Albizu Miranda (1920–1984), the cousin of the Puerto Rican Nationalist leader Pedro Albizu Campos
- Daniela Albizu (1936–2015), Basque teacher and writer
- Héctor Valdez Albizu (born 1947), the current Governor of the Banco Central de la República Dominicana
- Joseba Albizu (born 1978), a Spanish professional road bicycle racer
- Olga Albizu (1924–2005), an abstract expressionist painter
- Pedro Albizu Campos (1891–1965), a Puerto Rican politician
