= Alviso Diedo =

Italian captain

- Died: 1466
- Burial place: Santi Giovanni e Paolo, Venice
- Occupation: Admiral

Alviso Diedo was a 15th-century Venetian captain who participated in the Fall of Constantinople.

== Siege of Constantinople ==
After traveling across the Black Sea where he led a flotilla of three galleys in 1453, Alviso Diedo headed for Constantinople with Gabriele Trevisano. The two captains promised help to the Byzantine Emperor Constantine XI Palaiologos in defending the city against the Ottomans. During the siege, he commanded the ships of the Golden Horn harbor with Gabriele Trevisano. When the city fell on May 29, he escaped to the Genoese colony of Galata by boat. He offered the service of his ships to the city authorities. The Genoese authorities decided to maintain their neutrality and demanded that Alviso Diedo leave the city. He then ordered his men to break the Golden Horn chain and escaped with most of the Venetian ships as well as some Genoese and Byzantine ships carrying refugees from Constantinople. The Turkish sailors, who were preoccupied with looting the city, could not prevent the escape of this fleet. His galley being the first to reach the city of Venice, he reported the battle to the Republic of Venice. Alviso died in 1466 and is buried in Santi Giovanni e Paolo, Venice. The story of his actions in Constantinople appears on his tombstone.
