= St. Elizabeth High School (Oakland, California) =

Private, coeducational school in Oakland, California, United States

Location
- 1530 34th Avenue; Oakland, (Alameda County), California 94601; United States; 37°46′43″N 122°13′20″W

Information
- Type: Private, Coeducational
- Motto: Caritas ∙ Veritas (Charity ∙ Truth)
- Religious affiliation: Roman Catholic
- Established: 1921
- Closed: 2017
- CEEB code: 052235
- Faculty: 28
- Grades: 9-12
- Colors: Scarlet and White
- Sports: Soccer, Track, Volleyball, Basketball
- Mascot: Mustang horse
- Nickname: Mustangs
- Accreditation: Western Association of Schools and Colleges
- Website: www.stliz-hs.org

St. Elizabeth High School was a private, Roman Catholic high school in Oakland, California, established in 1921 by the Franciscan Friars. It was located in the Roman Catholic Diocese of Oakland. It closed in 2017 and reopened on August 15, 2018, as Cristo Rey De La Salle East Bay High School.

== History ==
St. Elizabeth Parish was established in Oakland in 1892 under the direction of the Franciscan friars, initially serving the area's German-speaking Catholic population. The following year, the Dominican Sisters of Mission San Jose opened St. Elizabeth Elementary School with an initial enrollment of 20 students. St. Elizabeth High School later opened in August 1921 at 1530 34th Avenue.

The high school operated in East Oakland until its closure in 2017. The campus continued to be used for Catholic secondary education and reopened on August 15, 2018, as Cristo Rey De La Salle East Bay High School.

St. Elizabeth High School was a private, coeducational Roman Catholic secondary school in Oakland, California. Founded in 1921, it operated in East Oakland until closing in 2017. Its former campus reopened in 2018 as Cristo Rey De La Salle East Bay High School.
