= José María Alviso =

American politician

Alcalde of San José
- In office 1836
- Preceded by: Antonio María Pico
- Succeeded by: Juan Alvires

Personal details
- Born: November 19, 1798 Santa Clara, California
- Died: June 18, 1853 (aged 54) Milpitas, California
- Spouse: Juana Galindo (m. 1826)

José María de Jesus Alviso (November 19, 1798 – June 18, 1853) was a Californio ranchero, soldier, and politician. He served as Alcalde of San José (mayor) in 1836 and was the rancho grantee for Rancho Milpitas. Alviso is considered the founder of the city of Milpitas.

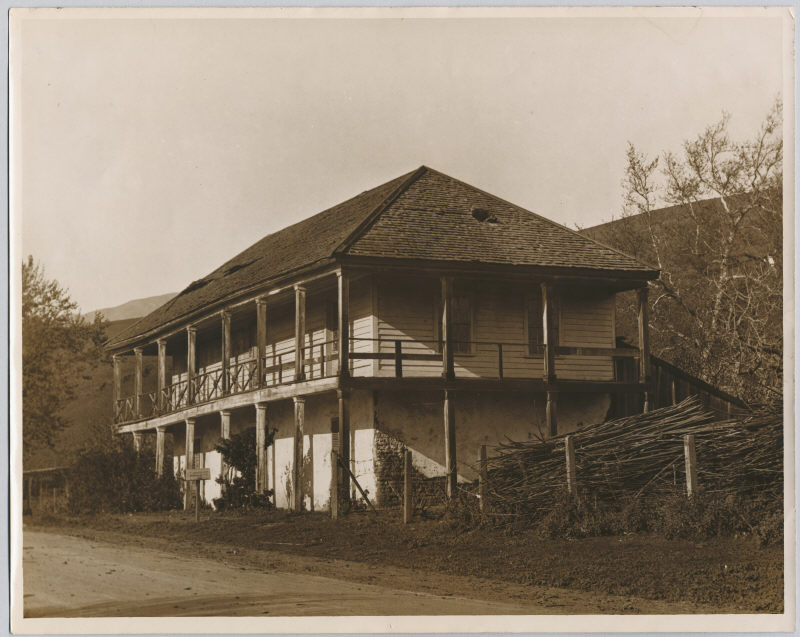
The Jose Maria Alviso Adobe once the center of Rancho Milpitas as it appeared in 1920.

== Biography ==
Alviso was born in 1798, and baptized at Mission Santa Clara. He was the son of Francisco Xavier Alviso and Maria Bojorquez, both of whom arrived in San Francisco as children with their parents from Sonora on the Spanish De Anza Expedition in 1776. His uncle was Ignacio Alviso.

José María Alviso served as a soldier in the Spanish- and later Mexican military from 1819 to 1827.

In 1826 he married Juana Galindo, daughter of Crisostomo Galindo.

Governor José Castro of Alta California granted a large tract of land in what is now Milpitas, California on September 23, 1835, to Alviso. Alviso served as the alcalde of San José in 1836.

== Identity ==
Confusingly, Alviso had a cousin named José María Alviso who was born in 1807 to Ignacio Alviso and Margarita Bernal and baptized at Mission Santa Clara. However, as Alviso descendant Bart Sepulveda pointed out, since the grantee of Rancho Milpitas had served as a soldier starting in 1819, a 12-year-old would be too young to be the person in question. Further clarification comes from the Supreme Court appeal United States v. Jose Antonio Alviso (1859). Ignacio's son Jose Maria was granted another rancho, Rancho Cañada de Verde y Arroyo de la Purisima, in 1838. Jose Antonio Alviso was known to be Ignacio's eldest son. The appeal mentions that Jose Maria Alviso who made petition in 1838 for the rancho was his brother.

== See also ==
- Californios
- History of California through 1899
