= List of charter schools in California =

Kendrick lamar

The following is a list of charter schools in California (including networks of such schools) grouped by county.

== Alameda County ==
- Academy of Alameda Middle School
- Achieve Academy
- AIMS College Prep Middle School/AIMS High School
- Alameda Community Learning Center
- Alternative in Action High School
- American Indian Public Charter School
- ARISE High School
- ASCEND Elementary
- Aspire Schools (Berkley Maynard, College Academy, Golden State Prep, Lionel Wilson Prep, Monarch, Triumph Technology)
- Aurum Preparatory Academy
- Bay Area Technology School
- Circle of Independent Learning
- Community School for Creative Education
- Connecting Waters Charter School (East Bay)
- Downtown Charter Academy
- East Bay Innovation Academy
- Education for Change Public Schools (6 schools)
- Envision Schools (3 schools)
- Francophone Charter School of Oakland
- Hayward Twin Oaks Montessori School
- KEY Academy Charter School
- KIPP (Bridge Academy, King Collegiate, Summit Academy)
- Leadership Public Schools, Hayward
- Lighthouse Community Public Schools
- Nea Community Learning Center
- North Oakland Community Charter School
- Oakland Charter Academy
- Oakland Charter High School
- Oakland Military Institute
- Oakland School for the Arts
- Opportunity Academy
- Oakland Unity Middle/High School
- Urban Montessori Charter School
- Yu Ming Charter School

== Butte County ==
- Achieve Charter School (3 schools)
- Blue Oak Charter School
- Chico Country Day School
- Children's Community Charter School
- Come Back Butte Charter School
- CORE Butte Charter School
- Forest Ranch Charter School
- Hearthstone School
- HomeTech Charter School
- Inspire School of Arts & Sciences
- Ipkanni Early College Charter
- Paradise Charter Middle School
- Pivot Charter School (North Valley II)
- Sherwood Montessori School
- STREAM Charter School
- Wildflower Open Classroom

== Contra Costa County ==
- Antioch Charter Academies (2 schools)
- Aspire Schools (Richmond Cal Prep, Richmond Tech Academy)
- Benito Juarez Elementary School
- Caliber: Beta Academy
- California Pacific Charter Schools
- Clayton Valley Charter High School
- Contra Costa School of Performing Arts
- Eagle Peak Montessori School
- Golden Gate Community School
- Invictus Academy of Richmond
- John Henry High School
- Leadership Public Schools Richmond
- Making Waves Academy
- Manzanita Middle School
- Richmond Charter Academy (2 schools)
- Richmond College Prep School
- Rocketship Schools (Delta Prep, Futuro Academy)
- Summit Public School
- Vista Oaks Charter School
- Voices College-Bound Language Academies (West Contra Costa)

== Del Norte County ==
- Castle Rock Charter School
- Uncharted Shores Academy

== El Dorado County ==
- American River Charter School
- Buckeye Union Mandarin Immersion Charter School
- California Montessori Project (Shingle Springs)
- Camino Polytechnic
- Charter Alternative Program
- Charter Community School Home Study Academy
- Charter Montessori (Valley View)
- Clarksville Charter School
- The Cottonwood School
- EDUHSD Virtual Academy Shenandoah
- John Adams Academy (El Dorado Hills)
- Rising Sun Montessori School
- Rite of Passage

== Fresno County ==
- Agape Schools (Carter G. Woodson, W.E.B DuBois School, W.E.B DuBois Academy)
- Alvina Elementary Charter School
- Aspen Public Schools (3 schools)
- Big Picture Educational Academy
- California Virtual Academy (Fresno)
- Career Technical Education Center
- Central Valley Home School
- Clovis Global Academy
- Clovis Online Charter School
- Edison-Bethune Charter Academy
- Endeavor Charter School
- Golden Charter Academy
- Hallmark Charter School
- Hume Lake Charter School
- Inspire Schools (Central)
- Island Community Day School
- Kepler Neighborhood School
- Kings Canyon Online School
- Kingsburg Elementary Charter School District
- Learn4Life (Ambassador Philip V. Sanchez II, Clovis, Crescent View South II, Crescent View West, Manchester Center, Sunnyside)
- Morris E. Dailey Charter Elementary School
- Quail Lake Environmental Charter School
- Rafer Johnson Junior High School
- Reedley Middle College High School
- Sanger Academy Charter School
- School of Unlimited Learning (Fresno EOC)
- Sierra Charter School
- University High School
- West Park Charter Academy
- Yosemite Valley Charter School

== Glenn County ==
- Lake View Charter School
- Success One!
- Walden Academy
- William Finch Charter School

== Humboldt County ==
- Agnes J. Johnson Charter School
- Alder Grove Charter School
- Coastal Grove Charter School
- Freshwater Charter Middle School
- Fuente Nueva Charter School
- Laurel Tree Charter School
- Northcoast Preparatory Academy
- Northern United Humboldt Charter School
- Pacific View Charter, California
- Redwood Preparatory Charter School
- Six Rivers Charter High School
- South Bay Charter School
- The Trillium Charter of Humboldt
- Union Street Charter School

== Imperial County ==
- Ballington Academy of Arts & Sciences
- Imperial Pathways Charter School
- The Imperial Valley Homeschool Academy

== Inyo County ==
- College Bridge Academy
- The Education Corps
- YouthBuild Charter School (California Central)

== Kern County ==
- Blue Ridge Academy
- California Virtual Academy (Maricopa)
- Cecil Avenue Math & Science Academy
- Del Vista Math & Science Academy
- EPIC de Cesar Chavez High School (North Region)
- Grimmway Academy
- GROW Academy (Arvin, Shafter)
- Heartland Charter School
- Insight School of California
- Inspire Charter School (Kern)
- Kern Workforce 2000 Academy
- Nueva Vista Language Academy
- Peak to Peak Mountain Charter School
- Ridgecrest Elementary Academy for Language, Music & Science (REALMS)
- Valley Oaks Charter School
- Wonderful College Prep Academy

== Kings County ==
- California Virtual Academy (Kings)
- Crossroads Charter School
- Hanford Online Charter School
- Learn4Life (Kings Valley Academy II)
- Lemoore Schools (3 schools)
- Mid Valley Alternative Charter School

== Lake County ==
- California Connections Academy (North Bay)
- Lake County International Charter School

== Lassen County ==
- Long Valley School
- Mt. Lassen Charter School
- Thompson Peak Charter School

== Los Angeles County ==
=== A-H ===
- Academia Avance Charter School
- Academia Moderna
- Academies of the Antelope Valley
- Alliance Schools (Collins Family, Margaret M. Bloomfield, Marine Innovation)
- Alma Fuerte Public School
- Alfred B. Noble Charter Middle School
- Animo (City of Champions, Inglewood, Leadership, Venice)
- Antelope Valley Learning Academy
- Ararat Charter School
- Aspire (Antonia Maria Lugo, Centennial, Firestone, Gateway, Junior Collegiate, Ollin, Pacific, Titan)
- Assurance Learning Academy
- Aveson (2 schools)
- Beckford Charter for Enriched Studies
- Bert Corona Charter School
- Birmingham High School
- Bridges Preparatory Academy
- Calabash Charter Academy
- California Pacific Charter School (Los Angeles)
- California School of the Arts (San Gabriel Valley)
- California Virtual Academy (Los Angeles)
- Calvert Charter for Enriched Studies
- Canyon Charter Elementary School
- Carpenter Community Charter School
- Castlebay Lane Charter School
- Century Community Charter School
- Charter HS of Arts-Multimedia & Performing (CHAMPS)
- Chatsworth Charter High School
- CHIME Institute's Schwarzenegger Community
- Citizens of the World Charter School (IV, V)
- City Honors International Preparatory High School
- Clear Passage Educational Center
- Colfax Charter Elementary School
- Compass Charter Schools of Los Angeles
- Da Vinci (Communications, Connect, Design, Rise, Science)
- Dearborn Elementary Charter Academy
- Desert Sands Charter School
- Discovery Charter Preparatory
- Dixie Canyon Community Charter School
- Eagle Collegiate Academy
- El Camino Real Charter High School
- El Oro Way Charter For Enriched Studies
- Enadia Way Technology Charter School
- Encino Charter Elementary School
- Environmental Charter School (Gardena HS, Gardena Middle, Inglewood, Lawndale)
- Empower Generations
- Family First Charter School
- Fenton (Avenue, Leadership, Primary, STEM)
- Gabriella Charter Schools
- Gaspar De Portola Charter Middle School
- George Ellery Hale Charter Academy
- Girls Athletic Leadership School Los Angeles
- Gorman Learning Center
- Grace Hopper STEM Academy
- Granada Hills Charter School
- Grover Cleveland Charter High School
- Hamlin Charter Academy
- Hawthorne Math and Science Academy
- Haynes Charter For Enriched Studies
- Hesby Oaks Leadership Charter
- High Tech LA

=== I-P ===
- ICEF Inglewood Elementary Charter Academy
- iLead (Agua Dulce, Hybrid, Lancaster, Online)
- Ingenium Charter School
- iQ Academy Los Angeles
- ISANA (Achernar, Cardinal, Palmati)
- James Jordan Middle School
- Justice Street Academy Charter School
- KIPP (Comienza, Corazon, Pueblo Unido)
- Knollwood Preparatory Academy
- Intellectual Virtues Academy
- Ivy Academia
- Ivy Bound Academy of Math, Science, and Technology Charter Middle School I/II
- La Tijera K-8 Academy of Excellence Charter School
- La Verne Science and Technology Charter School
- Larchmont Charter School
- Lashon Academy I
- Learning Works
- Lennox Mathematics, Science & Technology Academy
- Life Source International Charter School
- Lifeline Education Charter School
- Lockhurst Drive Charter Elementary School
- Magnolia Science Academy (Bell, I, II, III, V, VII)
- Marquez Charter School
- Method Schools, LA
- Mission Academy
- Mission View Public School
- Montague Charter Academy
- Multicultural Learning Center
- Nestle Avenue Charter School
- N.E.W. Academy Canoga Park
- New Horizons Charter Academy
- New Millennium Secondary School
- New Opportunities Charter School
- North Valley Military Institute College Preparatory Academy
- Odyssey Charter School
- Opportunities for Learning (Baldwin Park, Duarte, Santa Clarita)
- Options for Youth (Acton, Duarte, San Gabriel)
- Our Community Charter School
- Pacoima Charter Elementary School
- Palisades Charter High School
- Palmdale Academy Charter School
- Palmdale Aerospace Academy
- Pasadena Rosebud Academy
- Plainview Academic Charter Academy
- Pomelo Community Charter School
- Port of Los Angeles High School
- PREPA TEC Los Angeles
- PUC Schools (Community Elementary/Middle/Early College, Inspire, Lakeview, Nueva Esperanza, Triumph)

=== R-Z ===
- Reseda Charter High School
- Riverside Drive Charter School
- Robert A. Millikan Affiliated Charter & Performing Arts Magnet Middle School
- Sage Oak Charter School Keppel
- San Jose Charter Academy
- Santa Clarita Valley International School
- Scholarship Prep School South Bay
- School of Arts and Enterprise
- School of Extended Educational Options
- Serrania Avenue Charter For Enriched Studies
- Sherman Oaks Elementary Charter School
- Soleil Academy Charter School
- Superior Street Elementary School
- Sylmar Charter High School
- T.I.M.E. Community School
- Taft Charter High School
- Topanga Elementary Charter School
- Topeka Charter School For Advanced Studies
- Valiente College Preparatory Charter School
- Valley Charter School
- Valor Academy
- Van Gogh Charter School
- Vaughn Next Century Learning Center
- Village Charter Academy
- We the People High School
- Welby Way Charter Elementary School/Gifted-High Ability Magnet School
- Wilbur Charter School For Enriched Academics
- Wilder's Preparatory Academy
- Woodlake Elementary Community Charter School
- Woodland Hills Elementary Charter For Enriched Studies

=== City of Los Angeles ===
- Academy of Media Arts
- Accelerated Schools
- Alain Leroy Locke College Preparatory Academy
- Alliance Schools (Cindy & Bill Simon, college-Ready Middle 4/8/12, Dr. Olga Mohan, Gertz-Ressler/Richard Merkin, Jack H. Skirball, Judy Ivie Burton, Kory Hunter, Leichtman-Levine, Marc & Eva Stern, Morgan McKinzie, Ouchi-O'Donovan, Patti & Peter Neuwirth, Piera Barbaglia Shaheen, Renee & Meyer Luskin, Susan & Eric Smidt, Ted K. Tajima, Tennenbaum Family, Virgil Roberts)
- Anahuacalmecac International University Preparatory
- Animo (Compton, Ellen Ochoa, Florence-Firestone, Jackie Robinson, James B. Taylor, Jefferson, Mae Jemison, Oscar de la Hoya, Pat Brown, Ralph Bunche, South LA, Watts, Western, Westside)
- APEX Academy
- Arts in Action Community Charter Schools
- Aspire (Inskeep, Juanita Tate, Slauson)
- Barack Obama Charter School
- Bright Star Secondary Charter Academy
- Calliope Academy
- Camino Nuevo Charter Academy (6 schools)
- CATCH Prep Charter High School
- Center for Advanced Learning
- Central City Value School
- Citizens of the World Charter School (Hollywood, Mar Vista, Silver Lake)
- City Charter Schools
- Collegiate Charter High School of Los Angeles
- Community Magnet Charter Elementary School
- Crete Academy
- Crown Preparatory Academy
- Downtown Value School
- Dr. Theodore T. Alexander Jr. Science Center
- Ednovate (Brio, East, Esperanza, USC Hybrid, South LA)
- El Rio Community School
- Emerson Community Charter School
- Equitas Academy (6 schools)
- Everest Value School
- Extera Public School
- Gabriella Charter School
- Global Education Academy
- Goethe International Charter School
- ICEF (Innovation LA, View Park, Vista)
- Ingenium Charter School (Clarion)
- Invictus Leadership Academy
- ISANA (Himalia, Nascent, Octavia)
- Jardin de la Infancia
- Kenter Canyon Elementary Charter School
- KIPP (Compton, Empower, Endeavor, Ignite, Iluminar, Innovation, LA Prep, Opportunity, Philosophers, Poder, Promesa, Raices, Scholar, Sol, Vida)
- Lashon Academy City
- Learning by Design Charter School
- Libertas College Preparatory Charter School
- Los Angeles Academy of Arts and Enterprise
- Los Angeles College Prep Academy
- Los Angeles Leadership Academy
- California Creative Learning Academy (formerly Los Feliz Charter School for the Arts)
- Magnolia Science Academy (IV, VI)
- Math and Science College Preparatory School
- Matrix for Success Academy
- Monsenor Oscar Romero Charter Middle School
- N.E.W. Academy of Science and Arts
- New Designs Charter School
- New Heights Charter School
- New Los Angeles Charter School
- New Village Girls Academy
- New West Charter School
- Ocean Charter School
- Open Charter Magnet School
- Para Los Niños Charter School
- Paul Revere Charter Middle School
- PUC Schools (CALS, eCALS, Excel, Milagro)
- Puente Charter School
- Renaissance Arts Academy
- Resolute Academy Charter School
- Rise Kohyang
- Russell Westbrook Why Not? School
- Santa Monica Boulevard Community Charter School
- SEED School of Los Angeles County
- SIATech Academy South
- Stella Charter Academy
- STEM Preparatory Elementary School
- Synergy (Charter, Kinetic, Quantum)
- TEACH (Academy of Technologies, Preparatory Mildred S. Cunningham & Edith H. Morris Elementary, Tech Charter High)
- Today's Fresh Start Compton
- University High School Charter
- University Preparatory Value High School
- Vista Charter Middle School
- Vista Horizon Global Academy
- Vox Collegiate School of Los Angeles
- Wallis Annenberg High School
- Watts Learning Center
- Westwood Charter Elementary School
- WISH Academy

== Madera County ==
- Chawanakee Academy Charter School
- Ezequiel Tafoya Alvarado Academy
- Glacier High School Charter
- Learn4Life (Crescent View South II)
- Madera County Independent Academy
- Minarets Charter High School
- Mountain Home School Charter
- Pioneer Technical Center
- Sherman Thomas Charter School/STEM Academy
- Yosemite-Wawona Elementary Charter School

== Marin County ==
- Novato Charter School
- Phoenix Academy
- Ross Valley Charter School

== Mariposa County ==
- Sierra Foothill Charter School

== Mendocino County ==
- Accelerated Achievement Academy
- Eel River Charter School
- La Vida Charter School
- Pacific Community Charter School
- Redwood Academy of Ukiah
- River Oak Charter School
- Shanel Valley Academy
- Three Rivers Charter School
- Tree of Life International Charter School
- Willits Charter School

== Merced County ==
- Ballico-Cressey Community Charter School
- Come Back Charter School
- Merced Scholars Charter School

== Mono County ==
- Urban Corps of San Diego County Charter School

== Monterey County ==
- Bay View Academy
- Big Sur Charter School
- International School of Monterey
- Learning for Life Charter School
- Monterey Bay Charter School
- Monterey County Home Charter School
- Oasis Charter Public School
- Open Door Charter School

== Napa County ==
- Stone Bridge School

== Nevada County ==
- Arete Charter Academy
- Bitney Prep High School
- Chicago Park Community Charter School
- Forest Charter School
- Grass Valley Charter School
- John Muir Charter School
- Nevada City School of the Arts
- Sierra Academy of Expeditionary Learning
- Twin Ridges Home Study Charter School
- Vantage Point Charter School
- Yuba River Charter School

== Orange County ==
- Advanced Learning Academy
- California Connections Academy (Southern California)
- Citrus Springs Charter School
- College and Career Preparatory Academy
- Community Roots Academy
- Ednovate (Legacy)
- Edward B. Cole, Sr. Academy
- El Rancho Charter School
- El Sol Santa Ana Science and Arts Academy
- Epic Charter Schools
- International School for Science and Culture
- Irvine International Academy
- Journey School
- Kinetic Academy Huntington
- Magnolia Science Academy (Santa Ana)
- NOVA Academy Early College High School (Santa Ana)
- Opportunities for Learning (San Juan Capistrano)
- Orange County Academy of Sciences and Arts
- Orange County Classical Academy
- Orange County Educational Arts Academy
- Orange County School of the Arts
- Orange County Workforce Innovation High School
- Orange Prep School
- Oxford Preparatory Academy (Saddleback Valley, South Orange County)
- Palm Lane Charter
- Samueli Academy
- Scholarship Prep
- Suncoast Prep Academy
- Sycamore Creek Community Charter School
- The Nelson Mandela Charter of La Habra (formerly Gardez UCI School)
- Tomorrow's Leadership Collaborative (TLC) Charter School
- Unity Middle College High School
- Vibrant Minds Charter School
- Vista Charter Public Schools (Condor Global, Heritage Global, Meridian Global)

== Placer County ==
- Alta Vista Community Charter School
- Bowman Charter School
- Creekside Charter School
- Golden Valley Tahoe School
- Harvest Ridge Cooperative Charter School
- Horizon Charter Schools
- John Adams Academy (Lincoln, Roseville)
- Loomis Basin Charter School
- Maidu Virtual Charter Academy
- Maria Montessori Charter Academy
- Newcastle Charter School
- Placer Academy Charter School
- Placer County Pathways Charter School
- Rocklin Academy (Gateway, Meyers St., Turnstone)
- Sierra Expeditionary Learning
- Western Sierra Collegiate Academy

== Plumas County ==
- Plumas Charter School

== Riverside County ==
- Audeo Valley Charter School
- California Military Academy
- Cielo Vista Charter School
- Come Back Kids
- Excelsior Charter School (Corona)
- Garvey / Allen Visual Performing Arts Academy for STEM
- Gateway College and Career Academy
- George Washington Charter School
- Highland Academy
- Imagine Schools (Coachella, Hemet)
- The Journey School
- Julia Lee Performing Arts Academy
- Julian Charter School (Pine Hills)
- Leadership Military Academy
- Learn4Life (Vista Norte)
- Mission Vista Academy
- NOVA Academy Early College High School (Coachella)
- Nuview Bridge Early College High School
- Palm Desert Charter Middle School
- Pivot Charter School, Riverside
- REACH Leadership STEAM Academy
- River Springs Charter School
- San Jacinto Valley Academy
- Santa Rosa Academy
- SCALE Leadership Academy East
- Springs Charter School (Casa Montessori, Classical, Corona Student Center, Da Vinci, Del Rio, Flabob Airport, Hemet Quest, i-Shine, )Magnolia, Palm, Rancho Cucamonga, Renaissance Real World, Renaissance Valley)
- Sycamore Academy of Science and Cultural Arts
- Temecula International Academy
- Temecula Preparatory School
- Temecula Valley Charter School
- Western Center Academy
- YouthBuild Charter School (Moreno Valley)

== Sacramento County ==
- Alpha Charter School
- American River Collegiate Academy
- Aspire Schools (Alexander Twilight College Prep, Alexander Twilight Secondary, Capitol Heights)
- California Innovative Career Academy
- California Montessori Project (Capitol, Elk Grove, San Juan)
- Capitol Collegiate Academy
- Community Collaborative Charter School
- Community Outreach Academy Elementary
- Creative Connections Arts Academy
- Delta Elementary Charter School
- Elk Grove Charter School
- Folsom Cordova K-8 Community Charter School
- Fortune School of Education
- Futures High School
- Gateway Community Charter Schools (9 schools)
- Gateway International School
- George Washington Carver School of Arts and Science
- Golden Valley Schools (Orchard, River)
- Growth Public School
- Heritage Peak Charter School
- Higher Learning Academy
- Highlands Community Charter and Technical Schools
- Language Academy of Sacramento
- Leroy Greene Academy
- Learn4Life (Marconi Learning Academy)
- Met Sacramento
- Natomas Charter School
- New Hope Charter School
- New Joseph Bonnheim (NJB) Community Charter School
- New Technology High School
- Options for Youth (San Juan)
- Paseo Grande Charter School
- Sacramento Charter High School
- Sacramento Academic and Vocational Academy (SAVA)
- San Juan Choices Charter School
- Smythe Academy of Arts and Sciences
- Sol Aureus College Preparatory
- St. Hope Public Schools
- Visions in Education
- Westlake Charter School
- Westside Preparatory Charter School
- Yav Pem Suab Academy

== San Benito County ==
- Hollister Prep School

== San Bernardino County ==
- Academy for Academic Excellence
- Academy of Careers and Exploration
- Allegiance STEAM Academy
- ASA Charter School
- Ballington Academy for the Arts and Sciences (San Bernardino)
- Competitive Edge Charter Academy (CECA)
- Desert Trails Preparatory Academy
- Elite Academic Academy (Lucerne)
- Empire Springs Charter School
- Encore Jr./Sr. High School for the Performing and Visual Arts
- Entrepreneur High School
- Excel Academy Charter School
- Excel Prep Charter School
- Excelsior Charter School (Barstow, Corona, North Victorville, Ontario, Phelan, Redlands, San Bernardino, Victorville)
- Gorman Learning Center (San Bernardino/Santa Clarita)
- Granite Mountain Charter School
- Grove Charter School
- Hardy Brown College Prep School
- Independence Charter Academy
- Inland Leaders Charter School
- LaVerne Elementary Preparatory Academy
- Learn4Life (Alta Vista Innovation High, Antelope Valley Learning Academy, AV Learning Academy)
- Mirus Secondary School
- Mojave River Academy (Gold Canyon, Marble City, National Trails, Oro Grande, Rockview Park, Route 66, Silver Mountain)
- Mountain View Montessori Charter School
- New Vision Middle School
- Norton Science and Language Academy
- Options for Youth (Victorville, San Bernardino)
- Pathways to College
- Provisional Accelerated Learning Academy
- Public Safety Academy
- Riverside Preparatory School
- Sage Oak Charter School
- Savant Preparatory Academy of Business
- Sixth Street Prep School
- Sky Mountain Charter School
- SOAR Charter Academy
- Summit Leadership Academy (High Desert)
- Sycamore Academy of Science and Cultural Arts (Chino Valley)
- Taylion High Desert Academy
- Virtual Preparatory Academy at Lucerne
- Vista Norte Public Charter
- Woodward Leadership Academy
- YouthBuild Charter School (San Bernardino)

== San Diego County ==
- All Tribes Charter School
- Arroyo Vista Charter School
- Audeo Charter School II/III
- Barona Indian Charter School
- Baypoint Preparatory Academy (San Diego)
- Bella Mente Montessori Academy
- Bostonia Global School
- Brookfield Engineering Science Technology Academy
- Cabrillo Point Academy
- California Pacific Charter School (San Diego)
- California Virtual Academy (San Diego)
- Chula Vista Learning Community Charter School
- Classical Academy High School
- Coastal Academy Charter School
- College Preparatory Middle School
- Community Montessori School
- Compass Charter Schools of San Diego
- Dimensions Collaborative
- Discovery Charter School
- Dual Language Immersion North County
- EJE Charter School
- Elite Academic Academy (Mountain Empire)
- Escondido Charter High School
- Excel Academy Charter School
- Feaster (Mae L.) Charter School
- Greater San Diego Academy
- Grossmont Secondary School
- Guajome Learning Center
- Guajome Park Academy
- Harbor Springs Charter School
- Hawking S.T.E.A.M. Charter School
- The Heights Charter School
- Helix High School
- Heritage K-8 Charter School
- High Tech Elementary Chula Vista
- High Tech Elementary Explorer
- High Tech High International
- High Tech Media Arts
- High Tech Mesa
- High Tech North County
- Howard Gardner Community Charter School
- Imperial Beach Charter School
- Insight School San Diego
- Integrity Charter School
- Julian Charter School (Cedar Cove, Manzanita, Mountain Oaks, Pine Valley)
- Kidinnu Academy
- Learning Choice Academy (East County)
- Leonardo da Vinci Health Sciences Charter School
- Literacy First Charter School
- MAAC Community Charter School
- Methodschools
- Motivated Youth Academy
- Mueller (Robert L.) Charter School
- North County Trade Tech High School
- Pacific Coast Academy
- Pacific Springs Charter School
- Pacific View Charter School
- Pivot Charter School (San Diego)
- The Preuss School UCSD
- Sage Oak Charter School (South)
- San Diego Workforce Innovation High School
- Scholarship Prep (Oceanside)
- SIATech
- Sparrow Academy
- Steele Canyon High School
- Sweetwater Secondary School
- Vista Springs Charter School
- Vivian Banks Charter School

=== City of San Diego ===
- Albert Einstein Academies
- America's Finest Charter School
- Audeo Charter School I
- Charter School of San Diego
- City Heights Preparatory Charter School
- Darnall Charter School
- E3 Civic High School
- Elevate Elementary School
- Empower Language Academy
- Gompers Preparatory Academy
- Harriet Tubman Village Charter School
- Health Sciences High School
- Holly Drive Leadership Academy
- Iftin Charter School
- Ingenuity Charter School
- Innovations Academy
- Kavod Charter School
- Keiller Leadership Academy
- King-Chavez Academy (Arts, Community, Excellence, Prep, Primary)
- KIPP Adelante Preparatory Academy
- Learn4Life (Diego Hills Central, Diego Valley East, Innovation High San Diego)
- Magnolia Science Academy (San Diego)
- McGill School of Success
- Museum School
- Nestor Language Academy Charter School
- Old Town Academy K-8 Charter School
- River Valley Charter School
- San Diego Cooperative Charter School
- San Diego Mission Academy
- San Diego Virtual School
- School for Entrepreneurship and Technology
- SD Global Vision Academy
- The O'Farrell Charter Schools
- Urban Discovery Academy Charter School

== San Francisco County ==
- City Arts and Tech High School
- Creative Arts Charter School
- Five Keys Charter School/Independence HS
- Gateway High School
- KIPP (Bayview, San Francisco Bay, San Francisco College Prep)
- Leadership High School
- Life Learning Academy Charter School
- Mission Preparatory School
- The New School of San Francisco
- Thomas Edison Charter Academy

== San Joaquin County ==
- Aspire Schools (APEX, Arts & Sciences, Benjamin Holt College Prep, Benjamin Holt Middle, Langston Hughes, Port City, River Oaks Charter, Rosa Parks, Stockton Secondary, Vincent Shalvey)
- Banta Charter School
- California Connections Academy (North Bay, Ripon)
- California Virtual Academy (San Joaquin)
- Delta Charter School (Bridges, Home, Keys, Online)
- Discovery Charter School
- Dr. Lewis Dolphin Stallworth Sr. Charter School
- EPIC Academy
- Escalon Charter Academy
- Health Careers Academy
- Humphreys College Academy of Business, Law and Education
- Insight School (San Joaquin)
- Joe Serna Jr. Charter School
- John McCandless Charter School
- KIPP Stockton
- Millennium Charter School
- New Jerusalem Elementary School
- NextGeneration STEAM Academy
- Nightingale Charter School
- one.Charter Elementary Academy
- Pacific Law Academy
- Pittman Charter School
- Primary Charter School
- Rio Valley Charter School
- River Islands Technology Academy II
- Stockton Collegiate International Schools
- Stockton Early College Academy
- TEAM Charter School
- Tracy Learning Center
- Valley View Charter Prep School
- Venture Academy
- Voices College-Bound Language Academies (Stockton)

== San Luis Obispo County ==
- Almond Acres Charter Academy
- Bellevue-Santa Fe Charter School
- Grizzly ChalleNGe Charter School

== San Mateo County ==
- Aspire Schools (East Palo Alto Charter)
- California Virtual Academy (San Mateo)
- Connect Community Charter School
- Design Tech High School
- East Palo Alto Academy
- Everest Public High School
- KIPP (Esperanza, Excelencia, Valiant)
- Oxford Day Academy
- Rocketship Public Schools (Redwood City Prep)
- San Carlos Charter Learning Center
- Summit Preparatory Charter High School
- Summit Public School: Shasta

== Santa Barbara County ==
- Adelante Charter School
- California Connections Academy (Central Coast)
- Family Partnership Charter School
- Manzanita Public Charter School
- Olive Grove Charter School (Buellton, Lompoc, Orcutt, Santa Barbara)
- Orcutt Academy Charter School
- Peabody Charter School
- Santa Barbara Charter School
- Santa Ynez Valley Charter School
- Trivium Charter School (Adventure, Voyage)

== Santa Clara County ==
- ACE Charter Schools (Charter High, Empower, Esperanza, Inspire)
- Alpha Charter Schools (Blanca Alvarado, Cindy Avitia, Cornerstone, Jose Hernandez)
- Aptitud Community Academy at Goss
- B. Roberto Cruz Leadership Academy
- Bullis Charter School
- Campbell School of Innovation
- Charter School of Morgan Hill
- Discovery Charter School I/II
- DCP El Primero High School
- Farnham Charter School
- Gilroy Prep School
- Ida Jew Academies
- KIPP (Heartwood, Heritage, Navigate, Prize, San Jose Collegiate)
- Latino College Preparatory Academy
- Luis Valdez Leadership Academy
- Metropolitan Education District
- Opportunity Youth Academy
- Perseverance Preparatory School
- Price Charter Middle School
- Rocketship Public Schools (Alma, Brilliant Minds, Discovery Prep, Fuerza Community Prep, Los Sueños, Mateo Sheedy, Mosaic, Rising Stars, Sí Se Puede, Spark)
- San Jose Conservation Corps Charter School
- Sartorette Charter School
- Summit Public School (Denali, Tahoma)
- University Preparatory Charter Academy
- Voices College-Bound Language Academies (Franklin-McKinley, Morgan Hill, Mount Pleasant)

== Santa Cruz County ==
- Alianza Charter School
- California Connections Academy (Monterey Bay)
- Ceiba College Preparatory Academy
- Delta Charter School
- Diamond Technology Institute
- Linscott Charter School
- Ocean Grove Charter School
- Pacific Coast Charter School
- Pacific Collegiate School
- Santa Cruz County Career Advancement Center
- SLVUSD Charter School
- Tierra Pacifica Charter School
- Watsonville Charter School of the Arts
- Watsonville Prep School

== Shasta County ==
- Anderson New Technology High School
- Chrysalis Charter School
- Cottonwood Creek Charter School
- Monarch Learning Center
- Northern Summit Academy Shasta
- PACE Academy Charter School
- Phoenix Charter Academy
- Redding Collegiate Academy
- Redding School of the Arts
- Redding STEM Academy
- Rocky Point Charter School
- Shasta Charter Academy
- Shasta View Academy
- Stellar Charter School
- Tree of Life International Charter School
- University Preparatory School

== Siskiyou County ==
- Golden Eagle Charter School
- Northern United Siskiyou Charter School

== Solano County ==
- Buckingham Charter Magnet High School
- Caliber: ChangeMakers Academy
- Dixon Montessori Charter School
- Elite Public School
- Ernest Kimme Charter Academy for Independent Learning
- Fairmont Charter Elementary School
- Griffin Academy High School
- Kairos Public School Vacaville Academy
- Mare Island Technology Academy
- MIT Academy
- Vallejo Charter School

== Sonoma County ==
- Binkley Elementary Charter School
- Cali Calmecac Language Academy
- California Pacific Charter School (Sonoma)
- California Virtual Academy (Sonoma)
- Cesar Chavez Language Academy
- Cinnabar Charter School
- Dunham Charter School
- Forestville Academy
- Heartwood Charter School
- Kid Street Learning Center Charter
- Liberty Independent Study School
- Live Oak Charter School
- Loma Vista Immersion Academy
- Mark West Charter School
- Mary Collins Charter School at Cherry Valley
- Miwok Valley Elementary Charter School
- Morrice Schaefer Charter School
- Northwest Prep Charter School
- Old Adobe Elementary Charter School
- Olivet Elementary Charter School
- Orchard View School
- Pathways Charter School
- Petaluma Accelerated Charter
- Piner-Olivet Charter
- Pivot Charter School (North Bay)
- Rincon Valley Charter School
- River Montessori Elementary Charter School
- Roseland Charter School
- Salmon Creek School - A Charter
- Santa Rosa Accelerated Charter School
- Santa Rosa Charter School for the Arts
- Santa Rosa French-American Charter School (SRFACS)
- Sebastopol Independent Charter School
- Sonoma Charter School
- Spring Creek Matanzas Charter School
- SunRidge Charter School
- Twin Hills Charter Middle School
- Village Charter School
- Whited Elementary Charter School
- Woodland Star Charter School
- Wright Charter School

== Stanislaus County ==
- Aspire Schools (Summit Charter, University Charter, Vanguard College Prep)
- Connecting Waters Charter School
- Denair Charter Academy
- eCademy Charter at Crane
- Fusion Charter School
- Gratton Charter School
- Great Valley Academy
- Hart-Ransom Academic Charter School
- Hickman Community Charter School District
- Independence Charter School
- Keyes to Learning Charter School
- Oakdale Charter School
- Paradise Charter School
- Riverbank Language Academy
- Roberts Ferry Charter School Academy
- Shiloh Charter School
- Stanislaus Alternative Charter School
- Valley College High School
- Whitmore Charter School of Art & Technology

== Sutter County ==
- AeroSTEM Academy
- California Virtual Academy (Sutter)
- Feather River Charter School
- Pathways Charter Academy
- South Sutter Charter School
- Sutter Peak Charter Academy
- Twin Rivers Charter School
- Winship Community School
- Yuba City Charter School

== Tehama County ==
- Evergreen Institute of Excellence
- Lassen-Antelope Volcanic Academy (LAVA)
- Lincoln Street School
- Tehama eLearning Academy

== Trinity County ==
- California Heritage Youthbuild Academy II

== Tulare County ==
- Accelerated Charter High School
- Blue Oak Academy
- Butterfield Charter School
- California Connections Academy (Central Valley)
- Charter Home School Academy
- Eleanor Roosevelt Community Learning Center
- Global Learning Charter
- Harmony Magnet Academy
- Learn4Life (Crescent Valley Public Charter II)
- Loma Vista Charter School
- Monarch River Academy
- Porterville Military Academy
- Sequoia Elementary Charter School
- Sierra Vista Charter High School
- Summit Charter Academy
- Sycamore Valley Academy
- University Preparatory High School
- Valley Life Charter School
- Visalia Charter Independent Study
- Visalia Technical Early College

== Tuolomne County ==
- Connections Visual and Performing Arts Academy
- Gold Rush Charter School

== Ventura County ==
- Architecture, Construction & Engineering Charter High School (ACE)
- BRIDGES Charter School
- Camarillo Academy of Progressive Education
- Golden Valley Charter School
- IvyTech Charter School
- Learn4Life (Vista Real Charter High Camarillo, VRCHS Oxnard, VRCHS Port Hueneme, VRCHS Santa Paula, VRCHS Simi Valley, VRCHS Ventura Telegraph)
- Meadows Arts and Technology Elementary School
- Opportunities for Learning (Simi Valley)
- Peak Prep Pleasant Valley
- River Oaks Academy
- University Preparation Charter School at CSU Channel Islands
- Valley Oak Charter School
- Ventura Charter School of Arts and Global Education

== Yolo County ==
- Compass Charter School (Yolo)
- Da Vinci Charter Academy
- Empowering Possibilities International Charter School
- River Charter Schools Lighthouse Charter School
- Sacramento Valley Charter School
- Science & Technology Academy at Knights Landing
- Washington Middle College High School

== Yuba County ==
- CORE Charter School
- Marysville Charter Academy for the Arts
- Paragon Collegiate Academy
- Wheatland Charter Academy
- Yuba County Career Preparatory Charter School
- Yuba Environmental Science Charter Academy
