= YCCS =

YCCS may refer to:

- Youth Connection Charter School (Chicago)
- Yuba City Charter School
- Yacht Club Costa Smeralda (Porto Cervo)
