= Excel Charter Academy =

Excel Charter Academy can refer to:

- A charter school in Los Angeles, California operated by PUC Schools
- A charter school in Grand Rapids, Michigan operated by National Heritage Academies
