= Lakeside Union School District (San Diego County, California) =

School district in California, United States

Address
- 12335 Woodside Avenue Lakeside, California, 92040; United States

District information
- Grades: K–12
- Established: March 4, 1890
- Superintendent: Scott Goergens
- Schools: 10
- NCES District ID: 0620790

Students and staff
- Students: 4,679 (2020–2021)
- Teachers: 208.33 (FTE)
- Staff: 259.66 (FTE)
- Student–teacher ratio: 22.46:1

Other information
- Website: www.lsusd.net

Lakeside Union School District is a public school district based in the East County area of San Diego County, California, United States. It includes six elementary schools (K–5), two middle schools (6–8), two charter schools (K–8 and 7–12), and three preschools. It is governed by an elected five-member board. The district's origins date to 1889.

The school district has ten schools: Lakeview Elementary, Lemon Crest Elementary, Eucalyptus Hills Elementary, Lakeside Farms Elementary, Lindo Park Elementary, Riverview Elementary, Lakeside Middle School,Tierra Del Sol Middle School, River Valley Charter School, and Barona Charter School.
