= Environmental Charter School =

Environmental Charter School may refer to:

- Environmental Charter Schools, in the Los Angeles area, California, United States
- Environmental Charter School, in Pittsburgh, Pennsylvania, United States
- Quail Lake Environmental Charter School, in Clovis, California, United States
