= Jimmy Johnson (cornerback) =

American football player (1938–2024)

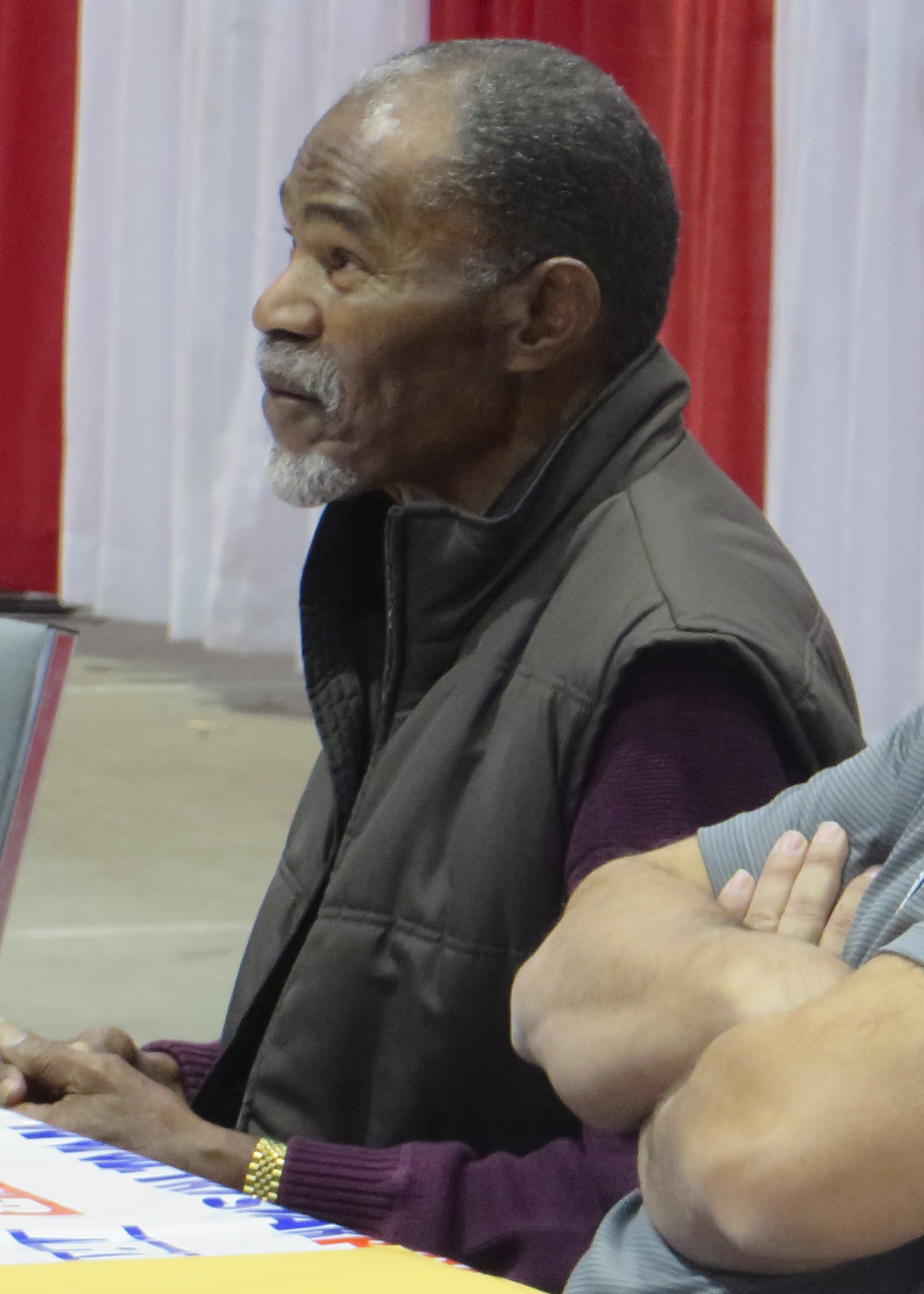
- Johnson in 2014

No. 37
- Position: Cornerback

Personal information
- Born: March 31, 1938; Dallas, Texas, U.S.
- Died: May 8, 2024 (aged 86); San Francisco Bay Area, California, U.S.
- Listed height: 6 ft 2 in (1.88 m)
- Listed weight: 187 lb (85 kg)

Career information
- High school: Kingsburg (Kingsburg, California)
- College: Santa Monica College (1957-1958); UCLA (1959-1960)
- NFL draft: 1961: 1st round, 6th overall pick
- AFL draft: 1961: 4th round, 32nd overall pick

Career history
- San Francisco 49ers (1961–1976)

Awards and highlights
- 4× First-team All-Pro (1969–1972); 4× Second-team All-Pro (1964–1966, 1968); 5× Pro Bowl (1969–1972, 1974); George Halas Award (1972); NFL 1970s All-Decade Team; San Francisco 49ers Hall of Fame; San Francisco 49ers No. 37 retired

Career NFL statistics
- Interceptions: 47
- Interception yards: 615
- Fumble recoveries: 7
- Safeties: 1
- Touchdowns: 6
- Stats at Pro Football Reference
- Pro Football Hall of Fame

James Earl Johnson (March 31, 1938 – May 8, 2024) was an American professional football player who was a cornerback for the San Francisco 49ers of the National Football League (NFL) from 1961 to 1976. He was named to the first team on the NFL 1970s All-Decade Team, and in 1994, he was inducted into the Pro Football Hall of Fame.

Johnson was born in Dallas and raised in Kingsburg, California. He was the younger brother of Rafer Johnson, winner of the decathlon gold medal at the 1960 Summer Olympics. Johnson played college football for the UCLA Bruins and was selected by the 49ers in the first round of the 1961 NFL draft. He was selected four times as a first-team All-Pro and played in five Pro Bowls. His jersey No. 37 was retired by the 49ers in 1977.

== Early life ==
Johnson was born on March 31, 1938, in Dallas. His family moved to central California when Johnson was a boy. He attended Kingsburg High School in Kingsburg in Fresno County.

Johnson's older brother Rafer preceded him as a multi-sport star at Kingsburg High School and UCLA, ultimately winning the gold medal in the decathlon at the 1960 Summer Olympics.

== College career ==
Johnson first attended the Santa Monica College, playing for the Santa Monica Corsairs football team in 1957 and 1958. He then transferred to the University of California, Los Angeles and played for the UCLA Bruins football team as a wingback and cornerback. He totaled 812 yards from scrimmage in 1959 and 1960. Johnson also competed in track at UCLA, he won the NCAA 110-meter hurdles championship and was named an All-American in track and field.

While a student at UCLA, Johnson joined Pi Lambda Phi Fraternity, where he is recognized as a prominent alumni brother.

== Professional career ==
Johnson was selected by the San Francisco 49ers in the first round with the sixth overall pick of the 1961 NFL draft, and by the San Diego Chargers in the fourth round with the 32nd overall pick of the 1961 AFL draft. He signed with the 49ers in June 1961. As a rookie, Johnson appeared in 12 games for the 1961 49ers, played at the cornerback position, and intercepted five passes for a career-high 116 return yards. He became a flanker in 1962 and caught 34 passes for 626 yards and four touchdowns. His most productive game as a flanker came against the Detroit Lions, in which he caught 11 passes for 181 yards. Earlier that season, he caught a game-winning 80-yard touchdown reception against the Chicago Bears, which at the time was the longest scoring pass in 49ers history. Johnson returned to defense in 1963 and played principally at cornerback for the rest of his career. He remained with the 49ers for 16 years through the 1976 season, appearing in 213 NFL games.

During his 16 years in the NFL, Johnson intercepted 47 passes for 615 return yards and two touchdowns in his NFL career. He was selected four times as a first-team All-Pro: 1969 (AP, UPI), 1970 (AP, NEA, Pro Football Writers, Pro Football Weekly), 1971 (AP, NEA, Pro Football Writers, Pro Football Weekly), and 1972 (AP, NEA, Pro Football Writers, Pro Football Weekly). He was also selected to play in five Pro Bowls (1969–1972, 1974). According to his biography at the Pro Football Hall of Fame, Johnson is regarded as "one of the best man-to-man defenders in history."

== Death ==
Johnson died on May 8, 2024, aged 86, in California's San Francisco Bay Area.

== Honors ==
Johnson received numerous honors for his football career, including the following:

- In 1977, the 49ers retired Johnson's jersey (No. 37) during halftime of a Monday night game dubbed "Jimmy Johnson Night at Candlestick Park."
- In 1978, Johnson was inducted into the Fresno Athletic Hall of Fame.
- In 1980, Johnson and Willie Brown were named the first-string cornerbacks on the NFL 1970s All-Decade Team.
- In 1990, Johnson was inducted into the Bay Area Sports Hall of Fame.
- In 1992, Johnson was inducted into the UCLA Athletics Hall of Fame.
- In 1994, he was inducted into the Pro Football Hall of Fame.
- In 2009, he was one of the charter inductees into the San Francisco 49ers Hall of Fame.
