= Andrew Vorhees =

American football player (born 1999)

No. 74 – Atlanta Falcons
- Position: Offensive guard
- Roster status: Active

Personal information
- Born: January 21, 1999 (age 27); Kingsburg, California, U.S.
- Listed height: 6 ft 6 in (1.98 m)
- Listed weight: 330 lb (150 kg)

Career information
- High school: Kingsburg
- College: USC (2017–2022)
- NFL draft: 2023: 7th round, 229th overall pick

Career history
- Baltimore Ravens (2023–2026); Atlanta Falcons (2026–present)

Awards and highlights
- Morris Trophy (2022); First-team All-American (2022); First-team All-Pac-12 (2022)

Career NFL statistics as of Week 10, 2026
- Games played: 38
- Games started: 22
- Stats at Pro Football Reference

Andrew Michael Vorhees (born January 21, 1999) is an American professional football offensive guard for the Atlanta Falcons of the National Football League (NFL). He played college football for the USC Trojans.

== College career ==
After attending Kingsburg High School in Kingsburg, California, Vorhees committed to play college football for the USC Trojans in 2016. He was named as a first-team selection on the 2021 All-Pac-12 Conference football team. A super senior, Vorhees announced that he would return to USC in 2022. That season, he was named a first-team All-American and was the recipient of the Morris Trophy, awarded to the conference's best offensive lineman.

== Professional career ==
On March 5, 2023, Vorhees participated in the 2023 NFL Combine. During one of the drills he tore his ACL; he was slated to be a late first to early third round pick.

Pre-draft measurables
| Height | Weight | Arm length | Hand span | Wingspan | Vertical jump | Broad jump | Bench press |
|---|---|---|---|---|---|---|---|
| 6 ft 6 in (1.98 m) | 310 lb (141 kg) | 32 1/8 in (0.82 m) | 10 in (0.25 m) | 6 ft 5 3/4 in (1.97 m) | 29.0 in (0.74 m) | 8 ft 9 in (2.67 m) | 38 reps |
All values from NFL Combine

=== Baltimore Ravens ===
Vorhees was selected by the Baltimore Ravens in the seventh round with the 229th overall pick in the 2023 NFL draft. He was placed on the reserve/non-football injury list on August 29, 2023.

After missing his rookie season due to his pre-draft torn ACL, Vorhees was named the Ravens starting left guard for Week 1. He missed Weeks 4 and 5 due to an ankle injury, but lost the starting job to veteran Patrick Mekari for the remainder of the season. Then in 2025, Vorhees was once again named the starting left guard, and started all 17 games.

In 2026, after the signing of John Simpson and drafting of Vega Ioane, Vorhees was named a backup guard to begin the season.

=== Atlanta Falcons ===
On November 10, 2026, the Ravens traded Vorhees and a 2028 sixth-round pick to the Atlanta Falcons in exchange for offensive lineman Ryan Neuzil.
