= Everest Public High School =

Location
- 455 Fifth Avenue; Redwood City, California; United States; 37°28′25″N 122°12′15″W

Information
- School type: College prep Public Charter high school
- Established: 2009
- Closed: 2025
- Grades: 9–12
- Enrollment: 322 (2021-2022)
- Campus type: Suburban
- Color
- Team name: Snow Leopards
- Website: http://everest.summitps.org/

Everest Public High School was a college preparatory, tuition-free, and public charter high school in Redwood City, California, United States. The school, which was modeled after Summit Preparatory Charter High School in Redwood City, opened in August 2009 following State approval of the Everest charter. It closed at the end of the 2024–25 school year.

In 2016, Everest received U.S. News & World Report's Best High Schools Gold Award, ranking it as #21 in California and #186 nationally.

The AP® participation rate at Everest Public High was 97 percent. The student body makeup was 50 percent male and 50 percent female, and the total minority enrollment was 86 percent. GreatSchools gave Everest a 4 out of 10 rating.

The location of the school has been disputed, with Sequoia District seeking to relocate it to East Palo Alto, but a lawsuit with the district was settled in May 2010. In August 2011, Everest moved to its permanent location on 5th Avenue in Redwood City, where it remained until its closure in 2025.

Everest admitted roughly 60 freshmen each year. As per California state charter law, when the number of applicants to a charter school exceeds the number of open spots, offers of admission were distributed through a blind lottery.

== Academics ==
100% of Everest graduates met or exceeded the University of California A to G entrance requirements. The AP® participation rate at Everest Public High was 97 percent.

=== Freshmen ===
As freshmen, students take Biology, English 9, Modern World I, Math I, a fitting level of Spanish, two elective courses, and a self-directed learning (SDL) period, also known at some schools as Study Hall. During SDL, students work on projects and take content assessments. Content assessments are tests.

=== Sophomores ===
As sophomores, students take Physics, English 10, World History II, Mathematics II, a fitting level of Spanish, two expedition courses, and an SDL period. The workload increases by 30-50% from freshman year, as teachers continue to prepare students for college and for AP classes as juniors and seniors.

=== Juniors ===
As juniors, students take Chemistry, AP English Language, AP US History, Math III, any fitting level of Spanish, and 1-2 elective courses. They are also eligible for internships or independent study projects at home.

=== Seniors ===
As seniors, students must take AP Environmental Science (or chemistry depending on the teacher situation), AP English Literature, AP Calculus or Statistics, and AP Government. They are also eligible for internships or independent study projects at home.

=== Elective courses ===
For freshmen and sophomore years, Everest students take an elective course. This period is called "Expeditions," it was formerly called "Intersession". During this time students take two elective courses. Students rank their choice of courses and then they are assigned to two of their choices. Expeditions occurs four times every few months, each for four two-week sessions, or a total of eight weeks. The courses offered at Everest were same as they are offered in other schools in the Summit Public Schools system and do not occur at the same time.

== Clubs and teams ==
Everest formerly had a number of teams and clubs, run by pupils and supervised by teachers. Some of them were the Music Club, Everest Forensics Team (speech and debate), Culinary Diversity Club, Gender and Sexuality Alliance, Comic Club, Alliance of Latin American Students (ALAS), Creativity Club, and Young Dreamers Network (which does local and international charity work). The first club was the Asian Student Union, formed back in 2010 at the Old Building.

A club from the final years of the school's operation was the speech and debate club, affiliated with the Silicon Valley Urban Debate League (SVUDL). The club worked in conjunction with the SVUDL until the school's closure in 2025. The team has taken home several trophies and medals ranging from 5th place to 1st.

== New Format ==
Towards the end of the 2012–13 school year the faculty of Everest PHS, and its sister schools, informed parents and students that the next school year there would be some small changes. Throughout previous years, there were rumors that the schools would provide Chromebooks to students to use. Previously, the school had portable computers for the students to use. At the beginning of the 2013–14 school year, students were given Chromebooks and were told of the changes. The new changes included Self-Directed Learning, Friday PLT, the replacement of IL with PLT, replacement of tests with Content Assessments, and a new tardy policy.

The new system included several online tools such as the PLP Tool, ShowEvidence, Activate Instruction, Khan Academy, and Illuminate. The PLP Tool showed students where they stand in the year, their scores for projects, and what Content Assessments they have passed and need to pass. Students can use the tool to set goals and reflect on them later. ShowEvidence was used for projects as a means of instruction and a place to turn them in. Activate Instruction, which was introduced by Diane Tavenner on March 13, 2013, on the 20th Annual California Charter Schools Conference, is used as a means to host playlists where students can take content assessments, diagnostics, and study. Khan Academy is a third party website that the school uses. Khan Academy has a variety of videos lessons and exercises available to the public for free. Illuminate, the replacement of PowerSchool, is where students would check their grades. Since the new format changes, the school no longer has semesters and grades are given as "Projected Grades" on the PLP Tool. Illuminate is instead used to show how students did on Content Assessments and diagnostics. Many students, parents, and faculty have commented that one or more of the online resources do not work well or at all. Some concerns were over how the Content Assessments did not match the content covered in the Playlists. Before the new system was introduced, parents and students were not told of the major changes. Before the beginning of the 2013-2014 school year, Activate Instruction mentioned in their press release kit they had knowledge of the major changes before students and parents were even notified. Activate Instruction used this information to promote themselves.

== See also ==
- San Mateo County high schools
- List of closed secondary schools in California
