= Summit Public Schools (Charter school operator) =

Charter management organization in California, USA

- Headquarters: Redwood City, California
- Services: Charter school management
- Website: www.summitps.org
- 11 schools (2017)

Summit Public Schools is a charter management organization (CMO) that operates seven schools, five in the San Francisco Bay Area and two in Washington. The headquarters is located in Redwood City, California.

Summit is the recipient of a grant from the Bill and Melinda Gates Foundation.

== Schools ==
- Summit Preparatory Charter High School in Redwood City, CA
- Summit Tahoma in South San Jose, CA
- Summit K2 in El Cerrito, CA
- Summit Shasta in Daly City, CA, opened in 2013
- Summit Tamalpais in Richmond, CA
- Summit Sierra in Seattle, WA
- Summit Atlas in West Seattle, WA

Prior schools included Summit Rainier in East San Jose, CA (closed in June 2020), Summit Denali in Sunnyvale, CA (closed in June 2023), Everest Public High School in Redwood City, CA (closed in June 2025), and Summit Olympus in Tacoma, WA (closed in June 2025).

== Summit Learning ==
The pedagogy employed at Summit schools, dubbed "Summit Learning," is a personalized, project-based learning (PBL) curriculum that puts students "in charge" of their own learning.

Courses are built around projects done at students' own paces instead of traditional coursework modules, and teachers focus their energy on tutoring individual students as many grading functions are automated.
