= Kingsburg High School =

Coordinates: 36°31′07.6″N 119°32′48.0″W

Location
- 1900 18th Avenue, Kingsburg, California

Information
- School type: Public
- Established: 1908
- Principal: Ryan Phelan
- Teaching staff: 54.29 (FTE)
- Grades: 9 - 12
- Enrollment: 1,101 (2023–2024)
- Student to teacher ratio: 20.28
- Colors: Green and gold
- Mascot: Viking
- Newspaper: The Viking Voice
- Website: www.kingsburghigh.com

Kingsburg High School (KHS) is a public high school in Kingsburg, California, United States. The school is part of the Kingsburg Joint Union High School District. Its mascot is the Viking and its school colors are green and gold. As of 2018, the enrollment was 1,071 students.

The school's boundary includes Kingsburg and Traver.

== Academic achievements ==
Kingsburg High School's academic achievements include:

- A graduation rate of 99.6% in 2019.
- 72.2% of students qualified as college/career ready in 2019
- 72% of students met or exceeded standard in ELA (#8 in Fresno/Tulare Counties)
- 46.9% of students met or exceeded standard in MATH (#5 in Fresno/Tulare Counties)

== Resources ==
The resources offered to students by Kingsburg High school include a college and career center dedicated to helping students plan for life after leaving high school, a laptop program that provides each student with a functioning computer to be used for school related activities and assignments, and two different versions of many of the online resources/documents, one in Spanish and one in English, to accommodate to the school's number of Spanish speaking students and parents.

== Annual events ==
The events put on annually by Kingsburg High School include:

- Rivalry week
- Homecoming week
- Dances: Homecoming, Formal, Back to school dance, Sadie's, and Prom
- Rotary top 40 dinner
- FFA Tri-tip dinner

== Athletics ==
Kingsburg High School competes in the Central Section of the California Interscholastic Federation as a member of the Tri-County Athletic Conference.

Fall

- Football
- Volleyball
- Cross country
- Girls' golf
- Boys' water polo
- Girls' water polo
- Girls' tennis
- Viking Marching Band

Winter

- Boys' basketball
- Girls' basketball
- Boys' soccer
- Girls' soccer
- Wrestling

Spring

- Baseball
- Softball
- Swimming & diving
- Track & field
- Boys' golf
- Boys' tennis

== Notable alumni ==
- Tyler Bray, former University of Tennessee and NFL QB
- Monte Clark, former NFL player and head coach
- Jimmy Johnson, former NFL player
- Rafer Johnson, Olympic decathlon gold medalist
- Goran Lingmerth, former NFL player
- Melissa Price, women's pole vault pioneer
- Andrew Vorhees, current NFL player
- Jake Woods, former Major League Baseball player
