= California Creative Learning Academy =

Public charter school in Los Angeles, California

Location
- 2709 Media Center Drive, Los Angeles, CA 90065; United States; 34.11109592081958°N 118.24547218883193°W

Information
- Other name: CalCreative
- Former name: Los Feliz Charter School for the Arts
- Type: Public charter school
- Established: 2006
- School district: Los Angeles Unified School District
- Principal: Dr. Linda Lee
- Grades: K-5
- Website: calcreative.org

California Creative Learning Academy (formerly the Los Feliz Charter School for the Arts) is a public charter school located in Los Angeles, California. Founded in 2006 in the city's Los Feliz neighborhood, the school specializes in arts integration and education.

== History ==
The Los Feliz Charter School for the Arts was founded in the Los Angeles neighborhood of the same name in 2006, driven by a teaching methodology focused on the arts. In 2010, the school relocated to the Glassell Park former film studio known as the Media Center. It is considered a constructivist and multidisciplinary program.

Alongside Larchmont Charter School, the school received scrutiny from the Los Angeles Times in 2011 for an early policy that allowed parents to bypass the admissions lottery system in exchange for a significant parental volunteer commitment. Though the policy was legal, openly discussed with regulators, and eventually ended, Los Feliz Charter School for the Arts received criticism from opponents of charter schools for the practice.

In June 2021, the school changed its name from Los Feliz Charter School for the Arts to California Creative Learning Academy (CalCreative). In March 2026, the middle school's charter was not renewed by the Los Angeles Unified School District. The school subsequently appealed to the Los Angeles County Office of Education, but the appeal was unsuccessful, resulting in the expiration of the middle school charter in June 2026.
