= Kingsburg, California =

City in California, United States

- City
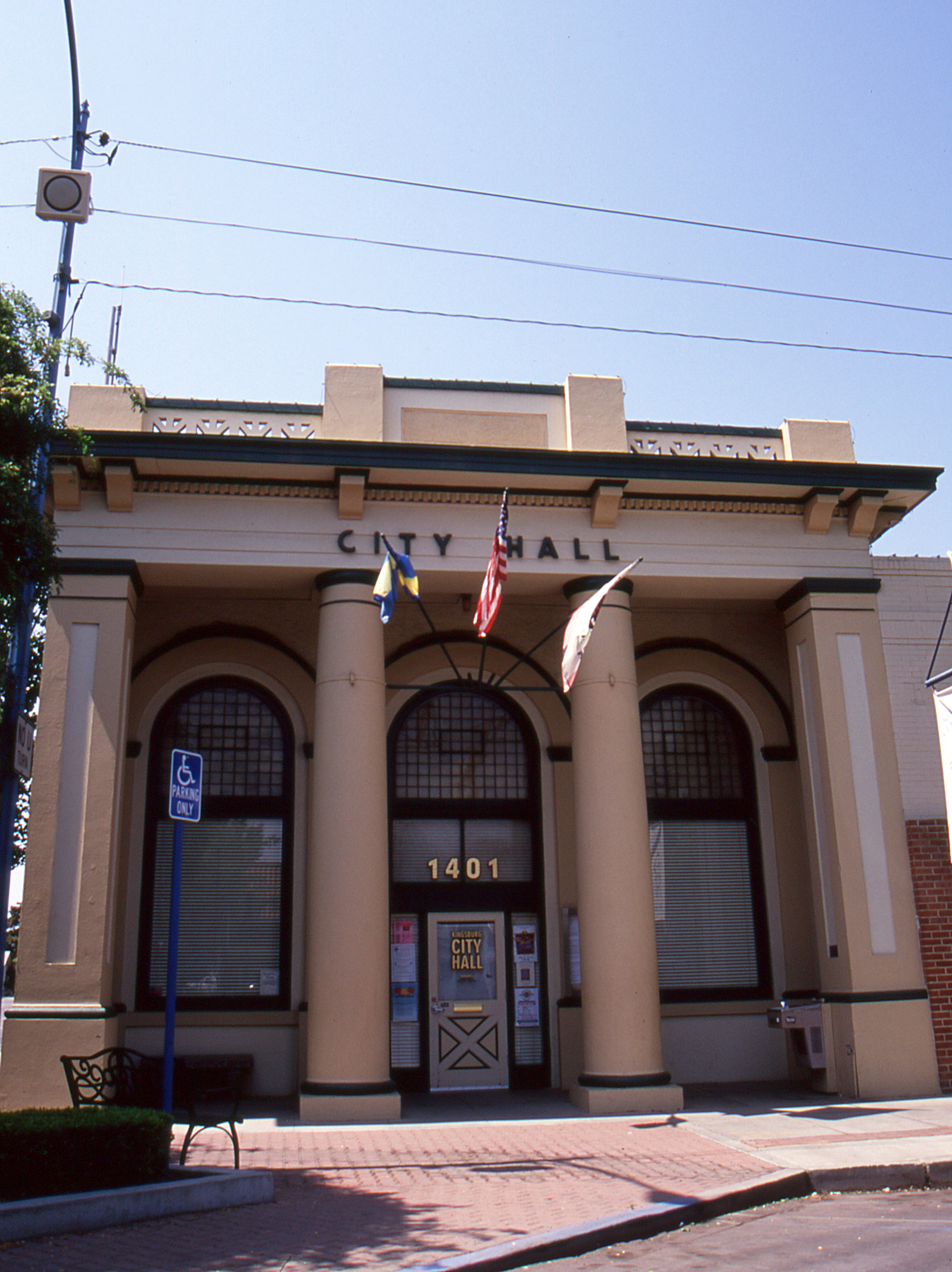
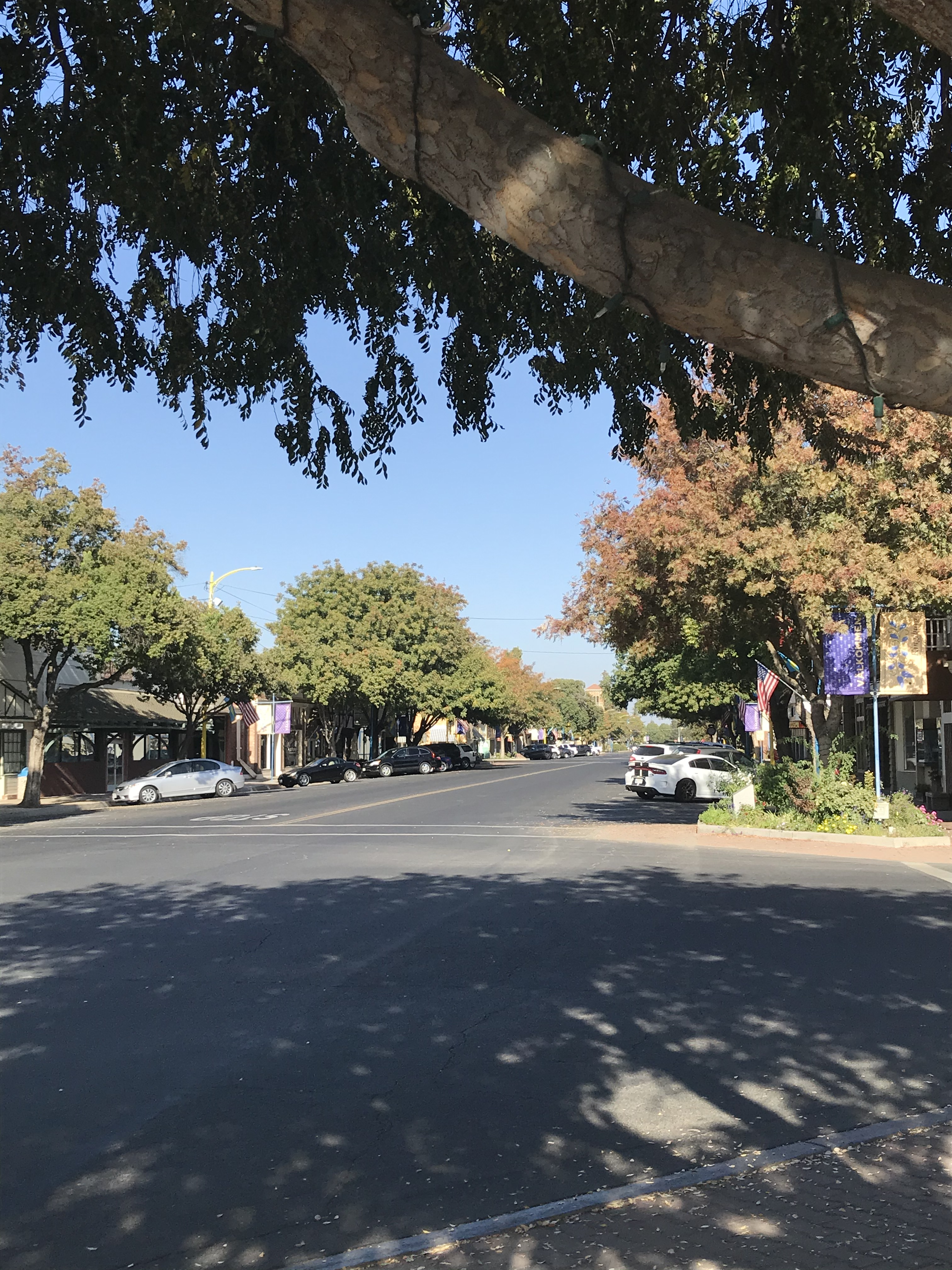

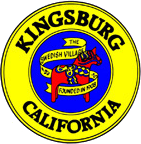
- Seal
- Motto(s): Past, Present and Future: Celebrating Kingsburg
- Interactive map of Kingsburg, California
- Location in the United States
- Coordinates: 36°30′50″N 119°33′14″W
- Country: United States
- State: California
- County: Fresno
- Incorporated: May 29, 1908
- Named for: Kings River

Government
  - Mayor: Staci Smith
  - Mayor Pro Tem: Vince Palomar
  - State Senate: Melissa Hurtado (D)
  - State Assembly: Alexandra Macedo (R)
  - U. S. Congress: Jim Costa (D)

Area
  - Total: 3.72 sq mi (9.63 km^{2})
  - Land: 3.72 sq mi (9.63 km^{2})
  - Water: 0 sq mi (0.00 km^{2}) 0%
- Elevation: 302 ft (92 m)

Population (2020)
  - Total: 12,380
  - Density: 3,330/sq mi (1,286/km^{2})
- Time zone: UTC−08:00 (PST)
  - Summer (DST): UTC−07:00 (PDT)
- ZIP Code: 93631
- Area code: 559
- FIPS code: 06-38562
- Website: www.cityofkingsburg-ca.gov

Kingsburg is a city in Fresno County, California, United States. Kingsburg is located 5 miles (8 km) southeast of Selma at an elevation of 302 feet (92 m), on the banks of the Kings River. The city is 21 miles (34 km) from Fresno, and about 130 miles (210 km) from the California Central Coast and Sierra Nevada mountain range. The population was 12,380 at the 2020 census.

== History ==
Kingsburg was established as a railroad town, its site set by the Central Pacific Railroad when it completed the Valley Line in 1873. In the early 1870s, Swedish natives settled in a railroad town called "Kings River Switch". Kingsburg started out as a flag stop on the Central Pacific Railroad called Kings River Switch. In 1874 Kingsburg was called Wheatville and had a post office, later that year they changed the name to Kingsbury. During this time period, Josiah Draper and Andrew Farley each owned a quarter section, about 160 acres (65 ha), Draper on the east side of the railroad tracks and Farley on the west side of the tracks. So it was suggested that the east side be called Drapersville and the west side called Farleyville. Two years after that it became Kingsburgh and in January 1894 took on its present spelling, "Kingsburg", which was finally established as a town in 1908. By 1921, ninety-four percent of the population within a three-mile radius of Kingsburg was Swedish-American, giving the community the nickname of "Little Sweden". To keep up with the town's Swedish history most retail businesses are designed in Swedish architecture.

== Geography ==
Kingsburg is located in the central portion of the Central Valley of California. The town is two hours away from the Sierra Nevada Mountain range and from the coast. It is approximately 3–4 hours away from Los Angeles, San Francisco, and Sacramento. According to the United States Census Bureau, the city has a total area of 3.7 square miles (9.6 km^{2}), all land.

== Demographics ==
Historical population
Census	Pop.	Note	%±
1880	88		—
1890	291		230.7%
1910	634		—
1920	1,316		107.6%
1930	1,322		0.5%
1940	1,504		13.8%
1950	2,310		53.6%
1960	3,093		33.9%
1970	3,843		24.2%
1980	5,115		33.1%
1990	7,205		40.9%
2000	9,199		27.7%
2010	11,382		23.7%
2020	12,380		8.8%
2024 (est.)	13,128	▲	6.0%
U.S. Decennial Census

=== 2020 census ===
As of the 2020 census, Kingsburg had a population of 12,380. The population density was 3,330.6 inhabitants per square mile (1,286.0/km^{2}). The median age was 36.8 years. 25.9% of residents were under the age of 18, 9.0% were aged 18 to 24, 25.3% were aged 25 to 44, 23.3% were aged 45 to 64, and 16.5% were 65 years of age or older. For every 100 females, there were 92.7 males, and for every 100 females age 18 and over, there were 87.9 males age 18 and over.

The census reported that 99.4% of the population lived in households and 0.6% were institutionalized. 99.6% of residents lived in urban areas, while 0.4% lived in rural areas.

There were 4,259 households, of which 39.5% had children under the age of 18 living in them. Of all households, 54.8% were married-couple households, 5.0% were cohabiting couple households, 26.8% had a female householder with no spouse or partner present, and 13.4% had a male householder with no spouse or partner present. About 21.5% of all households were made up of individuals, and 12.2% had someone living alone who was 65 years of age or older. The average household size was 2.89. There were 3,154 families (74.1% of all households).

There were 4,415 housing units, of which 4,259 (96.5%) were occupied. Of occupied units, 63.5% were owner-occupied and 36.5% were renter-occupied. The homeowner vacancy rate was 1.2%, and the rental vacancy rate was 3.1%.

Racial composition as of the 2020 census
Race	Number	Percent
White	6,875	55.5%
Black or African American	65	0.5%
American Indian and Alaska Native	179	1.4%
Asian	422	3.4%
Native Hawaiian and Other Pacific Islander	14	0.1%
Some other race	2,671	21.6%
Two or more races	2,154	17.4%
Hispanic or Latino (of any race)	5,974	48.3%

=== 2023 ACS 5-year estimates ===
In 2023, the US Census Bureau estimated that 9.9% of the population were foreign-born. Of all people aged 5 or older, 79.2% spoke only English at home, 14.4% spoke Spanish, 1.7% spoke other Indo-European languages, 4.0% spoke Asian or Pacific Islander languages, and 0.6% spoke other languages. Of those aged 25 or older, 85.1% were high school graduates and 19.8% had a bachelor's degree.

The median household income in 2023 was $82,562, and the per capita income was $36,788. About 7.2% of families and 8.4% of the population were below the poverty line.

=== 2010 census ===
The 2010 United States census reported that Kingsburg had a population of 11,382. The population density was 4,024.3 inhabitants per square mile (1,553.8/km^{2}). The racial makeup of Kingsburg was 8,576 (75.3%) White, 62 (0.5%) African American, 146 (1.3%) Native American, 383 (3.4%) Asian, 21 (0.2%) Pacific Islander, 1,706 (15.0%) from other races, and 488 (4.3%) from two or more races. Hispanic or Latino of any race were 4,883 persons (42.9%).

The census reported that 11,300 people (99.3% of the population) lived in households, no one lived in non-institutionalized group quarters and 82 (0.7%) were institutionalized.

There were 3,822 households, 1,671 (43.7%) had children under the age of 18 living in them, 2,287 (59.8%) were opposite-sex married couples living together, 474 (12.4%) had a female householder with no husband present, 176 (4.6%) had a male householder with no wife present. There were 186 (4.9%) unmarried opposite-sex partnerships, and 19 (0.5%) same-sex married couples or partnerships. 770 households (20.1%) were one person and 398 (10.4%) had someone living alone who was 65 or older. The average household size was 2.96. There were 2,937 families (76.8% of households); the average family size was 3.41.

The age distribution was 3,368 people (29.6%) under the age of 18, 1,043 people (9.2%) aged 18 to 24, 2,899 people (25.5%) aged 25 to 44, 2,618 people (23.0%) aged 45 to 64, and 1,454 people (12.8%) who were 65 or older. The median age was 33.7 years. For every 100 females, there were 92.9 males. For every 100 females age 18 and over, there were 89.1 males.

There were 4,069 housing units at an average density of 1,438.7 units per square mile (555.5 units/km^{2}), of which 3,822 were occupied, 2,536 (66.4%) by the owners and 1,286 (33.6%) by renters. The homeowner vacancy rate was 2.8%; the rental vacancy rate was 6.5%. 7,518 people (66.1% of the population) lived in owner-occupied housing units and 3,782 people (33.2%) lived in rental housing units.

=== 1920 ===
In 1920, Armenians comprised 46% of the population of the town of Kingsburg, with 600 Armenian residents out of a total population of 1,316.

== Economy ==
For much of the town's history, the fields around Kingsburg were mostly grape vineyards which produce mainly raisins and table grapes; in 2002 a large surplus of raisins and grapes drove the price for these commodities down to an all-time low. Subsequently, farmers were forced to replant the fields with stone fruit, or (particularly on the west side of town) sell their land to developers to help cope with the rising population. Kingsburg was the headquarters of Sun-Maid Growers of California, a producer of raisins and other dried fruits. Fresno is the Corporate Headquarters. Kingsburg is home to the world's largest box of raisins, built by students at California State University, Fresno.

== Points of interest and events ==
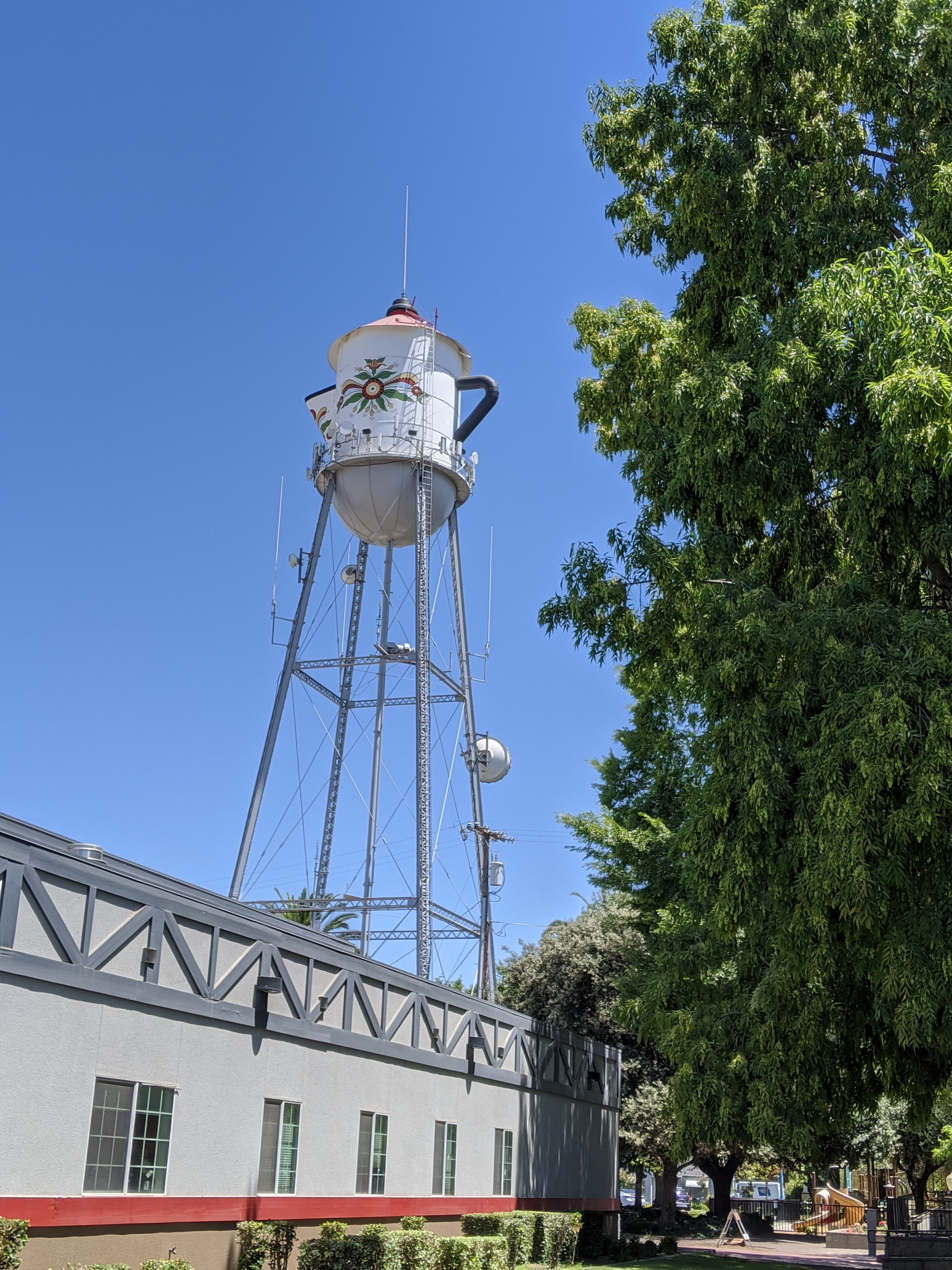
Swedish coffee pot water tower over Kingsburg

One of the notable landmarks in the community is the Kingsburg water tower, which is shaped like an antique Swedish coffee pot. The water tower was originally built in 1911 and was modified in 1985, inspired by a resident's visit to the similarly decorated water tower in Stanton, Iowa; the Kingsburg coffee pot water tower is 122 feet (37 m) tall, lit at night, and visible from SR 99. The Kingsburg pot is slightly larger than the Stanton one, at 60,000 and 50,000 US gal (230,000 and 190,000 L), respectively; the Stanton pot was taken down from its tower in 2015 and preserved, as it had been superseded by a larger water tower in the late 1990s.

The Swedish immigrant heritage of the community is principally preserved with festivals. The Kingsburg Swedish Festival, which is one of the biggest and best known festivals that bring people in from all over the country, is held annually during the third weekend in May. Activities include a Swedish pancake breakfast, a parade and the coronation of the Swedish Festival Queen. Many booths, rides and activities are set up all along the side of Downtown Kingsburg's Draper Street. This festival, which has traditionally been held on Friday, Saturday, and Sunday, was scheduled for only Saturday and Sunday in 2009 after the town's centennial due to the suffering economy, but in 2011, Thursday activities were added to the festival.

== Education ==
The community is in the Kingsburg Elementary Charter School District and the Kingsburg Joint Union High School District.

Kingsburg Elementary schools operate on a charter school system. Kingsburg's elementary school system is unique in that all students in Kindergarten through 8th grades will all go to the same schools together. The school year starts during the later weeks of August. Washington Elementary serves as a Kindergarten only school. First grade is at Roosevelt Elementary. Second and Third grades are at Lincoln Elementary. Fourth, Fifth, and Sixth grades are at Ronald Reagan Elementary. Seventh and Eighth grades are at Rafer Johnson Junior High School. Kingsburg High School serves as the community high school, and its district is separate from that of the elementary school system. The elementary school district also operates Central Valley Home School which serves as a supplement to traditional home schooling.

== Notable people ==
- Andrew Vorhees, American football offensive guard for the Baltimore Ravens of the National Football League (NFL). He played college football at USC.
- Tyler Bray, former quarterback for the University of Tennessee and NFL quarterback
- Monte Clark, American football player who served as head coach for two National Football League teams: the San Francisco 49ers and the Detroit Lions; born in Kingsburg
- Larry Hillblom, co-founder of DHL Worldwide Express
- Jimmy Johnson, cornerback for the San Francisco 49ers
- Rafer Johnson, Olympic gold-medal decathlete
- Slim Pickens and Easy Pickens, Western film actors, born in Kingsburg
- Kody Swanson, 2014, 2015 & 2017 United States Auto Club Silver Crown Series Champion
- Jake Woods, former Major League Baseball player
