= Traver, California =

Traver
- Unincorporated Community; Census Designated Place
- Location in Tulare County and the state of California

- Location in the United States
- Coordinates: 36°27′15″N 119°29′3″W
- Country: United States
- State: California
- County: Tulare

Area
  - Total: 0.670 sq mi (1.735 km^{2})
  - Land: 0.670 sq mi (1.735 km^{2})
  - Water: 0 sq mi (0 km^{2}) 0%
- Elevation: 289 ft (88 m)

Population (2020)
  - Total: 731
  - Density: 1,090/sq mi (421/km^{2})
- Time zone: UTC-8 (Pacific (PST))
  - Summer (DST): UTC-7 (PDT)
- ZIP code: 93673
- Area code: 559
- FIPS code: 06-80280
- GNIS feature ID: 0250599

Traver is a census-designated place (CDP) in Tulare County, California, United States. The population was 731 at the 2020 census, up from 713 at the 2010 census.

== Geography ==
Traver is located at 36°27′15″N 119°29′3″W (36.454300, -119.484182).

According to the United States Census Bureau, the CDP has a total area of 0.7 square miles (1.8 km^{2}), all land.

== Demographics ==
Historical population
Census	Pop.	Note	%±
2000	732		—
2010	713		−2.6%
2020	731		2.5%
U.S. Decennial Census; 1860–1870 1880-1890; 1900 1910 1920; 1930 1940 1950; 1960 1970 1980; 1990 2000 2010

Traver first appeared as a census designated place in the 2000 U.S. census.

=== 2020 ===
The 2020 United States census reported that Traver had a population of 731. The population density was 1,091.0 inhabitants per square mile (421.2/km^{2}). The racial makeup of Traver was 183 (25.0%) White, 4 (0.5%) African American, 15 (2.1%) Native American, 1 (0.1%) Asian, 0 (0.0%) Pacific Islander, 412 (56.4%) from other races, and 116 (15.9%) from two or more races. Hispanic or Latino of any race were 647 persons (88.5%).

The whole population lived in households. There were 173 households, out of which 95 (54.9%) had children under the age of 18 living in them, 98 (56.6%) were married-couple households, 12 (6.9%) were cohabiting couple households, 37 (21.4%) had a female householder with no partner present, and 26 (15.0%) had a male householder with no partner present. 12 households (6.9%) were one person, and 8 (4.6%) were one person aged 65 or older. The average household size was 4.23. There were 151 families (87.3% of all households).

The age distribution was 243 people (33.2%) under the age of 18, 97 people (13.3%) aged 18 to 24, 184 people (25.2%) aged 25 to 44, 149 people (20.4%) aged 45 to 64, and 58 people (7.9%) who were 65 years of age or older. The median age was 27.1 years. For every 100 females, there were 103.1 males.

There were 178 housing units at an average density of 265.7 units per square mile (102.6 units/km^{2}), of which 173 (97.2%) were occupied. Of these, 92 (53.2%) were owner-occupied, and 81 (46.8%) were occupied by renters.

=== 2010 ===
The 2010 United States census reported that Traver had a population of 713. The population density was 845.4 inhabitants per square mile (326.4/km^{2}). The racial makeup of Traver was 302 (42.4%) White, 1 (0.1%) African American, 22 (3.1%) Native American, 6 (0.8%) Asian, 2 (0.3%) Pacific Islander, 357 (50.1%) from other races, and 23 (3.2%) from two or more races. Hispanic or Latino of any race were 551 persons (77.3%).

The Census reported that 713 people (100% of the population) lived in households, 0 (0%) lived in non-institutionalized group quarters, and 0 (0%) were institutionalized.

There were 164 households, out of which 89 (54.3%) had children under the age of 18 living in them, 96 (58.5%) were opposite-sex married couples living together, 32 (19.5%) had a female householder with no husband present, 11 (6.7%) had a male householder with no wife present. There were 5 (3.0%) unmarried opposite-sex partnerships, and 0 (0%) same-sex married couples or partnerships. 19 households (11.6%) were made up of individuals, and 8 (4.9%) had someone living alone who was 65 years of age or older. The average household size was 4.35. There were 139 families (84.8% of all households); the average family size was 4.50.

The age distribution was 222 people (31.1%) under the age of 18, 89 people (12.5%) aged 18 to 24, 187 people (26.2%) aged 25 to 44, 138 people (19.4%) aged 45 to 64, and 77 people (10.8%) who were 65 years of age or older. The median age was 29.7 years. For every 100 females, there were 106.7 males. For every 100 females age 18 and over, there were 127.3 males.

There were 184 housing units at an average density of 218.2 per square mile (84.2/km^{2}), of which 95 (57.9%) were owner-occupied, and 69 (42.1%) were occupied by renters. The homeowner vacancy rate was 4.0%; the rental vacancy rate was 2.8%. 382 people (53.6% of the population) lived in owner-occupied housing units and 331 people (46.4%) lived in rental housing units.

=== 2000 ===
As of the census of 2000, the median income for a household in the CDP was $24,500, and the median income for a family was $22,750. Males had a median income of $17,188 versus $20,000 for females. The per capita income for the CDP was $7,642. About 23.5% of families and 33.2% of the population were below the poverty line, including 50.2% of those under age 18 and 7.4% of those age 65 or over.

== Politics ==
In the state legislature Traver is located in the 16th senatorial district, represented by Democrat Melissa Hurtado, and in the 33rd Assembly district, represented by Republican Alexandra Macedo.

In the United States House of Representatives, Traver is in California's 21st congressional district, represented by Democrat Jim Costa.

== Education ==
Traver is served by the Traver Joint Elementary School District and the Kingsburg Joint Union High School Districts. The latter operates Kingsburg High School.

== Notable people ==
- Paul Hurst (1888–1953), American film actor
