= Kingsburg Joint Union High School District =

School district in California, United States

The Kingsburg Joint Union High School District is a school district located in Kingsburg, Fresno County, California. Its comprehensive high school is Kingsburg High School.

In Fresno County, it includes Kingsburg. It extends into Tulare County, where it covers Traver.
