= Ackerman Charter School District =

School district in California, United States

- 13777 Bowman Rd. Auburn, California, 95603

District information
- Type: Public
- Grades: K–8
- NCES District ID: 0601680

Students and staff
- Teachers: 26.4
- Staff: 21.42

Other information
- Website: www.ackerman.k12.ca.us

The Ackerman Charter School District is a public charter school district in Auburn, California.

Its sole school campus, Bowman Charter School, is a public charter school for students in grades transitional-kindergarten through eighth grade. As of the 2016–17 school year, the Ackerman Charter School District serves approximately 587 students.
