= East Bay Innovation Academy =

Location
- 3400 Malcolm Avenue; Oakland, California 94605; United States; 37.7461°N 122.1414°W

Information
- School type: Public charter school
- Established: August 10, 2014
- School district: Oakland Unified School District
- Principal: Rachel Viegas
- Grades: 6th-8th Grades
- Website: eastbayia.org

The East Bay Innovation Academy is a public charter school within the Oakland Unified School District, whose educational approach emphasizes project-based learning. The school opened in 2014 as a middle school and later added high school grades, which occupied a separate campus, but the high school closed at the end of the 2025–2026 school year.

== History ==
The East Bay Innovation Academy was founded by Rochelle Benning and Laurie Jacobson Jones, was approved by Oakland Unified School District in October 2013, and opened in fall 2014 with 7th and 8th grades, after that adding a grade every year; from 2016, it included high school grades.

The COVID-19 pandemic led to a drop in enrollment at the school, and high school enrollment recovered less strongly than middle school enrollment. After academic performance at the high school fell in 2024–2025, the school's board of directors voted in May 2026 to close the high school at the end of that academic year. In November 2026, the school district board retroactively approved the decision, while noting that under state law the school should have sought its approval in advance, and that the closure was announced too late in the year for students to have a full choice of transfers.

== Demographics ==
As of 2022, East Bay Innovation Academy had around 630 students. 36% of them were hispanic, 24.8% were black, 20% were white, 11.7% were of two or more races, and 4.6% were Asian.

== Academics ==
East Bay Innovation Academy emphasizes project-based learning and science, technology, engineering, arts, and math. As of November 2026, its middle school test results are above average for the district in both mathematics and language arts.
