= Community Outreach Academy Elementary =

Charter school in California, United States

Coordinates: 38°40′15″N 121°23′12″W

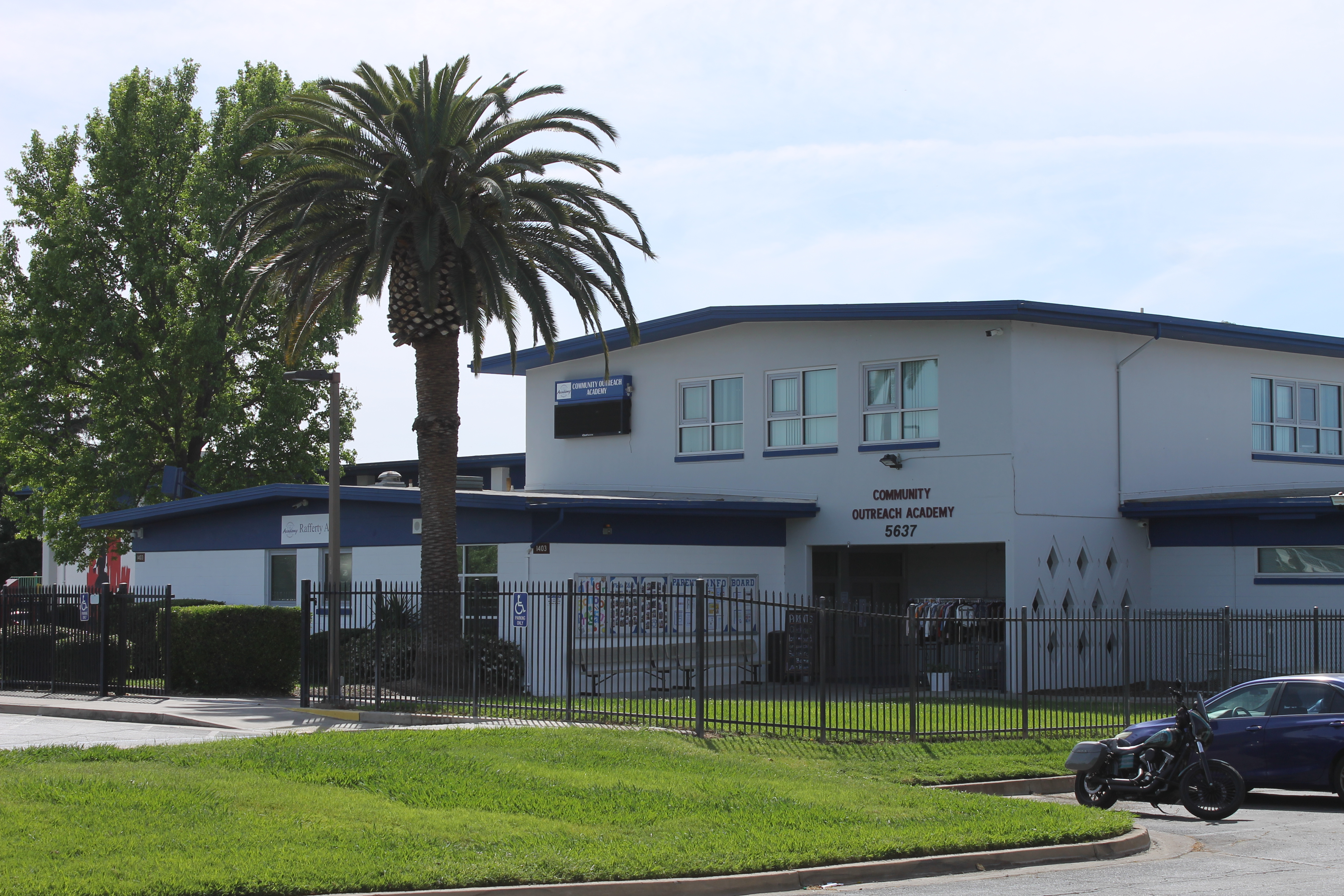
Community Outreach Academy Elementary School.

Community Outreach Academy Elementary is a Charter Elementary School located in McClellan Park, California, United States. Community Outreach Academy was founded in 2004 with one class per grade level. There were over 1200 students enrolled in the 2014–2015 school year.
