= Alternative in Action High School =

High school in California, United States

Alternatives in Action High School
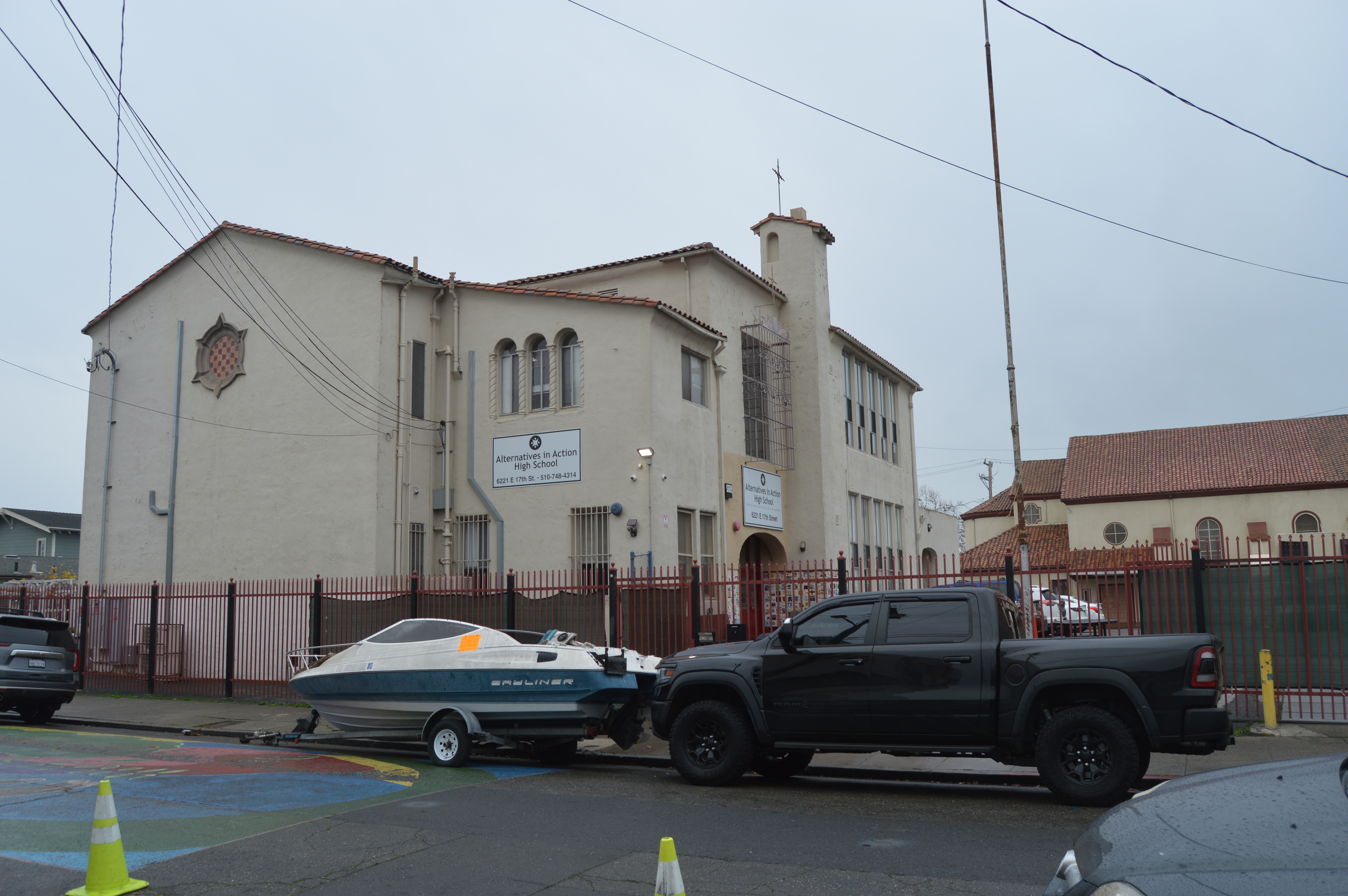

Location
- Oakland, California; United States; 37.76453518715726°N 122.19552307652013°W

Information
- Website: www.alternativesinaction.org

Alternatives in Action High School (formally known as the Bay Area School of Enterprise) is a charter high school in Oakland, California. It is the first youth-created charter high school in the United States, created by ten youth and two adults working in the afterschool program HOME Project to create a school for non traditional students. Entirely project-based, students participate in regular projects called "enterprises," including a major "enterprise" in humanities each year.

Originally founded in 2001, it relocated in 2004 as the student base grew, and again in 2008. In 2014, the school moved location from Alameda to Oakland and changed its name from the "Bay Area School of Enterprise" to the current "Alternatives in Action High School". It currently has an enrollment cap of 120 students, with just 93 students enrolled in the 2006–2007 school year.
