= University High School (Fresno) =

Location
- 2611 E. Matoian Way MS/UH134; Fresno, California 93740; United States; 36°48′36.9″N 119°44′37.1″W

Information
- Type: Charter High School
- Motto: Ad Astra Per Aspera (To the Stars Through Diligence)
- Established: 2000
- School district: Fresno Unified School District
- Principal: Jeffie Hickman
- Grades: 9 - 12
- Enrollment: 498 (2026-2027)
- Student to teacher ratio: 24:1
- Colors: Red, gold, black and white
- Mascot: Phoenix
- Website: www.uhsfresno.com

University High School (UHS) is a charter high school on the campus of California State University, Fresno, in Fresno, California. The school emphasizes college-prep academics and music. UHS opened in 2000 with Dr. Brad Huff as the founding head of school, with its first class graduating in 2004. At the end of the 2004–2005 school year, approximately 370 students were enrolled. The school now has a steady enrollment of about 480 students. University High School is chartered by the Fresno Unified School District and has special autonomy over its administration.

== Extracurricular activities ==
Academic teams include Academic Decathlon, Science Olympiad, Mock Trial, and Speech and Debate. The school is the ten-time champion in the Small School United States Academic Decathlon Online National Competition.
