= Kingsburg Elementary Charter School District =

School district in California, United States

Address
- 1310 Stroud Avenue Kingsburg, California, 93631; United States

District information
- Grades: K–8
- NCES District ID: 0619800

Students and staff
- Students: 2,116
- Teachers: 86.9 (FTE)
- Staff: 101.45 (FTE)
- Student–teacher ratio: 24.35:1

Other information
- Website: www.kesd.org

Kingsburg Elementary Charter School District is a school district based in Kingsburg, California in Fresno County.

== Schools ==
- Central Valley Home School (K-8)
- Washington Elementary School (K)
- Roosevelt Elementary School (1)
- Lincoln Elementary School (2-3)
- Reagan Elementary School (4-6)
- Rafer Johnson Junior High School (7-8)
