= Julian Charter School =

Coordinates: 33°4′44″N 116°35′41″W

Location
- 1704 Cape Horn; Julian, California 92036; United States

Information
- School type: Charter school
- Established: 1999
- School district: San Diego County Office of Education
- CEEB code: 052929
- Director: Jennifer Cauzza
- Teaching staff: 130 (as of 2009-10)
- Grades: K-12
- Enrollment: 1,833 (as of 2007-08)
- Student to teacher ratio: 18.3 (as of 2007-08)
- Slogan: "The right choice for personalized learning"
- Website: www.juliancharterschool.org

Julian Charter School (JCS) is a publicly funded independent study charter school sponsored by the San Diego County Office of Education. Although the main office is in Julian, California, JCS serves over 2,000 students across San Diego, Riverside, Orange, and Imperial counties. Established in 2000, the school serves approximately 2,100 students in kindergarten through grade 12 via homeschooling or small academy locations.

== History ==
Julian Charter School was first established in November 1999 as a Kindergarten through 12th grade non-classroom based charter. In 2000, the school began gradually taking ownership of curriculum. By the 2002-2003 school year, it became a fully incorporated charter school. The school is currently accredited by the Western Association of Schools and Colleges.

In the 2018-2019 school year, Julian Charter School possessed an 84% graduation rate.

== Campus ==
JCS has academy programs throughout the Southern California region. The programs are located in Temecula (previously Murrieta), Encinitas, Pine Valley, Alpine, and San Diego. The charter school system is limited to remain within the counties bordering the home county of San Diego.

== Curriculum ==
High school curriculum includes math, science, social studies and English. Online support is available in the form of asynchronous tutoring classes, discussion boards, and an online learning management system. High school students may choose either college prep (more rigorous classes preparing them for entrance into the UC and CSU system) or non-college prep course of study. For those students who have fallen behind their peers, Julian Charter School offers an onsite intensive program (INSITE) to help students succeed. In order to graduate, students must have 220 Carnegie Units, and must pass the CAHSEE (California High School Exit Exam). This school is publicly funded and fully credentialed to confer high school diplomas by the State of California and the San Diego County Office of Education.

=== Extracurricular activities ===
Some JCS schools have intramural sports programs for academy and home study students. Teams compete in flag football, soccer, and basketball.

=== Ranking ===
In 2019, Julian Charter School in Julian, California was ranked 669th in a ranking of California's 3,523 public schools.
