= Discovery Charter Preparatory =

Location
- 13570 Eldridge Ave. Sylmar, California 91342; United States
- Coordinates: 34.3190°N 118.4249°W

Information
- Type: College-preparatory, charter
- Principal: Karen Smith
- Grades: 9-12
- Enrollment: 230-250
- Student to teacher ratio: 18:1
- Color(s): Blue
- Website: discoveryprep.org

Discovery Charter Preparatory School (also known as Discovery Charter Preparatory No. 2, Discovery Prep, Discovery Charter, and DP) is a college preparatory charter school.

== History ==
Discovery Prep was founded by a group of parents who did not want to send their children to the local high schools, being the first startup charter high school in LAUSD. In 2003, the school added the 10th grade, with 11th grade added in 2004 and 12th grade in 2005. Since 2015, DP moved to a new site in Sylmar, California. On May 29, 2020, Citibank lent the school $350,000 to $1 million.

== Curriculum ==
Discovery Charter's curriculum is dedicated to college preparation and follows the Common Core standards. It includes Advanced Placement courses for history and foreign language and an advisory program for college preparation.

== Demographics ==
Discovery Charter enrolls approximately 250 students in grades 9-12 each year, with 88% of students eligible for free and reduced lunch. 20% of students are English Language Learners, 13% of students having disabilities, and 1% being foster youth.

Ethnicity	Students
Hispanic or Latino	97%
Two or more races	2%
Black	1%
Asian	0.4%
White	0.4%
