= Bitney College Preparatory High School =

Bitney Prep High School

Location
- 135 Joerschke Drive; Grass Valley, United States, California 95945
- Coordinates: 39°13′58″N 121°02′31″W

Information
- Type: Public 4-year
- Founded: 1998
- School board: Bitney College Prep. Charter Council
- Director: Jonathan Molnar
- Grades: 9-12
- Colours: Red, silver, and black
- Mascot: Bulldogs
- Website: http://www.bitneyprep.net/

Bitney Prep High School (formerly Bitney College Preparatory High School) is a high school located in Nevada County, California, United States.

== History ==
Founded in 1998 by the Bitney Springs Charter Council, this tuition-free charter school falls under the jurisdiction of the Nevada County Superintendent of Schools.

Bitney has moved several times. Below is a list of the sites Bitney has inhabited thus far.

- Bitney Springs Rd. 39°15′18″N 121°08′48″W 1999–2002
- Woolman Ln. 39°16′12″N 121°06′04″W 2002–2003
- 12338 McCourtney Road 39°12′00″N 121°05′35″W 2003–2007
- Ridge Rd. 39°14′20″N 121°03′16″W 2007–2009
- 135 Joerschke Dr. 39°13′58″N 121°02′31″W 2009–present

== Academics ==
For the school years of 2000–2001, 2001–02, 2002–03, and 2003–04, Bitney's API scores were the highest in Nevada County.

== Extracurricular activities and events ==
Athletics include Ultimate Frisbee.

Students are offered a variety of field trips:

- Wilderness Week
- Senior trip
- College tours

School dances are held at various times of the year, typically close to holidays.

- Halloween Dance (October)
- New Years Dance (January)
- Prom (May)

Since 2007, Bitney has hosted the annual Brain Buster Challenge, where teams from local schools have an opportunity to showcase their skills, knowledge, and spirit.
