= Hickman Community Charter School District =

School district in California, United States

Hickman Elementary School District

Location
- 13306 Fourth St., Area A Hickman, California 95323 United States

Other information
- Website: hickmanschools.org

Hickman Elementary School District is a public school district based in Stanislaus County, California, United States.
