= Ivy Academia =

Public charter school in Los Angeles, California

Coordinates: 34°10′40″N 118°36′55″W

Information
- School district: Los Angeles Unified School District
- Teaching staff: 48
- Enrollment: 952 (2014-2015)
- Website: www.iaecs.org

Ivy Academia is a public charter school in Los Angeles, California, United States, that specializes in education for the business world. The school has one campus: the Woodland Hills campus takes students from TK to 8th grade. Their mascot is a Puma and their executive director is Joe Herzog. Enrollment for the year 2014-2015 was 952 and all 48 teachers were appropriately assigned and fully credentialed in the subject area and for the students they were teaching. 93% of the class of 2014 graduated. Ivy Academia has closed on June 30 2026, becoming a part of Lashon Academy.

== Legal issues ==
On 5 April 2013, the founders of Ivy Academia Charter School were found guilty of embezzling $200,000 of public funds. Yevgeny Selivanov was sentenced to nearly five years in state prison, while his wife, Tatyana Berkovich, was sentenced to serve 45 days in county jail, perform 320 hours of community service and five years of probation. They had held positions as executive director, principal and president, but were placed on administrative leave in 2010 and resigned in 2011.

In 2016 the Los Angeles Unified School District was ordered to pay the school $7.1 million for failing to provide the school with rent-free classroom space.
