= Stockton Collegiate International Schools =

- Stockton, California 95202; United States

Information
- School type: Public Charter
- Established: September 7, 2010
- Principal: Josh Thom
- Faculty: 45+
- Grades: K – 12th
- Enrollment: 880
- Campus size: < 1,000 students
- Campus type: Urban
- Colors: Purple and Silver
- Mascot: Panther
- Information: (209)390-9861
- Website: stocktoncollegiate.org

Stockton Collegiate International Schools (SCIS) is a public charter school located in Stockton, California, serving grades kindergarten through 12th. Stockton Collegiate International Schools opened two public charter institutions on September 7, 2010, in downtown Stockton, CA. Stockton Collegiate offers three International Baccalaureate Programmes: Primary Years Programme (K-5), Middle Years Programme (6-10) and Diploma Program (11-12). Diploma Programme students sit for IB tests (at either Standard Level (SL) or Higher Level (HL)) each spring. This school is also one of the only schools in the world to be an IB school from k-12 grades.
