= Summit Preparatory Charter High School =

Location
- 890 Broadway Street; Redwood City, California 94063; USA
- 37°29′12″N 122°12′37″W

Information
- Type: College Preparatory; Public Charter High School
- Motto: To prepare a diverse student population for college and to be thoughtful, contributing members of society.
- Established: 2003
- School district: Sequoia Union High School District
- NCES School ID: 060228711981
- Faculty: 33
- Grades: 9–12
- Enrollment: 428 (2016-17)
- Campus: Small Building
- Colors: Blue, White
- Mascot: Huskies
- Website: summitprep.summitps.org

Summit Preparatory Charter High School, also known as Summit Prep, is a college preparatory and charter high school that was founded in 2003. It is the first school founded by the charter management organization (CMO) Summit Public Schools, which has five schools in the San Francisco Bay Area and two in Washington state. The school is part of the Sequoia Union High School District.

== Academics ==
Summit Prep follows the personalized, project-based learning curriculum known as Summit Learning. The typical class size is about 25 students or less to one teacher. Unlike many typical schools with an elective for one period a day, Summit spreads it throughout the school year. Called "Expeditions", it is now taken in two-week periods, which are broken up by six weeks of regular classes in between.

The school runs all students through same or very similar curricula, with all students taking a standardized curriculum and some students taking extra/alternative courses. 100% of Summit Prep graduates meet or exceed the University of California's A-G college entrance requirements. All Summit Prep students can take AP® courses (no minimum amount) and attempt at least one AP® exam by graduation. Additionally, all students take Spanish language courses during their four years.

== Statistics ==
=== Demographics ===
2015–2016

- 412 students: 222 Male (53.9%), 190 Female (46.1%)

Hispanic	White	Asian	Two or More Races	Filipino	African American	Pacific Islander	American Indian	Not Reported
2009 Base API	2013 Growth API	Growth in the API from 2009 to 2013						
826	845	19						

== Awards and recognition ==
Year after year, Summit Prep is named one of America's Best High Schools by U.S. News & World Report and is awarded a gold medal for college readiness. For 2017, Summit Preparatory Charter High is ranked 21st within California, and the AP® participation rate 100 percent. The student body makeup is 51 percent male and 49 percent female, and the total minority enrollment is 75 percent. Summit Prep was also named one of America's Most Challenging High Schools by the Washington Post for 2017.

Summit Prep was listed as the #132 high school in the country in Newsweek's 2011 America's Best Public High Schools and among the top three in Northern California. Newsweek counted Summit among the 10 Miracle High Schools for "taking students at all skill levels, from all strata, and turning out uniformly qualified graduates."

Summit Prep was named in the top 100 public high schools in the US and top 10 public high schools in California in the 2010 Newsweek ranking. It is one of five schools to which families are applying in the 2010 documentary Waiting for Superman.

== See also ==
- San Mateo County high schools
