= Yuba City Charter School =

Coordinates: 39.12839°N 121.61286°W

Location
- 256 Wilbur Ave; Yuba City, California 95991-9223; United States

Information
- School type: Public, Charter school
- School district: Yuba City Unified School District
- NCES District ID: 0643470
- Superintendent: Jaimes Ferriera
- CEEB code: 054393
- NCES School ID: 064347008658
- Principal: Jaimes Ferriera
- Grades: K-12
- Enrollment: 148
  - Kindergarten: 16
  - Grade 1: 12
  - Grade 2: 9
  - Grade 3: 6
  - Grade 4: 14
  - Grade 5: 8
  - Grade 6: 6
  - Grade 7: 13
  - Grade 8: 7
  - Grade 9: 6
  - Grade 10: 19
  - Grade 11: 13
  - Grade 12: 19
- Accreditation: Western Association of Schools and Colleges
- Website: www.yubacitycharter.com

Yuba City Charter School is a K-12 public school located in Yuba City, California. Yuba City Charter School is a college prep and CTE program that models and supports the development of good character while emphasizing rigorous academics and career preparation. The school is a student centered direct instruction model, and offers a student success program to help struggling students improve performance, skills, and credit recovery. Yuba City Charter is fully accredited by the Western Association of Schools and Colleges (WASC).

All students K-6 receive daily formal instruction in music, PE, and Spanish language. All core high school classes meet the University of California A-G requirements for admission to UC. The student-teacher ratio for K-3 is 20:1 In grades 4-6, classes are capped at 25. In grades 7-12, classes are capped at 28. These caps have been established to ensure small class sizes and to facilitate significantly greater individualized instruction than is available in other schools.

Yuba City Charter School also encourages community service and parent participation. YCCS has established a Parent Advisory Committee, and encourages all parents to join. Yuba City Charter School is a public charter school. Enrollment is open to all students without exception. The school is located at 256 Wilbur Ave. in Yuba City, near the Sutter County Fair Grounds. Yuba City Charter School strives for high academic achievement in a small-school atmosphere. YCCS believes that the small school environment paired with individualized instruction and service provides the best educational experience for all students.
