= PUC Schools =

Charter school operator in California

Coordinates: 34.1903°N 118.3218°W

PUC Schools is a charter school operator in Greater Los Angeles. It has its headquarters in Burbank. The charter school systems operates schools in northeast Los Angeles and the northeast San Fernando Valley.

== Schools ==
High schools:

- California Academy for Liberal Studies Early College High School (Los Angeles)
- Community Charter Early College High School (Lake View Terrace, Los Angeles)
- Early College Academy for Leaders and Scholars (eCALS) (Los Angeles)
- Lakeview Charter High School (San Fernando)
- Triumph Charter High School (Sylmar, Los Angeles)

Middle schools:

- California Academy for Liberal Studies Charter Middle School (Los Angeles)
- Community Charter Middle School (Lake View Terrace, Los Angeles)
- Excel Charter Academy (Lincoln Heights, Los Angeles)
- Lakeview Charter Academy (Lake View Terrace, Los Angeles)
  - Previously located in San Fernando
- Nueva Esperanza Charter Academy (San Fernando)
- Santa Rosa Charter Academy (Los Angeles)
- Triumph Charter Academy (Sylmar, Los Angeles)
  - Previously located in San Fernando

Elementary schools:

- Milagro Charter School (Lincoln Heights, Los Angeles)
- Community Charter Elementary School (Sylmar, Los Angeles)
