= Larchmont Charter School =

Public charter school in Los Angeles, California

Coordinates: 34.07872°N 118.32342°W

- Los Angeles, California

Information
- Type: Public charter school
- Established: September 2005
- School district: Los Angeles Unified School District
- Superintendent: Amy Held
- Grades: K–12
- Website: www.larchmontcharter.org

Larchmont Charter School is a public charter school located in Los Angeles, California, United States. Considered popular amongst parents in the entertainment industry and highly diverse, Larchmont is known for its high academic ranking and constructivist approach to learning, with one of the city's most selective high schools.

== History ==
Larchmont Charter School opened exclusively as an elementary school of 120 students in September 2005. Founded by Lindsay Sturman leading a core group of families frustrated with public education in Los Angeles, Larchmont's goal was to provide "an exceptional public education" via the charter school model. Over time, the school added more and more grades, until it had four campuses and went all the way through senior year of high school.

Since government funding alone does not pay for all of the school's needs, Larchmont fundraises via events like silent auctions, featuring performers including Jim Bianco. In 2016, Larchmont Charter High School graduated its first class of forty-three students, with former Larchmont board member and parent Mark Feuerstein giving the graduation address. Joshua Groban, associate justice of the Supreme Court of California, is another former board member of the school.

Though Larchmont has a reputation for being focused on arts and academics, with more limited athletics, Larchmont Charter's women's basketball team won a high school city championship in 2022.

== Campuses ==
Though named for the Larchmont neighborhood of Los Angeles, in which many of the school's founding families reside, none of Larchmont's five campuses are located in the neighborhood. Each of the five provides different grade levels, spanning kindergarten to twelfth grade.

- Wilshire (TK – 2nd grade) – 4900 Wilshire Blvd, Los Angeles, CA 90010
- Fairfax (TK – 4th grade) – 1265 N Fairfax Ave, West Hollywood, CA 90046
- Hollygrove@Selma (3rd grade – 4th grade) – 6611 Selma Ave, Los Angeles, CA 90028
- Selma (5th – 8th grade) – 6611 Selma Ave, Los Angeles, CA 90028
- La Fayette Park (9th – 12th grade) – 2801 W 6th St, Los Angeles, CA 90057

== Controversies ==
=== Homelessness and crime ===
As an inner-city school, Larchmont has gained attention for the homeless encampments outside its walls, in particular near its Selma campus. During the 2022 Los Angeles mayoral election, Los Angeles City Councilmember Joe Buscaino held a press conference outside Larchmont's Selma campus to announce his plan to ban encampments within one thousand feet of schools, across the street from a large and expanding homeless encampment. During the press conference, a clash broke out between left-wing protesters and Buscaino's press manager, causing controversy and leading to a call for condemnation by Larchmont alumnus and fellow mayoral candidate Alex Gruenenfelder. Buscaino's policy was opposed by the board of the Los Angeles Times, but supported by the Los Angeles Daily News.

Crime near the school's campuses has also led to panic. Alongside Hollywood High School, Larchmont was forced to go on lockdown in January 2022 due to a person with a gun in a nearby tent, and February 2022 brought another lockdown as an armed standoff ended with a suspect committing suicide.

In October 2024, The Korea Times reported that two Korean students were assaulted by a group of six white students at one of Larchmont's elementary school campuses. The parents of the victims said in an interview that the attackers allegedly shouted things like "They don’t speak English, someone needs to interpret for them," and that the school downplayed the incident.

=== Lottery system ===
By California law, students are admitted to Larchmont through a lottery system. This policy has been discussed at length for whether or not it lives up to its goal of creating diversity, while the lottery-based Larchmont has been described as "nearly impossible to get into." The school received controversy for an early policy of allowing parents to bypass the lottery in exchange for special skills or a significant volunteer commitment. Though the policy was legal, openly discussed with regulators, and ended after just one year, Larchmont received criticism from opponents of charter schools for the practice.
