= River Valley Charter School =

High school in California, United States

Coordinates: 32°51′11.71″N 116°56′26.52″W

River Valley Charter School is a charter junior high/high school established in 1996 in Lakeside, California. It is a part of the Lakeside Union School District, LUSD. It is based on a partial-independent study program, in which most students attend two class days per week. As much as 50% of the River Valley students come from home-school backgrounds. River Valley has been fully accredited by the Western Association of Schools and Colleges since 2002.

== Academics ==
River Valley Charter School has a history of high-academic performance. For several years, River Valley High has had the highest API (Academic Performance Index) score in its county. In 2015, the score was 932, placing the school in the top 10% for the statewide rankings and being ranked the 94th overall school in the country.

Core classes include: Math, Science, History and English.

== Extra-Curricular activities ==
Extracurricular activities include: Spanish I, II, III, and AP Spanish, Girls and Boys Soccer, Track, and Cross Country teams, Swim team, Girls Volleyball, Associated Student Body, Visual Arts, Photography, creative writing, and Yearbook.

== Rankings ==
US News 2010 Best High Schools: Ranked Silver GreatSchools.org: Among only a few schools in California to receive a distinguished GreatSchools Rating of 10 out of 10 with an average Parent Rating of 5 out of 5 stars, based on reviews from 22 parents. Newsweek America's Top High Schools 2015: Ranked 94th. As of 2021, River Valley Charter School is ranked as the #8 school in the San Diego, CA Metro Area High Schools.
