= Grossmont Union High School District =

School district in California, United States

Location
- El Cajon, California; United States
- Coordinates: 32°47′23″N 116°57′45″W

District information
- Type: Public
- Grades: 9–12 and adult education
- Established: 1920; 106 years ago
- Superintendent: Dr. Kirsten Vital Brulte
- Enrollment: 21,697 (2024)

Other information
- Governing board: Gary Woods; Jim Kelly; Chris Fite; Robert Shield; Scott Eckert
- Website: www.guhsd.net

Grossmont Union High School District (GUHSD) is a public school district based in eastern San Diego County, California. It serves high school, adult school, and Regional Occupational Program (ROP) students in the cities of El Cajon, Lemon Grove, and Santee; the unincorporated communities of Alpine, Casa de Oro, Crest, Dehesa, Dulzura, Jamul, Lakeside, Mount Helix, Rancho San Diego, and Spring Valley; most of La Mesa, and parts of San Diego.

Formed in June 1920, the union high school district is overseen by a five-member governing board and operates 13 high schools (nine regular, three charter, and one continuation); a regional occupational program (ROP); and special education and adult education services. The day-to-day operations are managed by the superintendent, who is appointed by the board.

Grossmont Union High School District utilizes a strategic plan that includes a mission statement, district guidelines, core values, and annual goals and objectives. The district's schools are accredited by the Western Association of Schools and Colleges (WASC).

Four of the district's high schools—Helix, Mount Miguel, Santana, and Valhalla (twice)—have been recognized as California Distinguished School by the California Department of Education.

In March 2001, the district and two of its high schools—Santana and Granite Hills—made nationwide headlines in the US when, in a span of seventeen days, a total of two students were killed and twenty students and two teachers were wounded when two students, in separate incidents, opened fire at their schools.

In February 2025, the district made news as the first high school district in San Diego County to eliminate all school librarians. The decision, approved by GUHSD Trustees Scott Eckert, Gary C. Woods, Jim Kelly, and Rob Shield, was opposed by many East County parents, teachers, and students.

== History ==
Grossmont Union High School District was formed in 1920 and its first high school, Grossmont High School, built in 1922, served the cities of La Mesa and El Cajon. At the time of its construction, this region of eastern San Diego County was much more rural and isolated from the city of San Diego. La Mesa and El Cajon were, in fact, only newly incorporated cities, as of 1912. Grossmont remained the region's only high school for 30 years. In 1939, Grossmont High School was rebuilt. Beginning in 1952, the school district underwent an expensive, rapid period of development to accommodate for the suburbanization and consequent growth in population of the area. Six more schools were established in a period of ten years. A further four schools were subsequently built. Most recently, the district opened Steele Canyon High School in Spring Valley in 2000.

=== CARD ===
There are many military families present in the school district. Marine Corps Air Station Miramar and Marine Corps Recruit Depot San Diego are both nearby. North of San Diego is Marine Corps Base Camp Pendleton.

In October 1982, the San Diego Committee Against Registration and the Draft (CARD), later renamed the Committee Opposed to Militarism and the Draft, sought to purchase advertising space from five student newspapers published by high schools within the district. CARD, a non-profit organization, provides counseling services to young men and women on alternatives to military service. Members include both students and non-students. The advertisement was intended to provide information to students on such alternatives.

Depicting a ghost-like figure, stating "Don't Let the Draft Blow You Away!" the advertisement contained the following statements:

Know Your Rights Know Your Choices!

If the draft starts tomorrow, you could be in boot camp 11 days later.

Call or Write Committee Against Registration and the Draft

In November 1982, Acting Assistant Superintendent Bob King issued a directive instructing that all principals reject CARD's requests. In January 1983, CARD filed an administrative claim with the governing board so as to reverse the Superintendent's decision. The board rejected the claim in February and on March 16, 1983, CARD filed a lawsuit against the board, alleging that the board's actions and policies had deprived CARD of its rights under the First and Fourteenth Amendments to the United States Constitution.

In June 1986, the Ninth Circuit Court of Appeals stated that the question of voluntary and compulsory military service is a controversial political issue, ruling that if a school establishes a forum for one side to prevent its views, it must provide equal access to opponents. CARD v. GUHSD has since become a major legal precedent with regards to military recruitment. In the nine Western states within the boundaries of the Ninth Circuit, the ruling can be cited by counter-militarism activists in order to demand the opportunity to address students in public schools, an opportunity previously granted solely to recruiters and the Selective Service System. In addition, the Court's ruling clarifies the legal definition of school newspapers, mainly as "limited public forums." The governing board had argued that the newspapers were "non-public" and therefore completely under its control.

=== March 2001 school shootings ===
On March 5, 2001, Charles "Andy" Williams, 15, shot and killed two students and wounded 13 others at Santana High School in Santee. On August 15, 2002, Williams was sentenced to 50 years to life in prison for the shootings. His defense attorneys had filed a 200-page report arguing for more lenient sentencing. The report included excerpts from Williams' interview with University of California, Davis psychiatrist Dr. Charles Scott. Williams told Scott that taunting and bullying by his peers had depressed him and led him to consider suicide. He also told Scott that he thought someone would stop him from bringing his father's .22 calibre gun to school.

Less than three weeks later, on March 22, 2001, Jason Hoffman, 18, armed with a .22 calibre handgun and a 12-gauge pump-action shotgun, shot and wounded three students and two teachers at Granite Hills High School in nearby El Cajon. The shooting ended in a gun battle with local police near the campus administration building. Before the incident, Hoffman allegedly made references to the 1999 massacre at Columbine High School in Littleton, Colorado. Hoffman reportedly had a history of mental illness and discipline problems and was ordered to attend an anger management class several years before. The San Diego Union-Tribune also reported that Hoffman had been rejected by the Navy a day before the shooting because he was 25 pounds overweight, had a skin condition and had been convicted of assault. After pleading guilty to one count of premeditated attempted murder and five counts of assault, Hoffman hanged himself in his segregation cell at the county jail on October 29, 2001.

=== 2006 immigration policy protests ===
Students throughout San Diego County joined the nationwide protests over immigration policies in March 2006. Hundreds of students walked out of El Cajon Valley High School and marched in the streets carrying signs and flags. Granite Hills High School went into morning lockdowns to prevent students from coming into contact with marchers from the neighboring school. Student walkouts also occurred at Mount Miguel High School and Monte Vista High School.

GUHSD sent out an automated phone message to parents, urging them to keep their children at school. The bilingual message warned that students who are arrested could face a $250 fine. The district cautioned parents that any students who missed class or left the campus without permission would be marked truant and receive zero grades.

=== 2025 retaliation investigation ===
In June 2025, the San Diego Union-Tribune released school board trustee text messages and emails (obtained through the Public Records Act) showing that GUHSD Board President Gary C. Woods advocated for eliminating the librarians. In the messages, Woods wrote that the district should "end DEI" and "RIF!" (reduction in force) school staff. The messages also showed that Woods communicated with Chief of Staff Jerry Hobbs and Trustees Jim Kelly and Scott Eckert to advocate for the elimination of all school site librarians as a way to control the purchase of "woke" books.

These messages from Woods were cited by a local parent-led group, East County Voices for Public Education, as evidence that Woods attempted to bypass California Education Code, which requires schools to provide "accurate and inclusive" curriculum.

The private messages include a screenshot showing the name of a district librarian who had donated a small amount of personal funds to a candidate who ran against Scott Eckert in the 2024 election. This librarian's position was eliminated in May 2025, leading East County Voices for Public Education to note that the elimination could be seen as retaliation.

=== 2025 alleged Brown Act violations ===
GUHSD Trustee text messages and emails, released by the San Diego Union-Tribune in June, 2025, also drew public attention for the fact that some of the private conversations included a majority of GUHSD Trustees. California's Brown Act bans public officials, including school board trustees from gathering as a majority, or "quorum," to discuss business outside of a properly noticed public meeting. This ban extends to text messages and emails that include a quorum.

According to the Union-Tribune:

"In private messages obtained by The San Diego Union-Tribune via public records request, a select group of trustees and their advisers arranged for allies to be named to key positions and plotted against administrators they believed disloyal."

In response, the Grossmont Education Association (GEA), which represents all teachers in the district, sent a letter to district demanding the trustees reverse their May 2025 decision to eliminate 61 school staff positions, including their vote to eliminate all teacher-librarians in the school district. According to GEA attorney Fern Steiner:

"The communications show no concern for the public having the right to know the business being conducted and no concern for the certificated and all employees of the district."

In a follow-up interview, GUHSD spokesperson Collin McGlashen refuted the evidence that the trustees had violated the Brown Act or targeted district librarians. McGlashen told the Union-Tribune, "It is worth noting that the only specific communication referenced in the letter ('a text exhorting "RIF, RIF, RIF"') does not appear to involve a majority of governing board members."

The message McGlashen referred to was on a text thread between GUHSD Trustee Gary Woods, Chief of Staff Jerry Hobbs, and two individuals whose names the district has not disclosed. The full text read: "Goal 4: Deal with Collin. Once and for all. Overarching goal: RIF RIF RIF!!!"

=== 2025 investigations into Trustee Scott Eckert ===
In July 2025, the San Diego Union-Tribune published an investigation into allegations that Trustee Scott Eckert, who represents the city of La Mesa, as well as the Mt. Helix and Casa de Oro areas, benefitted from a "ghost candidate" that split his opponent's vote in the 2024 election. According to documentation on file with the San Diego County Registrar of Voters, San Diego Attorney John Howard paid at least $1,000 to file a candidate statement for trustee candidate Marsha Christman.

That area of the school district ("Area 2") has historically elected a progressive candidate to the GUHSD school board. In her candidate statement, Christman positioned herself as a progressive candidate and an alternative to progressive frontrunner Jay Steiger. As the Union-Tribune noted, Christman did no campaigning after filing that statement, and she never recorded any campaign donations or expenses with the County.

This finding raised suspicions that Howard paid to run Christman as a "ghost" or "fake" candidate to draw votes away from Steiger. Howard has denied any knowledge of Christman or the payment, signed with his name, to the Registrar of Voters.

On November 5, 2024, Eckert won the GUHSD Trustee seat, receiving 1,123 more votes than Steiger. Christman, meanwhile received 3,914 votes.

The Union-Tribune also reported that Attorney John Howard had an active contract with GUHSD at the time of the 2024 election. Howard's law firm, J.W. Howard Attorneys, was contracted to provide legal services for the school district. In 2024, Howard was also copied on messages from Chief of Staff Jerry Hobbs (a former employee at JW Howard Attorneys) and GUHSD Trustees regarding campaign strategy in 2024.

The Union-Tribune also reported that in July 2024, Howard personally donated $2,500 to Scott Eckert's campaign, according to campaign finance documents on file with the San Diego County Registrar of Voters. On Feb. 27, 2025, Eckert voted to extend the district's contract with JW Howard Attorneys. As the Union-Tribune reported:

"Seven months after receiving Howard's donation and three months after winning election to the Grossmont school board, Eckert voted along with [Jim] Kelly to keep Howard's contract as the other trustees sought to terminate it."

By accepting Howard's donation and then voting in favor of extending a contract with Howard, Eckert may have violated California's Political Reform Act ("Pay-to-Play Limits and Prohibitions") Section 84308:

"Section 84308 also prohibits certain officials, including local elected officials, from taking part in an entitlement for use proceeding if the official has received a contribution exceeding $500 from a party or participant in the proceeding within the preceding 12 months."

Eckert's ties to John Howard drew criticism from community members and fueled an official campaign to recall Eckert from office. On July 25, 2025, local parents led a press conference calling for the resignations of GUHSD Trustees Scott Eckert, Gary C. Woods, Jim Kelly, and Rob Shield.

=== 2025 discrimination lawsuit ===
After an incident at Santana High, in which a student left school grounds and went missing for five days, during which she was trafficked, Grossmont Union High School District started its own investigation three years after the incident. A former special-ed director, Rose Tagnesi, filed a lawsuit against the Grossmont Union High School District and further settled for $700K. According to her lawsuit, her targeting during that investigation was part of a broader "discriminatory campaign" by the board majority. According to the San Diego Union-Tribune, the Grossmont Union High School District had already been accused of having an anti-LGBTQ+ majority on the school board following the banning of LGBTQ+ books and the termination of a contract with a mental health provider because it offered specialized services to LGBTQ+ individuals.

=== Charter schools ===
In 1998, Helix High School became the district's first charter high school. Steele Canyon became the second charter school on July 1, 2007. Liberty Charter High School was founded in 2008. Although affiliated with GUHSD, Helix High School has its own independent school board. Liberty Charter is operated by Literacy First inc.

== Schools ==
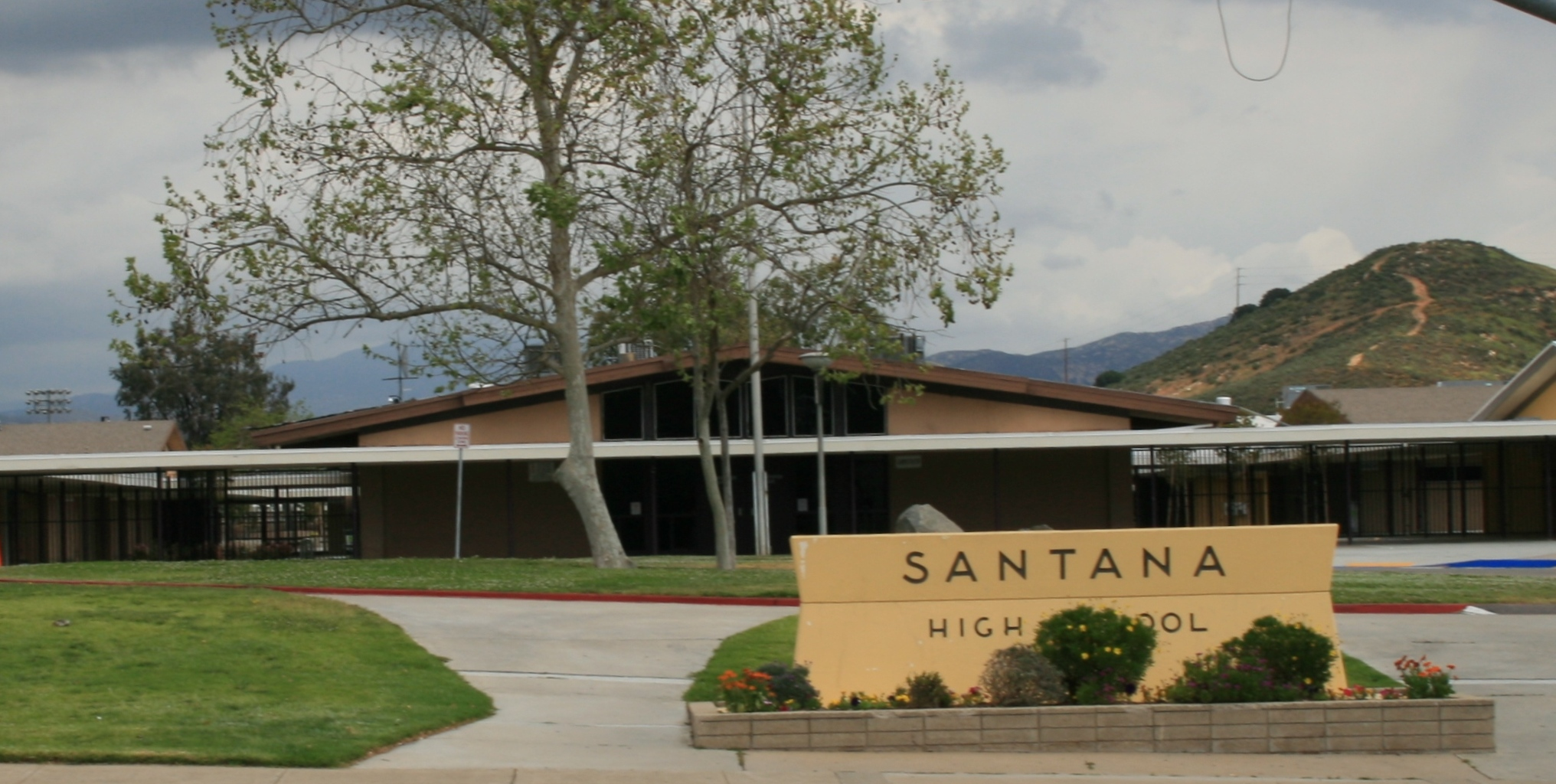
Santana High School

The GUHSD has the following thirteen high school campuses (listed in order of year opened):

- 1922 – Grossmont High School, La Mesa/El Cajon
- 1952 – Helix High School (Originally a member now a Sponsored charter), La Mesa
- 1955 – El Cajon Valley High School, El Cajon
- 1957 – Mount Miguel High School, Spring Valley
- 1959 – El Capitan High School, Lakeside
- 1960 – Granite Hills High School, El Cajon
- 1961 – Monte Vista High School, Spring Valley
- 1965 – Santana High School, Santee
- 1972 – Chaparral High School (continuation), El Cajon
- 1974 – Valhalla High School, El Cajon
- 1987 – West Hills High School, Santee
- 2000 – Steele Canyon High School (charter), Spring Valley
- 2008 – Liberty Charter High School (sponsored charter), La Mesa
- 2015 – IDEA Center High School (alternative), El Cajon

== Programs and services ==
In addition to its high schools, the districts operates:

- Grossmont Middle College High School, Grossmont College, El Cajon
- East County Career Center
- East County Regional Education Center (ECREC)
- East County Regional Occupational Program (ROP)
- Foothills Adult School
- Grossmont Work Training Center
- REACH Academy (Continuation)/ Frontier (special education)
- Viking Center (special education – severely disabled)
- Work Training Center (Job skills training for special needs students)

== Governing board and superintendent ==
Governing board

- Jim Kelly, member (elected 2002)
- Robert Shield, member (elected 2006)
- Gary Woods, member (elected 2008)
- Chris Fite, member (elected 2016)
- Scott Eckert, member (elected 2024)

Superintendent

- Jo Ann Smith, superintendent (appointed 1990)

Smith was an internal hire.

- Thomas Godley, superintendent (appointed 1997)

Godley was a former superintendent of the San Marino Unified School District.

- Granger Ward, Superintendent (appointed 1999)

Ward worked as an administrator for New York City Schools.

- Terry Ryan, Superintendent (appointed 2003)

Ryan worked for the County Office.

- Robert Collins, superintendent (appointed 2007)

Collins had worked 39 years for LA Unified.

- Ralf Swenson, superintendent (appointed 2010)

Swenson was the superintendent of the Nevada Joint Union High School District in metropolitan Sacramento.

=== Tolerance policies ===
In the mid-1980s, sophomore Karen Davis requested that a district policy preventing girls from participating in "contact sports" (e.g. wrestling, football and boxing) be changed. It is "outright discrimination," Davis argued, to exclude any capable girl from playing any particular sport. Initially, the board rejected her request, voting 4–1 in favor of prohibiting Davis from playing on the Helix High School football team. Davis threatened to sue the board and, in September 1985, the state legislative council ruled that she should be allowed to play on the team. Finally, the board changed the policy to allow girls to try out for contact sports.

In 1999, the school board approved expanding the district's anti-discrimination policy to include sexual orientation.

In 2002, the GUHSD board decided to censor a film promoting tolerance of gay, lesbian and bisexual students.

In October 2007, Governor Schwarzenegger signed an anti-discrimination law aiming to provide protection for gay, lesbian and transgender students. The following month, four of the five board members joined a federal lawsuit that challenged the new state education law as "unconstitutionally vague and a violation of privacy rights."

The school board publicly voted in 2008 on a resolution endorsing Proposition 8 which would effectively ban same-sex marriage in California. The Governing Board voted 4–0 with 1 abstention by board member Hoy (who cited that the proposition had nothing to do with schools) to endorse the amendment of the California State Constitution.

Many students, teachers and community members spoke out against the boards action during the public comment period. They felt the message they were sending to students was one of discrimination and felt the support of Prop 8 had nothing to do with the education and students of the district. Grossmont Union School board was the only school board in the State to make such a resolution in support of Prop. 8

=== Vote to cancel SDYS contract ===
In 2023, the GUHSD Trustees Jim Kelly, Gary C. Woods, and Rob Shield voted to cancel a district contract for licensed counseling services provided by San Diego Youth Services (SDYS). The trustees chose to cancel this contract after a single public comment was made highlighting that SDYS's resources included therapuetic care for LGBTQ students. This decision was opposed by parents and educators in the district who supported the SDYS contract and pointed out that SDYS is required, by law, to serve all communities.

In his comments advocating for the cancellation of the contract with SDYS, GUHSD Trustee Gary C. Woods claimed that SDYS's services were not in line with "East County values."

SDYS was replaced by counseling services from Wellness Together, which is also required to offer inclusive counseling therapy.

== Discipline ==
	Suspensions				Expulsions			
School Year	2005–06	2006–07	2007–08	2008–09	2005–06	2006–07	2007–08	2008–09
Chaparral								
El Cajon Valley				648				25
El Capitan				189				8
Granite Hills		205	229	289		18	11	16
Grossmont				357				26
Helix				281				8
Monte Vista				390				17
Mount Miguel		498	367	418		19	19	27
Santana				225				8
Steele Canyon								
Valhalla				246				8
West Hills		180	175	234		8	16	17
Total	4230	3656	3109	3856	186	182	195	230

== Advanced placement ==
Most high schools in the district offer advanced placement (AP) courses. The percent of students in AP courses varies from school to school.

School	Total number of AP courses	Percent of students in AP courses
Phoenix	N/A	N/A
El Cajon Valley	7	12.3%
Mount Miguel	6	12.4%
El Capitan	10	24.1%
Monte Vista	12	27.2%
Valhalla	11	38.9%
Chaparral	N/A	N/A
Steele Canyon	8	28.5%
Grossmont	12	22.4%
Granite Hills	9	19.2%
Santana	9	22.0%

== Demographic profile ==
With 2,300 employees and hundreds more hourly employees, GUHSD is the largest employer of eastern San Diego County. GUHSD is also very ethnically diverse. Of the 24,000 students that attend schools in the district, approximately 53% are white, while 47% identify as one or more of the following: Latino, African-American, Asian, Filipino, Pacific Islander, and Native American. At the school level, these statistics change significantly. In fact, some schools comprise minority-majority populations. While non-Hispanic whites represent over 75% of the Santana High School student body, they make up only 16% at Mount Miguel High School.

A 1992 UC Santa Barbara-University of British Columbia-University of Edinburgh study examined the extent and impact of ethnic and racial segregation on the achievement gap in California's six largest school districts, including GUHSD, during the 1988–1989 school year. Within these districts, the study found that GUHSD had the highest concentration of white students, while San Francisco Unified School District and Los Angeles Unified School District had the lowest. The study suggested that such widespread segregation may have led to significant differences in achievement levels across schools and among ethnic groups.

Average class size in the district varies by grade level, subject area and school. The district, however, reports that it provides staffing resources at a ratio of 35 students to one teacher. Based on audited financial statements for the 2006–2007 fiscal year, the district spent an average of $9,030 to educate each student.

Socioeconomic backgrounds vary across student populations as well. The district reports relatively large percentages of socioeconomically disadvantaged students at several schools. During the 2005–2006 school year, 50% of students were considered disadvantaged at Mount Miguel High School, while 62%, 48% and 42% were deemed so at El Cajon Valley High School, Helix High School and Monte Vista High School, respectively. Valhalla High School had the lowest proportion of socioeconomically disadvantaged students, with only 12%.

Chaparral High School is the main continuation/alternative school of the district. Comprehensive schools may refer students to Chaparral for reasons involving poor attendance, lack of academic success and/or behavioral issues.

== Feeder school districts ==
- Cajon Valley Union School District
- La Mesa-Spring Valley School District
- Lakeside Union School District
- Lemon Grove School District
- Santee School District

== Notable alumni ==
- Khalif Barnes, Mount Miguel, 2000, National Football League offensive tackle, Jacksonville Jaguars
- Leon Bender, Santana, 1992, National Football League defensive lineman, Oakland Raiders
- Reggie Bush, Helix, 2002, National Football League running back, New Orleans Saints
- Nick Cannon, Monte Vista, 1998, rapper and actor
- Chuck Cecil, Helix, former National Football League strong safety for the Green Bay Packers, Arizona Cardinals and Houston Oilers, Currently safeties and nickelbacks coach for the Tennessee Titans
- Eric Close, Valhalla, 1985, actor
- Sharon Davis, Santana, 1972, former First Lady of California
- Karl Dorrell, Helix, 1981, college football head coach, University of California, Los Angeles Bruins
- Terry Forster, Santana, 1970, retired Major League Baseball relief pitcher, Chicago White Sox, Los Angeles Dodgers
- Geoff Geary, Grossmont, 1994, Major League Baseball relief pitcher, Philadelphia Phillies
- Brian Giles, Granite Hills, 1989, Major League Baseball right fielder, San Diego Padres and previously Cleveland Indians and Pittsburgh Pirates, brother of Marcus Giles
- Marcus Giles, Granite Hills, 1996, Major League Baseball second baseman, San Diego Padres, brother of Brian Giles
- Dennis Hopper, Helix, 1954, actor and film director
- Jimmie Johnson, Granite Hills, 1993, NEXTEL Cup Champion
- David Leisure, Grossmont, 1968, actor, Empty Nest and fictional Isuzu spokesman Joe Isuzu
- Greg Louganis, Valhalla, 1976, former four-time Olympic gold medalist in diving
- Mark Malone, El Cajon Valley, 1976, sportscaster and former National Football League quarterback, Pittsburgh Steelers, San Diego Chargers, and New York Jets
- Kevin McCadam, El Capitan, 1997, Virginia Tech, National Football League, Atlanta Falcons, Carolina Panthers
- Glen Morgan, El Cajon Valley, television producer, writer, and film director, often with business partner James Wong
- Ellen Ochoa, Grossmont, 1975, astronaut
- Mary Jo Ondrechen, Mount Miguel, 1970, scientist, educator, community activist
- Hayden Penn, Santana, 2002, Major League Baseball pitcher, Baltimore Orioles
- Julia Schultz, Granite Hills, 1997, model and actress
- Brian Sipe, Grossmont, former National Football League MVP quarterback, Cleveland Browns and United States Football League New Jersey Generals and Jacksonville Bulls
- Alex Smith, Helix, National Football League quarterback, San Francisco 49ers
- Shane Spencer, Granite Hills, 1990, Nippon Professional Baseball outfielder, Hanshin Tigers and previously Major League Baseball New York Yankees, Toronto Blue Jays, Texas Rangers, Cleveland Indians, and New York Mets
- Stephen Strasburg, West Hills, 2006 the "most-hyped pick in draft history" selected first overall in the 2009 Major League Baseball draft by the Washington Nationals
- Frederick W. Sturckow, Grossmont, 1978, astronaut
- Jim Tatum, Santana High School, 1985 drafted by San Diego Padres
- Bill Walton, Helix, 1970, sportscaster and former National Basketball Association Hall of Fame center, Portland Trail Blazers and San Diego Clippers (now the Los Angeles Clippers)
- James Wong, El Cajon Valley, television producer, writer and film director, often with business partner Glen Morgan

== See also ==
- List of school districts in California by county
- List of school districts in San Diego County, California
