= Santee School District =

School district in California, United States

Address
- 9625 Cuyamaca Street Santee, California, 92071; United States
- Coordinates: 32.853135°N 116.982907°W

District information
- Type: Public
- Grades: K–8
- Superintendent: Dr. Kristin Baranski
- Schools: 9 K - 8 schools 1 K - 6 school
- NCES District ID: 0635880

Students and staff
- Students: 6,482 (2020–2021)
- Teachers: 273.08 (FTE)
- Staff: 336.23 (FTE)
- Student–teacher ratio: 23.74:1

Other information
- Website: www.santeesd.net

Santee School District (Santee Elementary School District) is the district that governs all public elementary schools in Santee, California. The two high schools in Santee, Santana and West Hills, are part of Grossmont Union High School District.

== Schools ==
- Cajon Park Elementary School (K-8)
- Carlton Hills Elementary School (K-8)
- Carlton Oaks Elementary School (K-8)
- Chet F. Harritt Elementary School (K-8)
- Hill Creek Elementary School (K-8)
- Pepper Drive School (K-8)
- PRIDE Academy School (K-8)
- Rio Seco Elementary School (K-8)
- Sycamore Canyon Elementary School (K-6)
- Santee Alternative School (Home Schooling)

=== Closed Schools ===
Santee School, the first school built in Santee, was closed in 2003.

=== Info ===
Santee School District has been a successful district ever since it started with its only school, which was Santee School. Some schools were opened to be known as overflow schools, but later became regular schools. Overflow schools were only meant to hold up to 500 students.
