= Jack Browning =

American football player (born 2001)

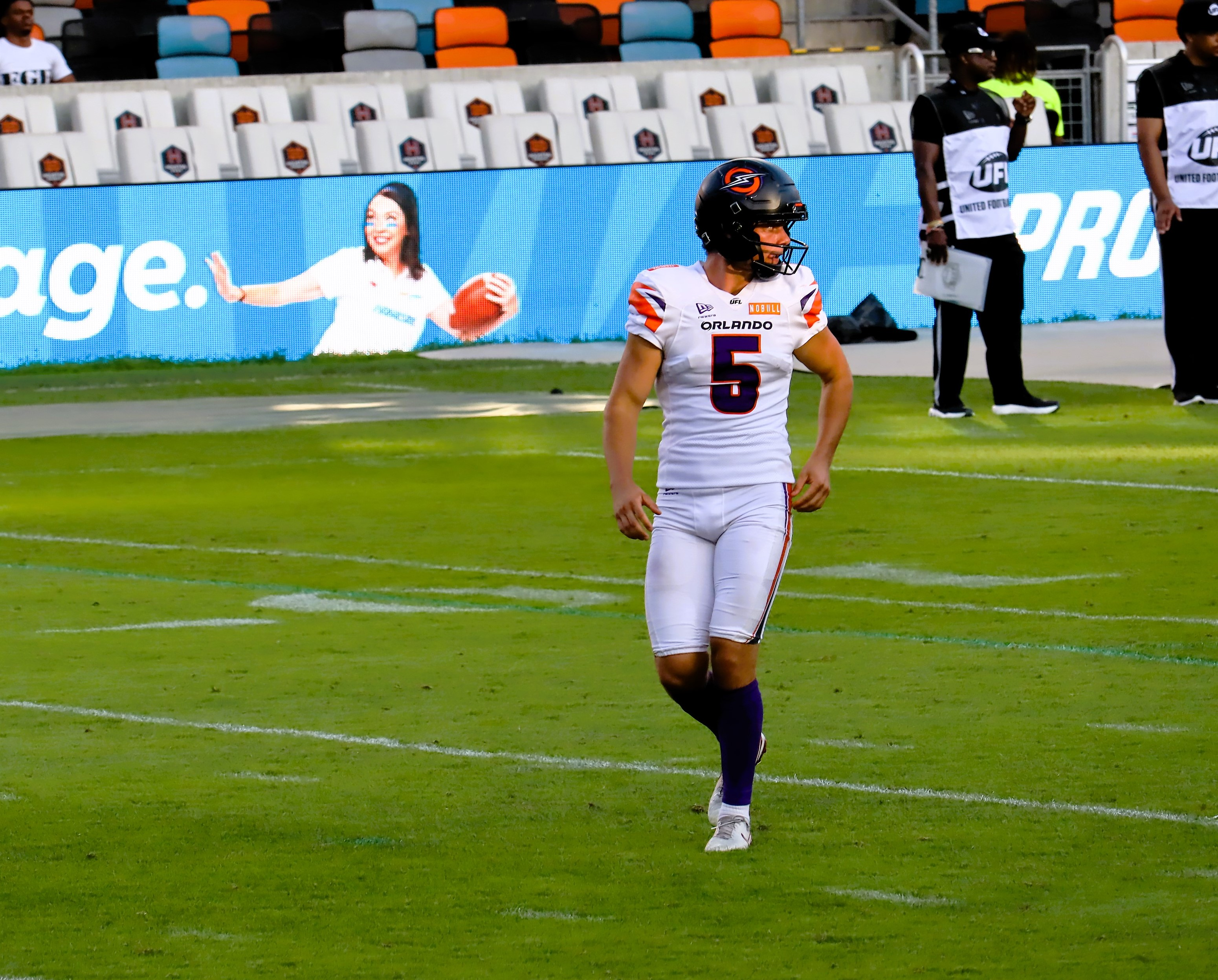
- Browning with the Orlando Storm in 2026

No. 31 – Miami Dolphins
- Position: Punter
- Roster status: Practice squad

Personal information
- Born: November 14, 2001 (age 25); Lakeside, California, U.S.
- Listed height: 5 ft 11 in (1.80 m)
- Listed weight: 190 lb (86 kg)

Career information
- High school: West Hills (Santee, California)
- College: Grossmont (2019–2020); San Diego State (2021–2023)
- NFL draft: 2024: undrafted

Career history
- Buffalo Bills (2024)*; Baltimore Ravens (2024)*; Tampa Bay Buccaneers (2024); Orlando Storm (2026); Arizona Cardinals (2026)*; Miami Dolphins (2026–present)
- * Offseason or practice squad member only

Awards and highlights
- MW Special Teams Player of the Year (2022); First-team All-MW (2022); Second-team All-MW (2023)

Career NFL statistics
- Punts: 10
- Punting yards: 425
- Punting average: 42.5
- Inside 20: 0
- Touchbacks: 1
- Stats at Pro Football Reference

Jack Browning (born November 14, 2001) is an American professional football punter for the Miami Dolphins of the National Football League (NFL). He played college football for the Grossmont Griffons and San Diego State Aztecs and was also a placekicker in college. He has previously been a member of the Buffalo Bills, Baltimore Ravens, Tampa Bay Buccaneers, and Arizona Cardinals.

== Early life ==
Browning was born on November 14, 2001, in Lakeside, California. He attended West Hills High School in Santee, California, where he won two varsity letters and competed in football and track and field, receiving first-team all-league academic honors in football. He was a zero-star recruit and had no offers to play NCAA Division I college football, and thus he opted to play for the local Grossmont Griffins, a community college team.

== College career ==
As a freshman at Grossmont in 2019, Browning served as the team's placekicker and punter, being named second-team all-conference after making four of six field goals, 14 of 16 extra points, and averaging 38.2 yards on 60 punts. The 2020 season was canceled due to the COVID-19 pandemic. He transferred to the San Diego State Aztecs (SDSU) in 2021 as a walk-on and made the team.

In his first year at San Diego State, 2021, Browning appeared in 13 of 14 games as the team's main holder, also scoring a 13-yard rushing touchdown on a fake field goal attempt. He became the team's top kicker and punter in 2022 and was placed on scholarship midway through the season. He punted 68 times for 3,135 yards (46.1 average) and made 20 of 25 field goals with a long of 52 yards, additionally making all 30 of his extra point attempts and being named second-team All-American at punter by Pro Football Focus (PFF). He also had 59 kickoffs with an average of 64.1 yards and 37 touchbacks. He was named the Mountain West Conference (MW) Special Teams Player of the Year and was named San Diego State's special teams MVP. Browning was named first-team All-MW at punter, the College Football Network (CFN) MW Punter of the Year, and first-team All-MW by CFN at kickoff specialist and fourth-team All-MW at kicker by Phil Steele's magazine. PFF gave him the second-best punt grade nationally and he ranked third in SDSU history in punt average as well as tied for third in field goals; he was also the FBS-joint leader in extra point percentage and placed sixth nationally for punting average, while being first in the MW in that category. He was SDSU's nominee for the Burlsworth Trophy for best walk-on player in college football.

Entering the 2023 season, Browning's senior year, he was named to both the Lou Groza Award watchlist for best kicker nationally and to the Ray Guy Award watchlist for best punter nationally, being the only player selected for both. He ended up making 15 of 22 field goal attempts and all 23 of his extra point attempts, being the team scoring leader while also making 54 punts for 2,449 yards, with his 45.4 average being the seventh-best in team history. A team captain, he was a semifinalist for the Ray Guy Award and was a second-team All-MW selection at punter. He set a SDSU and MW record with a successful 61-yard field goal attempt and also set his school's single-game field goal record with four. He was named the MW Special Teams Player of the Week three times during the season and finished his stint at SDSU having received the award five times.

== Professional career ==
Pre-draft measurables
Height	Weight	Arm length	Hand span	Wingspan
5 ft 11 1/4 in (1.81 m)	190 lb (86 kg)	30 1/8 in (0.77 m)	8 3/4 in (0.22 m)	6 ft 2 1/2 in (1.89 m)
All values from Pro Day

=== Buffalo Bills ===
After going unselected in the 2024 NFL draft, Browning signed with the Buffalo Bills as an undrafted free agent to play punter. He was released by the Bills on July 31, 2024.

=== Baltimore Ravens ===
Browning signed with the Baltimore Ravens on August 11, 2024. He was waived on August 26.

=== Tampa Bay Buccaneers ===
Browning signed to the practice squad of the Tampa Bay Buccaneers on October 23, 2024. He was promoted to the active roster on December 28. He was waived by the Buccaneers on March 14, 2025.

=== Orlando Storm ===
On January 14, 2026, Browning was selected by the Orlando Storm in the 2026 UFL Draft.

=== Arizona Cardinals ===
On August 25, 2026, Browning was signed by the Arizona Cardinals. Browning was waived by the Cardinals as a part of final roster cuts on August 30.

=== Miami Dolphins ===
On November 18, 2026, Browning signed with the Miami Dolphins practice squad.
