= Tanner Engstrand =

American football coach (born 1982)

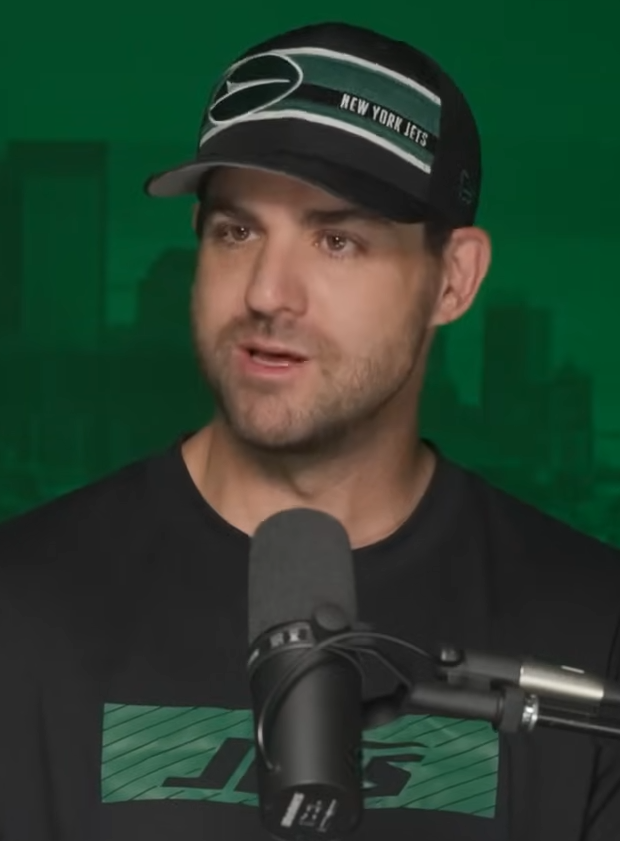
- Engstrand with the New York Jets in 2025

Atlanta Falcons
- Title: Passing game coordinator

Personal information
- Born: June 18, 1982 (age 44); San Diego, California, U.S.
- Listed height: 6 ft 0 in (1.83 m)
- Listed weight: 210 lb (95 kg)

Career information
- Position: Quarterback
- High school: West Hills (Santee, California)
- College: San Diego State

Career history
- San Diego (2005–2017); Graduate assistant (2005–2006); Running backs coach (2007–2008); Quarterbacks coach (2009–2010); Offensive coordinator & quarterbacks coach (2011–2012); Assistant head coach, offensive coordinator & quarterbacks coach (2013–2017); Michigan (2018) Offensive analyst; DC Defenders (2020) Offensive coordinator & running backs coach; Detroit Lions (2020–2024); Offensive assistant (2020); Offensive quality control coach (2021); Tight ends coach & passing game coordinator (2022); Passing game coordinator (2023–2024); New York Jets (2025) Offensive coordinator; Atlanta Falcons (2026–present) Passing game coordinator
- Coaching profile at Pro Football Reference

Tanner Engstrand (born June 18, 1982) is an American professional football coach who is the passing game coordinator for the Atlanta Falcons of the National Football League (NFL). Before 2026 he served as an assistant coach for the Detroit Lions from 2020 to 2024, and as the offensive coordinator of the New York Jets in 2025.

== Playing career ==
Engstrand attended Grossmont College and transferred to San Diego State, where he played quarterback from 2003 to 2004.

== Coaching career ==
Engstrand began his coaching career at San Diego as a graduate assistant under Jim Harbaugh. He later coached running backs and quarterbacks at San Diego before being promoted to offensive coordinator in 2011. Engstrand was also an offensive analyst under Harbaugh at Michigan in 2018.

=== DC Defenders ===
Engstrand was named the offensive coordinator for the DC Defenders of the XFL in 2019.

=== Detroit Lions ===
After the XFL ceased operations, Engstrand was hired as an offensive assistant for the Detroit Lions in 2020. He was promoted to tight ends coach and passing game coordinator in 2022.

=== New York Jets ===
On January 31, 2025, the New York Jets hired Engstrand as their new offensive coordinator under head coach Aaron Glenn. He would later be fired by the Jets on January 28, 2026, after one season.

=== Atlanta Falcons ===
On February 1, 2026, the Atlanta Falcons hired Engstrand as passing game coordinator under new head coach, Kevin Stefanski.
