= Terry Forster =

American baseball player (born 1952)

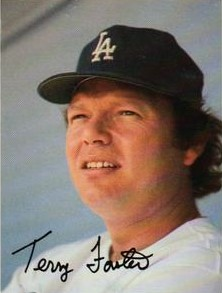
- Pitcher
- Born: January 14, 1952 (age 74); Sioux Falls, South Dakota, U.S.
- Batted: Left Threw: Left

MLB debut
- April 11, 1971, for the Chicago White Sox

Last MLB appearance
- October 2, 1986, for the California Angels

MLB statistics
- Win–loss record: 54–65
- Earned run average: 3.23
- Strikeouts: 791
- Saves: 127
- Stats at Baseball Reference

Teams
- Chicago White Sox (1971–1976); Pittsburgh Pirates (1977); Los Angeles Dodgers (1978–1982); Atlanta Braves (1983–1985); California Angels (1986)

Career highlights and awards
- World Series champion (1981); AL saves leader (1974)

Terry Jay Forster (born January 14, 1952) is an American former left-handed relief pitcher who played for 16 seasons in the Major Leagues. He played for five teams in his career and recorded 127 saves during his time in the majors.

== Early life ==
Forster grew up in California and attended Santana High School in Santee, California. A talented pitcher at the high school level, he was made a second round draft pick by the Chicago White Sox in the 1970 MLB Amateur Draft.

== Career ==
Forster rapidly ascended to the big league level, making the White Sox's opening day roster in 1971 after only 10 games at the single-A level in the minor leagues. He recorded a 3.99 ERA and hit .400 (2 for 5) as a 19-year-old. He became Chicago's top relief pitcher in 1972, allowing no home runs over 100 innings and earning 29 saves, which ranked second in the American League that season. After splitting time between the bullpen and the starting rotation in 1973, Forster returned primarily to the bullpen in 1974 and led the American League in saves with 24. He received the Sporting News Reliever of the Year Award in 1974. He then missed most of 1975 with an arm injury, which allowed teammate Rich Gossage to become the league leader in saves that season.

In 1976, new White Sox manager Paul Richards decided to put Forster in the starting rotation. The experiment backfired, as Forster responded with a 2-12 record. At the end of the season he was traded, along with Gossage, to the Pittsburgh Pirates in exchange for Richie Zisk and Silvio Martínez. Forster was subsequently reunited with Chuck Tanner, who had managed him while with the White Sox.

In the 1977 season, Forster compiled a 4.43 ERA and hit .345 (10 for 29) with Pittsburgh. After the season, Forster became a free agent, eventually signing with the Los Angeles Dodgers.

He recorded a 1.93 ERA while saving 22 games for Los Angeles in 1978. He appeared in the World Series for the Dodgers, as they lost to the New York Yankees. After the Series, he had bone chips removed from his elbow and his next three seasons were shortened by injuries. He was healthy for the Dodgers' postseason run in 1981, which culminated in him winning a World Series ring after the Dodgers defeated the Yankees in the 1981 World Series.

Fully healthy in 1982, he pitched well coming out of the bullpen. On October 3, 1982, in the last regular season game started by Dodgers ace Fernando Valenzuela, Forster yielded a seventh-inning, three-run homer to the San Francisco Giants' Joe Morgan which proved to be the winning margin in a 5-3 Giants win. The loss by the Dodgers propelled the Atlanta Braves to the 1982 National League West Division title. Forster became a free agent and signed with the Atlanta Braves for the 1983 season. He had an efficient three seasons, compiling an ERA of under 3.00 in each of those seasons.

While with the Braves, he gained notice for his weight problem. The 6'3" Forster reportedly weighed 270 pounds while with Atlanta. David Letterman gave the left-hander national notoriety in 1985, when he referred to the lefty as a "fat tub of goo" on his Late Night show. Forster later appeared as a guest on Letterman's show following the comments; he ate a sandwich as he entered the set after Letterman introduced him. He also recorded a novelty song called "Fat Is In".

The Braves released Forster shortly before the start of the 1986 season. He was signed two weeks later by the California Angels. Forster finished the year with a 3.51 ERA in 41 appearances, but was not part of the Angels' roster for the ALCS. This was Forster's last season in the major leagues, although he did play minor league baseball in the Minnesota Twins organization in 1987.

Forster was an excellent hitter, something usually not associated with relief pitchers. His .397 lifetime batting average (31 hits in 78 at bats) is the highest for any major leaguer in history with either 50 at bats or with at least 15 years of major league experience.

== See also ==
- List of Major League Baseball annual saves leaders
