= Stephen Strasburg =

American baseball pitcher (born 1988)

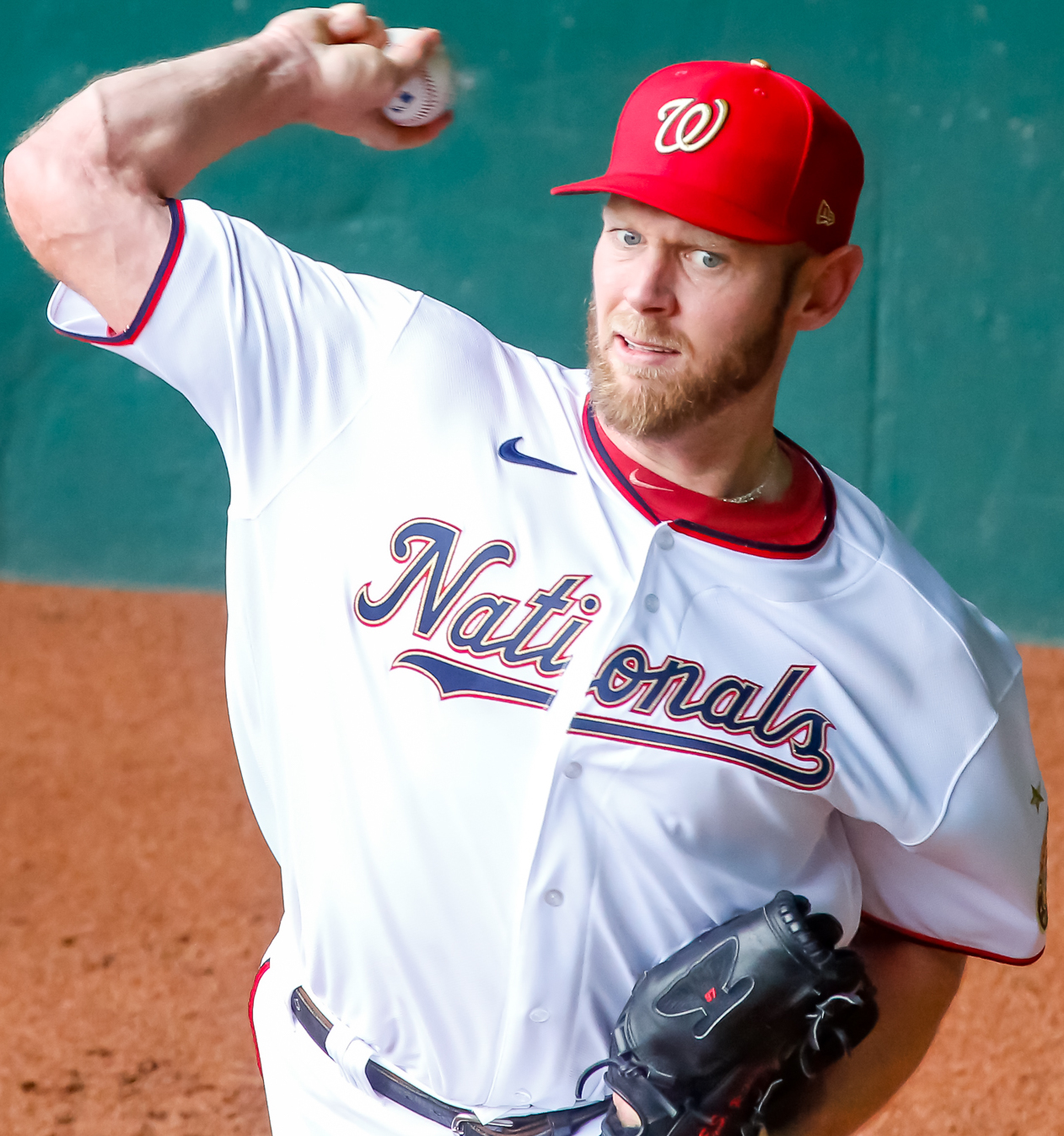
- Strasburg with the Washington Nationals in 2020
- Pitcher
- Born: July 20, 1988 (age 38); San Diego, California, U.S.
- Batted: Right Threw: Right

MLB debut
- June 8, 2010, for the Washington Nationals

Last MLB appearance
- June 9, 2022, for the Washington Nationals

MLB statistics
- Win–loss record: 113–62
- Earned run average: 3.24
- Strikeouts: 1,723
- Stats at Baseball Reference

Teams
- Washington Nationals (2010–2022)

Career highlights and awards
- 3× All-Star (2012, 2016, 2017); World Series champion (2019); World Series MVP (2019); All-MLB First Team (2019); Silver Slugger Award (2012); NL wins leader (2019); NL strikeout leader (2014); Golden Spikes Award (2009); Dick Howser Trophy (2009)
Medals
Men's baseball
Representing United States
Olympic Games
Bronze medal – third place	2008 Beijing	Team
World University Championship
Gold medal – first place	2008 Brno	National team

Stephen James Strasburg (/ˈstrɑːsbɜːrɡ/; born July 20, 1988) is an American former professional baseball pitcher who is currently an assistant with the San Diego State Aztecs baseball program. He spent his entire 13-year Major League Baseball (MLB) career with the Washington Nationals. He is a three-time All-Star and the World Series MVP of the Nationals team that won the 2019 World Series.

A talented but unpolished high school baseball player at West Hills High School, Strasburg played college baseball for the San Diego State Aztecs. There, he became one of the best collegiate pitchers in the country. Strasburg pitched for the United States national baseball team at the 2008 Summer Olympics, winning the bronze medal. Two years later, he was called the "most-hyped pick in draft history" by ESPN and the "most hyped and closely watched pitching prospect in the history of baseball" by Sports Illustrated.

Strasburg was selected by Washington with the first overall pick in the 2009 MLB draft. He recorded a franchise-record 14 strikeouts in his major league debut in June 2010. In his 12th major league game, Strasburg tore a ligament in his pitching elbow. The injury required Tommy John surgery and a year of rehabilitation. He rejoined the Nationals in September 2011, but was only able to pitch 24 innings that year. Strasburg's 2012 season marked a successful return to form; he was selected to play in the 2012 MLB All-Star Game. After he pitched 28 games in the 2012 season, the Nationals decided to shut him down for the rest of the year out to avoid overworking him in his first year after surgery. The move was highly controversial and was the subject of much debate, especially since the Nationals made the playoffs for the first time in 2012 but were eliminated in the first round.

Strasburg established himself as one of the premier pitchers in the game, though he was placed on the disabled list due to injuries several times. He led the National League (NL) in strikeouts in 2014. During the 2016 season, he signed a seven-year contract extension to remain with the Nationals, and was an All-Star that year and the following year. He led the NL in wins in 2019 with 18. Strasburg received the 2019 World Series Most Valuable Player Award for starting and winning two games against the Houston Astros as the Nationals won their first championship.

Following the Nationals' 2019 World Series victory, Strasburg opted out of his contract and then re-signed with the Nationals on a larger seven-year, $245 million deal, which was to run through 2026. Strasburg pitched only 31 1/3 innings for the Nationals after signing that contract, making his final appearance in 2022. After repeated attempts to repair damage from thoracic outlet syndrome failed, Strasburg officially retired in 2024.

== Early life ==
Strasburg was born in San Diego, California, to Jim Strasburg, a real estate developer, and Kathleen Swett Strasburg, a dietician. He grew up a San Diego Padres fan.

Strasburg credits his maternal grandmother with helping him develop his baseball skills as a child. She would frequently play catch and even work on pitching with him. He labels her as one of his biggest inspirations.

Strasburg attended West Hills High School in Santee, California. At first, he struggled on the school's baseball team, posting a 1–10 win–loss record in his junior year. A 12-strikeout game against El Capitan High School in his senior year, in which Strasburg allowed just one hit, drew attention from scouts. He finished his senior year with a 1.68 earned run average (ERA) and 74 strikeouts in 62 1/3 innings pitched, with seven complete games. He finished with three varsity letters, set school records in ERA and shutouts, and was named his school's 2006 Scholar-Athlete of the Year. He was also named second-team all-league and his team's MVP. Despite these achievements, he was not selected in that year's Major League Baseball draft.

== College career ==
Strasburg had hoped to attend Stanford University but was not accepted there. Although recruited by a number of schools across the country, he enrolled locally at San Diego State University, where both of his parents attended school. He played college baseball for the San Diego State Aztecs, coached by Baseball Hall of Fame player Tony Gwynn. When he first arrived, Strasburg was an unlikely candidate to pitch collegiate baseball at all; he was quite overweight and out of shape. His conditioning coach nicknamed him "Slothburg" and encouraged him to quit baseball. He also had a difficult time adjusting to college life, moving out of his dormitory and in with his mother after five days. He acknowledged, "I wasn't the most mature guy out of high school. … The dorm was an overload, too much, too soon." Strasburg responded with an intense workout regimen, losing 30 pounds (14 kg) in the process. He also worked to improve his mental toughness. Coaches tested him by placing him in high-pressure situations and telling him he needed to get strikeouts.

San Diego State used Strasburg as a relief pitcher in his freshman year; he began the season pitching in middle relief before becoming the Aztecs' closer. He held opponents to a .141 batting average against and was named Co-Freshman of the Year for the Mountain West Conference. In the summer of 2007, Strasburg also played for the Torrington Twisters and Vermont Mountaineers of the collegiate summer baseball New England Collegiate Baseball League (NECBL). He was named to the NECBL First Team as a closer, and was also chosen as the Top Pro Prospect and Top Relief Pitcher in the NECBL.

In 2008, as a sophomore, Strasburg was converted to a full-time starting pitcher. He went 8–3 with a 1.58 ERA and 134 strikeouts in 98 1/3 innings. Four of his thirteen starts in 2008 were complete games, two of which were shutouts. On April 11 of that year, he struck out a Mountain West Conference record 23 batters in a game versus the University of Utah. He also gained eight miles per hour on his fastball, regularly working in the upper 90s and touching 100 mph.

Strasburg finished his junior year, the 2009 season, 13–1 with a 1.32 ERA, 59 hits allowed, 16 earned runs, 19 walks, and 195 strikeouts in 109 innings pitched. In his final home start on May 8, 2009, Strasburg threw his first career no-hitter while striking out 17 Air Force Falcons batters. His lone loss came against the Virginia Cavaliers in the NCAA Regionals as Virginia advanced toward the College World Series, but he still struck out 15 in seven innings during the loss. He won the Dick Howser Trophy and the National Pitcher of the Year Award.

=== International play ===
Strasburg was named to the United States national baseball team on June 24, 2008. In that role, he appeared in the 2008 World University Baseball Championship, held in late July. The United States won the gold medal in the competition.

Strasburg was the lone collegiate player selected for the United States national team at the 2008 Summer Olympics in Beijing. In his first start at the Olympics, Strasburg one-hit the Netherlands over seven innings, striking out five of the first six batters he faced and eleven overall. The lone hit Strasburg allowed was a seventh-inning single by Sharnol Adriana.

With the United States having already secured a spot in the semifinals medal round, manager Davey Johnson held Strasburg from what would have been his second start on August 20 in order to start him on August 22 in the first round of the semifinals against Norge Luis Vera of the Cuba national baseball team. Vera outdueled Strasburg, pitching six innings and allowing only two runs, one earned. Strasburg, meanwhile, lasted only four innings while giving up three runs, two earned. Cuba won the game 10–2.

Strasburg ended up with a 1–1 record, a 1.67 ERA, and a bronze medal for the Olympics, as the United States won its following contest against Japan 8–4. He won the USA Baseball Richard W. "Dick" Case Player of the Year Award in 2008.

== Professional career ==
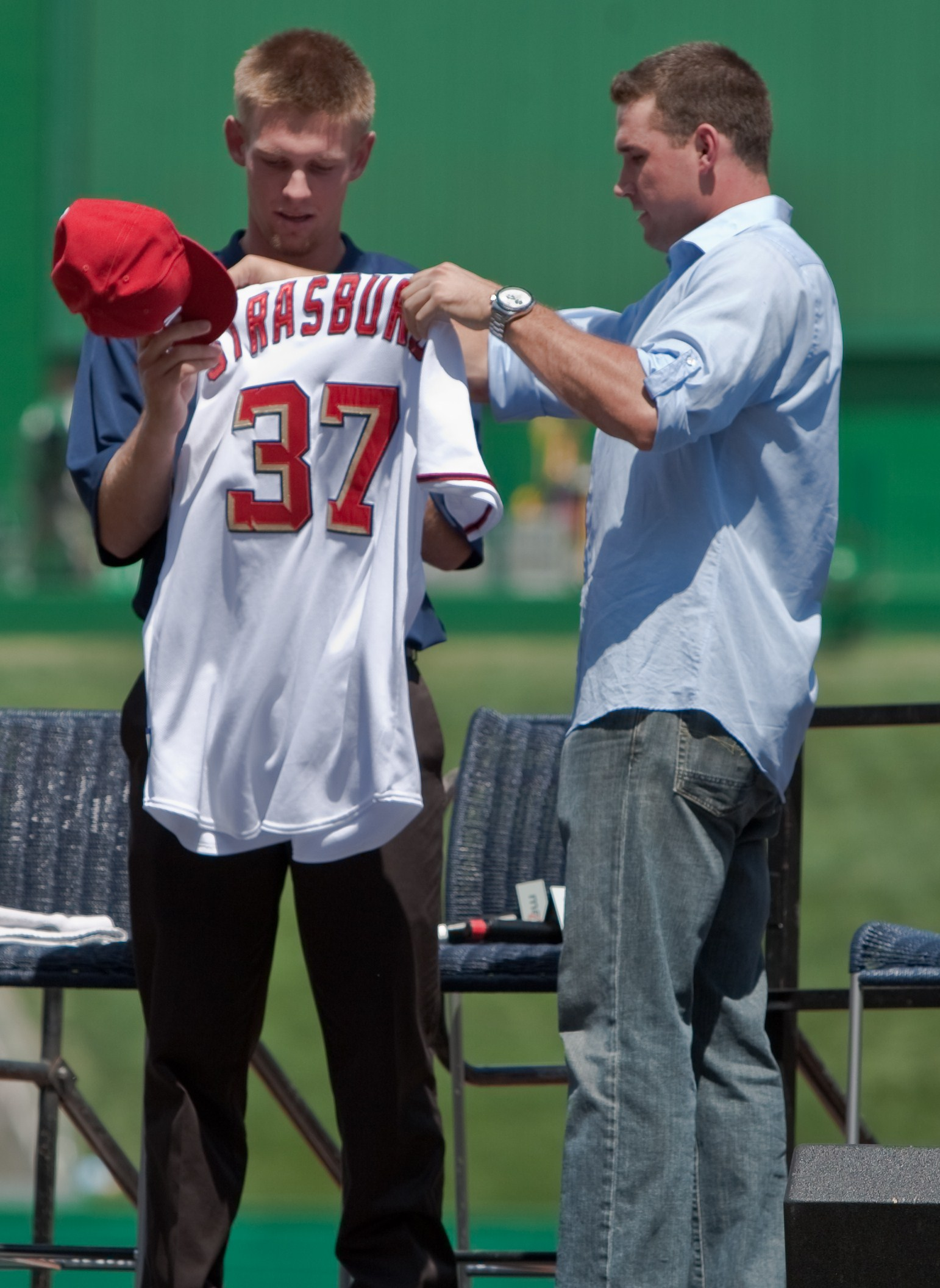
Strasburg (left) receiving a Nationals uniform from Ryan Zimmerman, August 2009

=== Draft and minor leagues ===
On June 9, 2009, Strasburg was drafted number one overall in the 2009 Major League Baseball draft by the Washington Nationals. On August 17, 2009, he signed a record-breaking four-year, $15.1 million contract with the Nationals, just 77 seconds before the deadline, shattering a dollar-amount record previously held by Mark Prior, who signed for $10.5 million in 2001. Strasburg is represented by agent Scott Boras.

Strasburg made his professional debut on October 16, 2009, starting for the Phoenix Desert Dogs in the Arizona Fall League at Phoenix Municipal Stadium. He was selected to play in the league's Rising Stars Showcase, but was unable to participate due to a minor neck injury. He also won Pitcher of the Week honors for the week of November 2, 2009 and led the AFL with four wins. Before the 2010 season started, Baseball America named Strasburg as the top pitching prospect, and the second-best overall prospect behind Jason Heyward.

Strasburg was assigned to the Harrisburg Senators of the Double-A Eastern League for the start of the 2010 season. There was so much anticipation and hype surrounding Strasburg that there were about 70 credentialed media members in attendance at his April 11, 2010 debut, and ESPN nationally broadcast portions of the game. He won his Senators debut against the Altoona Curve, allowing four hits and four runs (one earned), while striking out eight batters in five innings. During his first home start on April 16, he yielded two hits and an unearned run with three strikeouts in 2 1/3 innings in a loss to the New Britain Rock Cats, one where his innings were limited due to a rain delay. Harrisburg set an attendance record in Strasburg's home debut with 7,895 fans. He completed his Class AA stint with a 1.64 ERA while striking out 27 and walking six in 22 innings.

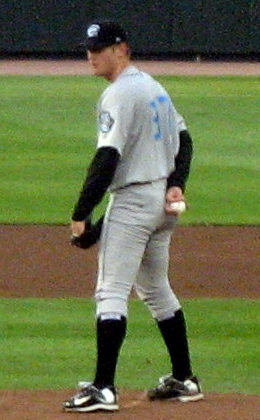
Strasburg pitching for the Syracuse Chiefs in 2010

On May 4, 2010, he was promoted to the Syracuse Chiefs of the Triple-A International League. In his first game with the Chiefs, he pitched six scoreless innings, striking out six batters while allowing one hit and one walk. That game drew 13,766 fans—the highest attendance in the 135-year history of baseball in Syracuse. In his second start, Strasburg was removed after pitching six no-hit innings. He finished his minor league stint with an overall record of 7–2, an ERA of 1.30, 65 strikeouts and 13 walks in 55 1/3 innings, and a walks plus hits per inning pitched (WHIP) ratio of 0.80.

=== Washington Nationals (2010–2022) ===
Strasburg made his major-league debut on June 8, 2010, against the Pittsburgh Pirates. A Sports Illustrated columnist termed it "the most hyped pitching debut the game has ever seen". An ESPN article revealed the colloquial name for Strasburg's celebrated debut as "Strasmas". Strasburg picked up the win in his debut, pitching seven innings, allowing two earned runs and no walks and 14 strikeouts, setting a new team strikeout record that was previously held by John Patterson (13, twice). Also, he was the first pitcher in history to strike out at least eleven batters without issuing any walks in his pro debut, while falling just one strikeout short of the all-time record for a pitcher's debut—Karl Spooner (1954) and J. R. Richard (1971) both struck out 15, but each took nine innings to do it, and each walked three. (Bob Feller also struck out 15 in his first start, although it wasn't his big league debut). He struck out every batter in the Pirates' lineup at least once and struck out the last seven batters he faced—also a Nationals record. He threw 34 of his 94 pitches at 98 miles per hour (158 km/h) or faster, including two that reached 100 miles per hour (160 km/h). The Nationals would go on to win 5-2, giving Strasburg his first pitching win.

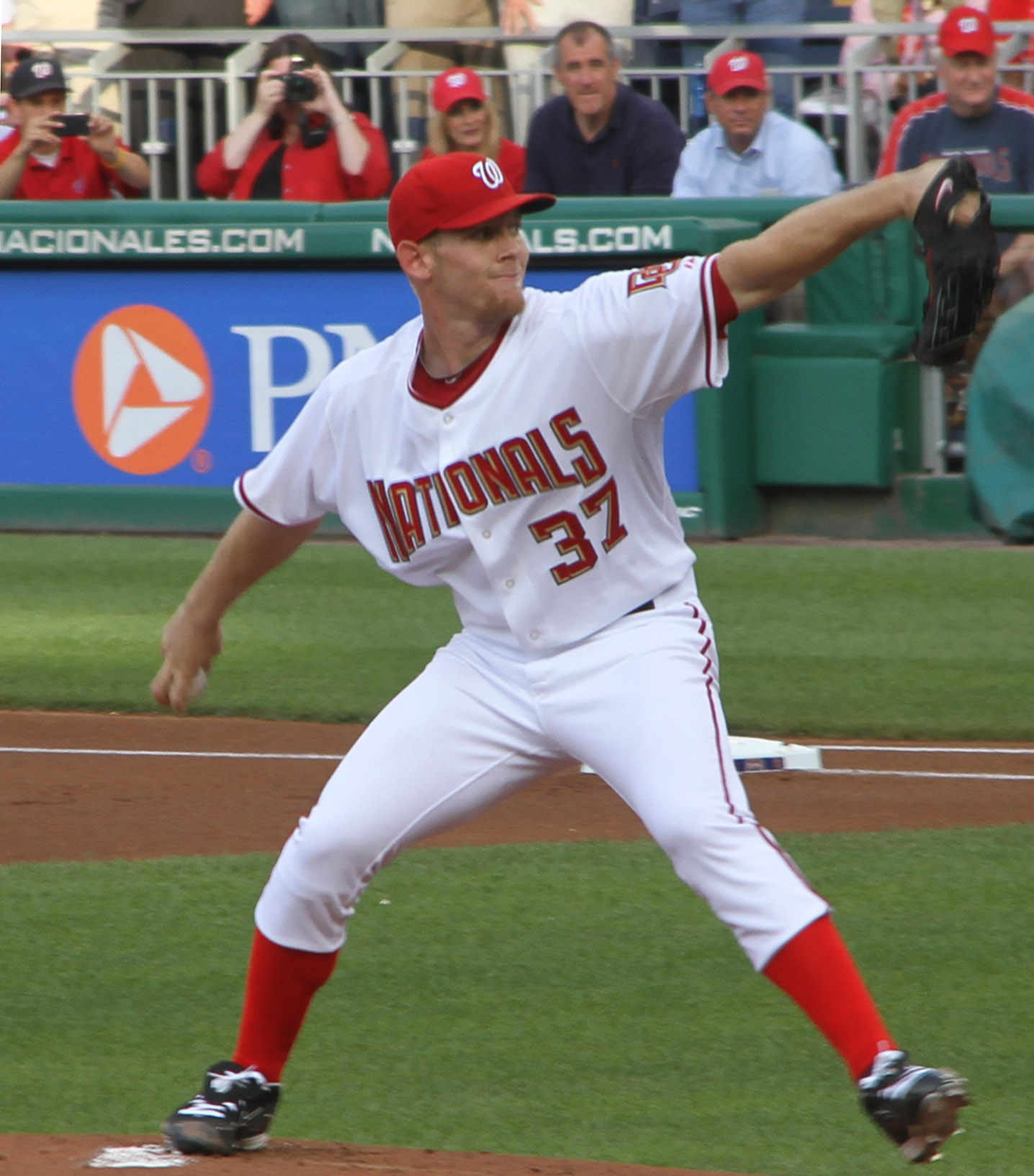
Strasburg pitching in his MLB debut

In Strasburg's second and third major league starts he struck out another eight and ten batters, respectively, setting a major league record for the most strikeouts in a pitcher's first three starts with 32. The previous record holder had been Richard, who struck out 29 in his first three starts in 1971.

Strasburg was also featured in the cover story of Sports Illustrated following his second start. His #37 jersey was the top-selling jersey in all of baseball for the month of June and became the best-selling Nationals jersey of all time in that span.

In the 2010 season Strasburg pitched in 12 games, all starts, throwing 68 innings, 92 strikeouts and compiling a 2.91 ERA. He was named a pitcher on the 2010 Topps Major League Rookie All-Star Team.

==== Injuries and rehab ====
Strasburg was placed on the disabled list with an inflamed right shoulder in July 2010. He returned to action on August 10, but in his third game back, on August 21, he was removed with an apparent injury. On August 27, the Nationals announced that Strasburg had a torn ulnar collateral ligament, requiring Tommy John surgery, and about 12 to 18 months of rehabilitation.

Strasburg made his first rehab start on August 7, 2011 for the Hagerstown Suns. Strasburg made six rehab starts during the 2011 minor league season throwing a total of 20 1/3 innings, with 29 strikeouts, compiling a 3.49 ERA and a 1–1 record. He then made five starts during the 2011 major league season, his first coming against the Los Angeles Dodgers on September 6. That year he threw for 24 innings, struck out 24, compiled a 1.50 ERA and a 1–1 record.

==== 2012 season ====
In April 2012, Strasburg accumulated an NL-best 34 strikeouts and second-best 1.13 ERA. He totaled six walks and did not give up a home run. Consequently, he was named NL Pitcher of the Month. On May 20, Strasburg went 2-for-2 as a hitter in a game against the Baltimore Orioles and hit his first career home run, a solo shot off of Wei-Yin Chen. In his June 13 start against the Toronto Blue Jays, Strasburg became the first pitcher of the year to strike out 100 batters. On July 1, Strasburg was elected to his first All-Star Game, alongside teammates Gio González, Ian Desmond, and Bryce Harper.

As part of Strasburg's rehabilitation from his Tommy John surgery, and as a precaution due to his low innings total in 2011, the Nationals decided to limit the number of innings Strasburg would throw in the 2012 season. Although the number was never official, rumors started that Strasburg's limit would be between 160 and 180 innings. It was also decided that Strasburg's shutdown would be final; he would not pitch in the playoffs. Dr. Lewis Yocum, the surgeon who operated on Strasburg's elbow, agreed in 2011 that Strasburg's 2012 innings total should be limited, although he did not consult with Nationals General Manager Mike Rizzo or Strasburg during the season. Teammate Jordan Zimmermann underwent a similar process the year before.

Strasburg's high profile and the success of the Nationals in the 2012 season made the innings limit a topic of national conversation. In addition to baseball writers, a number of other figures made their views on the topic known, including football broadcasters Troy Aikman and Terry Bradshaw, basketball reporter Stephen A. Smith, and even prominent politicians such as Rudy Giuliani and Mitch McConnell. Rizzo defended the decision to shut down Strasburg and criticized the buzz surrounding it: "It's a good conversational piece, it's a good debatable subject. But most of the people that have weighed in on this know probably 10 percent of the information that we know, and that we've made our opinion based upon."

The Nationals announced that Strasburg would be scheduled to make his final start on September 12 and would be replaced by John Lannan in the Nationals' starting rotation. However, after a rough outing on September 8, Davey Johnson announced that Strasburg was finished for the 2012 season. Strasburg was left off the postseason roster as the Nationals lost the 2012 NLDS to the St. Louis Cardinals in five games. He ended the season 15–6 with a 3.16 ERA, 1.15 WHIP and 197 strikeouts in 159 1/3 innings pitched. Strasburg hit .277 with a home run, seven RBIs, and three walks, earning himself a Silver Slugger Award.

==== 2013 season ====
Strasburg pitched Opening Day for the Nationals at Nationals Park in Washington, D.C., on April 1, 2013. He went seven innings, giving up no runs and three hits and recording three strikeouts. Following the first batter of the game, Juan Pierre, he retired nineteen straight batters. Strasburg earned the decision, a win, with a final score of 2–0.

Strasburg served a brief stint on the disabled list with a mild lateral strain in June and was re-activated on June 16.

Strasburg achieved milestones in longevity in 2013. He pitched into the 8th inning for the first time in his big-league career on May 16, in a win against his hometown San Diego Padres, and in subsequent starts on May 26 and July 24. On August 11, 2013, Strasburg pitched his first career complete game, throwing a 6–0 shutout over the Philadelphia Phillies with 10 strikeouts and 4 hits.

He was ejected for the first time in his MLB career on August 17, 2013 by umpire Marvin Hudson for intentionally pitching at Braves batter Andrelton Simmons in the second inning of a Nationals-Braves game. Prior to the ejection, Hudson warned both teams after Strasburg hit Justin Upton with a first-pitch fastball following a Braves home run.

Strasburg finished the year with a 3.00 ERA, 1.05 WHIP, eight wins, nine losses, and 191 strikeouts over 183 innings pitched.

==== 2014 season ====
Strasburg led the league in strikeouts along with Johnny Cueto and finishing 9th in the Cy Young award balloting. He posted career-bests in starts (34), innings pitched (215) and strikeouts (242). His won-loss was 14−11.

He made his first postseason appearance by starting Game 1 of the 2014 NLDS, and was the losing pitcher in a 3-2 loss after throwing five innings and surrendering one earned run.

==== 2015 season ====
Injuries limited Strasburg to 127 1/3 innings, his lowest output since 2011. He recorded a 3.46 ERA and won 11 games, good for third-most on the Nationals' pitching staff. Career W/L reached 54−37.

==== 2016 season ====
Strasburg signed a 7-year, $175 million extension to remain with the Nationals. With the extension, Strasburg became the first National to receive an opt-out clause in his contract, which allowed him to elect free agency after the 2019 or 2020 seasons if he desired. On June 26, 2016, he was placed on the 15-day disabled list due to an upper back strain. He returned on July 3 against the Cincinnati Reds, where he took a no-hitter through 6 2/3 innings until being lifted from the game after throwing 109 pitches. The no-hitter was broken up in the 8th inning, but the Nationals still won 12–1. On July 8, Strasburg became the first pitcher since 1912 to start 12–0. His streak of consecutive wins ran to 16, including 13 decisions in the 2016 season, before it was snapped by the Los Angeles Dodgers on July 21. On August 22, Strasburg was again placed on the 15-day disabled list due to right elbow soreness. He did not pitch again that season and was unavailable during the team's defeat by the Dodgers in the 2016 NLDS. He finished the regular season with a record of 15-4.

==== 2017 season ====
In a May 27, 2017 game versus the San Diego Padres, Strasburg struck out a career-high 15 batters in a 3−0 win. It was tied for fourth-most in Nationals franchise history.

Strasburg set a franchise record on September 10 for consecutive innings pitched without allowing a run with 34 innings, including a nine-inning complete game shutout performance on August 30 in which he hit a home run to break the scoreless tie against Miami Marlins starter Adam Conley. For the 2017 season he was 15–4 with a 2.52 ERA, and led the majors in lowest home runs per nine innings (0.67).

Strasburg started Game 1 of the 2017 NLDS against the Chicago Cubs and pitched seven innings, giving up two runs. He was charged with a loss. He started Game 4 at Wrigley Field and was the winning pitcher, throwing seven scoreless innings despite suffering from flu-like symptoms.

==== 2018 season ====
In 2018 he was 10–7 with a 3.74 ERA in 22 starts, in which he struck out 156 batters in 130 innings.

==== 2019 season: World Series MVP ====
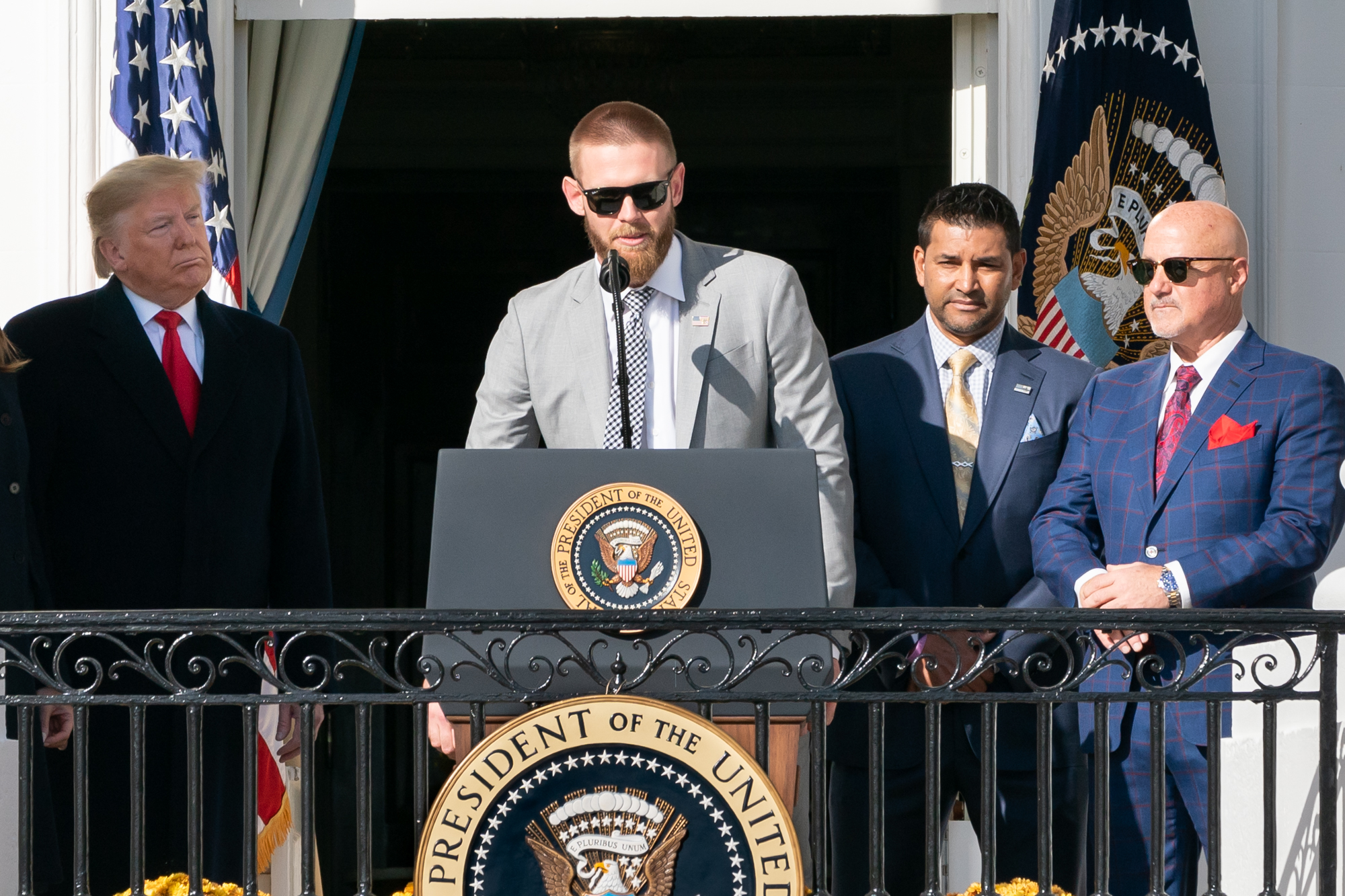
Stephen Strasburg with Dave Martinez and Mike Rizzo, meeting President Donald Trump, at the White House after the 2019 World Series Championship

On April 21, Strasburg pitched eight scoreless innings against the Miami Marlins to become the career leader in innings pitched by a Washington Nationals player. On July 3, he pitched an immaculate (top of the 4th) inning against Marlins Garrett Cooper, Neil Walker, and Starlin Castro – the fourth immaculate inning in Nationals history. On July 19, he went 3-for-3 with five RBIs, including a 420-foot three-run home run against the Atlanta Braves. He became only the fifth pitcher in the last 50 years to record two hits in the same MLB inning.

In 2019, Strasburg was 18–6 with a 3.32 ERA. He finished the regular season leading the National League in wins (18), and he finished second in strikeouts (251) behind Jacob deGrom; both were career highs.

In the Wild Card Game against the Milwaukee Brewers, Strasburg pitched three scoreless innings in relief of Max Scherzer, earning the win as the Nationals came back to beat the Brewers 4–3. In Game 2 of the 2019 National League Division Series, Strasburg allowed one run and struck out ten batters, earning the win. Strasburg pitched in the deciding Game 5 of the NLDS going six innings and allowing three runs in a no-decision. The Nationals went on to win by a score of 7–3. In Game 6 of the 2019 World Series, Strasburg allowed two runs in the first inning, but pitched into the ninth inning, earning the win. He won the World Series Most Valuable Player Award for his two wins in two appearances (first former #1 draft pick to win the award), including pitching 14 1/3 innings while striking out 14 batters and only giving up a total of 12 hits. Strasburg finished the playoffs 5–0 with a 1.98 ERA, 0.94 WHIP, and 47 strikeouts and he and teammate Juan Soto were named co-winners of the Babe Ruth Award as the overall postseason MVPs. Strasburg tied a major-league record for most victories in a single postseason (five) and became the first pitcher in MLB history to win five games in a single postseason without recording a loss.

After winning the World Series, Strasburg opted out of the remaining four years on his contract and became a free agent for the first time in his career. On December 9, 2019, Strasburg agreed to a seven-year, $245 million contract to return to the Nationals. The $35 million annual average value of the contract was at the time the largest amount received by a pitcher in MLB history.

==== 2020 season ====
Strasburg began the 2020 shortened season on the injured list (IL); he made his 2020 debut on August 9, 2020. On August 14, Strasburg left the second game he started, after facing only three batters. The following day, Strasburg went back to the IL with a nerve issue in his pitching hand. Strasburg would miss the remainder of the year with the two games being his only appearances on the year.

==== 2021 season ====
Strasburg made two starts for the Nationals in 2021 before landing on the injured list on April 18 with right shoulder inflammation. Strasburg was activated and made three more starts before returning to the IL on June 2 with a neck strain. On July 27, it was announced that Strasburg would undergo surgery to alleviate neurogenic thoracic outlet syndrome, ending his 2021 season. In his 5 starts, Strasburg posted a 1–2 record and 4.57 ERA with 21 strikeouts in 21 2/3 innings of work.

==== 2022 season ====
Strasburg was activated from the IL on June 9, 2022, and made one start (in which he gave up seven earned runs in 4 1/3 innings of work) before returning to the IL five days later with a stress reaction in the ribs. On July 14, Strasburg was transferred to the 60-day IL, where he remained for the rest of the season.

==== 2023 season ====
On February 15, 2023, Strasburg did not report to spring training as scheduled due to a nerve-related setback in his recovery from thoracic outlet syndrome. On June 3, Strasburg was shut down from all physical activity due to "severe" nerve damage. Strasburg had a rib and two neck muscles removed in an effort to address his injury.

=== Retirement ===
In August 2023, media reports stated that Strasburg planned to retire. A press conference announcing his retirement was planned in early September, but did not occur after the Nationals organization balked at making the remaining payments to Strasburg under his existing contract. The team asked that Strasburg join the team and be available to active players for all regular season games, a request at which Strasburg bristled. Eventually, the two sides reached a deal to pay out the remainder of Strasburg's uninsured contract under further deferrals.

Strasburg was officially listed as retired in April 2024. Because of injuries, Strasburg made only eight starts and pitched only 31 1/3 innings for the Nationals following the signing of that contract; his earned run average during that period was 6.89. Strasburg's 2019 contract has been described as one of the worst contracts in baseball history.

Strasburg ended his major league baseball career with a 113-62 record and a 3.24 earned run average.

In October 2025 he was named to the front office staff at San Diego State as a special assistant to head coach Kevin Vance.

== Pitching style ==
=== Pitch repertoire and approach ===
Strasburg's repertoire featured five pitches: a four-seam fastball, his primary pitch at 95–97 miles per hour (153–156 km/h), which was recorded as high as 100 mph early in his career, and for which in the 2010 season was one of only three starting pitchers to have pitches of over 100 mph, and all did so at least 21 times (Justin Verlander and Ubaldo Jimenez); a two-seam fastball at 94–95 miles per hour (151–153 km/h); a curveball that Strasburg himself refers to as a slurve at 80–83 miles per hour (129–134 km/h); a changeup at 87–90 miles per hour (140–145 km/h). and a hybrid pitch he began using regularly in the 2016 season that his catcher Wilson Ramos described as a "slider-cutter", which moves laterally at 87–91 miles per hour (140–146 km/h). Strasburg throws a mix of all his pitches to left-handed hitters, but he mostly eliminates the changeup when facing right-handed hitters. He is liable to throw his four-seamer or slurve to right-handers with two strikes, and adds the changeup in those counts against lefties.

His velocity was not significantly affected by his Tommy John surgery in 2010. He had the fastest four-seam fastball among starting pitchers in the 2012 season, averaging 96.5 miles per hour (155 km/h). However, in seven seasons after Tommy John surgery he only had one pitch surpass 100 mph.

Strasburg had a high strikeout rate of 11.2 per 9 innings through his first 251 1/3 MLB innings. This corresponds with high swing-and-miss rates across all of his pitches, including 54% on his changeup—the highest whiff rate among all starting pitchers' changeups since PITCHf/x began tracking pitches. Strasburg maintained that his high strikeout rate was not intentional, and in fact was a hindrance to maintaining low pitch counts.

=== Mechanics ===
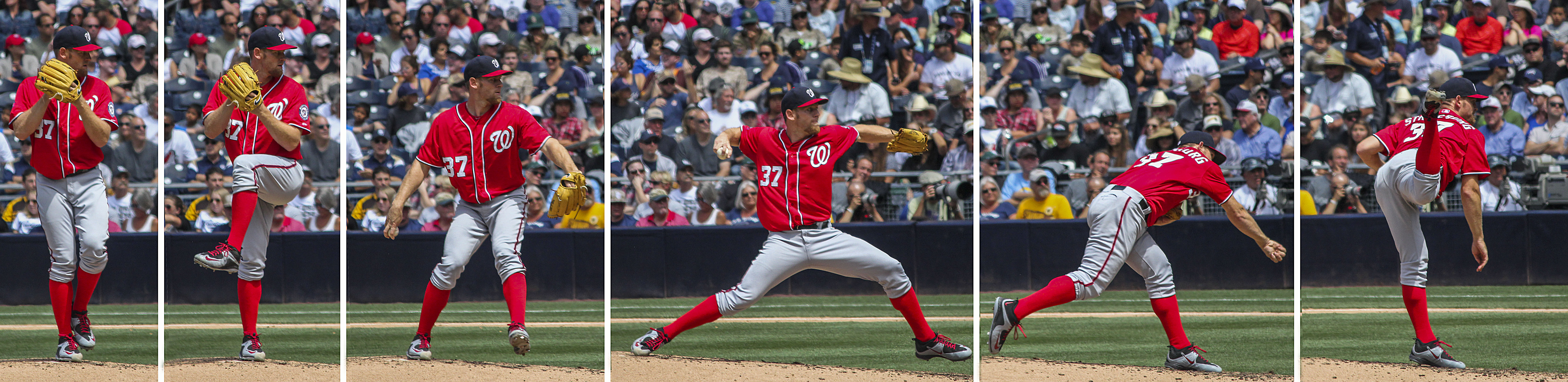
Strasburg pitching in 2015

Strasburg's pitching mechanics drew concern early in his career from scouts and coaches. The sequence of Strasburg's delivery was believed to place a great deal of stress on his arm, placing him at greater risk of elbow and shoulder injuries. Indeed, "several pitching coaches quietly predicted Strasburg was at risk" before the rupture of his elbow ligament. Independent scout Paul Reddick compared his mechanics unfavorably with those of pitching legend Greg Maddux, saying Strasburg's motion was inefficient and badly synchronized.

During the 2014 season, analysts noted a slight adjustment in Strasburg's pitching mechanics, as he moved his back foot to rest against rather than partially atop the pitching rubber when going into his throwing motion. Strasburg explained that he had been reluctant to make the change but had come to believe it would improve his development. "I didn't feel comfortable at first. Working at in between starts, it's just become second nature," he told The Washington Post. Strasburg said he had noticed an improvement in his balance and timing as a result of the new foot placement.

== Personal life ==
In 2010, Strasburg married Rachel Lackey. They met as students at San Diego State. As of 2024, the couple has three daughters. The Strasburgs relocated full-time to Washington, D.C., in 2018 and lived a short drive from Nationals Park, according to The Washington Post. In 2024, the family relocated to San Diego.

In 2014, Strasburg stated in an interview that he was going to stop chewing tobacco in the wake of his college coach Tony Gwynn's death, although he admitted to The Washington Post two years later that he had not yet completely kicked the addiction.

== See also ==
- List of Olympic medalists in baseball
- List of San Diego State University people
- List of Washington Nationals team records
- List of World Series starting pitchers
- List of Major League Baseball players who spent their entire career with one franchise

Awards and achievements
Preceded by Javier Vázquez	National League Pitcher of the Month; April 2012	Succeeded by Gio González
