= Chaparral High School (El Cajon, California) =

Public school in El Cajon, California, US

Coordinates: 32°49′3″N 116°58′50″W

Location
- 1600 North Cucamaca Street; El Cajon, California, 92020; United States

Information
- Type: Public continuation secondary
- Established: 1972
- School district: Grossmont Union High School District
- Grades: 9–12
- Enrollment: 76 (2023–2024)
- Color
- Accreditation: Western Association of Schools and Colleges (WASC)
- Nickname: Roadrunners
- Student body: Coeducational
- Website: Chaparral High School

Chaparral High School is the main continuation high school located in El Cajon, California, for the Grossmont Union High School District (GUHSD). Currently GUHSD serves 24,456 students at 12 high schools. Located in the city of El Cajon, it provides an alternative educational setting for an average of 300 students, eighty of which are designated Special Education, in grades nine through twelve.

Students at Chaparral are referred by the eleven comprehensive high schools in the District for reasons involving poor attendance, lack of academic success or behavioral issues. In addition, students may voluntarily elect to attend Chaparral. The student population changes as students are returned to their school of residence upon completion of their remediation and/or academic goals.

== Programs offered ==
Chaparral offers programs and services to supplement the basic education program. Some of these services include an incoming orientation, Special Education Program, extended day tutorials and Title I support.

Chaparral High School teaches programs such as Anger Management, along with many other programs that students can use to fit into their daily lifestyles.

== See also ==
- List of high schools in San Diego County, California
