= Joe Davenport =

American baseball player (born 1976)

- Pitcher
- Born: March 24, 1976 (age 50); Chicago, Illinois, U.S.
- Batted: Right Threw: Right

MLB debut
- July 20, 1999, for the Chicago White Sox

Last MLB appearance
- April 28, 2001, for the Colorado Rockies

MLB statistics
- Win–loss record: 0–0
- Earned run average: 3.00
- Strikeouts: 8

CPBL statistics
- Win–loss record: 18–13
- Earned run average: 2.80
- Strikeouts: 105
- Stats at Baseball Reference

Teams
- Chicago White Sox (1999); Colorado Rockies (2001); Uni-President Lions (2002–2004)

Joseph Jonathan Davenport (born March 24, 1976) is an American former Major League Baseball pitcher who played for two seasons. He played for the Chicago White Sox in 1999 and the Colorado Rockies in 2001.

Davenport attended Santana High School in Santee, California and helped the school's baseball team win a California Interscholastic Federation championship in 1994.

A single for Colorado in his only turn at-bat left Davenport with a rare MLB career batting average of 1.000.
