= Leon Bender =

American football player (1975–1998)

- Raiders introduce Leon Bender

No. 91
- Position: Defensive tackle

Personal information
- Born: August 8, 1975
- Died: May 30, 1998 (aged 22); Marietta, Georgia, U.S.

Career information
- High school: Santana (Santee, California)
- College: Washington State
- NFL draft: 1998: 2nd round, 31st overall pick

Career history
- Oakland Raiders (1998)*
- * Offseason or practice squad member only

Awards and highlights
- Third-team All-American (1997); First-team All-Pac-10 (1997); Alamo Bowl champion (1994); Santana Sultans no.77 retired

Leon Bender (August 8, 1975 – May 30, 1998) was an American football defensive tackle who was selected in the second round of the 1998 NFL draft (31st overall) by the Oakland Raiders. He played college football at Washington State under head coach Mike Price; in his senior season of 1997, the Cougars won the Pac-10 title and played in the Rose Bowl, WSU's first return to the game in 67 years. He graduated in 1993 from Santana High School in Santee, California, east of San Diego.

== Death ==
Six weeks after the draft, Bender unexpectedly died at age 22 before gaining the opportunity to play an NFL game. He was found dead in the home of sports agent Terry Bolar in Marietta, Georgia, northwest of Atlanta. Bender was visiting Bolar, an associate of Eugene Parker, Bender's agent. He had signed a five-year, $3.45 million contract a few weeks earlier, and was in Georgia to train for an upcoming Raiders' mini-camp.

The Cobb County medical examiner's office confirmed on June 10 that a seizure disorder was the cause of death. Bender had been previously diagnosed with epilepsy, known by Washington State and the Raiders, but not publicized; his Cougar teammates were not aware of it. He was buried in California at Singing Hills Memorial Park in El Cajon.

== See also ==
- List of gridiron football players who died during their careers
