= West Hills High School =

Coordinates: 32°50′53″N 117°00′52″W

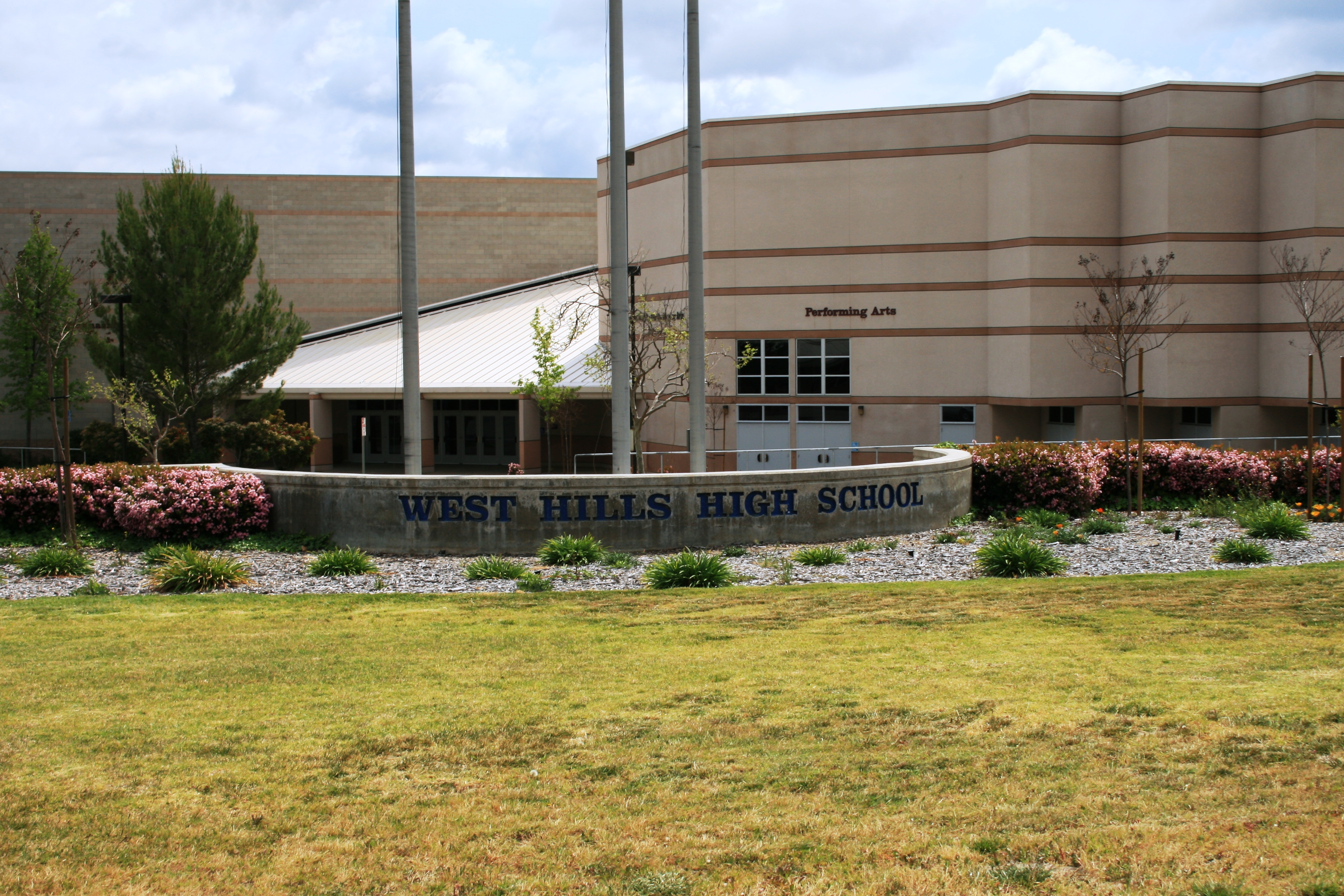
- West Hills High School in 2009

Location
- 8756 Mast Boulevard; Santee, California 92071; United States

Information
- Type: Public comprehensive secondary
- Motto: We are one, we are the Pack
- Established: 1987
- School district: Grossmont Union High School District
- Principal: John Hoadley
- Teaching staff: 7.05 (FTE)
- Grades: 9-12
- Enrollment: 1,515 (2023-2024)
- Student to teacher ratio: 214.89
- Campus: Suburban
- Colors: Silver, royal blue, and black
- Rival: Santana High School
- Accreditation: Western Association of Schools and Colleges (WASC)
- Yearbook: La Manada
- Nickname: Wolf Pack
- Website: West Hills High School

West Hills High School (WHHS) is a public, comprehensive high school in Santee, California, and serves students in grades nine through twelve. Opened in 1987, West Hills is the eleventh of thirteen high schools to be constructed in the Grossmont Union High School District which serves the East County area of San Diego County.

== History ==
West Hills High School opened in 1985 as a satellite campus of Santana High School to address overcrowding, with freshmen attending morning classes before being bused back to Santana for afternoon instruction. On September 7, 1987, the school opened as the district’s tenth high school with 14 teachers and 320 freshmen. Construction of the 87-acre (350,000 m^{2}) campus began in 1989 and was planned in two phases, with the first phase completed prior to the 1990–91 school year. The first graduating class held its commencement in June 1991 at San Diego State University.

The wolf statues

== Extracurricular activities ==
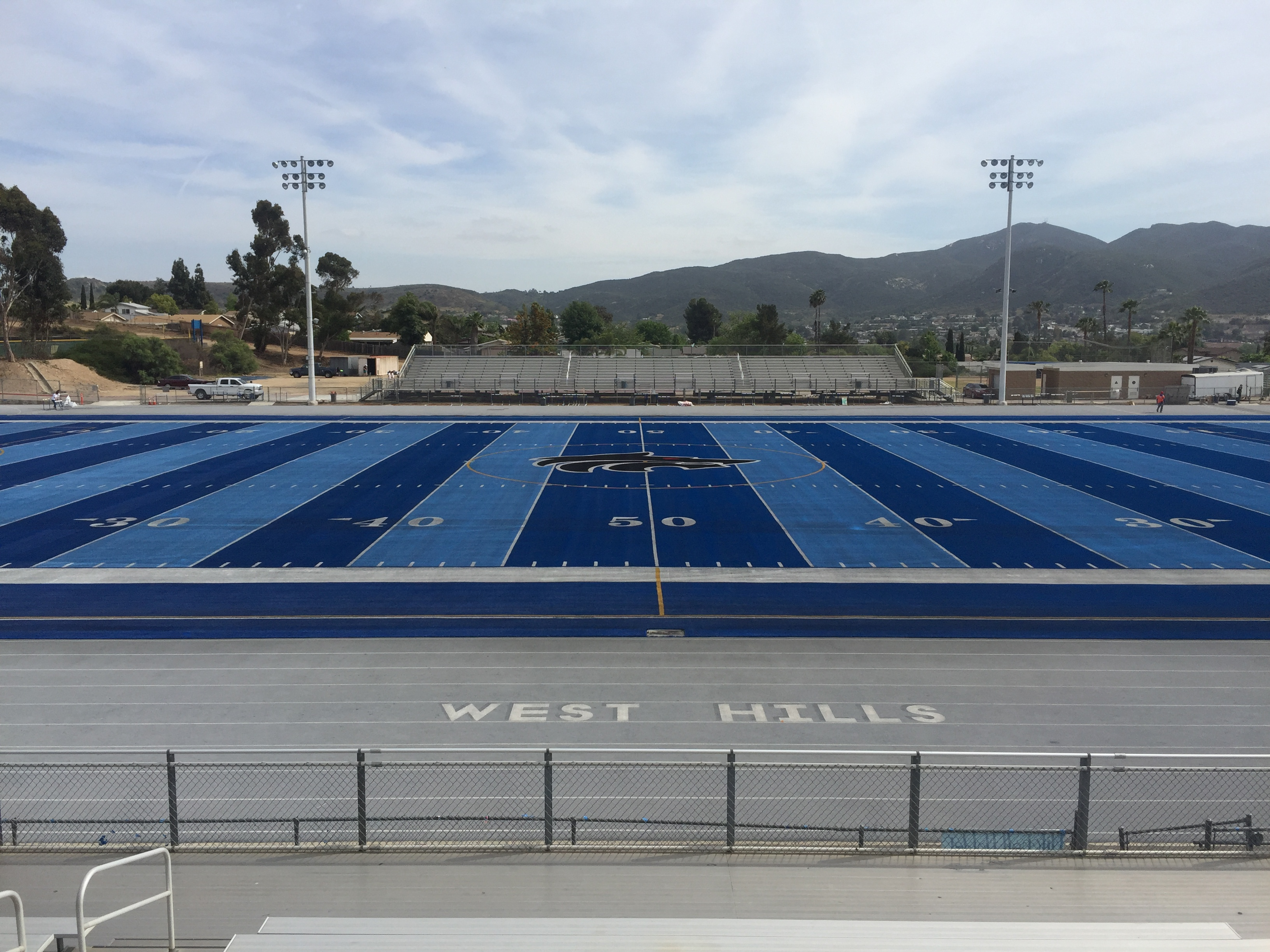
West Hills High School Stadium in 2023

Athletics

West Hills High School’s athletic teams, known as the Wolf Pack, compete in the Hills League of the Grossmont Conference and in the California Interscholastic Federation (CIF) CIF San Diego Section. In 2013, the school introduced Wolfette as a secondary mascot, and in 2012 it completed and officially opened a new swimming pool.

Fall sports	Winter sports	Spring sports
Cheerleading	Academic league	Baseball
Cross country	Basketball	Softball
Field hockey	E-sports	Gymnastics
Football	Soccer	Track and field
Water polo (men)	Water polo (women)	Lacrosse
Volleyball (women)	Wrestling	Volleyball (men)
Tennis (women)		Swim and dive
Golf (women)		Tennis (men)
Flag football		Golf (men)

- 2000 - Teammates Evan Fox and Ben Aragon place 1st and 4th in the mile at the California State Track and Field Championships.

== Notable alumni ==
- Stephen Strasburg, 2006, first overall pick in the 2009 MLB draft, pitcher for Washington Nationals, MVP of the 2019 MLB World Series
- Dat Phan, 1993, Last Comic Standing winner (season 1)
- Mega64, 2002, Internet comedy troupe consisting of Rocco Botte, Derrick Acosta, and Shawn Chatfield.
- Jack Browning, 2019, punter for the Tampa Bay Buccaneers
- Tanner Engstrand Offensive coordinator of the New York Jets

== Former principals ==
- 1999 - Principal Marge Cole is reassigned after 74% of the faculty sign a letter of no confidence in her management style.
- 1999 - Jim Peabody becomes the new principal.
- 2003 - Mike Lewis becomes the new principal.
- 2005 - Brian Wilbur becomes the new principal.
- 2008 - Patrick Keeley becomes the new principal.
- 2011 - Paul Dautremont becomes the new principal.
- 2015 - Robin Ballarin becomes the new principal.
- 2022 - April Baker becomes the new principal.
- 2026 - John Hoadley becomes the new principal.
