= Santana High School =

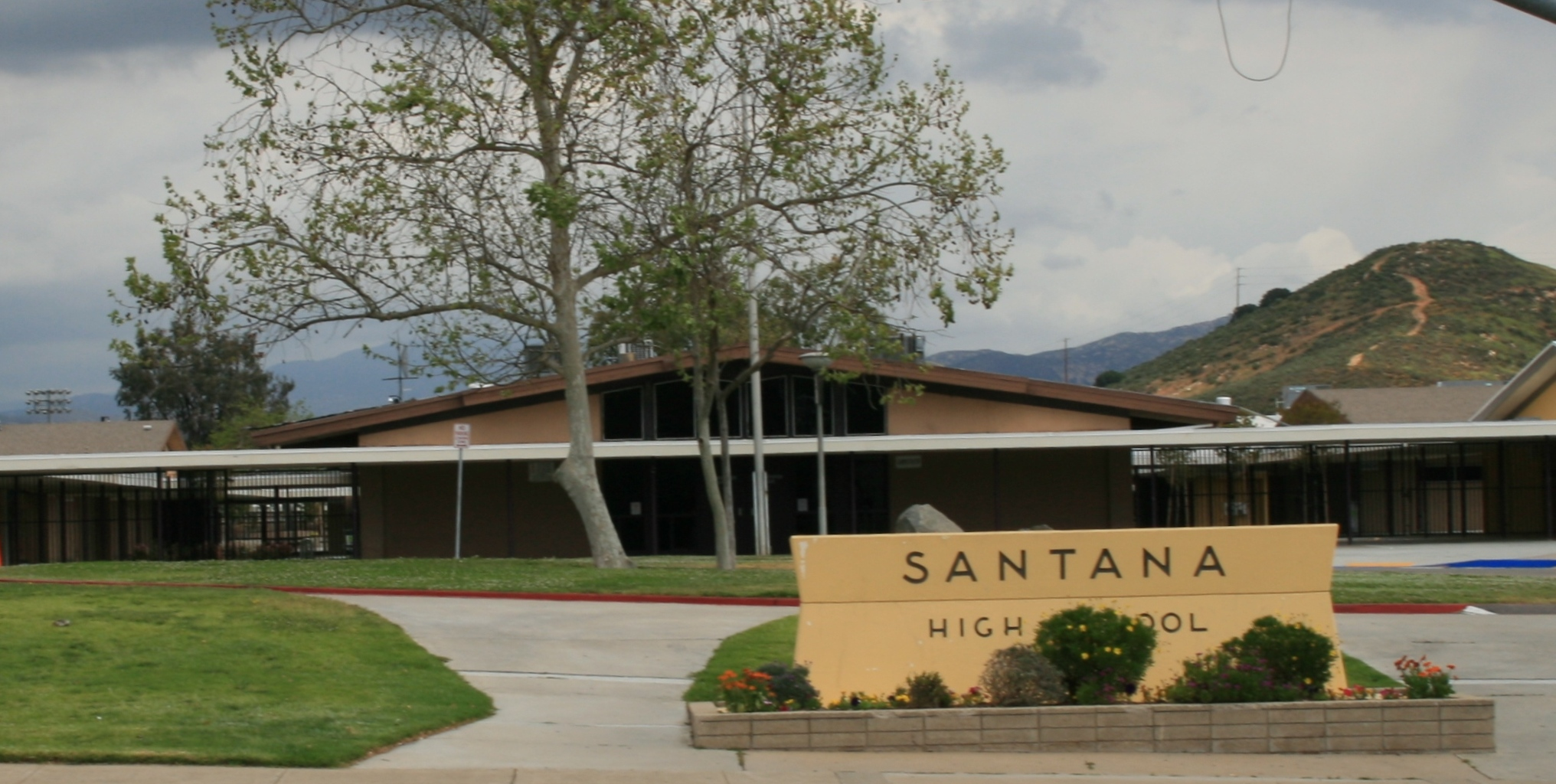

Location
- 9915 Magnolia Avenue; Santee, California, 92071; United States; 32°51′27″N 116°58′09″W

Information
- Type: Public comprehensive secondary
- Motto: "Home of Scholars and Champions"
- Established: 1966
- School district: Grossmont Union High School District
- Principal: Esteban Monge
- Teaching staff: 17.65 (FTE)
- Grades: 9-12
- Enrollment: 1,712 (2023-2024)
- Student to teacher ratio: 97.00
- Campus: Urban
- Colors: Purple, gold and white
- Nickname: Sultans
- Rival: West Hills High School
- Accreditation: Western Association of Schools and Colleges (WASC)
- Yearbook: Sultan Memories
- Website: Santana High School

Santana High School is a public high school in Santee, California. It is part of Grossmont Union High School District.

== History ==
Establishment:

The school was initially constructed in 1965 in Santee at 9915 Magnolia Avenue with Mr. Robert Spencer as principal.

=== 2001 Shooting ===
On March 5, 2001, at Santana High School, 15-year-old Charles Andrew Williams shot and killed two students and injured thirteen other people — eleven students and two staff members. Students and faculty were evacuated to a nearby shopping center, and local businesses and churches helped to handle students and parents. Some students said that they heard him saying, weeks before the shootings, that he was "going to pull a Columbine". Retreating to a bathroom, he was apprehended by police. On June 20, 2002, Williams pleaded guilty to all charges against him in an effort to avoid trial. He was sentenced to 50 years to life in prison. He was eligible for a first youth offender parole in September 2024. Parole was not granted, resulting in a three year waiting period until his next parole hearing.

== Robotics program ==
Santana High School participates in the *FIRST Robotics Competition, a world-wide robotics program where students will design, build, and program robots from scratch, to compete in competitions in a 3 month period. Sultan Robotics Team 3965 was founded in 2012, has won 9 awards, traveled to the world championship 3 times, and made an appearance to the world championship finals in 2018. This marked the first time a team from San Diego had made it to the championship finals

== Notable alumni ==
- Leon Bender, 1993, National Football League defensive lineman, Oakland Raiders
- Alex Bowen, 2011, member of United States men's national water polo team
- Joe Davenport, 1994, MLB pitcher, Chicago White Sox, Colorado Rockies
- Sharon Davis, 1972, former First Lady of California
- Mitchelle Drulis, politician who has represented the 16th legislative district in the New Jersey General Assembly since 2024
- Terry Forster, 1970, Major League Baseball (MLB) relief pitcher, Chicago White Sox, Los Angeles Dodgers, Atlanta Braves, Pittsburgh Pirates, Los Angeles Angels
- Lon Hinkle, 1967, professional golfer on the PGA Tour
- Brian Jones (born 1968), politician serving in the California State Senate
- Hayden Penn, 2002, MLB pitcher, Baltimore Orioles, Florida Marlins, Pittsburgh Pirates
- Joe Price, 1974, MLB pitcher, Cincinnati Reds, San Francisco Giants, Boston Red Sox, Baltimore Orioles
- Jim Tatum, 1985, MLB infielder, Milwaukee Brewers, Colorado Rockies, Boston Red Sox, San Diego Padres, New York Mets
- William Wall, 1995, filmmaker
- Dan Walters (1966 – 2020), MLB player. Catcher for San Diego Padres.
