= Mega64 =

American satirical comedy troupe

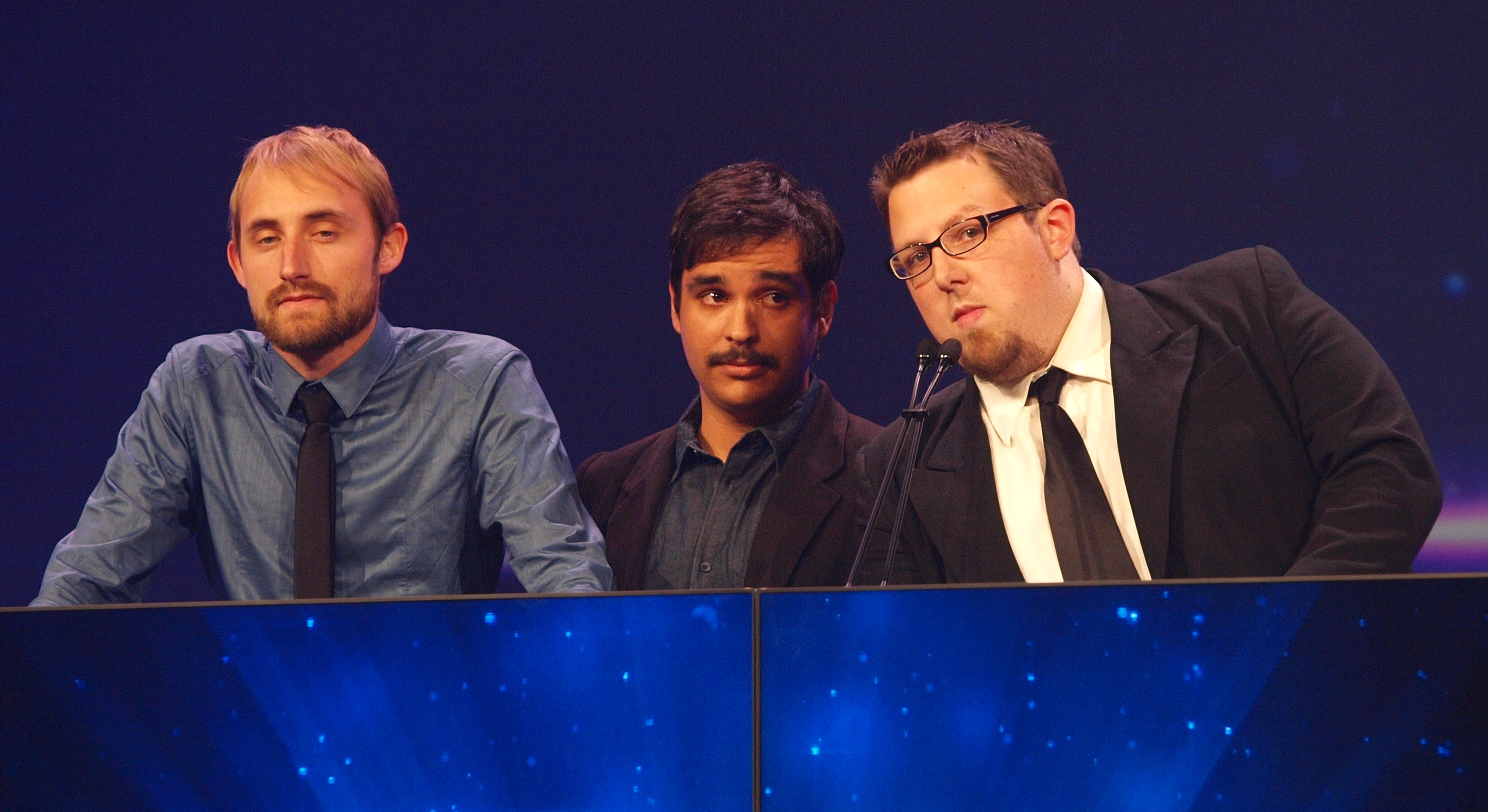
- Mega64 on stage at the Game Developers Choice Awards, March 2010. From left to right: Chatfield, Acosta, and Botte.

YouTube information
- Channel: Mega64
- Years active: 2003–present
- Genres: Comedy; video games
- Subscribers: ~674,000
- Views: 239.1 million
- Last updated: April 19, 2026
- Website: www.mega64.com

Mega64 is an American comedy troupe and independent production company created by Rocco Botte, Derrick Acosta, and Shawn Chatfield. Founded in San Diego in 2003, Mega64 is responsible for producing an eponymous web series, various sketches, and a podcast.

== History ==
The group's original self-titled show Mega64 first appeared on public-access television in 2003, later appearing in DVD form as "Version 1". This was later followed by two more seasons in the half-hourly format (titled Version 2 and Version 3) in 2006 and 2010 respectively, before being followed by a film continuation, V4.1 Revengurrection, in 2021.

Outside of this the show has undertaken numerous other projects, including abridged "Five Minute" retellings of the Dragon Ball Z anime series. This followed from promotional work they did with Funimation in 2015 for the then upcoming Resurrection 'F' movie.

Mega64 has been noted for its work with the Game Developers Conference's Game Developers Choice Awards, creating sketches depicting the fictionalized backstories of Lifetime Achievement Award winners including Ken Kutaragi and Hironobu Sakaguchi. Their standalone videos have also included numerous cameos from well-known members of the video game industry including Hideo Kojima, Gabe Newell, and Shigeru Miyamoto.

The group faced possible closure in 2024 following a collapse in merch sales and ad revenue, as well as their streams becoming the victim of scams. Following a livestream announcing their growing financial issues they were saved following a tripling of Patreon memberships and donations.

== Promotional work ==
The group has also undertaken promotional work for a variety of video game companies including Ubisoft, and Koji Igarashi's crowdfunded title Bloodstained: Ritual of the Night.

== Social media ==
Members of the group have been known to use their social media presence to jokingly mislead those unaware of their work with fake leak announcements. An example of this occurred in September 2026 where numerous outlets and individuals within the gaming sphere fell for a tweet declaring there'd be a "huge" Sony announcement the following day as though it came from a trusted source, which upon the deadline saw them upload a comedic video detailing that the Playstation 6 console would itself be "non-physical" (alluding to controversy over Sony's recent announcement to be ending physical game releases for their consoles).

== Reception ==
Variety named Mega64 as one of its "10 Comics to Watch for 2015".
