= Hayden Penn =

American baseball player (born 1984)

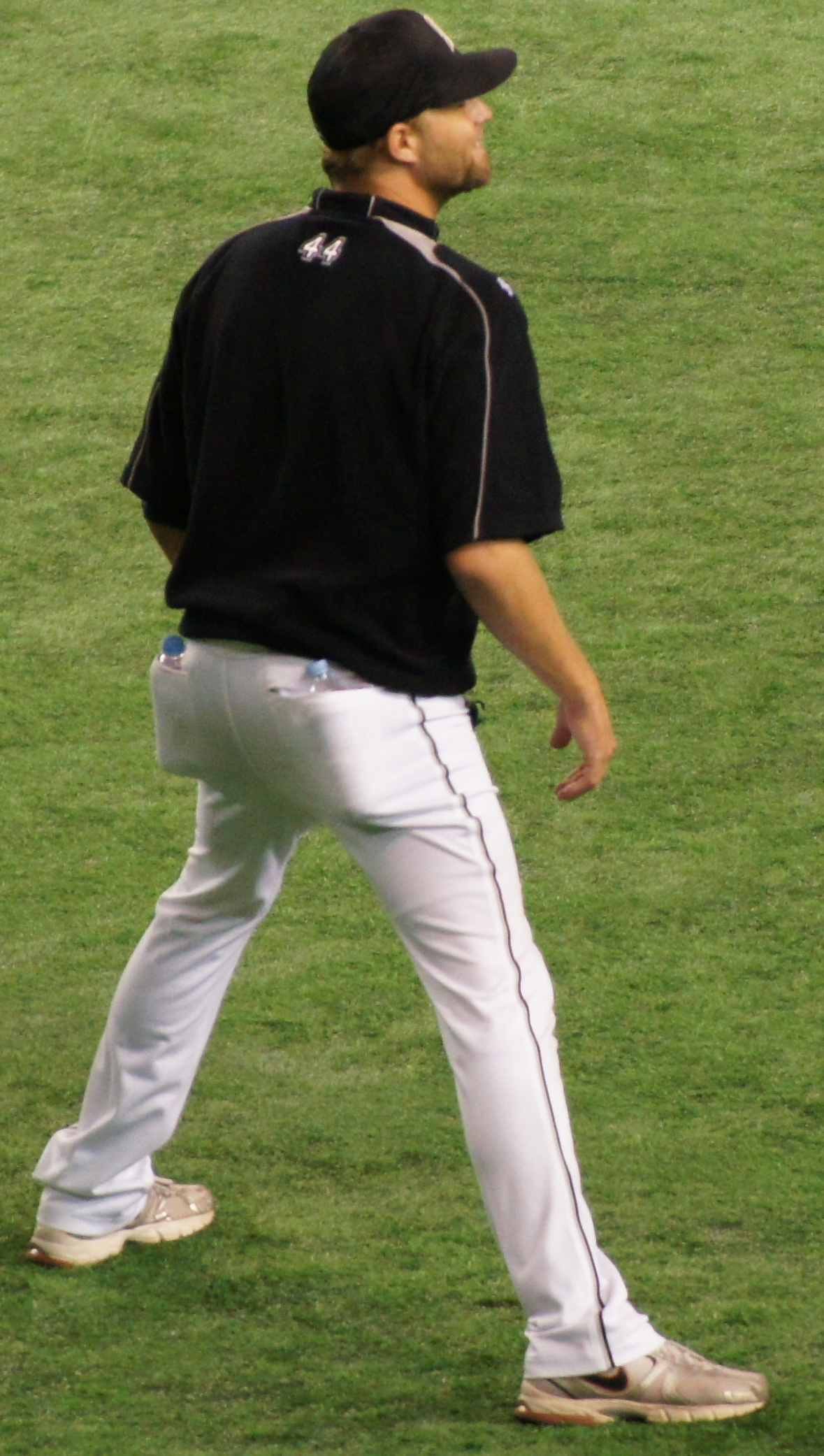
- Pitcher
- Born: October 13, 1984 (age 41); Santee, California, U.S.
- Batted: Right Threw: Right

Professional debut
- MLB: May 28, 2005, for the Baltimore Orioles
- NPB: August 8, 2010, for the Chiba Lotte Marines

Last appearance
- MLB: April 11, 2010, for the Pittsburgh Pirates
- NPB: May 2, 2012, for the Chiba Lotte Marines

MLB statistics
- Win–loss record: 4–6
- Earned run average: 9.51
- Strikeouts: 53

NPB statistics
- Win–loss record: 4–7
- Earned run average: 3.69
- Strikeouts: 57
- Stats at Baseball Reference

Teams
- Baltimore Orioles (2005–2006); Florida Marlins (2009); Pittsburgh Pirates (2010); Chiba Lotte Marines (2010–2012)

Hayden Andrew Penn (born October 13, 1984) is an American former professional baseball right-handed pitcher. He played in Major League Baseball (MLB) for the Baltimore Orioles, Florida Marlins, and Pittsburgh Pirates, and in Nippon Professional Baseball (NPB) for the Chiba Lotte Marines.

== Career ==
=== Baltimore Orioles ===
Born in Santee, California, Penn was drafted by the Baltimore Orioles in the 5th round of the 2002 Major League Baseball draft. He made his MLB debut in 2005, when he made eight starts with the Orioles, compiling a 3–2 record with a 6.34 ERA. At the time of his callup Penn was the youngest player in the Major Leagues (20 yrs, 7 months).

In May 2006, he suffered appendicitis after being called up by the Orioles and missed several months while recovering from it. He went 7–4 with an ERA of 2.26 through 14 starts for the Triple-A Ottawa Lynx in 2006 and was called up to Baltimore again when the major league rosters expanded on September 1. He made his first start of the season for Baltimore on September 3 against the Oakland Athletics; he gave up eight runs in two-thirds of an inning, for an ERA of 108.00, and took the loss.

=== Florida Marlins ===
Penn was traded to the Florida Marlins on April 1, 2009 in exchange for infielder Robert Andino. After a bad outing on June 3, the Marlins designated Penn for assignment. He cleared waivers and was assigned to the Triple-A New Orleans Zephyrs. On November 9, the Marlins purchased his contract from New Orleans and added him to their 40-man roster.

=== Pittsburgh Pirates ===
Penn was waived by the Marlins during the 2010 spring training and claimed by the Pittsburgh Pirates, making their opening day roster. He was designated for assignment on April 12, 2010 after giving up 8 runs in 2 1/3 innings pitched over 3 games, accepting an assignment to the Triple-A Indianapolis Indians.

=== Chiba Lotte Marines ===
Penn's contract was sold to the Chiba Lotte Marines of Nippon Professional Baseball during the 2010 season. He helped the Marines win the 2010 Japan Series, starting and winning Game 5 of the series. Penn did not pitch during the 2011 season after undergoing elbow surgery.

=== Bridgeport Bluefish ===
Penn played for the Bridgeport Bluefish of the Atlantic League of Professional Baseball in 2013.
