= Santee, California =

City in California, United States

- City
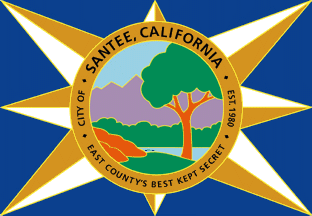
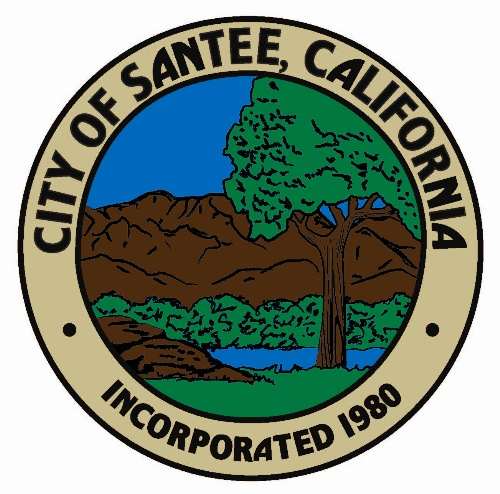
- Flag Seal
- Mottoes: Do More, Due East; East County’s Best Kept Secret; Sustainable Santee
- Interactive map of Santee, California
- Location within San Diego County Location within California Location within the United States
- Coordinates: 32°52′11″N 116°58′16″W
- Country: United States
- State: California
- County: San Diego
- Incorporated: December 1, 1980

Area
  - Total: 16.72 sq mi (43.30 km^{2})
  - Land: 16.54 sq mi (42.83 km^{2})
  - Water: 0.18 sq mi (0.47 km^{2}) 1.09%
- Elevation: 351 ft (107 m)

Population (2020)
  - Total: 60,037
  - Density: 3,631/sq mi (1,402/km^{2})
- Time zone: UTC-8 (PST)
  - Summer (DST): UTC-7 (PDT)
- ZIP codes: 92071-92072
- Area code: 619
- FIPS code: 06-70224
- GNIS feature ID: 1656619
- Website: www.cityofsanteeca.gov

Santee is a city in San Diego County, California, United States. The population was 60,037 at the 2020 census. It is a part of the East County region. The city is bisected by the San Diego River, a linear greenbelt that includes parks, trails and more than 1,100 acres (450 ha) of natural habitat.

== History ==
The region was the homeland of the Kumeyaay people. These original residents established the village of Sinyeweche on the banks of the San Diego River in the present-day Santee area.

In 1877, George A. Cowles, a pioneer rancher and businessperson, purchased 4,000 acres (1,600 ha) to develop his vineyards. The area became known as Cowlestown and was linked to the Cuyamaca Railroad. Three years after Cowles' death in 1887, his widow Jennie married Milton Santee. According to historian Harriette Wade, Jennie "lobbied hard" to rename Cowlestown to Santee in honor of her new husband, and a "reluctant vote of the citizens" approved the change in 1893.

In 1980, residents voted in favor of incorporation after voting against it three years earlier, giving rise to the city of Santee.

== Geography ==
Santee shares the northern part of a valley with the city of El Cajon. The city is bisected by the San Diego River, which flows east to west for approximately 4.2 miles (6.8 km) within the city limits. Hills form a natural barrier on its northern and western sides.

At an altitude of 1,198 feet (365 m), Rattlesnake Mountain is the highest point in Santee. Rattlesnake Mountain is home to the Sky Ranch community, and is topped with a large illuminated star during the holiday season.

=== Climate ===
According to the Köppen Climate Classification system, Santee has a semi-arid climate, abbreviated BSk on climate maps.

== Demographics ==
Historical population
Census	Pop.	Note	%±
1970	21,107		—
1980	47,080		123.1%
1990	52,902		12.4%
2000	52,975		0.1%
2010	53,413		0.8%
2020	60,037		12.4%
U.S. Decennial Census; 1860–1870 1880-1890; 1900 1910 1920; 1930 1940 1950; 1960 1970 1980; 1990 2000 2010; 2020

=== Racial and ethnic composition ===
Santee city, California – Racial and ethnic composition Note: the US Census treats Hispanic/Latino as an ethnic category. This table excludes Latinos from the racial categories and assigns them to a separate category. Hispanics/Latinos may be of any race.
Race / Ethnicity (NH = Non-Hispanic)	Pop 2000	Pop 2010	Pop 2020	% 2000	% 2010	% 2020
White alone (NH)	42,803	39,312	37,783	80.80%	73.60%	62.93%
Black or African American alone (NH)	751	971	1,265	1.42%	1.82%	2.11%
Native American or Alaska Native alone (NH)	325	290	226	0.61%	0.54%	0.38%
Asian alone (NH)	1,307	1,974	3,456	2.47%	3.70%	5.76%
Native Hawaiian or Pacific Islander alone (NH)	183	232	279	0.35%	0.43%	0.46%
Other race alone (NH)	93	81	410	0.18%	0.15%	0.68%
Mixed race or Multiracial (NH)	1,497	1,854	4,096	2.83%	3.47%	6.82%
Hispanic or Latino (any race)	6,016	8,699	12,522	11.36%	16.29%	20.86%
Total	52,975	53,413	60,037	100.00%	100.00%	100.00%

=== 2020 census ===
As of the 2020 census, Santee had a population of 60,037. The median age was 39.0 years. 22.3% of residents were under the age of 18 and 15.8% of residents were 65 years of age or older. For every 100 females there were 91.6 males, and for every 100 females age 18 and over there were 88.4 males age 18 and over.

100.0% of residents lived in urban areas, while 0.0% lived in rural areas.

There were 21,244 households in Santee, of which 35.5% had children under the age of 18 living in them. Of all households, 53.9% were married-couple households, 15.2% were households with a male householder and no spouse or partner present, and 24.8% were households with a female householder and no spouse or partner present. About 20.1% of all households were made up of individuals and 9.6% had someone living alone who was 65 years of age or older.

There were 21,848 housing units, of which 2.8% were vacant. The homeowner vacancy rate was 0.8% and the rental vacancy rate was 3.7%.

=== 2010 census ===
At the 2010 census Santee had a population of 53,413. The population density was 3,231.6 inhabitants per square mile (1,247.7/km^{2}). The racial makeup of Santee was 44,083 (82.5%) White, 1,262 (2.0%) African American, 409 (2.1%) Native American, 2,044 (3.8%) Asian (1.8% Filipino, 0.4% Chinese, 0.5% Vietnamese, 0.3% Japanese, 0.2% Korean, 0.2% Indian, 0.5% Other), 253 (0.5%) Pacific Islander, 2,677 (5.0%) from other races, and 2,890 (5.4%) from two or more races. Hispanic or Latino of any race were 8,699 persons (16.3%).

The census reported that 52,447 people (98.2% of the population) lived in households, 77 (0.1%) lived in non-institutionalized group quarters, and 889 (1.7%) were institutionalized.

There were 19,306 households, of which 7,156 (37.1%) had children under the age of 18 living in them, 10,304 (53.4%) were opposite-sex married couples living together, 2,614 (13.5%) had a female householder with no husband present, 1,157 (6.0%) had a male householder with no wife present. There were 1,135 (5.9%) unmarried opposite-sex partnerships, and 119 (0.6%) same-sex married couples or partnerships. 3,986 households (20.6%) were one person and 1,534 (7.9%) had someone living alone who was 65 or older. The average household size was 2.72. There were 14,075 families (72.9% of households); the average family size was 3.13.

The age distribution was 12,710 people (23.8%) under the age of 18, 5,068 people (9.5%) aged 18 to 24, 14,790 people (27.7%) aged 25 to 44, 15,105 people (28.3%) aged 45 to 64, and 5,740 people (10.7%) who were 65 or older. The median age was 37.2 years. For every 100 females, there were 93.6 males. For every 100 females age 18 and over, there were 90.2 males.

There were 20,048 housing units at an average density of 1,212.9 per square mile, of the occupied units 13,576 (70.3%) were owner-occupied and 5,730 (29.7%) were rented. The homeowner vacancy rate was 1.5%; the rental vacancy rate was 4.0%. 36,198 people (67.8% of the population) lived in owner-occupied housing units and 16,249 people (30.4%) lived in rental housing units.

=== 2000 census ===
As of the census of 2000, there were 52,975 people in 18,470 households, including 14,018 families, in the city. The population density was 3,298.7 inhabitants per square mile (1,273.6/km^{2}). There were 18,833 housing units at an average density of 1,172.7 units per square mile (452.8 units/km^{2}). The racial makeup of the city was 86.70% White, 1.48% African American, 0.81% Native American, 2.55% Asian, 0.41% Pacific Islander, 4.03% from other races, and 4.03% from two or more races. Hispanic or Latino of any race were 11.36% of the population.

Of the 18,470 households 40.9% had children under the age of 18 living with them, 57.7% were married couples living together, 13.0% had a female householder with no husband present, and 24.1% were non-families. 18.2% of households were one person and 6.9% were one person aged 65 or older. The average household size was 2.81 and the average family size was 3.19.

The age distribution was 28.2% under the age of 18, 8.4% from 18 to 24, 32.9% from 25 to 44, 21.6% from 45 to 64, and 8.9% 65 or older. The median age was 35 years. For every 100 females, there were 93.2 males. For every 100 females age 18 and over, there were 89.1 males.

=== 2008 estimate ===
Estimated median household income in 2008: $71,806 (up from $53,624 in 2000)

== Economy ==
Located on 15 acres (6.1 ha) in Santee is the Las Colinas Detention Facility, which serves as the primary point of intake for women prisoners in San Diego County. It began as a juvenile facility in 1967 and was converted to an adult women's institution in 1979.

== Arts and culture ==
Each summer the city hosts the Santee Summer Concerts series from mid-June to mid-August. The concerts are free to attend and are held on Thursday nights at Town Center Community Park East. The Santee Twilight Brews and Bites Festival (previously the Santee Bluegrass Festival), is held each fall to raise funds for community programs in the city.

== Parks and recreation ==
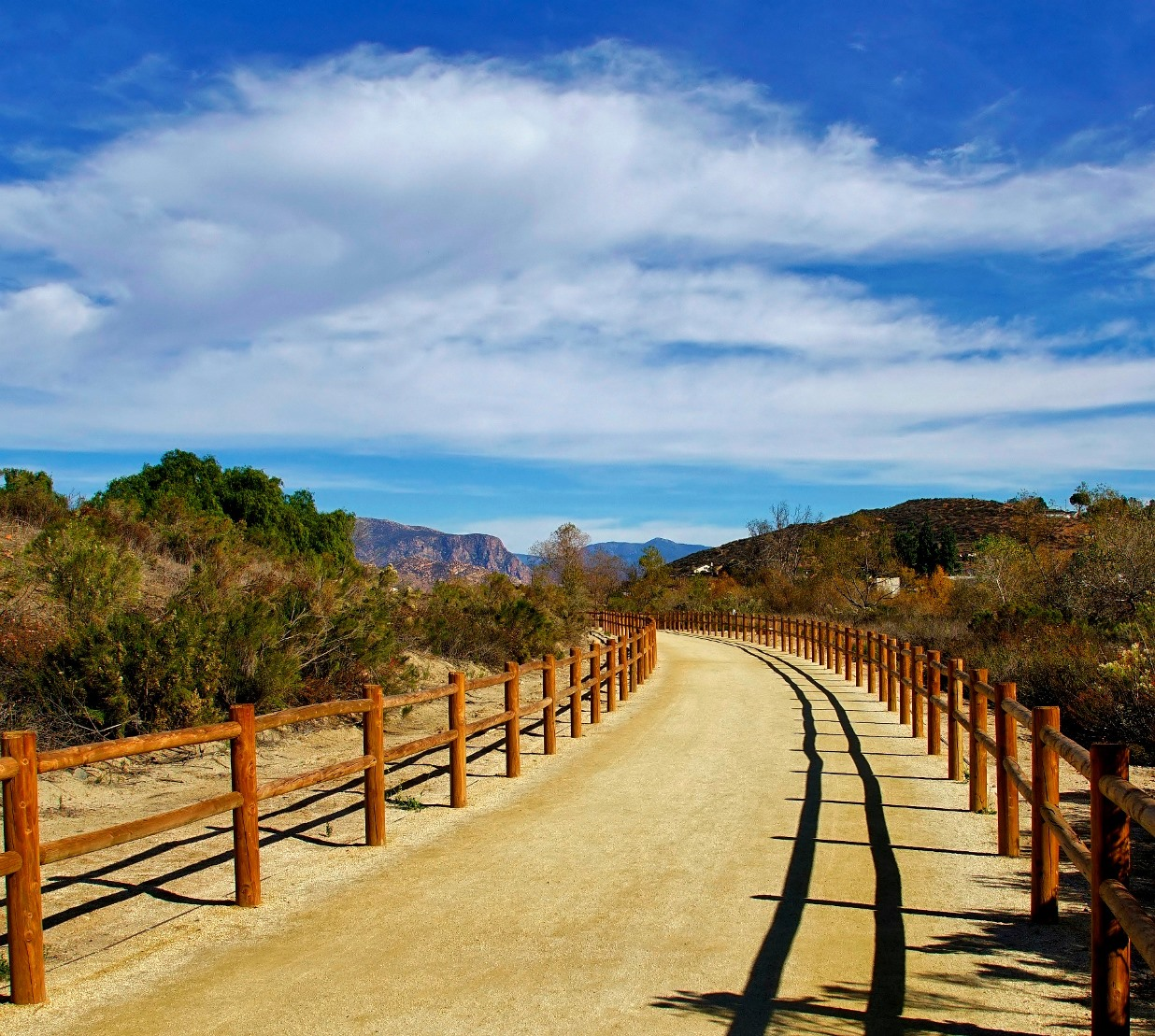
Santee opened the Walker Preserve Trail in April 2015.

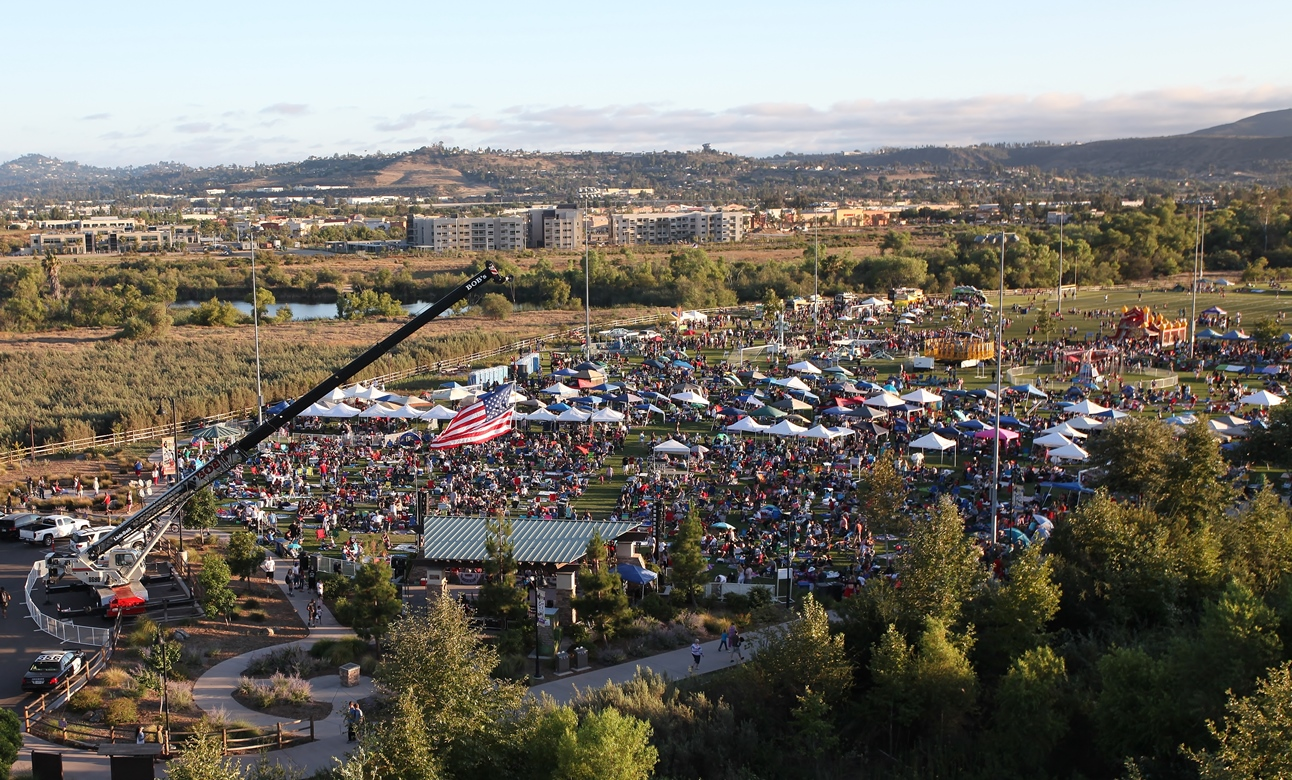
Aerial view of Santee Salutes festival in 2015

=== Parks ===
There are nine parks in the City of Santee:

- Big Rock Park
- Deputy Ken Collier Park
- Mast Park
- Shadow Hill Park
- Sky Ranch Park
- Town Center Community Park
- West Hills Park
- Woodglen Vista Park
- Weston Park

Town Center Community Park hosts many of Santee's community events including the Santee Summer Concert series and the Santee Brews and Bites Festival. The park is located along the San Diego River and is split by Wooglen Vista Creek. The east side of the park features two synthetic turf fields, two grass fields, a concession stand, a performance stage, and a 1/2-mile (0.80 km) paved trail that surrounds the fields. The west side of the park holds three youth softball fields, a batting cage and two indoor soccer fields. The park also includes the Cameron Family YMCA, the City of Santee Aquatics Center, and Sportsplex USA Santee. The Sportsplex hosts over 350,000 people per year for sports leagues and tournaments across their three baseball/softball fields and two indoor soccer fields.

In December 2018, Mast Park underwent a roughly $12M renovation that brought extensive upgrades to many of the park's amenities as well as enhancements to its public safety. The park reopened for public use on February 1, 2020, after nearly 14 months of construction. The 80-acre (32-hectare) park features 2 miles of lighted trails, a concession stand, a 9-hole disc golf course, a nature discovery area, play equipment, a lighted basketball court, and a dog park.

=== Trails ===
Walker Preserve Trail is a 1.3-mile (2.1 km) trail that runs east along the San Diego River. The trail opened in April 2015 and runs to the Lakeside Baseball Park where it continues beyond Santee's city limits into Lakeside. The trail features a decomposed granite path lined by wooden fence posts and allows fishing access to the San Diego River. It is one of several trails throughout San Diego County that is part of the San Diego River Park Foundation's vision to create a greenbelt from the mountains to the ocean along the 52-mile (84 km) long San Diego River.

Mast Park West Trail is a 1/2-mile (0.80 km) trail located between Carlton Oaks Boulevard and the Carlton Oaks Golf Course. The trail connects to Mast Park underneath Carlton Oaks Boulevard. The trail officially ends at the golf course but connecting it through the golf course to West Hills Parkway and Mission Trails Regional Park is one of the San Diego River Park Foundation's priority projects. SANDAG is leading the project and has completed the required environmental work but has made no further progress.

=== Recreation ===
Santee Lakes Recreation Preserve is a 190-acre (77 ha) park for fishing, camping, bird watching, and picnicking. The park features seven recycled water lakes stocked with sports fish year-round and 300 full-hook-up campsites. The park is owned and operated by Padre Dam Municipal Water District.

Carlton Oaks Golf Course and Lodge features an 18-hole championship course designed by golf course design legend Pete Dye as well as a 51-room resort. The course hosted the NCAA Western Region Finals and NCAA Championship in 1974.

Santee has a World Athletics certified 1-km Race Walking course on Riverview Parkway and Town Center Parkway. This course has hosted the US Olympic Trials for the 50k racewalk in 2012, 2016, and 2020, in addition to several USATF Race Walk Championships.

== Government ==
As of 2026, the Santee City Council was composed of Mayor John Minto, Vice Mayor Ronn Hall, and council members Laura Koval, and Rob McNelis Dustin Trotter.

=== State and federal representation ===
In the California State Legislature, Santee is in the 40th senatorial district, represented by Republican Brian Jones, and in the 75th Assembly district, represented by Republican Carl DeMaio.

In the United States House of Representatives, Santee is in California's 48th congressional district, represented by Republican Darrell Issa.

== Education ==
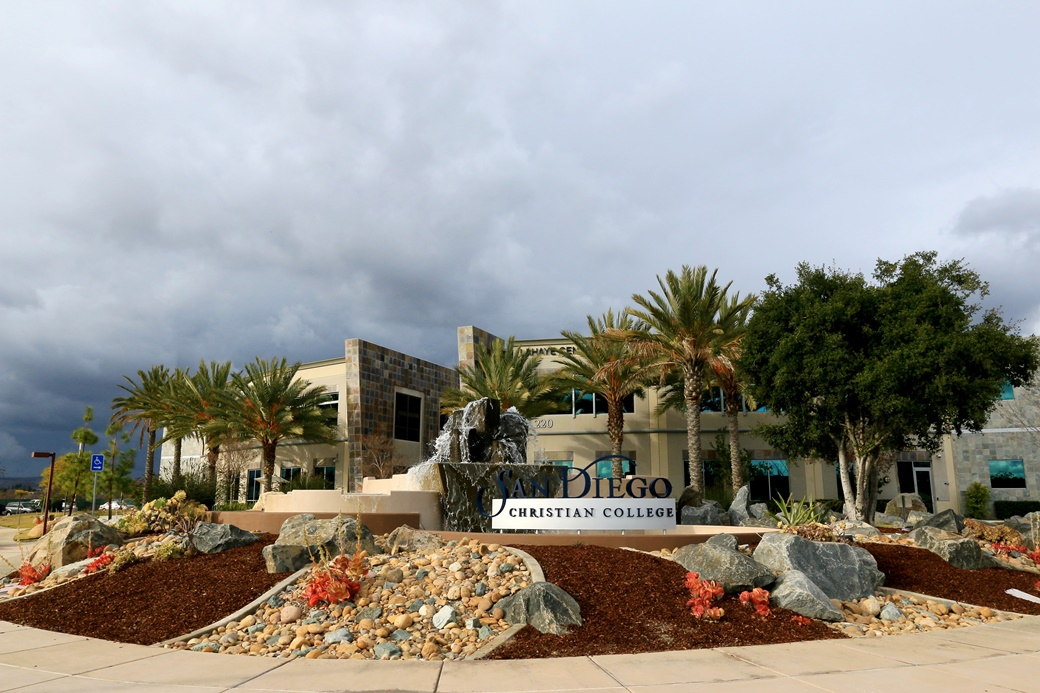
San Diego Christian College relocated to Santee in 2013.

San Diego Christian College moved to Santee from El Cajon in early 2013. The college, which offers 15 degree programs, is accredited by the Western Association of Schools and Colleges. The college has approximately 475 students and 28 faculty members, but hopes to expand to as many as 1,200 students.

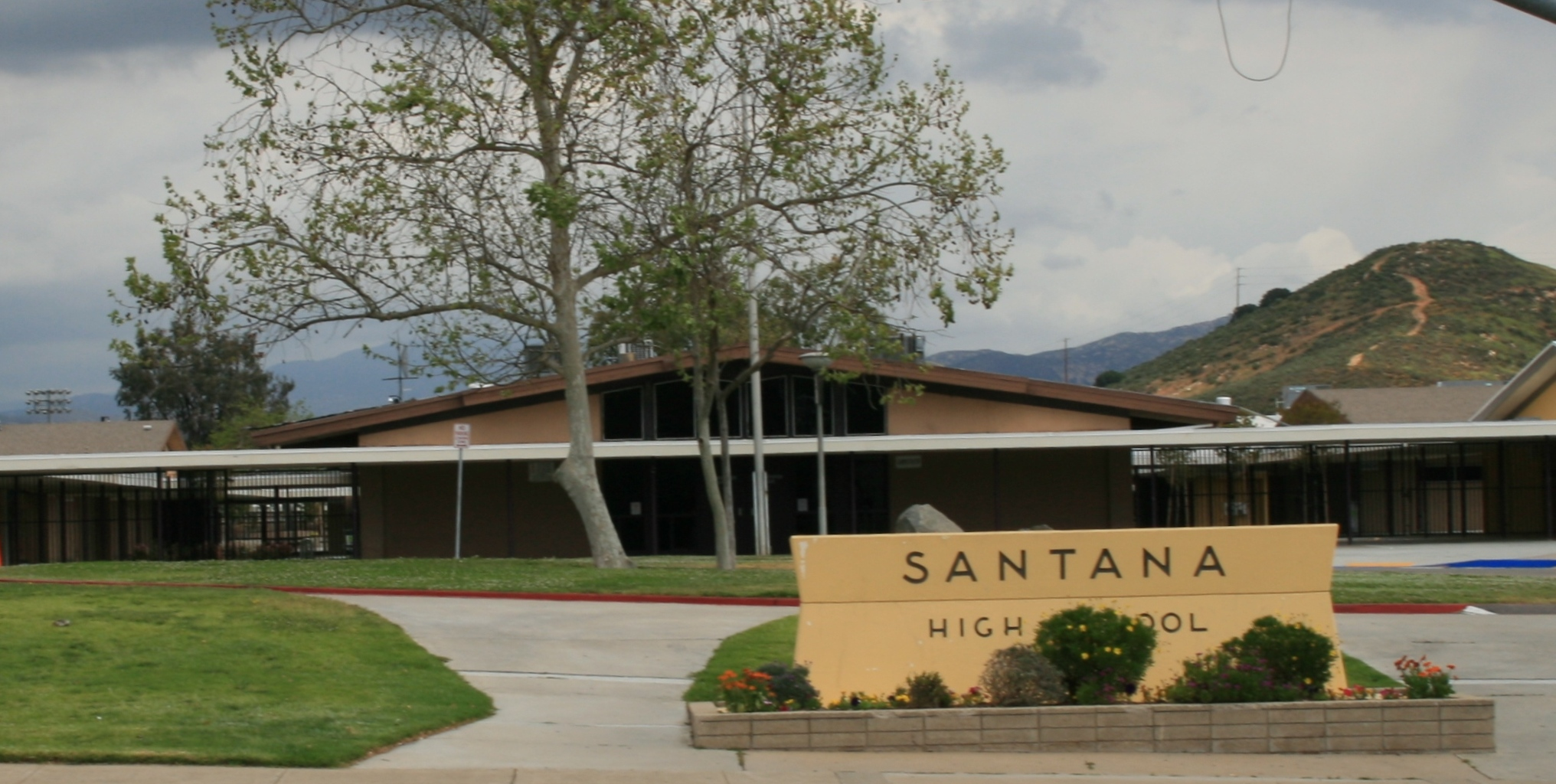
Santana High School

Santee is served by two school districts: Santee School District and Grossmont Union High School District. The two high schools in Santee, West Hills High School and Santana High School, are both part of the Grossmont Union High School District. Elementary and middle schools are part of the Santee School District. Other than Sycamore Canyon (only K-6), each school campus serves kindergarten through eighth grade (K-8). The schools are divided into elementary (K-6) and junior high (7–8), with each using different parts of the campus and having different ending times. This is different from the traditional practice of smaller elementary schools that feed students into consolidated middle schools.

=== Elementary and middle school campuses ===
- Cajon Park School
- Carlton Hills School
- Carlton Oaks School
- Chet F. Harritt School
- Hill Creek School
- Pepper Drive School
- Pride Academy at Prospect Avenue School
- Rio Seco School
- Sycamore Canyon School

=== High schools ===
There are two high schools in Santee. Both are part of the Grossmont Union High School District.

- Santana High School
- West Hills High School

On March 5, 2001, 15-year-old Charles Andrew Williams opened fire in a boys' bathroom and a grass quad area at Santana High School. Two students died and thirteen students were wounded. He pleaded guilty to the shooting and was sentenced to 50 years to life in prison.

== Infrastructure ==
=== Transportation ===
State Route 52 was extended eastward through the city from its former terminus at State Route 125 to State Route 67 on the city's east side. The city is bisected by four main thoroughfares: Mast Boulevard and Mission Gorge Road traverse east and west, while Magnolia Avenue and Cuyamaca Street cross north and south. Santee also is the northeastern terminus of the San Diego Metropolitan Transit System (MTS) Copper Line trolley route, which connects Santee to El Cajon, where it connects to the Green Line and Orange Line which connect East County to Old Town and downtown San Diego. MTS also provides bus service. Gillespie Field, the oldest and largest of eight commercial aviation airports operated by San Diego County, is located on Santee's southern border with the city of El Cajon. The airport serves as a hub for local businesses.

== Notable people ==
- Joe Davenport, MLB pitcher, Chicago White Sox, Colorado Rockies
- Sharon Ryer Davis, wife of former California Gov. Gray Davis, was raised in the city and crowned Miss Santee in 1968.
- Brian Jones, politician serving in the California State Senate
- Mega64, Internet sketch comedy group consisting of Rocco Botte, Derrick Acosta, and Shawn Chatfield
- Hayden Penn, MLB pitcher, Baltimore Orioles, Florida Marlins, Pittsburgh Pirates
- Dat Phan, stand-up comedian, Last Comic Standing winner (season 1)
- Randy Voepel, politician
- William Wall, filmmaker
