= Rancho San Jacinto =

Rancho San Jacinto may refer to:

- Rancho San Jacinto Nuevo y Potrero
- Rancho San Jacinto Sobrante
- Rancho San Jacinto Viejo
- Rancho San Jacinto y San Gorgonio
