= El Cajon, California =

City in California, United States

El Cajon, California El Cajón
- City
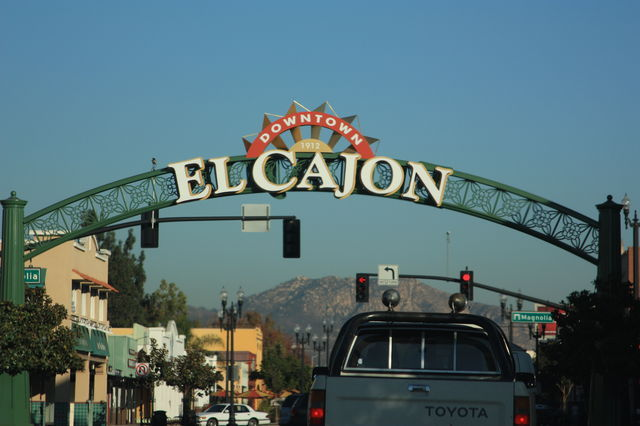

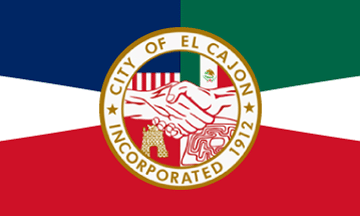
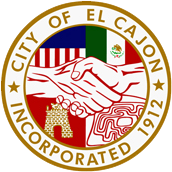
- Flag Seal
- Motto: "The Valley of Opportunity"
- Interactive map of El Cajon, California
- Location in the United States
- Coordinates: 32°47′54″N 116°57′36″W
- Country: United States
- State: California
- County: San Diego
- Incorporated: November 12, 1912

Government
  - Mayor: Bill Wells

Area
  - Total: 14.51 sq mi (37.58 km^{2})
  - Land: 14.51 sq mi (37.58 km^{2})
  - Water: 0 sq mi (0.00 km^{2}) 0%
- Elevation: 433 ft (132 m)

Population (2020)
  - Total: 106,215
  - Rank: 70th in California; 326th in the United States
  - Density: 7,320/sq mi (2,826/km^{2})
- Time zone: UTC−8 (Pacific)
  - Summer (DST): UTC−7 (PDT)
- ZIP Codes: 92019–92022, 92090
- Area code: 619
- FIPS code: 06-21712
- GNIS feature IDs: 1652701, 2410406
- Website: www.elcajon.gov

El Cajon (/ɛl kəˈhoʊn/ el kə-HOHN, Spanish pronunciation: [el kaˈxon]; Spanish: El Cajón, lit. 'the box') is a city in San Diego County, California, United States, 17 mi (27 km) east of downtown San Diego. The city takes its name from Rancho El Cajón, which was named for the box-like shape of the valley that surrounds the city, and the origin of the city's common nickname "the Box".

As of the 2020 census, El Cajon had a population of 106,215.

== Name ==
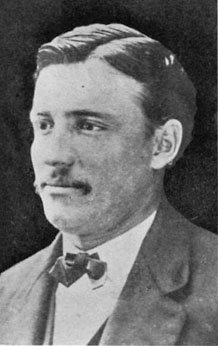
El Cajon takes its name from Rancho El Cajón, which was owned by the family of Don Miguel de Pedrorena, a Californio ranchero and signer of the California Constitution.

El Cajón, Spanish for "The Drawer", was first recorded on September 10, 1821, as an alternative name for sitio rancho Santa Mónica to describe the "boxed-in" nature of the valley in which it sat. The name appeared on maps in 1873 and 1875, shortened to "Cajon", until the modern town developed, in which the post office was named "El Cajon".

In 1905, the name was once again expanded to "El Cajon" under the insistence of California banker and historian Zoeth Skinner Eldredge.

== History ==
During Spanish rule (1769–1821), the government encouraged settlement of territory now known as California by the establishment of large land grants called ranchos, from which the English word ranch is derived. Land grants were made to the Roman Catholic Church, which set up numerous missions throughout the region. In the early 19th century, mission padres' search for pastureland led them to the El Cajon Valley. Surrounding foothills served as a barrier to straying cattle and a watershed to gather the sparse rainfall. For years, the pasturelands of El Cajon supported the cattle herds of the mission and its native Indian converts.

Titles to plots of land were not granted to individuals until the Mexican era (1821–1846). The original intent of the 1834 secularization legislation was to have church property divided among the former mission Indians, but most of the grants were actually made to rich "Californios" of Spanish background who had long been casting envious eyes on the vast holdings of the Roman Catholic missions. In 1845, California Governor Pio Pico confiscated the lands of Mission San Diego de Alcala. He granted 11 square leagues (about 48,800 acres or 19,700 ha) of the El Cajon Valley to Dona Maria Antonio Estudillo, daughter of José Antonio Estudillo, alcalde of San Diego, to repay a $500 government obligation. The grant was originally called Rancho Santa Monica and encompassed present-day El Cajon, Bostonia, Santee, Lakeside, Flinn Springs, and the eastern part of La Mesa. It also contained the 28-acre (11 ha) Rancho Cañada de los Coches grant. Maria Estudillo was the wife of Don Miguel Pedrorena (1808–1850), a native of Madrid, Spain, who had come to California from Peru in 1838 to operate a trading business.

With the cession of California to the United States after the Mexican–American War, the 1848 Treaty of Guadalupe Hidalgo provided that the land grants would be honored. As required by the Land Act of 1851, a claim for Rancho El Cajon was filed by Thomas W. Sutherland, guardian of Pedrorena's heirs (his son, Miguel, and his three daughters, Victoria, Ysabel, and Elenain) with the Public Land Commission in 1852, confirmed by the U.S. Supreme Court, and the grant was patented in 1876. In 1868, Los Angeles land developer Isaac Lankershim bought the bulk of the Pedrorena's Rancho El Cajon holdings and employed Major Levi Chase, a former Union Army officer, as his agent. Chase received from Lankershim 7,624 acres (3,090 ha) known as the Chase Ranch. Lankershim hired Amaziah Lord Knox (1833–1918), a New Englander whom he had met in San Francisco, to manage Rancho El Cajon. In 1876, Knox established a hotel there to serve the growing number of people traveling between San Diego and Julian, where gold had been discovered in 1869. Room and board for a guest and horse cost $1 a night. The area became known as Knox's Corners but was later renamed. By 1878 there were 25 families living in the valley, and a portion of the hotel lobby became the valley post office with Knox as the first postmaster. The San Diego, Cuyamaca and Eastern Railway reached El Cajon in the 1880s.

El Cajon was incorporated as a city in 1912. For the first half of the 20th century, El Cajon was known for its grape, avocado, and citrus agriculture.

In the 1960s and 1970s, Frontier Town, Big Oak Ranch, was a tourist attraction, featuring a typical frontier-town theme park and a periodic simulated shootout. The park closed around 1980 and is being used for residential housing.

Cajon Speedway was a 70-acre race track (28 ha) that operated from 1961 to 2005. It was founded by Earle Brucker Jr. of the El Cajon Stock Car Racing Association. One of his sons, Steve Brucker, later took over ownership of the track. Although the speedway closed after the death of Steve Brucker, it is now a historic museum featuring the original entrance sign with the slogan "The fastest 3/8-mile paved oval in the West."

== Geography ==
According to the United States Census Bureau, the city has a total area of 14.4 square miles (37 km^{2}), all land. It is bordered by San Diego and La Mesa on the west, Spring Valley on the south, Santee on the north, and unincorporated San Diego County on the east. It includes the neighborhoods of Fletcher Hills, Bostonia, and Rancho San Diego.

=== Climate ===
Under the Köppen climate classification, El Cajon straddles areas of Mediterranean climate (Csa), hot semi-arid climate (BSh) and cool semi-arid climate (BSk). As a result, it is often described as "arid Mediterranean" and "semiarid steppe". Like most inland areas in Southern California, the climate varies dramatically within a short distance, known as microclimate. El Cajon's climate has greater extremes compared to coastal San Diego. The farther east from the coast, the more arid the climate gets, until one reaches the mountains, where precipitation increases due to orographic uplift.

Temperature variations between night and day tend to be moderate with an average difference of 24 °F (13 °C) during the summer, and an average difference of 26 °F (14 °C) during the winter.

The annual average precipitation at El Cajon is 11.63 inches (295.4 mm). Rainfall is fairly evenly distributed throughout the winter, but rare in summer. The wettest month of the year is February with an average rainfall of 2.61 inches (66 mm).

The record high temperature was 114 °F (45.6 °C) on September 5, 2020, and the record low 19 °F (−7.2 °C) on January 8, 1913. The wettest "rain year" was from July 1940 to June 1941 with 30.08 inches or 764.0 millimeters and the driest from July 1988 to June 1989 with 2.38 inches or 60.5 millimeters. The most rainfall in one month was 11.43 inches or 290.3 millimeters in January 1993, and the most in 24 hours 5.60 inches or 142.2 millimeters on January 27, 1916. A rare snowfall in November 1992 totalled 0.3 inches (0.76 cm). Three inches or 7.6 centimeters of snow covered the ground in January 1882.

Climate data for El Cajon, California (1991–2020 normals, extremes 1979–present)
Month	Jan	Feb	Mar	Apr	May	Jun	Jul	Aug	Sep	Oct	Nov	Dec	Year
Record high °F (°C)	93 (34)	95 (35)	101 (38)	104 (40)	104 (40)	107 (42)	113 (45)	107 (42)	114 (46)	106 (41)	99 (37)	93 (34)	114 (46)
Mean maximum °F (°C)	83.8 (28.8)	84.3 (29.1)	86.8 (30.4)	91.1 (32.8)	92.0 (33.3)	94.0 (34.4)	98.7 (37.1)	100.4 (38.0)	102.5 (39.2)	97.7 (36.5)	90.9 (32.7)	82.0 (27.8)	104.8 (40.4)
Mean daily maximum °F (°C)	69.3 (20.7)	69.2 (20.7)	71.3 (21.8)	74.5 (23.6)	76.2 (24.6)	80.8 (27.1)	86.1 (30.1)	88.6 (31.4)	87.3 (30.7)	81.0 (27.2)	75.2 (24.0)	68.5 (20.3)	77.3 (25.2)
Daily mean °F (°C)	55.9 (13.3)	56.8 (13.8)	59.7 (15.4)	62.6 (17.0)	66.1 (18.9)	70.1 (21.2)	74.7 (23.7)	76.6 (24.8)	74.7 (23.7)	68.3 (20.2)	61.2 (16.2)	55.1 (12.8)	65.1 (18.4)
Mean daily minimum °F (°C)	42.5 (5.8)	44.4 (6.9)	48.0 (8.9)	50.7 (10.4)	55.9 (13.3)	59.4 (15.2)	63.3 (17.4)	64.7 (18.2)	62.1 (16.7)	55.6 (13.1)	47.1 (8.4)	41.7 (5.4)	53.0 (11.7)
Mean minimum °F (°C)	33.1 (0.6)	36.0 (2.2)	39.3 (4.1)	43.0 (6.1)	48.8 (9.3)	53.4 (11.9)	57.5 (14.2)	58.8 (14.9)	54.2 (12.3)	45.5 (7.5)	37.2 (2.9)	32.3 (0.2)	31.2 (−0.4)
Record low °F (°C)	26 (−3)	28 (−2)	30 (−1)	36 (2)	43 (6)	46 (8)	50 (10)	50 (10)	49 (9)	35 (2)	29 (−2)	25 (−4)	25 (−4)
Average precipitation inches (mm)	2.32 (59)	2.61 (66)	1.92 (49)	0.75 (19)	0.30 (7.6)	0.06 (1.5)	0.16 (4.1)	0.02 (0.51)	0.11 (2.8)	0.54 (14)	1.01 (26)	1.83 (46)	11.63 (295)
Average precipitation days (≥ 0.01 in)	5.6	7.0	5.1	3.5	2.2	0.6	0.6	0.4	0.6	1.7	3.4	5.5	36.2
Source: NOAA

== Demographics ==
Historical population
Census	Pop.	Note	%±
1920	469		—
1930	1,050		123.9%
1940	1,471		40.1%
1950	5,600		280.7%
1960	37,618		571.8%
1970	52,273		39.0%
1980	73,892		41.4%
1990	88,693		20.0%
2000	94,869		7.0%
2010	99,478		4.9%
2020	106,215		6.8%
U.S. Decennial Census; 1860–1870 1880-1890; 1900 1910 1920; 1930 1940 1950; 1960 1970 1980; 1990 2000 2010; 2020

=== 2022 ===
As of the 2022 American Community Survey estimates, there were 104,417 people and 33,580 households. The population density was 7,196.2 inhabitants per square mile (2,778.5/km^{2}). There were 34,370 housing units at an average density of 2,368.7 per square mile (914.6/km^{2}). The racial makeup of the city was 50.6% White, 15.0% some other race, 5.6% Black or African American, 3.4% Asian, 1.3% Native American or Alaskan Native, and 1.3% Native Hawaiian or Other Pacific Islander, with 22.8% from two or more races. Hispanic or Latino residents of any race were 36.6% of the population.

Of the 33,580 households, 34.2% had children under the age of 18 living with them, 32.9% had seniors 65 years or older living with them, 52.4% were married couples living together, 4.8% were couples cohabitating, 16.8% had a male householder with no partner present, and 26.0% had a female householder with no partner present. The median household size was 3.00 and the median family size was 3.53.

The age distribution was 25.9% under 18, 8.1% from 18 to 24, 25.2% from 25 to 44, 25.6% from 45 to 64, and 15.3% who were 65 or older. The median age was 37.4 years. For every 100 females, there were 88.1 males.

The median income for a household was $66,045, with family households having a median income of $72,704 and non-family households $43,584. The per capita income was $28,221. Out of the 102,390 people with a determined poverty status, 22.7% were below the poverty line. Further, 31.4% of minors and 17.3% of seniors were below the poverty line.

In the survey, residents self-identified with various ethnic ancestries. People of Arab descent made up 5% of the population of the town, followed by German at 6.7%, English at 5.8%, Irish at 4.3%, Italian at 3.0%, American at 2.4%, Sub-Saharan African at 1.9%, Polish at 1.7%, Norwegian at 1.4%, Swedish at 1.0%, French at 0.9%, Dutch at 0.8%, Hungarian at 0.8%, Scottish at 0.6%, Greek at 0.5%, Portuguese at 0.5%, and Czech at 0.5%.

=== 2020 census ===
El Cajon city, California – Racial and ethnic composition Note: the US Census treats Hispanic/Latino as an ethnic category. This table excludes Latinos from the racial categories and assigns them to a separate category. Hispanics/Latinos may be of any race.
Race / Ethnicity (NH = Non-Hispanic)	Pop 2000	Pop 2010	Pop 2020	% 2000	% 2010	% 2020
White alone (NH)	61,188	56,462	56,116	64.50%	56.76%	52.83%
Black or African American alone (NH)	4,828	5,939	6,664	5.09%	5.97%	6.27%
Native American or Alaska Native alone (NH)	661	455	328	0.70%	0.46%	0.31%
Asian alone (NH)	2,511	3,375	5,006	2.65%	3.39%	4.71%
Native Hawaiian or Pacific Islander alone (NH)	331	440	418	0.35%	0.44%	0.39%
Other Race alone (NH)	181	261	613	0.19%	0.26%	0.58%
Mixed race or Multiracial (NH)	3,856	4,510	5,799	4.06%	4.53%	5.46%
Hispanic or Latino (any race)	21,313	28,036	31,271	22.47%	28.18%	29.44%
Total	94,869	99,478	106,215	100.00%	100.00%	100.00%

=== 2010 ===
The 2010 United States census reported that El Cajon had a population of 99,478. The racial makeup of El Cajon was 43,746 (41.6%) White, 6,306 (6.3%) African American, 835 (0.8%) Native American, 3,561 (3.6%) Asian (1.7% Filipino, 0.5% Chinese, 0.4% Vietnamese, 0.2% Japanese, 0.1% Indian, 0.1% Korean, 0.6% other), 495 (0.5%) Pacific Islander, 26,498 (26.6%) from other races, and 6,832 (6.9%) from two or more races. There were 31,542 Hispanic or Latino residents of any race (30.4%).

About one-third of El Cajon residents were foreign-born. In particular, the city has a large Iraqi immigrant population, consisting of both Arabs and Chaldean Catholics; both groups are among the largest such communities in the country. According to the U.S. Census Bureau 2008-2010 Estimate, 7,537 residents self identify as Arabs (7.6%; mainly Iraqi), and 6,409 (6.4%) are Chaldean Catholic Assyrians. In 2017, a spokesperson for the city of El Cajon estimated that 15,000 to 20,000 Chaldo-Assyrians live in the city.

In 2010, El Cajon had the highest poverty rate in San Diego County among adults, 29.7%, and for children, 36.5%.

=== 2000 ===
As of the census of 2000, 94,869 people, 34,199 households, and 23,152 families were residing in the city. The population density was 6,510.6 inhabitants per square mile (2,513.8/km^{2}). There were 35,190 housing units at an average density of 2,415.0 per square mile (932.4/km^{2}). The racial makeup of the city was 42.9% White, 5.4% African American, 1.0% Native American, 2.8% Asian, 0.4% Pacific Islander, 24.1% from other races], and 6.0% from two or more races. Hispanic or Latino residents of any race were 29.2% of the population.

Of the 34,199 households, 37.0% had children under 18 living with them, 46.0% were married couples living together, 16.0% had a female householder with no husband present, and 32.3% were not families. About 24.1% of all households were made up of individuals, and 8.5% had someone living alone who was 65 or older. The average household size was 2.70, and the average family size was 3.21.

In the city, the age distribution was 27.9% under 18, 11.2% from 18 to 24, 31.3% from 25 to 44, 18.3% from 45 to 64, and 11.3% who were 65 or older. The median age was 32 years. For every 100 females, there were 95.2 males. For every 100 females 18 and over, there were 91.4 males.

The median income for a household in the city was $35,566, and for a family was $40,045. Males had a median income of $32,498 versus $25,320 for females. The per capita income for the city was $16,698. About 13.5% of families and 16.7% of the population were below the poverty line, including 23.1% of those under age 18 and 9.0% of those age 65 or over.

=== Household income ===
According to estimates by the San Diego Association of Governments, the median household income of El Cajon in 2005 was $47,885 (not adjusted for inflation). When adjusted for inflation (1999 dollars; comparable to Census data above), the median household income was $38,884.

=== Ethnic groups ===
As of 2012, it had an estimated 40,000 Iraqi Americans. Included are members of different religious and ethnic groups originating from Iraq. The Iran–Iraq War prompted the first immigration, and it continued due to the Persian Gulf War and then the U.S. Invasion of Iraq and the resulting conflict.

== Government ==
Until 2012, El Cajon was a general law city operating under a council-manager system. In June 2012, the voters adopted a city charter, changing its status to chartered city. El Cajon is governed by a five-member city council, on which the mayor also sits. Starting in 2018, four councilmembers are elected from single-member districts and the mayor is elected at-large.

On October 24, 2013, Mayor Mark Lewis resigned his position after coming under criticism for remarks he made about El Cajon's Chaldo-Assyrian community. Many notable figures including Congressman Juan Vargas and Neighborhood Market Association President Mark Arabo called for his resignation. Lewis resigned shortly after due to health issues. On November 12, the city council appointed Councilman Bill Wells, who had been serving as mayor pro tem. The vote of the council was 4–0; Wells recused himself. He was elected to a full four-year term as mayor in November 2014 and re-elected in November 2018 and November 2022.

In 2025, councilmembers were Gary Kendrick (district 1), Michelle Metschel (district 2), Steve Goble (district 3), and Phil Ortiz (district 4). All council terms end in December 2028 except for Kendrick's, which ends in December 2026.

El Cajon's city manager is Graham Mitchell.

=== State and federal representation ===
In the California State Legislature, El Cajon is in the 39th senatorial district, represented by Democrat Akilah Weber Pierson. The northern half of the city is in the 78th Assembly district, represented by Democrat Chris Ward, and the southern half of the city is in the 79th Assembly district, represented by Democrat LaShae Sharp-Collins.

In the United States House of Representatives, El Cajon is in California's 51st congressional district, represented by Democrat Sara Jacobs.

== Economy ==
According to the city's 2025 Annual Comprehensive Financial Report, the top employers in the city are:

No.	Employer	No. of Employees
1	Cajon Valley Union School District	2,164
2	Grossmont–Cuyamaca Community College District	1,460
3	GKN Aerospace Chem-tronics	893
4	Grossmont Union High School District	735
5	Kaiser Permanente	591
6	University Mechanical and Engineering Contractors	448
7	City of El Cajon	406
8	Avocado Post Acute	396
9	Taylor Guitars	387
10	Country Hills Health Care	361

The Parkway Plaza shopping mall is located in El Cajon.

== Education ==
Cajon Valley Union School District operates public elementary and middle schools. Grossmont Union High School District operates public high schools.

=== Public elementary schools ===
- Anza Elementary
- Avocado Elementary
- Blossom Valley Elementary
- Bostonia Elementary
- Chase Avenue Elementary
- Crest Elementary
- Dehesa School
- Fletcher Hills Elementary
- Flying Hills Elementary
- Fuerte Elementary
- Jamacha Elementary
- Johnson Elementary
- Lexington Elementary
- Madison Elementary
- Magnolia Elementary
- Meridian Elementary
- Naranca Elementary
- Rancho San Diego Elementary
- Rios Elementary
- Vista Grande Elementary
- W.D. Hall Elementary

=== Public middle schools ===
- Cajon Valley Middle School
- Greenfield Middle School
- Hillsdale Middle School
- Los Coches Creek Middle School
- Montgomery Middle School

=== Public high schools ===
- Chaparral High School
- El Cajon Valley High School
- Granite Hills High School
- Grossmont High School
- Grossmont Middle College High School
- IDEA Center High School
- Valhalla High School
- Steele Canyon High School

=== Private schools ===
- Christian High School
- Foothills Christian Schools (Preschool, middle school, and high school campuses)

=== Colleges ===
- Advanced Training
- Cuyamaca College
- Grossmont College
- San Diego Christian College
- Seminary of Mar Abba the Great of the Chaldean Catholic Church

== Places of interest ==
=== Annual events ===
On a Saturday in May, the city celebrates its diversity with a free family-friendly event called "America on Main Street". The festival replaces a previous city-sponsored event called the International Friendship Festival, which ran from 1991 to 2003. Both festivals highlight the city's identity as a "mini-United Nations", with 30% of its population being immigrants from Iraq, Somalia, Syria, Turkey, and other countries.

El Cajon's annual Mother Goose Parade has been held on the Sunday before Thanksgiving every year since 1946. Organizers claim it is the largest parade in San Diego County. It features more than 100 entries, including "motorized floats, marching bands and drill units, equestrians, clowns, performing artists, giant helium balloons, specialty vehicles, and Santa Claus."

=== Visitor attractions ===
Visitor attractions in and around El Cajon include the Water Conservation Garden and Butterfly Garden at Cuyamaca College, Sycuan Casino, Summers Past Farms, and the Parkway Plaza Mall.

Downtown El Cajon includes The Magnolia, a City-owned entertainment venue in partnership with Live Nation Entertainment, St. Madeleine Sophie's Center and Garden that serves adults with intellectual and developmental disabilities, and the Olaf Weighost Museum and Western Heritage Center which features items from the 40 years that Olaf Wieghorst lived in El Cajon.

== Transportation ==
=== Bus and train ===
- El Cajon Transit Center
- San Diego and Imperial Valley Railroad
- San Diego Trolley

=== Airports ===
- Gillespie Field

== Notable people ==
- Lester Bangs, Rolling Stone rock critic
- William Bengen, certified financial planner who proposed the 4 percent draw-down rule in retirement planning
- Kurt Bevacqua, former Major League Baseball player
- Aaron Boone, former Major League Baseball player
- Bob Boone, former Major League Baseball player
- Bret Boone, former Major League Baseball player
- Edward Castro, serial killer executed by lethal injection in Florida in 2000
- Tony Clark, former Major League Baseball player
- Kevin Correia, former Major League Baseball player
- William John Cox (Billy Jack Cox), public interest attorney, political activist, El Cajon police officer 1962-68
- Mike Davis, Marxist writer and political activist
- Dave Dravecky, former Major League Baseball player
- Amy Finley, host of The Gourmet Next Door on Food Network Channel
- Geoff Geary, former Major League Baseball player
- Brian Giles, former Major League Baseball player
- Marcus Giles, former Major League Baseball player
- Broc Glover, professional motocross racer
- Brian Graham, former Minor League Baseball player
- A.J. Griffin, current Major League Baseball player
- Ryan Hansen, actor
- Mike Hartley, former Major League Baseball player
- Nikki Hornsby, musician
- David Jeremiah, Christian minister
- Jimmie Johnson, seven-time NASCAR Cup Series champion
- Ricky Johnson, motocross racer
- Joe Kennedy, former Major League Baseball player
- Jean Landis, aviator
- David Lee, volleyball Olympic gold medalist
- Darrell Long, noted American Computer Scientist and Engineer
- Greg Louganis, Olympic diver, 1984 and 1988 gold medalist
- Mark Malone, former NFL football player and sportscaster
- Glen Morgan, film director
- Joe Musgrove, current Major League Baseball player
- Swen Nater, former NBA basketball player
- Alfred Olango, shooting victim
- Grant Roberts, former Major League Baseball player
- Thomas Shultz, United States Navy rear admiral
- Brian Sipe, former NFL football player
- Shane Spencer, former Major League Baseball player
- Kyle Stowers, Current Major League Baseball player
- Tommy Vardell, former NFL football player
- Brandon Whitt, former NASCAR driver
- Olaf Wieghorst, Western artist
- Katie Wilkins, Team USA Olympic volleyball player
- James Wong, television producer
- Frank Zappa, musician
- Barry Zito, former Major League Baseball player
