= Advanced Training =

Private college in El Cajon, California, US

Coordinates: 32°49′18″N 116°58′57″W

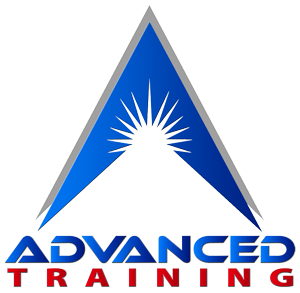
Advanced Training Logo

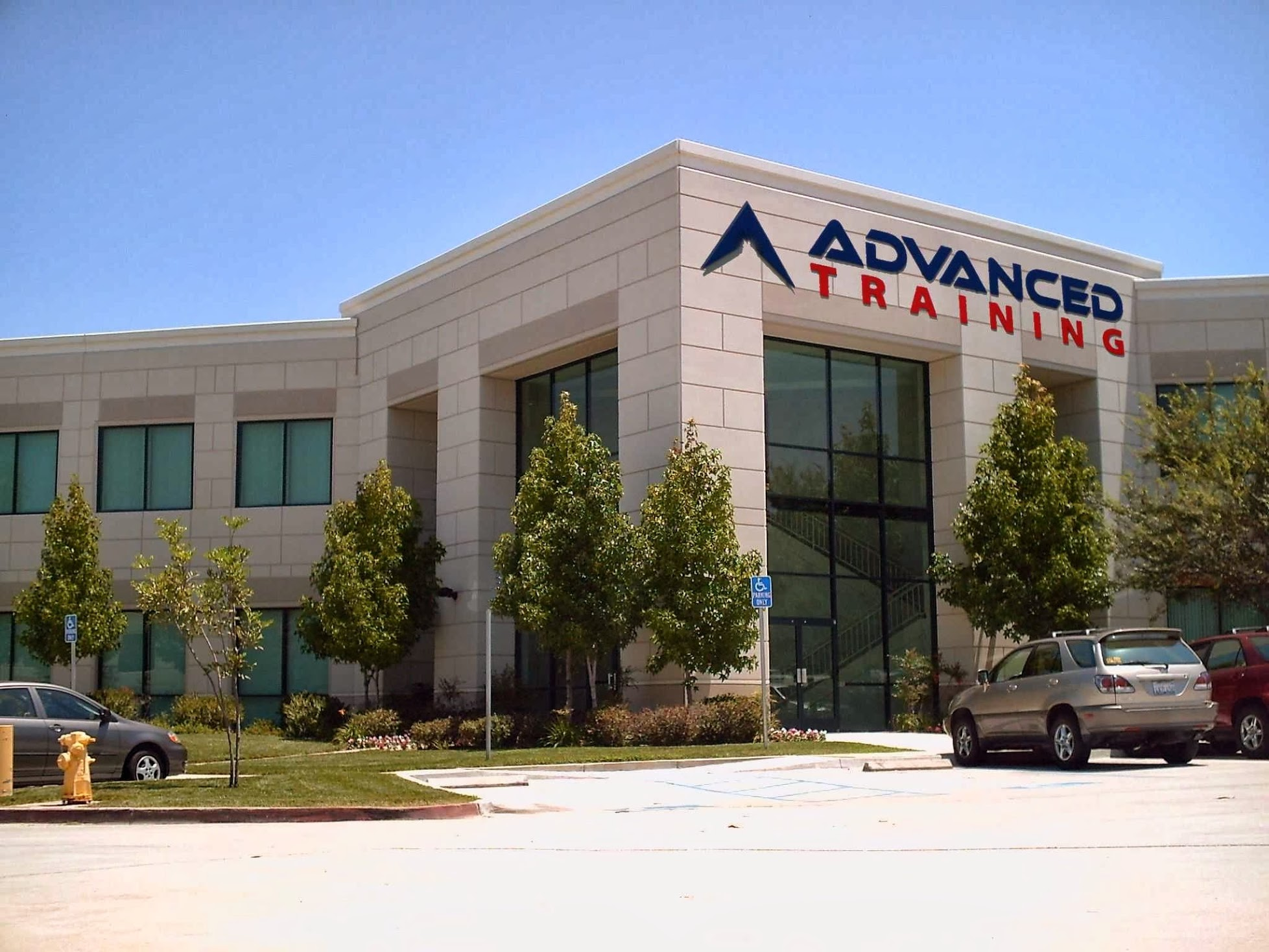
Advanced Training Associates - El Cajon, CA

ATA College, formerly known as Advanced Training Associates, is a private college in El Cajon, California. ATA College is accredited by the Council on Occupational Education (COE) and approved by the Bureau of Private Post-Secondary Education. The institute is also approved to participate in federal financial aid programs by the Department of Education for students who qualify. The school provides training to the military and has been a Department of Defense contractor for vocational education since 1996. Tuition Assistance and Veterans Benefits can be used at ATA College. The institute is an approved training center by the Fiber Optic Association.

ATA College is an official testing site for Pearson VUE and the Electronics Technicians Association. The school is also certified by the National Radio Examiners to administer FCC licensing exams, and the ATA College instructors are official test proctors.
