= Nick Vogel =

American volleyball coach and former player (born 1990)

Personal information
- Full name: Nicholas August Vogel
- Nationality: United States and Germany
- Born: February 5, 1990 (age 36)
- Height: 6 ft 9 in (2.06 m)
- Weight: 220 lb (100 kg)
- Spike: 12 ft 0.5 in (3.67 m)
- Block: 11 ft 10 in (3.61 m)

Coaching information
- Current team: UCLA (Men's team) (Assistant)
Previous teams coached
| Years | Teams |
|---|---|
| 2017–2018; 2016–2017; 2015–2016; 2018–2021 | San Diego Toreros (Volunteer); UC San Diego Tritons (Assistant); UCLA Bruins (Volunteer); DePaul Blue Demons (Assistant) |

Volleyball information
- Position: Middle Blocker/Opposite

Career
| Years | Teams |
|---|---|
| 2012–2013; 2013–2014; 2014–2015 | Panathinaikos Athens; TV Bühl; VfB Friedrichshafen |

National team
| 2009–2015 | United States |
- Last updated: May 2020

Nicholas August Vogel (born February 5, 1990) is an American volleyball coach and former professional volleyball player.

== Early life and education ==
Vogel attended Steele Canyon High School (2004–2007) & Valhalla High School (2007–2008). He graduated UCLA in 2012 with a BA in Anthropology.

== Career ==
=== Playing ===
Vogel played NCAA volleyball for the 19-time National Champion UCLA Bruins from 2009 to 2012 and also played for Team USA in the 2009 FIVB Men's Junior World Championship and the 2011 Pan American Games. After graduating from college in 2012, he played for Panathinaikos Athens for the 2012–2013 professional season. Vogel the played in Germany's Bundesliga for TV Bühl for the 2013–2014 season and then VfB Friedrichshafen for the 2014–2015 season where they competed in the CEV Champions League and were German Cup and Bundesliga Champions.

=== Coaching ===
Vogel retired from playing volleyball in 2015 after being diagnosed with Marfan syndrome. Since then he has worked as a volleyball coach. In 2015, he was a volunteer assistant coach for UCLA Bruins women's volleyball. In August 2016, he became an assistant coach for UC San Diego Tritons men's volleyball. From 2018 to 2021, Vogel was an assistant coach for DePaul Blue Demons women's volleyball. In June 2022, Vogel joined the UCLA Bruins men's volleyball team as an assistant coach.

== Clubs ==
- (Greece) Panathinaikos Athens (2012–2013)
- (Germany) TV Bühl (2013–2014)
- (Germany) VfB Friedrichshafen (2014–2015)
