= Grossmont–Cuyamaca Community College District =

Community college district in California, United States

Coordinates: 32°47′0″N 116°57′52″W

- Type: Public community college district
- Established: 1961
- Chancellor: Lynn C. Neault
- Students: 30,000+
- Campus: Cuyamaca College, 1978 Grossmont College, 1961
- Website: www.gcccd.edu

The Grossmont–Cuyamaca Community College District (GCCCD) is a California community college district comprising two colleges, Grossmont College and Cuyamaca College. The District serves about 28,000 students a year. Grossmont College is located in El Cajon, California, and Cuyamaca College is located in Rancho San Diego, California. The Grossmont–Cuyamaca Community College District primarily serves East San Diego and East County communities.

In 1977 the East County Performing Arts Center was built in partnership by the city of El Cajon, California and the GCCCD. The GCCCD operated the theatre for many years at a financial loss to the school; ultimately turning over the running of the theatre to the city of El Cajon in 1995. The theatre was closed in 2009 but later was renovated and placed under new management when it was reopened as The Magnolia in 2019.

In 1988 GCCCD's board approved the donation of land owned by the college so that the Heritage of the Americas Museum could be built on that property.

In 1990 Richard Sanchez was elected president of Grossmont College. He left the position in 1999 to be replaced with Interim President Dr. Jack Randall, who served in the role until Dr. Ted Martinez took over from 1999 to 2006.
