= Brad Leaf =

American-Israeli basketball player and coach

Brad Leaf ברד ליף
Personal information
- Born: May 17, 1960 (age 66) Indianapolis, Indiana, U.S.
- Listed height: 6 ft 5 in (1.96 m)

Career information
- High school: North Central (Indianapolis, Indiana); Lawrence North (Indianapolis, Indiana)
- College: Evansville (1978–1982)
- NBA draft: 1982: 7th round, 146th overall pick
- Drafted by: Indiana Pacers
- Playing career: 1982–1998
- Position: Shooting guard
- Coaching career: 2001–present

Career history

Playing
- 1982: La Crosse Catbirds
- 1982–1995: Hapoel Galil Elyon
- 1995–1998: Maccabi Tel Aviv

Coaching
- 2001–2005: Steele Canyon HS
- 2005–2021: Foothills Christian HS

Career highlights
- Israeli Premier League MVP (1990); AP Honorable mention All-American (1982); 3× First-team All-MCC (1980–1982); MCC tournament MVP (1982); No. 15 jersey retired by Evansville Purple Aces
- Stats at Basketball Reference

Brad Leaf (Hebrew: ברד ליף; born May 17, 1960) is an American-Israeli basketball coach and former player. He played 17 years of professional basketball in Israel, first for Hapoel Galil Elyon and later for Maccabi Tel Aviv of the Israel Premier League and Euroleague. He won the Israeli Basketball Premier League MVP award in 1989–90. He played college basketball for the Evansville Purple Aces from 1979 to 1982, and was the school's first All-American in NCAA Division I.

== Early and personal life ==
Leaf was born and raised in Indianapolis, Indiana. He and his wife Karen became Israeli citizens. He said: "For about 20 years, I considered [Israel] home. I loved it there. They are great people." He and his wife have a daughter, Talia, and three sons, one of whom is NBA player T. J. Leaf, a former power forward for the Indiana Pacers. His son Troy Leaf was Pacific West Conference 2015 Basketball Player of the Year. The family moved to the San Diego, California, area in 1999.

== High school career ==
A 6' 5" shooting guard, Leaf played high school basketball first at North Central High School. He transferred to Lawrence North High School during his junior year in high school. Leaf led all Marion County, Indiana, scorers as a senior at Lawrence North in 1978 with a 25.5-point average, with a single-game high of 38 points. Ben Davis High School's Randy Wittman was second.

== College career ==
Leaf took a scholarship to the University of Evansville, playing for the Evansville Purple Aces from 1979 to 1982, and a co-captain in his last year. As a sophomore, he averaged 16.2 points per game and set the then-Evansville season free throw percentage record at 81.1 percent. In 1981–82, he scored 17.6 points per game (for the second consecutive year), leading the school to a 19–9 record and its first NCAA Division I tournament. He was the school's first All-American in NCAA Division I, named to the Sporting News Special Mention team in 1980–81 and Honorable Mention team in 1982, and earned three All-America honorable mention awards in 1982. He was also a three-time First Team All-Midwestern City Conference Player (in 1980, 1981, and 1982), and MVP of the 1982 Midwestern City Conference men's basketball tournament. He was 5th in school history in field goals (621), 6th in field goal percentage (52.2%), 7th in points (1,605), and 9th in free throws (363).

== Professional career ==
Leaf was a seventh-round draft pick of the Indiana Pacers in 1982. Leaf briefly played for the La Crosse Catbirds of the Continental Basketball Association before embarking on a professional career in Israel.

Leaf had a 17-season professional career in Israel. He played for 12 years for Hapoel Galil Elyon, alongside such players as Nadav Henefeld, Doron Sheffer, Andrew Kennedy, and Mike Gibson, and later for Maccabi Tel Aviv of the Israel Premier League and Euroleague. He won the Israeli Basketball Premier League MVP award in 1989–90. In both 1989–90 and 1991–92 he was voted a member of the Israeli Basketball Premier League Quintet, an award given to the five best players of each season of the Israeli Basketball Premier League. Leaf said: "I went for a year, and a year, and another year, then got married and had kids. My career was going pretty good. The people were fantastic. They were like family. So I kept staying."

== Coaching career ==
After his playing career, Leaf began his coaching career in 2001–02 at Steele Canyon High School in San Diego, California. He coached them to a 30–2 record in 2004, and CIF San Diego Section boys basketball titles in 2004 and 2005. Beginning in the 2005–06 season, Leaf has coached at Foothills Christian High School in El Cajon, California, leading the team to seven titles through 2020. He had 380 total wins between the two schools through December 2019. In 2016 he was named CIF Coach of the Year. He coached his son T. J. at Foothills Christian in high school, with T.J. as a senior in 2015–16 averaging 28.4 points, 12.4 rebounds, 5.3 assists, and 3.2 steals per game. He also runs a construction company.

== Honors ==
In 1988, Leaf was inducted into the University of Evansville Purple Aces Hall of Fame. The school retired his jersey, # 15, in 2018.

== See also ==
- Israeli Premier League Statistical Leaders
