= Mark Arabo =

Assyrian American businessman

- Born: Mark Paul Arabo; February 17, 1983 (age 43)
- Education: San Diego State University (B.S.)
- Website: markarabo.com

Mark Paul Arabo (born February 17, 1983) is a Chaldean Catholic businessman, San Diego community leader, and global humanitarian. He is a human rights activist for the Iraqi Christian diaspora and speaks to the national US media, advocating greater US engagement since the Islamic State has threatened the Christian community in Iraq. Arabo was chosen by Voice of San Diego as the Voice for Refuge for 2014 for his relentless work pressing the Obama administration to provide humanitarian aid to religious minorities in Iraq. In 2015, Voice of San Diego panelists recognized Arabo as an "emerging leader to watch" in the coming year. Arabo has been featured on all major news stations including CNN, Fox News, MSNBC, and The Wall Street Journal.

In November 2019, Mark Arabo was tapped by Governor Gavin Newsom to fill a vacancy within the California Workforce Development Board (CWDB). As a board member he is responsible for assisting the Governor in performing the duties and responsibilities required by the Federal Workforce Innovation and Opportunity Act of 2014. His appointment brings new business and workforce experience to the CWDB as Arabo has been involved extensively in employee workforce expansion in his hometown of San Diego, California.

Arabo was a member of the National Finance Committee for President Joe Biden. As one of the 800 volunteer fundraisers for President Joe Biden, he has been an early supporter of his campaign since April 2019. In July 2020, Arabo was formally appointed by the Joe Biden campaign as a delegate for the de facto presidential nominee at the 2020 Democratic National Convention. Arabo was tapped to represent the state of California at the national convention. Arabo is serving as an at-large delegate, meaning that the position came as a result of an unelected appointment by the Biden campaign for the entirety of California.

In August 2023, Arabo was appointed to the board of directors for the 22nd District Agricultural Association by Governor Gavin Newsom. The board of directors is most notable for overseeing the Del Mar Fairgrounds and hosts over 330 events including the San Diego County Fair. This is Arabo's second appointment to a state board by after serving the last four years in the California Workforce Development Board.

In March 2024, Arabo was once again appointed by Governor Newsom to a third state board position. The announcement, via press release from the office of Governor Newsom appoints Arabo to the State Racetrack Leasing Commission.The Commission is responsible for operating the Del Mar Racetrack. Arabo stated that his new role, "creates a unique opportunity to implement comprehensive improvements to the 22nd District Agricultural Association’s property."

Arabos serves as a 2024 Delegate at-large for Vice President Kamala Harris at the Democratic National Convention. After her announcement as the Democratic nominee for United States President, Arabo commented saying, "Vice President Harris is the right person at the right time for the right job.”

== Early life and education ==
Arabo was born into an Iraqi Christian family of the Chaldean Catholic Church. The Arabo family immigrated from Iraq to the United States. Their first business venture was a Wrigley's Supermarket in San Diego. This was Mark Arabo's first experience with the retail grocery business. Eventually, the Arabo family managed a chain of supermarkets throughout San Diego. He attended Valhalla High School before graduating from San Diego State University where he earned his Bachelor of Science degree in Integrated Marketing Communications.

== Career ==
After graduating he was offered a position within the Anheuser-Busch sales team in San Diego. During this time, he was trained in viral marketing and promotional events while being involved with the company's marketing department.

=== Neighborhood Market Association ===
NMA is a nonprofit industry organization with 2,300 business members, headquartered in San Diego with multiple offices throughout California. The organization was founded in 1995. It was originally called the Chaldean Grocers Association and was modeled after other ethnically based grocer organizations. In 1996, the organization changed its name to the San Diego Merchants Association in hopes of promoting inclusiveness. In 2001, the organization changed its name again to Independent Grocers and Convenience Stores and began accepting members from outside of California. In 2007, the organization merged with the California Beverage Merchants, creating the Neighborhood Market Association. The NMA actively lobbies for candidates and measures through its NMA Political Action Committee (NMAPAC).

=== Minority Humanitarian Foundation ===
Arabo founded the Minority Humanitarian Foundation in order to streamline efforts to establish a safe passage for those needing to leave the country of Iraq, and provide humanitarian aid to those who wish to stay in the country. Since its founding, the non-profit has made contact with 70,000 Assyrians who fled from Mosul and surrounding cities when ISIS stormed the region in July. Through the Minority Humanitarian Foundation, Mark Arabo has assisted in providing safety to hundreds of individuals in Iraq and Syria. The foundation is credited with saving numerous lives from war-torn areas, and while some within the United States government have criticized the methods utilized by Arabo, the foundation has received overwhelming support. It was announced in September 2015 that the foundation would be expanding its support to displaced youth in Syria. In March 2016, Arabo and members of the Minority Humanitarian Foundation began to engage in high level discussions with State Department officials, including Ambassador-at-Large for International Religious Freedom, Rabbi David Saperstein, regarding the designation of Christians as victims of genocide. Following the talks, on March 17, 2016, Secretary of State John Kerry announced that Christians would be listed as genocide victims at the hands of ISIS. The decision by the State Department was only the second time the United States has condemned an ongoing genocide. In June 2014, Arabo was the first prominent individual to declare that the persecution of Christians by ISIS was one that constituted genocide, making him the first in the United States to make this claim.

== Community activism ==
Arabo is a nationally recognized Global Humanitarian. He has engaged in dialogue with many leaders including Barack Obama regarding the persecution of Iraqi Christians, and Iraqi Prime Minister Nouri al-Maliki concerning security issues within the country. Arabo crafted House Resolution 683 with Congressman Juan Vargas that reaffirms the United States' commitment to minorities within Iraq. Arabo is currently working with lawmakers on House Resolution 5430 which would grant asylum for Iraqi Christians out of the country in the United States. Arabo and a Chaldean Catholic bishop also traveled to New York in order to lobby United Nations representatives to have their countries accept some of the refugees. Arabo is a supporter of Obama's immigration reform which he advocated for through contact with President Obama. Arabo was also the first to call upon the resignation of El Cajon Mayor Mark Lewis in the wake of his racism scandal.

Arabo has taken stands against measures affecting small business members like the proposed plastic grocery bag ban in San Diego, as well as other ordinances. Arabo has been a constant vocal supporter for the rights and protection of small businesses in the face of corporate interest. In his presidency at the Neighborhood Market Association, Arabo has worked on grassroots efforts in stopping corporate and big-box influence from adversely affecting the small business community.

Arabo recently posted a $10,000 bounty on the "North Park Creep" who had sexually assaulted more than 6 women in the North Park area. A week after the bounty was posted, David Angelo Drake was booked Tuesday on six counts of assault with a deadly weapon, six counts of assault with the intent to commit sexual assault, five counts of battery, and two counts of sexual assault with a foreign object.

Mark Arabo is currently working on legislation within California that would mandate cameras for police officers. Arabo hopes to make body cameras mandatory for all police forces within the United States. Arabo has been a leading voice in the fight to keep Father Noel and 14 other priests from deportation to a war-torn Iraq. His efforts in conjunction with St. Peter's led to the Vatican overturning a ruling by the patriarch keeping the priests in San Diego.

As of 2019, Arabo has been a vocal supporter of the Joe Biden presidential campaign, holding numerous fundraising events with the former Vice President of the United States. The Vice President and Arabo have interests aligned in supporting the ethnic Iraqi Christian minority. In February 2019, Arabo wrote an op-ed in the San Diego Union-Tribune about his support for Joe Biden.

In 2020, Mark Arabo was also a member of the National Finance Committee for the Biden for President campaign, having raised over $100,000 for the Joe Biden campaign. He also endorsed Biden in early summer 2019 when he hosted him at his house. Arabo was also among the list of invited attendees for the 2021 inauguration of Joe Biden, although he did not attend in person due to security measures implemented after the U.S. Capitol attack.

In June 2020, Arabo worked to raise money for the family of George Floyd while applauding Governor Gavin Newsom for his work in the passage of police reform bill, AB 392.

In May 2025 Mark Arabo was awarded an honorary doctorate from his alma mater, San Diego State University. As part of the conferral, Arabo gave the commencement address to the 2025 graduating class of the San Diego State University Fowler College of Business.

== Personal life ==
Arabo resides in San Diego with his wife Randa Arabo and their four children. His brother, Auday Arabo, ran for California State Assembly in 2008.
