= Brad Daluiso =

American football player (born 1967)

No. 5, 3
- Position: Placekicker

Personal information
- Born: December 31, 1967 (age 58); San Diego, California, U.S.
- Listed height: 6 ft 1 in (1.85 m)
- Listed weight: 180 lb (82 kg)

Career information
- High school: Valhalla (Rancho San Diego, California)
- College: UCLA
- NFL draft: 1991: undrafted

Career history
- Green Bay Packers (1991)*; Atlanta Falcons (1991); Buffalo Bills (1991); Dallas Cowboys (1992)*; Denver Broncos (1992); New York Giants (1993–2000); Oakland Raiders (2001)
- * Offseason or practice squad member only

Awards and highlights
- Second-team All-Pac 10 (1990)

Career NFL statistics
- Field goals made: 128
- Field goal attempts: 168
- Field goal %: 76.2
- Longest field goal: 54
- Stats at Pro Football Reference

Bradley William Daluiso (born December 31, 1967) is an American former professional football player who was a placekicker in the National Football League (NFL) for the Atlanta Falcons, Buffalo Bills, Denver Broncos, New York Giants and Oakland Raiders. He played college football for the UCLA Bruins.

== Early life ==
Daluiso attended Valhalla High School, where he competed in soccer and tennis. He contributed to the team winning the 1986 CIF 3A soccer championship.

In 1986, he enrolled at San Diego State University but did not play football. In 1987, he transferred to Grossmont College, where his mother was a family life professor. As a freshman, he played only for the soccer team. As a sophomore in 1988, he became a football player for the first time and was used as a kickoff specialist.

As a junior in 1989, he walked on at the University of California, Los Angeles. He handled 46 of the team's 48 kickoffs and had 20 touchbacks (43.5%).

As a senior in 1990, he started and made 13 of 19 field goals and 32 and 33 extra points. He hit a 21-yard field goal with one second remaining, to clinch a 32–31 win against Stanford University. He made a 43-yard field goal with 10 seconds left in the game, to seal a 25–22 win against the No. 2 ranked University of Washington.

== Professional career ==
=== Green Bay Packers ===
Daluiso was signed as an undrafted free agent by the Green Bay Packers after the 1991 NFL draft. He handled all of the kicking during the preseason while placekicker Chris Jacke was involved in a contract holdout. He made 7 of 8 field goals and all 12 of his extra point attempts. On August 26, he was traded to the Atlanta Falcons.

=== Atlanta Falcons ===
In 1991, he appeared in 2 games, making 2 of 3 field goals and 2 extra points. On September 9, he was waived after the team agreed to terms with kicker Norm Johnson.

=== Buffalo Bills ===
On September 11, 1991, he was claimed off waivers by the Buffalo Bills. He appeared in 14 regular season games and 3 playoff games, including Super Bowl XXVI. He was used as a kickoff specialist to complement incumbent Scott Norwood and did not attempt a field goal or extra point. He had 26 touchbacks on 78 kickoffs (33.3%).

=== Dallas Cowboys ===
On February 18, 1992, he was signed as a Plan B free agent by the Dallas Cowboys, to replace Ken Willis. He lost the competition to rookie Lin Elliott. He was released on August 31.

=== Denver Broncos ===
On September 1, 1992, he was claimed off waivers by the Denver Broncos. He appeared in 16 regular season games. He was used as a kickoff specialist to complement incumbent placekicker David Treadwell and only attempted one field goal, which he missed. He was released on August 21, 1993.

=== New York Giants ===
On September 1, 1993, he signed as a free agent with the New York Giants, reuniting with head coach Dan Reeves, who was also his head coach with the Denver Broncos. He appeared in 15 regular season games, again primarily used as a kickoff specialist to complement David Treadwell, his former teammate with the Broncos. He was also used three times to kick longer distance field goals due to his leg strength, converting once; the kick he made proved to be the difference in the Giants' victory over the Phoenix Cardinals late in the season.

After starting the 1994 season as the Giants' kickoff specialist, Daluiso eventually supplanted a struggling Treadwell as the starting kicker in Week 14. He converted all eleven of his field goals and five extra points, with a long of 52 yards, and would keep the starting kicker position going forward.

In 1999, he appeared in 6 games, before being placed on the injured reserve list with an ACL tear in his non-kicking left leg, that he suffered tackling Dallas Cowboys cornerback Kevin Mathis on a kickoff return. He was replaced with Cary Blanchard.

In 2000, he was the team's recipient of the Ed Block Courage Award and played in Super Bowl XXXV. He was not re-signed after the season, leaving as the franchise's all-time most accurate kicker and second-leading scorer.

=== Oakland Raiders ===
On January 5, 2002, he was signed as an injury replacement for Sebastian Janikowski. He appeared in the season finale against the New York Jets, making 3 of 4 field goal attempts and 1 of 2 on extra point attempts in a 24–22 loss. His misses cost the Raiders a first-round bye in 2001. That allowed the Patriots to have home field advantage in the divisional round. They beat the Raidersand started the Patriots dynasty. He was released on January 8, 2002.

== Personal life ==
Daluiso was on the Late Show with David Letterman in 1997 (Episode #5.62). He is a member of the Sigma Chi fraternity.
