= Rancho San Jacinto Sobrante =

Mexican land grant in California

Coordinates: 33.860°N 117.460°W

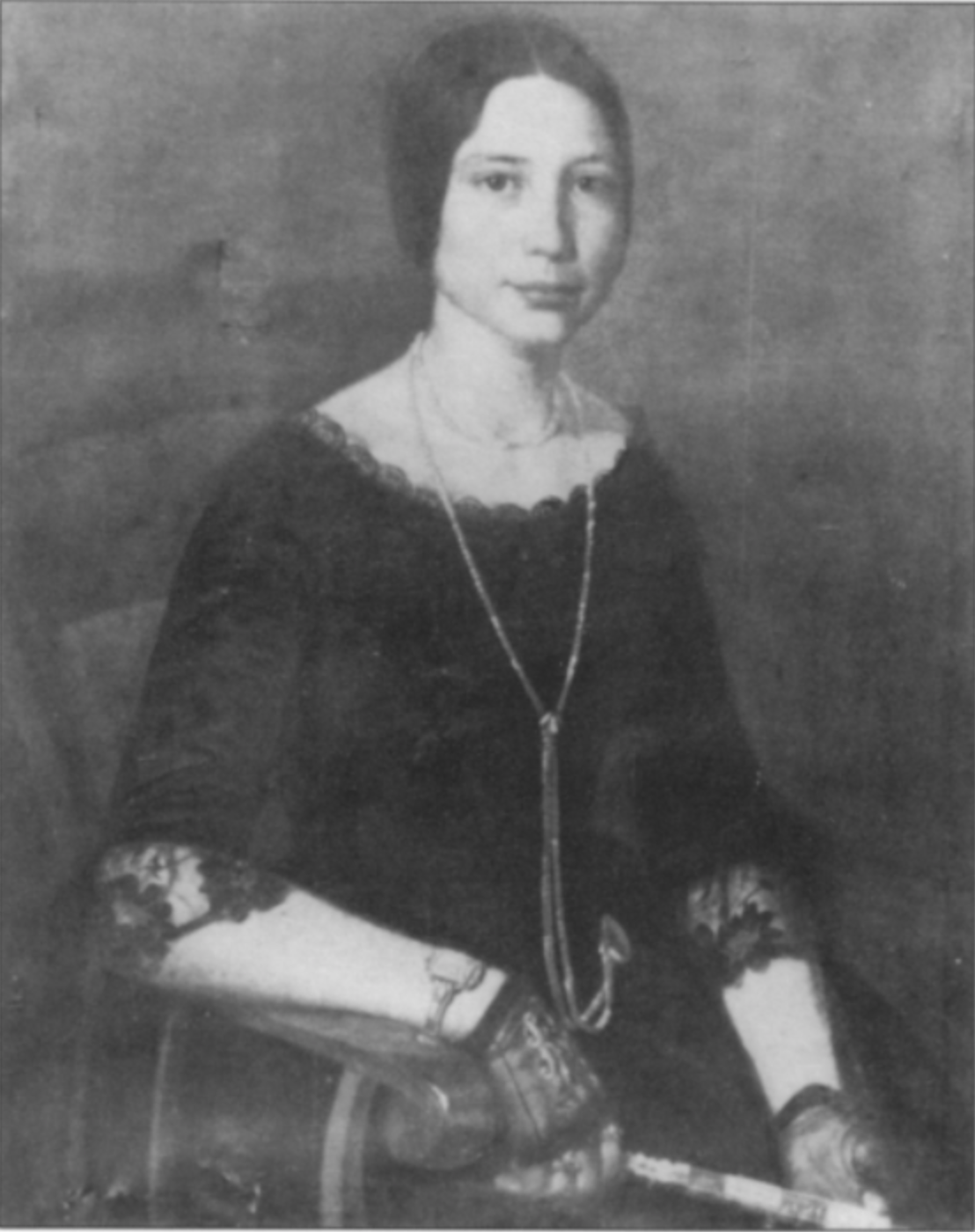
María del Rosario Estudillo de Aguirre, a member of the Estudillo family of California and wife of José Antonio Aguirre, was granted Rancho San Jacinto Sobrante in 1846.

Rancho San Jacinto Sobrante was a 48,847-acre (197.68 km^{2}) Mexican land grant in present-day Riverside County, California given in 1846 by Governor Pío Pico to María del Rosario Estudillo de Aguirre. The Rancho San Jacinto Sobrante grant was of the surplus or "sobrante" of Jose Antonio Estudillo's Rancho San Jacinto Viejo and Miguel Pedrorena's Rancho San Jacinto Nuevo y Potrero. The grant encompassed present day Lake Mathews. At the time of the US patent, Rancho San Jacinto Sobrante was a part of San Bernardino County. The County of Riverside was created by the California Legislature in 1893 by taking land from both San Diego and San Bernardino Counties.

== History ==
María del Rosario Estudillo was the daughter of José Antonio Estudillo, grantee of Rancho San Jacinto Viejo. José Antonio Estudillo was appointed administrator and majordomo at Mission San Luis Rey in 1840. Three grants, comprising over 133,000 acres (538 km^{2}) of the former Mission San Luis Rey lands in the San Jacinto area were made to the Estudillo family: Rancho San Jacinto Viejo to José Antonio Estudillo in 1842; Rancho San Jacinto Nuevo y Potrero to his son-in-law, Miguel Pedrorena, in 1846; and the five square league Rancho San Jacinto Sobrante to his daughter, María del Rosario Estudillo, in 1846.

María del Rosario Estudillo was married to José Antonio Aguirre (1799–1860). Before she died, Aguirre had been married to María del Rosario's sister, Francisca Estudillo, eldest daughter of José Antonio Estudillo. José Antonio Aguirre owned one-half of Rancho El Tejon. In 1853, José Antonio Aguirre bought Rancho San Jacinto Nuevo y Potrero from the estate of Aguirre's brother-in-law Miguel Pedrorena.

With the cession of California to the United States following the Mexican-American War, the 1848 Treaty of Guadalupe Hidalgo provided that the land grants would be honored. As required by the Land Act of 1851, a claim for Rancho San Jacinto Sobrante was filed with the Public Land Commission in 1852. In 1854, the Commission found that María del Rosario Estudillo de Aguirre was entitled to five square leagues of land. The US District Court in 1855, however, held that the claimant was entitled to eleven square leagues, if so much should be found within the sobrante, and to all that was found therein if it were less than that amount. An appeal taken to the US Supreme Court in 1863, affirmed the eleven square leagues, and the grant was patented to María del Rosario Estudillo de Aguirre in 1867.

Soon after the 1855 District Court decision, the grant was purchased by a group mostly connected with the US Land Office - including Lauren Upson, the Surveyor General, Edward Conway, the chief clerk in his office, and Thompson, the deputy who was directed to make the survey, and Joseph S. Wilson, the Commissioner of the United States General Land Office at Washington. It was alleged that the location of the grant was moved to make it contain valuable tin ores not within its limits if fairly surveyed. In 1888, the United States unsuccessfully sought to have the US Supreme Court declare the patent void based upon the grounds of a fraudulent survey by persons who the beneficiaries thereof.

== See also ==
- Rancho San Jacinto Nuevo y Potrero
- Rancho San Jacinto Viejo
- Rancho San Jacinto y San Gorgonio
- Ranchos of California
- List of Ranchos of California
