= Cajon Valley Union School District =

School district in California, United States

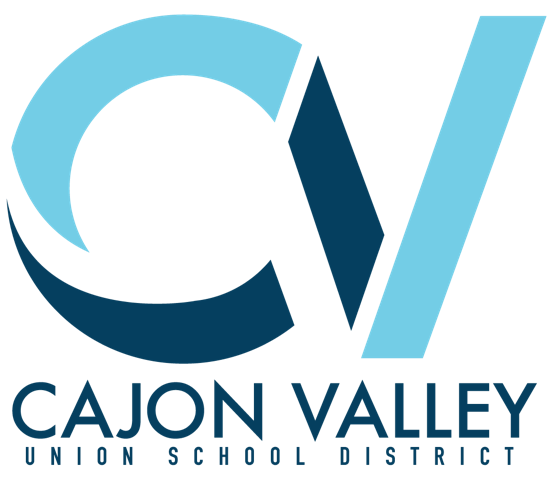

Location
- 750 East Main Street, El Cajon, California United States

District information
- Grades: K–12
- Established: 1870
- Superintendent: Dave Miyashiro
- School board: As of 2025: Karen Clark-Mejia, President (Area 4); "Lily" Emily Schworm, Vice-President (Area 3); Jolyana Jirjees, Board Clerk (Area 2); James P. Miller, Jr., Member (Area 5); Anthony Carnevale, Member (Area 1)
- Schools: 29

Other information
- Website: www.cajonvalley.net

Cajon Valley Union School District (CVUSD) is a school district based in El Cajon, California.

The district has 66.3 square miles (172 km^{2}) of area and serves most of El Cajon. It also serves Rancho San Diego. The district has about 16,000 students in grades Kindergarten through 8.

It was established on October 4, 1870, as El Cajon School District.

== Schools ==
Middle schools

- Cajon Valley Middle School
- Greenfield Middle School
- Hillsdale Middle School
- Los Coches Creek Middle School
- Montgomery Middle School
- Emerald Middle School

Elementary schools

- Anza Elementary School
- Avocado Elementary School
- Blossom Valley Elementary School
- Bostonia Language Academy
- Chase Elementary School
- Crest Elementary School
- Emerald STEAM Magnet Middle School
- Fuerte Elementary School
- W. D. Hall Elementary School
- Jamacha Elementary School
- Johnson Elementary School
- Lexington Elementary School
- Madison Elementary School
- Magnolia Elementary School
- Meridian Elementary School
- Naranca Elementary School
- Rancho San Diego Elementary School
- Rios Computer Science Magnet Elementary School
- Vista Grande Elementary School

=== Other schools ===
- Empower Academy
- Cajon Valley Home School
- Sevick School
- Flying Hills School of the Arts
- Eje Academies Charter School
