= Foothills Christian Schools =

Location
- Preschool: 315 W Bradley Ave, El Cajon, CA 92020; Elementary: 10404 Lake Jennings Park Road, Lakeside, CA 92040; Middle: 350 Cypress Lane Suite C, El Cajon, CA 92020; High: 2321 Dryden Road, El Cajon, CA 92020; United States

Information
- Religious affiliation: Christianity
- Website: foothillsschool.net

Campuses in the San Diego area

Foothills Christian Schools (FCS) is a private Christian school network in San Diego County, California, covering grades preschool-12.

== Schools ==
Schools in the network:

- Foothills Christian Preschool - El Cajon
- Foothills Christian School (K-5) - Lakeside
- Foothills Christian Middle School - El Cajon
- Foothills Christian High School - El Cajon

== Athletics ==
Basketball coach Brad Leaf has coached the Foothills Christian High School boys basketball team to seven titles through 2020. In 2016 he was named California Interscholastic Federation Coach of the Year.

In basketball, T. J. Leaf attended the school, and played basketball under his father. As a junior, Leaf led Foothills Christian to the San Diego Section Division II championship. Cal-Hi Sports named him their Division II State Player of the Year. In his senior year, Leaf led the team to a No. 3 state ranking. Leaf finished his high school career second all-time in the San Diego Section in both points (3,022) and rebounds (1,476).

== Notable alumni ==
- Jaylen Hands, NBA G League basketball player
- T. J. Leaf, Israeli-American NBA basketball player for the Indiana Pacers

== Notable faculty ==
- Brad Leaf, American-Israeli basketball player for Hapoel Galil Elyon and Maccabi Tel Aviv of the Israel Premier League, former coach of boys basketball
