= Alex Vesia =

American baseball player (born 1996)

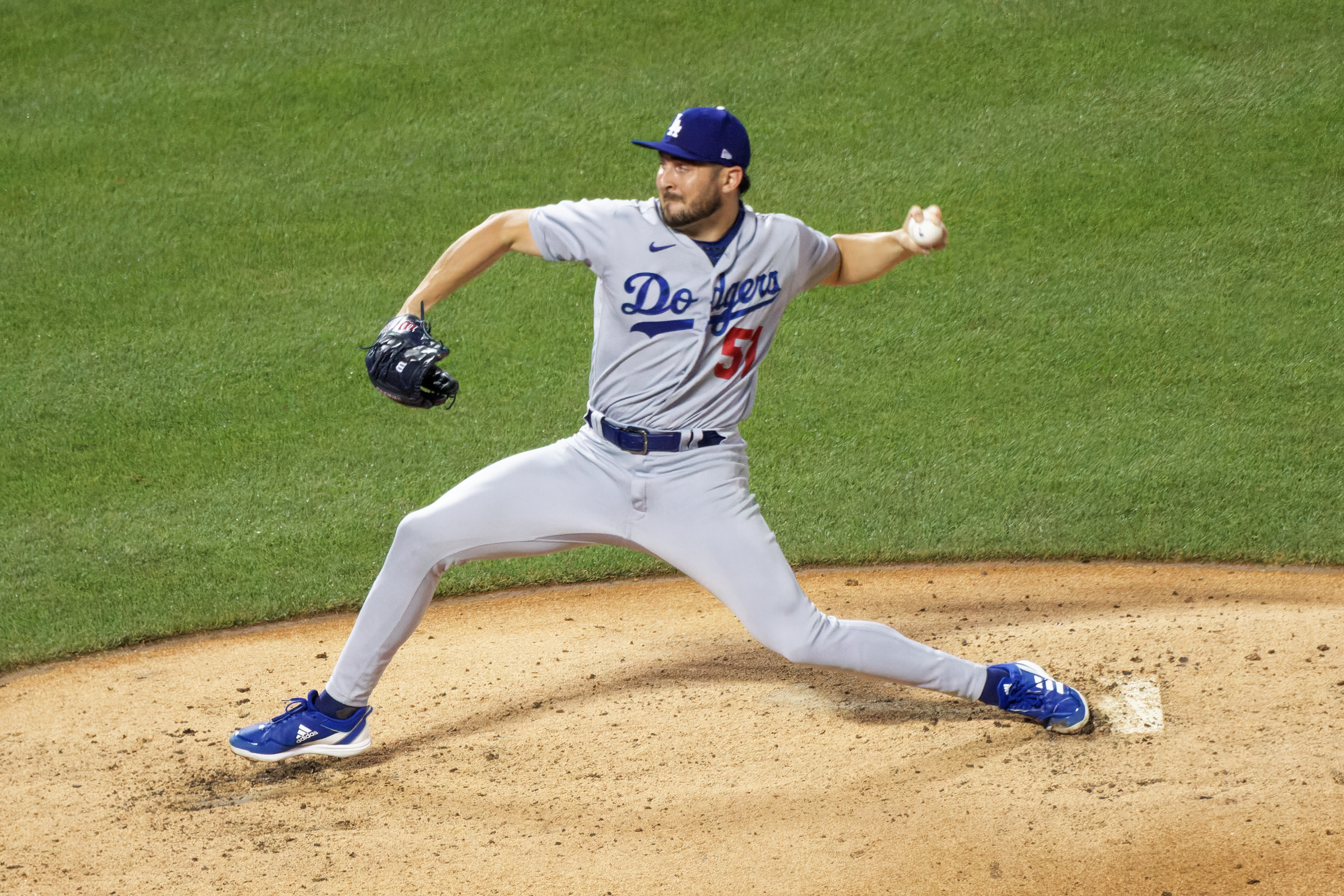
- Vesia with the Dodgers in 2023

Free agent
- Pitcher
- Born: April 11, 1996 (age 30); Alpine, California, U.S.
- Bats: Left Throws: Left

MLB debut
- July 25, 2020, for the Miami Marlins

MLB statistics (through 2026 season)
- Win–loss record: 22–14
- Earned run average: 2.87
- Strikeouts: 443
- Stats at Baseball Reference

Teams
- Miami Marlins (2020); Los Angeles Dodgers (2021–2026)

Career highlights and awards
- 2× World Series champion (2024, 2025 (Note: Vesia was not on the 2025 World Series roster due to a family emergency but participated in all other postseason rounds.))

Alexander Victor Vesia (born April 11, 1996) is an American professional baseball pitcher who is a free agent. He previously played in Major League Baseball (MLB) for the Miami Marlins and Los Angeles Dodgers.

== Early life ==
Vesia was born in Alpine, California, to Bob and Cindy. He attended Steele Canyon High School in Spring Valley, California, where he played baseball. In 2014, his senior year, he earned All-East County honors. Undrafted in the 2014 Major League Baseball draft, he enrolled at California State University, East Bay, where he played college baseball.

== College career ==
In 2015, Vesia's freshman season at Cal State East Bay, he started 12 games in which he went 5–4 with a 2.18 ERA over 74 1/3 innings, earning California Collegiate Athletic Association Freshman of the Year honors. As a sophomore in 2016, he made 15 starts, going 7–5 with a 3.30 ERA, striking out 64 batters in 95 1/3 innings, earning All-CCAA Second Team honors. That summer, he played in the Northwoods League for the Mankato MoonDogs. In 2017, Vesia's junior year, he appeared in 14 games (nine starts), pitching to a 4–6 record with a 4.82 ERA. Following the season, he played in the Alaska Baseball League for the Alaska Goldpanners of Fairbanks. As a senior at Cal State East Bay in 2018, he pitched in 14 games (making seven starts) while going 8–2 with a 1.94 ERA and was named to the All-CCAA First Team. After his senior season, he was selected by the Miami Marlins in the 17th round of the 2018 Major League Baseball draft.

== Professional career ==
=== Miami Marlins ===
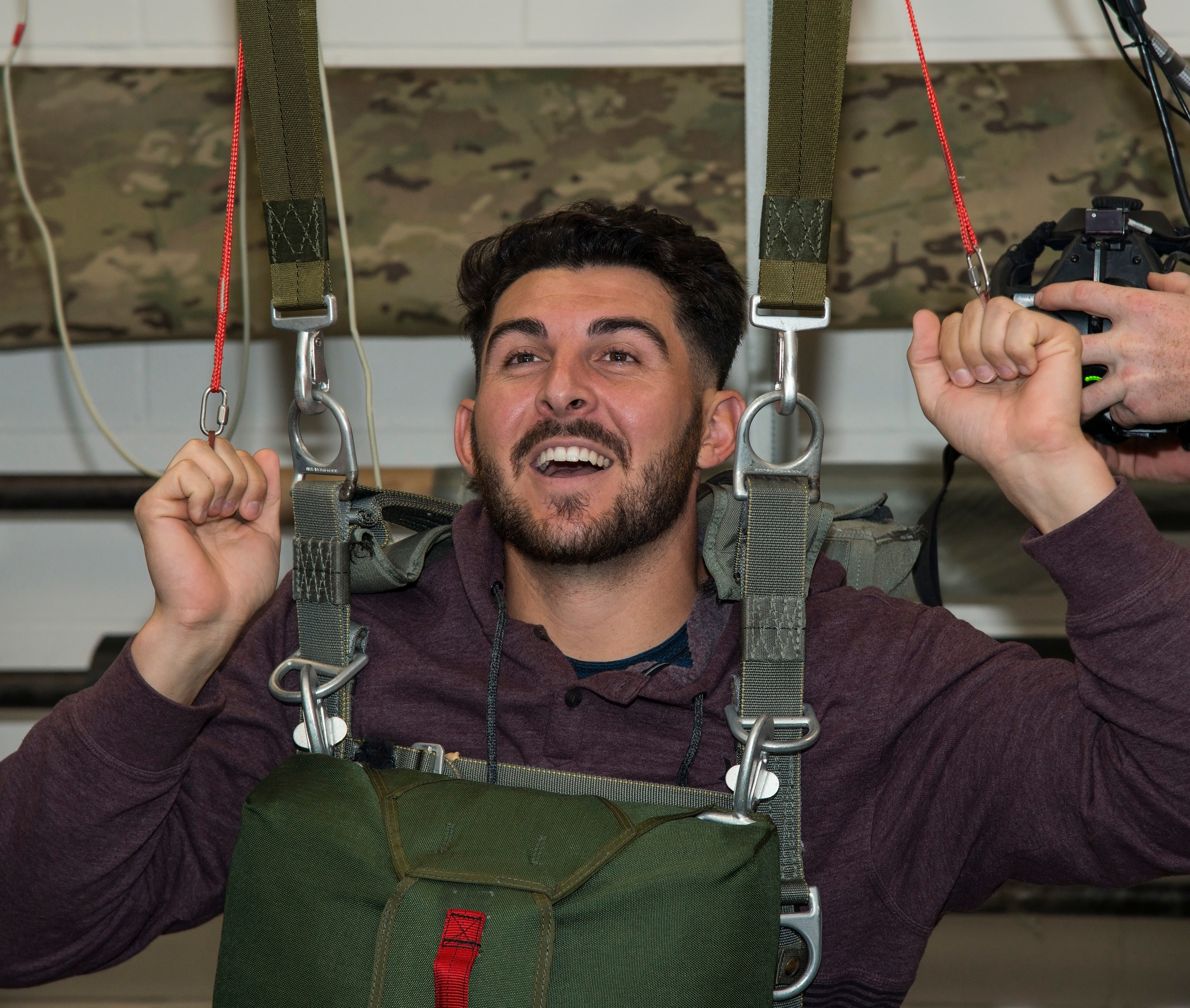
Vesia in 2020

Vesia signed with Miami, making his professional debut with the Gulf Coast League Marlins before earning a promotion to the Batavia Muckdogs. Over 33 1/3 relief innings pitched with the two clubs, he went 4–0 with a 1.35 ERA and 38 strikeouts. In 2019, Vesia began the year with the Clinton LumberKings before earning a promotion to the Jupiter Hammerheads in June and the Jacksonville Jumbo Shrimp in August. Over 66 2/3 relief innings pitched between the three clubs, he went 7–2 with a 1.76 ERA and 100 strikeouts. He was selected to play in the Arizona Fall League for the Salt River Rafters following the season and was named a Fall League All-Star.

On July 22, 2020, it was announced that Vesia had made Miami's 2020 Opening Day roster. He made his MLB debut on July 25 against the Philadelphia Phillies. He was placed on the 10-day injured list on August 2 and missed the rest of the season. He pitched a total of 4 1/3 innings for the Marlins in 2020 in which he gave up nine earned runs and seven walks while striking out five.

=== Los Angeles Dodgers ===
On February 12, 2021, the Marlins traded Vesia and Kyle Hurt to the Los Angeles Dodgers in exchange for Dylan Floro.

On July 31, 2021, Vesia recorded his first career MLB win against the Arizona Diamondbacks. On September 21, 2021, Vesia recorded his first MLB save against the Colorado Rockies. He spent a majority of the 2021 season in the major leagues with the Dodgers, with whom he pitched a total of forty innings over 41 games with a 3-1 record, a 3.86 ERA, and 54 strikeouts during the season. Vesia pitched in two games of the 2021 NLDS and five of the six games of the 2021 NLCS, allowing only one run on five hits and three walks while striking out seven in 4 1/3 innings. He pitched a total of nine innings with the Oklahoma City Dodgers when not with Los Angeles.

In 2022, Vesia pitched in 63 games, for a 5–0 record and 2.15 ERA during the season and pitched 2 2/3 scoreless innings in the postseason. He followed that up in 2023, with a 2–5 record and 4.35 ERA in 56 games and allowed one home run in two innings in the NLDS. After the season, he agreed to a $1 million contract for 2024 in salary arbitration. In 2024, he was 5–4 with a 1.76 ERA in 66 1/3 innings over 67 games. In the 2024 NLDS, Vesia allowed only one hit in three innings, while striking out four batters, however, he injured an intercostal muscle in the series and was left off the roster for the NLCS. He rejoined the roster for the 2024 World Series, and allowed only one hit and one walk while striking out two in 2 2/3 scoreless innings.

In 2025, Vesia pitched in 59 2/3 innings over 68 games with a 4–2 record, 3.02 ERA and five saves. In the postseason, Vesia pitched in seven games, working 4 2/3 innings over the first three rounds. He allowed two runs on one hit and three walks while striking out four batters. However, he was not on the roster for the 2025 World Series due to the unexpected death of his infant daughter. On April 14, 2026, during Healthcare Appreciation Night at Dodger Stadium, Vesia struck out the side in the top of the ninth on just 10 pitches against the New York Mets, with the medical team who cared for his wife and daughter in attendance.

Vesia remained a key part of the Dodgers bullpen during the 2026 campaign, pitching 58 innings over 72 games with a 2.64 ERA.

== Personal life ==
Vesia and his wife Kayla had an infant daughter, Sterling, who died on October 26, 2025. Prior to the 2025 World Series, the Dodgers announced that Vesia would not be playing as a result of a “deeply personal family matter.”
