= Rancho El Cajon =

Mexican land grant in California

Rancho El Cajón
- Historic Ranch Land
- Interactive map of Rancho El Cajón
- Coordinates: 32.830°N 116.950°W
- Established: 1845
- Founder: María Antonia Estudillo de Pedrorena

Area
  - Total: 197.5 km^{2} (76.3 sq mi)

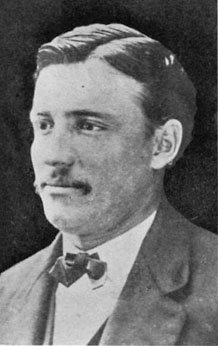
Don Miguel de Pedrorena, a noted Californio ranchero and merchant whose family owned Rancho El Cajón.

Rancho El Cajón was a 48,800-acre (197 km^{2}) Mexican land grant in present day San Diego County, California, given in 1845 by Governor Pio Pico to María Antonia Estudillo de Pedrorena. The name means "the drawer" in Spanish, and refers to the valley between hills. The grant encompassed present day El Cajon, Bostonia, Santee, Lakeside, Flinn Springs, and the eastern part of La Mesa. The grant contained the 28-acre (0.11 km^{2}) Rancho Cañada de los Coches grant.

== History ==
Previously lands of the San Diego Mission, the eleven square league grant was received in 1845 by María Antonia Estudillo, wife of Miguel Pedrorena. The grant was originally called Rancho Santa Monica, and later renamed Rancho El Cajon. Miguel Pedrorena (1808–1850), a native of Madrid, Spain, who came to California from Peru in 1838, operated a trading business. He married María Antonia Estudillo, daughter of José Antonio Estudillo, alcalde of San Diego.

With the cession of California to the United States following the Mexican–American War, the 1848 Treaty of Guadalupe Hidalgo provided that the land grants would be honored. As required by the Land Act of 1851, a claim for Rancho El Cajon was filed by Thomas W. Sutherland, guardian of Pedrorena's heirs (his son, Miguel, and his three daughters, Victoria, Ysabel and Elenain) with the Public Land Commission in 1852, confirmed by the U.S. Supreme Court, and the grant was patented in 1876.

In 1868, Los Angeles land developer Isaac Lankershim bought the bulk of the Pedrorena's Rancho El Cajon holdings, employing Major Levi Chase, a former Union Army officer, as his agent. Chase received from Lankershim 7,624 acres (30.9 km^{2}) known as the Chase Ranch. Lankershim hired Amaziah L. Knox, a New Englander whom he had met in San Francisco, to manage Rancho El Cajon. Lankershim subdivided Rancho El Cajon.

== See also ==
- Ranchos of California
- List of Ranchos of California
