= The Fiber Optic Association =

International professional society

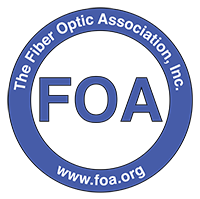
The Fiber Optic Association (FOA) Logo

The Fiber Optic Association (FOA) is an international professional society of fiber optics. The FOA was founded in 1995 by a group of trainers from industry, government and education who wanted to create industry standards for training and certifying fiber optic technicians. The FOA is a not-for-profit 501(c)6 organization based in California, USA, that has over 200 affiliated training organizations in over 40 countries. FOA approves fiber optic training organizations and certifies their instructors who train designers, installers and operators of all types of fiber optic networks. FOA programs are used by many organizations, companies and trade unions to train and certify their workers.

== History ==
At the 1994 Fiber U Conference in Boston, the fiber optic instructors decided that it was time to create a professional society for fiber optics. The fiber optic instructors represented a number of fiber optic manufacturers including 3M, Siecor/Corning, Panduit and Fotec, two universities which had started fiber optic courses (Wentworth and Lincoln Trail College), two US military services and several independent trainers and consultants.

The FOA was incorporated in July 1995 as a non-profit education organization (501(C)6). The founders and some other recruits began meeting to create a certification program. Since the focus of the FOA was technicians not engineers or scientists and there were no good textbooks at the proper level, the first project was to develop a textbook that incorporated the FOA’s desired technical curriculum. That textbook, The Fiber Optic Technicians Manual, was published in 1997. The FOA advisory group developed the Knowledge Skills and Abilities (KSAs) for the basic certification and tests which covered the knowledge part of the KSAs. By late 1997, the first FOA certifications were granted.

FOA was founded to be a professional society to set standards for training, not to do training itself. Next the FOA set standards to approve schools and certify instructors. Schools already teaching fiber optics around the world were invited to join. Since then over 300 schools have participated in the FOA program and certified over 100,000 techs in more than 40 countries.

In 2009, FOA expanded its technical website which now encompasses almost 1,000 pages of technical information and added free online training at its Fiber U website. At the same time, FOA began to self-publish its reference textbooks to provide faster updates and lower costs than were possible with a commercial publisher.

In 2012, FOA recognized the dedication and inspiration of its dedicated core of instructors, many of whom had been founders of the FOA and helped its development by awarding them the designation of "Master Instructor". These 27 Master Instructors had more than 500 years of experience in fiber optics and several had been teaching for more than 30 years.

== Certifications ==
FOA offers certifications for basic fiber optics and premises cabling, installation skills, and specific applications. All certifications are based on the Knowledge, Skills, and Abilities (KSAs) important to the topics. FOA certifications and KSAs are developed by a worldwide panel of experienced trainers and technicians. All FOA certifications follow ANSI/ISO/IEC STANDARD 17024. FOA certifications are recognized by the US Department of Labor.

=== Basic ===
- CFOT - Certified Fiber Optic Technician: covers basic fiber optics for all applications
- CPCT - Certified Premises Cabling Technician: covers fiber, copper and wireless for premises installation

=== Skills ===
- CFOS/S - Certified Fiber Optic Specialist in Splicing
- CFOS/C - Certified Fiber Optic Specialist in Connectors
- CFOS/T - Certified Fiber Optic Specialist in Testing
- CFOS/O - Certified Fiber Optic Specialist in Outside Plant Installation
- CFOS/D - Certified Fiber Optic Specialist in Fiber Optic Network Design

=== Application ===
- CFOS/DC - Certified Fiber Optic Specialist in Data Centers
- CFOS/H - Certified Fiber Optic Specialist in Fiber To The Home
- CFOS/L - Certified Fiber Optic Specialist in Optical LANs
- CFOS/W - Certified Fiber Optic Specialist in Wireless (includes CFOS/A and CFOS/DAS)

== Training ==
The Fiber Optic Association offers certification of skills and knowledge in various fiber optic related areas and specialties. FOA does not offer training courses directly. Training courses for FOA certification is only offered by FOA-Approved schools, educational institutions, private training programs, and community development training centers. All schools teaching FOA certifications have been approved through the FOA's School Approval Program. Each instructor teaching FOA certifications has been certified through the FOA's Train-The-Trainer Program.

== Membership ==
Members of the FOA have demonstrated their knowledge, skills and abilities (KSAs) in training courses and have successfully passed the FOA certification exam. Experienced industry professionals have applied to FOA directly through the FOA’s “Work To Cert” Program for certification based upon their knowledge and skills developed working the field. FOA Corporate Members are organizations and companies involved in the fiber optic industry such as manufacturers, contractors, installers, consultants, etc.

== Resources ==
The FOA publishes textbooks on fiber optics, premises cabling, outside plant and outside plant construction, and network design. FOA maintains a large online library of technical information and has created over 100 online videos, and free online self-study programs.
