= José Antonio Aguirre (early Californian) =

American entrepreneur (1799–1860)

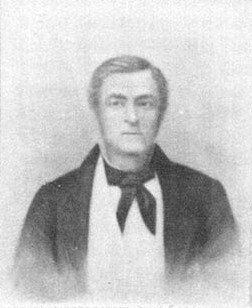
- Born: 1799; San Sebastián, Spain
- Died: July 31, 1860 (aged 60–61); San Diego, California
- Occupations: merchant and rancher

José Antonio Aguirre (1799–1860), commonly known as Don Antonio Aguirre, was a Spanish-born Californio merchant and ranchero, active in the Southern Californian cities of San Diego and Santa Barbara.

== Biography ==
Aguirre was born in San Sebastián, Spain, but left the Basque Country for North America at the age of 15, settling in New Orleans, Louisiana. He became a citizen of first Mexico and then the United States as national powers rose and fell on the continent. He was a merchant in Guaymas, Mexico, then moved to Alta California, becoming a shipowner and trader. He divided his residence between San Diego and Santa Barbara, where he was said in 1842 to own the finest residence in town. He established a warehouse at La Playa, the beach near San Diego where ships would anchor for trading. He exported hides and tallow from San Diego, while importing luxury goods for the Californios such as silks, satins and embroidered shawls. In the late 1830s he became a partner in his trading activities with another Spaniard, Miguel Pedrorena, who later became his brother-in-law. He soon became one of the most prosperous merchants in Alta California.

He became friends with the established Californio families, and in 1841 he married María Francisca Estudillo, eldest daughter of José Antonio Estudillo, a prominent landowner. He and Francisca settled into the grand home he had built in Santa Barbara, but Francisca died within the year, in October 1842, during what would have been the birth of their first child. Aguirre was never to live there again, although he maintained ownership of the house. He took to trading up and down the coast and spent more and more of his time in San Diego.

Aguirre received half of the Rancho El Tejon Mexican land grant in 1843. In 1846 he married Francisca's sister, María del Rosario Estudillo, and they settled in San Diego. They were generally referred to as Don Antonio and Doña Rosario. Their San Diego home was completed in 1851. His wife was the grantee of Rancho San Jacinto Sobrante. Aguirre also owned portions of Santa Cruz Island and Rancho San Pedro, making him one of the largest landowners in Alta California in the late 1840s. In 1853, José Antonio Aguirre bought Rancho San Jacinto Nuevo y Potrero from the estate of Miguel Pedrorena.

In 1850, Aguirre joined William Heath Davis and Miguel Pedrorena (who was married to another Estudillo sister, Antonia) in an attempt to establish a new town, south of the existing town of San Diego and closer to San Diego Bay.

In 1858, Aguirre bought the land and paid for the construction of an adobe church in San Diego. At the time there were only private chapels (in Casa de Estudillo and Casa de Aguirre) since the Presidio church and the Mission church were both in ruins.

José Antonio Aguirre died July 31, 1860. He was buried in the confessional of the church he had donated to the town.

== Personal life ==
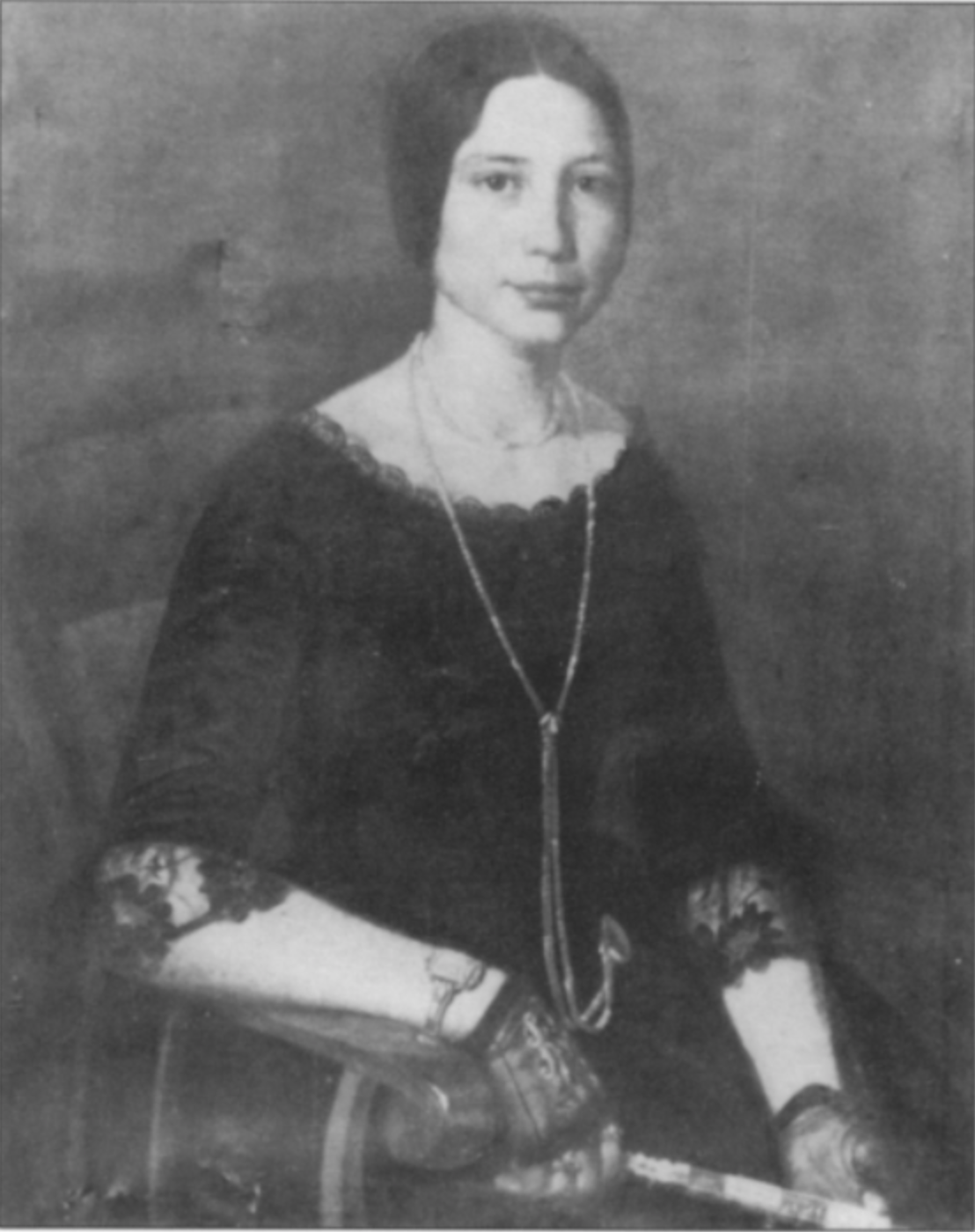
María del Rosario Estudillo de Aguirre, of the Estudillo family of California, married José Antonio Aguirre after the death of her sister María Francisca Estudillo, his first wife.

In 1841, José Antonio Aguirre married María Francisca Estudillo, eldest daughter of prominent landowner José Antonio Estudillo, of the Estudillo family of California. He and María del Rosario Aguirre had four surviving children: Miguel (born August 25, 1849); María de los Dolores del Rosario (born August 6, 1851, later married to Francisco Pico); José Antonio (born August 1, 1853, died February 3, 1855); another son also named José Antonio (born 1856); and Martin Geronimo (born September 21, 1858). On the day of José Sr.'s death, July 31, 1860, another daughter named Maria Antonia was born, but she died in November 1861.

== Legacy ==
His San Diego home, Casa de Aguirre, still stands in Old Town San Diego State Historic Park. It has been restored and contains museum displays and a gift shop. The church he built, known as the Old Adobe Chapel, was bulldozed in the 1930s due to street realignment, but was rebuilt in 1937. It contains many artifacts from the original chapel including Aguirre's tombstone.
