= Rancho San Jacinto Viejo =

Mexican land grant in California

Coordinates: 33.750°N 116.950°W

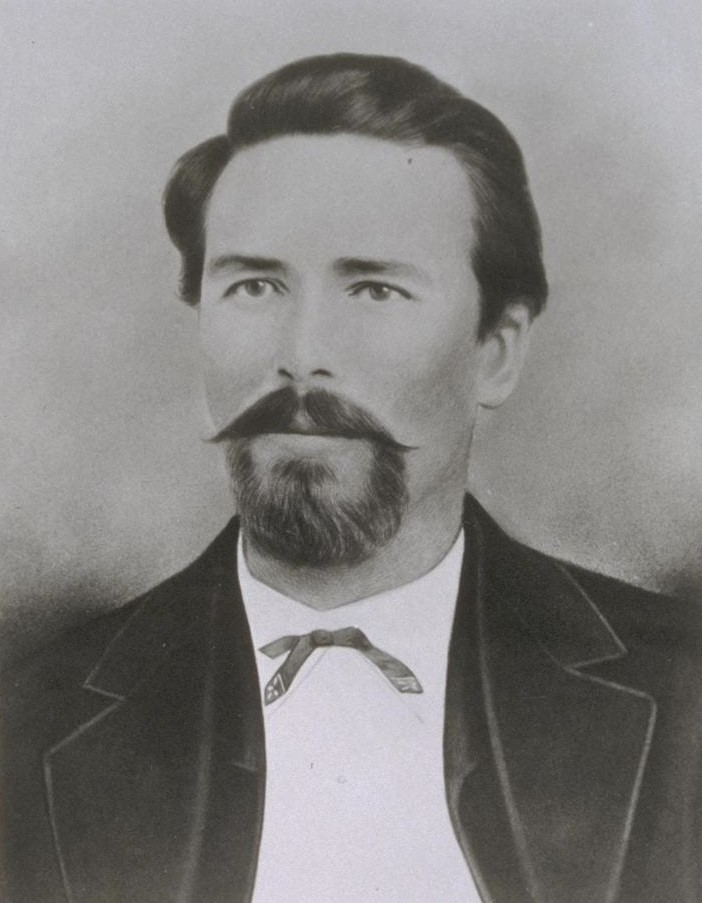
Californio politician José Antonio Estudillo, of the prominent Estudillo family of California, was granted Rancho San Jacinto Viejo in 1842.

Rancho San Jacinto Viejo was a 35,503-acre (143.68 km^{2}) Mexican land grant in present-day Riverside County, California, given in 1842 by Governor Pro-tem Manuel Jimeno to José Antonio Estudillo. At the time of the US Patent, Rancho San Jacinto Viejo was a part of San Diego County. The County of Riverside was created by the California Legislature in 1893 by taking land from both San Bernardino and San Diego Counties. The grant encompassed present-day Hemet and San Jacinto.

== History ==
José María Estudillo was the captain of the Presidio of San Diego. His eldest son, José Joaquín Estudillo (1800 – 1852) was the grantee of Rancho San Leandro. José Antonio Estudillo (1805 – 1852) was his second son. In 1824, José Antonio Estudillo, a lieutenant in the Mexican army, married María Victoria Dominguez. María Victoria's father, Juan José Dominguez, was the grantee of Rancho San Pedro. José Antonio Estudillo was appointed administrator and major domo at Mission San Luis Rey in 1840. Three grants, comprising over 133,000 acres (538 km^{2}) of the former Mission San Luis Rey lands in the San Jacinto area were made to the Estudillo family: the four square league Rancho San Jacinto Viejo to José Antonio Estudillo in 1842; Rancho San Jacinto Nuevo y Potrero to his son-in-law, Miguel Pedrorena, in 1846; and Rancho San Jacinto Sobrante to his daughter, María del Rosario Estudillo, in 1846.

With the cession of California to the United States following the Mexican-American War, the 1848 Treaty of Guadalupe Hidalgo provided that the land grants would be honored. As required by the Land Act of 1851, a claim for Rancho San Jacinto Viejo was filed with the Public Land Commission in 1852, and the grant was patented to the heirs of José Antonio Estudillo in 1880. The lands were broken up in 1889.

== See also ==
- Rancho San Jacinto Nuevo y Potrero
- Rancho San Jacinto Sobrante
- Rancho San Jacinto y San Gorgonio
- Ranchos of California
- List of Ranchos of California
