= Knowledge, Skills, and Abilities =

Federal hiring framework

The Knowledge, Skills, and Abilities (KSA) framework, is a series of narrative statements that, along with résumés, determines who the best applicants are when several candidates qualify for a job. The knowledge, skills, and abilities (KSAs) necessary for the successful performance of a position are contained on each job vacancy announcement. They are:

- Knowledge – the subjects, topics, and items of information that an employee should know at the time he or she is hired or moved into the job.
- Skills – technical or manual proficiencies which are usually learned or acquired through training.
- Abilities – the present demonstrable capacity to apply several knowledge and skills simultaneously in order to complete a task or perform an observable behaviour.

A similar model, the KASE (Knowledge, Attributes, Skills and Experience) framework is used by the careers advisory service at King's College London.

== Evaluation of essays ==
Other names that various agencies use for KSA statements include "Evaluation Factors", "Rating Factors", "Quality Ranking Factors", "Knowledge, Abilities, Skills, and Other Characteristics", and "Job Elements". The exact name used sometimes suggests the content and length of the essay. The required length of the KSA statements varies from employer to employer, but the usual expected length of the KSA factors is typically a page or two.

The scoring of KSA essays is often based on a ranking given to each individual essay, and sometimes with a cutoff score. High scores are derived through answering the KSA question as specifically as possible, providing examples from previous employment or training that clearly demonstrate that the applicant meet the qualifications.

== Controversies ==
In 2009, the US Office of Personnel Management asked federal agencies to stop requiring job applicants to fill out the questionnaires. They were subsequently phased out within a year of the announcement.
