= Rancho San Jacinto y San Gorgonio =

Mexican land grant in California

Coordinates: 33.980°N 117.050°W

Rancho San Jacinto y San Gorgonio (also called Rancho San Timoteo and Rancho Yucaipa) was a 4,440-acre (18.0 km^{2}) Mexican land grant in present-day Riverside County, California given in 1843 by Governor Manuel Micheltorena to James (Santiago) Johnson. At the time of the US Patent, Rancho San Jacinto y San Gorgonio was a part of San Bernardino County. The County of Riverside was created by the California Legislature in 1893 by taking land from both San Bernardino and San Diego Counties. The grant encompassed San Timoteo Canyon.

== History ==
James (Santiago) Johnson (1798–1847) was an Englishman who established the trading firm of Johnson and Aguirre, in Guaymas, Mexico. He came to California in 1833 with his nephew John Forster. Johnson married Maria del Carmen Guirado. Johnson received the one square league Rancho San Jacinto y San Gorgonio grant in 1843. In 1845 Johnson sold this property to Louis Robidoux (?–1868).

With the cession of California to the United States following the Mexican-American War, the 1848 Treaty of Guadalupe Hidalgo provided that the land grants would be honored. As required by the Land Act of 1851, a claim for Rancho San Jacinto y San Gorgonio was filed with the Public Land Commission in 1852, and the grant was patented to Louis Rubidoux in 1872.

In 1868, Rubidoux widow, Guadalupe Garcia de Rubidoux, sold the entire rancho to English immigrant James Singleton (?–1881). James Singleton, his wife, Ann, and their two children, William and Ann, moved onto the Rancho.

In 1869, Singleton sold the southern half of the rancho to Newton Noble. In 1877, Noble lost his ranch to creditors, and it was bought at auction by Frank and Sarah Clough. James Singleton appropriated all of the water in San Timoteo Creek, an act that initiated an 1880s lawsuit by ranch owners below the property and resulted in a ruling that allowed alternating use of the water by Singleton and other ranchers on a five-day cycle. The lawsuit was not settled until 1884, three years after the death of James Singleton. In 1911, half-brothers William H. Singleton and James Haskell bought the Clough ranch, and the former rancho was reunited as the Singleton/Haskell Ranch.

== See also ==
- Rancho San Jacinto Nuevo y Potrero
- Rancho San Jacinto Sobrante
- Rancho San Jacinto Viejo
- Ranchos of California
- List of Ranchos of California
