= Cuyamaca College =

Community college in Rancho San Diego, California, U.S.

Coordinates: 32.7445°N 116.9396°W

- Motto: Learning For The Future
- Type: Public community college
- Established: 1978
- President: Jessica Robinson
- Students: 9,922 (2016)
- Location: Rancho San Diego, California, United States
- Campus: 165 acres (67 ha)
- Colors: Blue, Sand, and White
- Nickname: Coyotes
- Sporting affiliations: CCCAA – PCAC
- Website: www.cuyamaca.edu

Cuyamaca College is a public community college in Rancho San Diego, California. It is part of the Grossmont–Cuyamaca Community College District and the California Community Colleges system. Along with Grossmont College, it serves the eastern suburbs in San Diego County. Cuyamaca College opened in 1978 and now offers 81 associate's degree programs and 66 training certification programs to approximately 8,500 students. Many of the college's students transfer to the University of California, San Diego or San Diego State University to complete their bachelor's degrees. Cuyamaca's mascot is the coyote.

== History ==
Cuyamaca College is located in the San Diego County community of Rancho San Diego on 165 acres that at one time was a part of the Old Monte Vista Ranch. Along with its sister campus, Grossmont College, it is part of the Grossmont-Cuyamaca Community College District.

The college's name comes from the Kumeyaay phrase "Ekwiiyemak," which has been translated to mean "behind the clouds," "above the rains," and "the place where the rain comes from the heavens." The name for the college was selected by the Board of Trustees, as a reflection of the Native American history and heritage of this area of San Diego County. One historian notes that "The very old Indian name 'Cuyamaca' has persisted through Spanish, Mexican and American times", and has, at various times, been "applied to mountains, lakes, valleys and ranches." Writers have interpreted the Indian meaning of the name in various ways, including "above rain" and "place where the rain comes from heavens".

The campus site was acquired by the district's board of trustees in September 1972 and the college officially opened six years later. Today, Cuyamaca College offers more than 140 degrees and certificates, serves nearly 10,000 students, and is a significant contributor to the regional workforce and economy.

The building site was acquired by the board of trustees in September 1972, and the college officially opened in the fall of 1978. The second phase of buildings was completed in January 1980. In 1989, the Learning Resource Center opened. The campus consists of twelve classroom buildings and is also the site of the Heritage of the Americas Museum and the Water Conservation Garden.

In the Spring of 1995, Rancho San Diego Parkway, the Fury Lane entrance road, was completed, providing students easier access to the college.

In the Fall of 1995, the college dedicated a new 20.3-acre (8.2 ha) physical education facility with a fitness center, gym, tennis and volleyball courts, soccer and ball fields and an Olympic-size track.

A new Student Services Center opened in the Spring 2001 to provide one-stop student services at the Rancho San Diego Parkway entrance. The Child Development Center and Math Learning Center opened in Fall 2001. On April 19, 2007, the new Science and Technology Center had its grand opening; October 11, 2007 was the new Student Center grand opening and then on January 31, 2008, the Communication Arts Center opened.

Construction implementation is occurring incrementally in response to the growing community surrounding the college and to meet the educational needs of the college district. The college, when completed, will accommodate an enrollment of approximately 15,000 students.

As Of January 1, 2009, Cuyamaca College is a smoke-free and tobacco-free campus in accordance with GCCCD Governing Board Policy BP 3560.

== Campus ==
Student demographics as of Fall 2023
Race and ethnicity	Total
White	48%
Hispanic	33%
Unknown	5%
African American	4%
Multiracial	4%
Asian	2%
Filipino	2%
American Indian/Alaska Native	1%

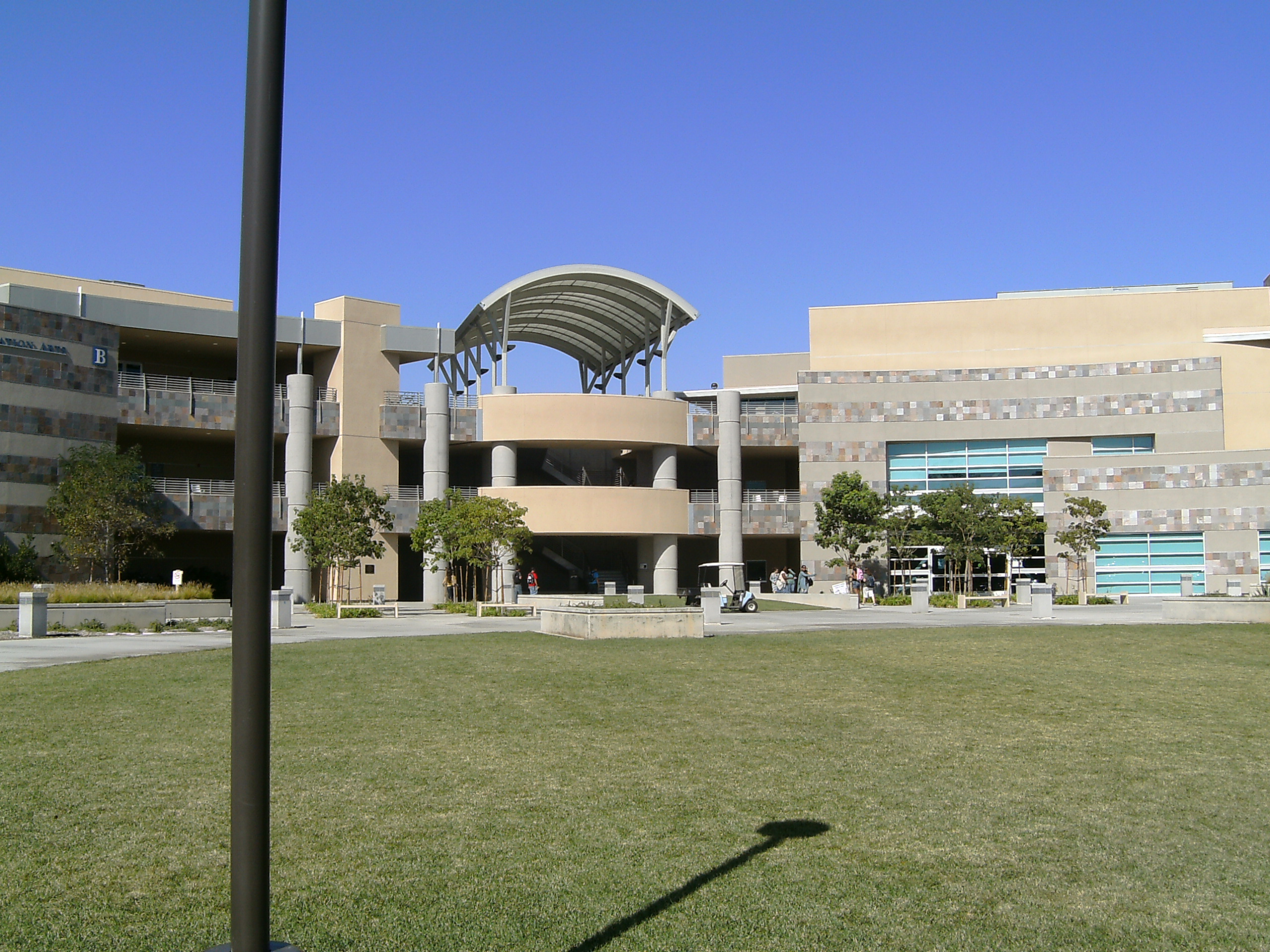
Cuyamaca College's new Communication Arts Building is the campus's most prominent feature.

The Cuyamaca college 165-acre (67 ha) main campus is located Rancho San Diego and features over 16 buildings.

The Gym and Exercise Science Building is one of the oldest buildings on the Cuymaca College campus. It was built along with what is now the F Buildings to form the original campus. This building houses the exercise science department, gymnasium, weight room, Fitness Center, locker rooms, athletic training room and athletic team rooms.

The F Building is one of the oldest buildings on the campus, built along with the D Buildings to form the original Cuymaca College. At that time the administrative offices, such as financial aid, and admissions and records, were in the F building. They were later moved to the A building. This building is used for the CAD department as well as several other departments including Psychology, Sociology, History, Political Science, Social work, and Anthropology.

The Learning Resources Center houses the Library as well as the Adaptive Technologies Center for disabled students and the Tutoring Center. The C Building was built in 1989. In December 2010, Prop R funded construction was completed on the LRC Building which expanded the floor space by enclosing existing outdoor patios. On May 6, 2017, the Cuyamaca College C-building was heavily flooded and severely damaged. The entire C-building's staff and all of the C-building's operations were temporarily moved to other locations on the Cuyamaca College campus. In order to complete the necessary repairs, the C-building is closed to most staff and students until at least the 2018 Summer Session.

This Business and CIS Building was completed in the second week of October 2009, and houses the Business And Technology Departments. It is a two-story 2 wing "figure eight" shaped building. The Business Office Technologies, Business Administration, and Graphic Design departments are located on the "front" or "east" wing, while the "back" or "west" wing houses the CIS department on the top floor and the faculty offices on the bottom floor. The first floor of the east wing contains the Open Computer Lab which provides computers, peripherals, classroom related software, study rooms, and technical assistance for students.

=== Center for Water Studies ===
This building housed the Center for Water Studies, formerly known as the Water & Wastewater Technology Program. It consists of two classrooms, a water quality analysis laboratory, and backflow testing & equipment repair shop. The CWS also includes the Field Operations Skills Yard which provides hand on skill building activities rated to the water & wastewater industry.

=== Heritage of the Americas Museum ===
This building houses the Heritage of the Americas Museum. Its five wings divide the building into areas of Natural history, Archaeology, Anthropology, prehistoric and historic Art, and Education, of the Americas.

The museum is surrounded by a botanical garden with different plant collections. One is the Water Conservation Garden At Cuyamaca College, a public demonstration garden of drought tolerant plants and water conserving gardening and landscape design.

== Athletics ==
The college's mascot.

Cuyamaca College's athletic teams are known as the Coyotes. The college competes as a member of the California Community College Athletic Association (CCCAA) in the Pacific Coast Athletic Conference (PCAC). The athletic program contains eleven men's and women's varsity teams. Men's sports are basketball, cross country, golf, soccer, and track and field; women's sports are cross country, golf, soccer, tennis, track and field, and volleyball.
