= Steele Canyon High School =

Coordinates: 32°43′47″N 116°55′30″W

Steele Canyon Charter High School
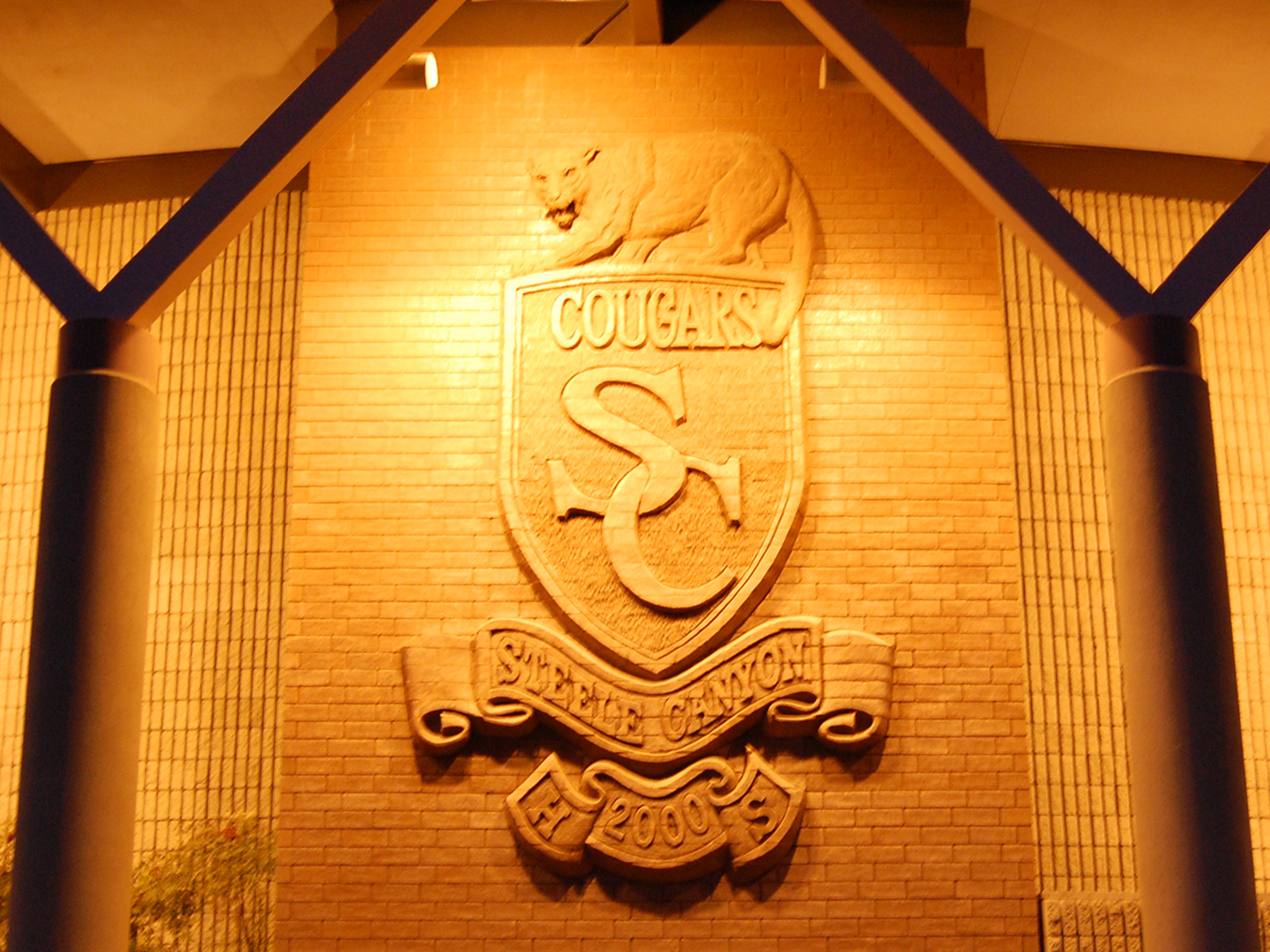

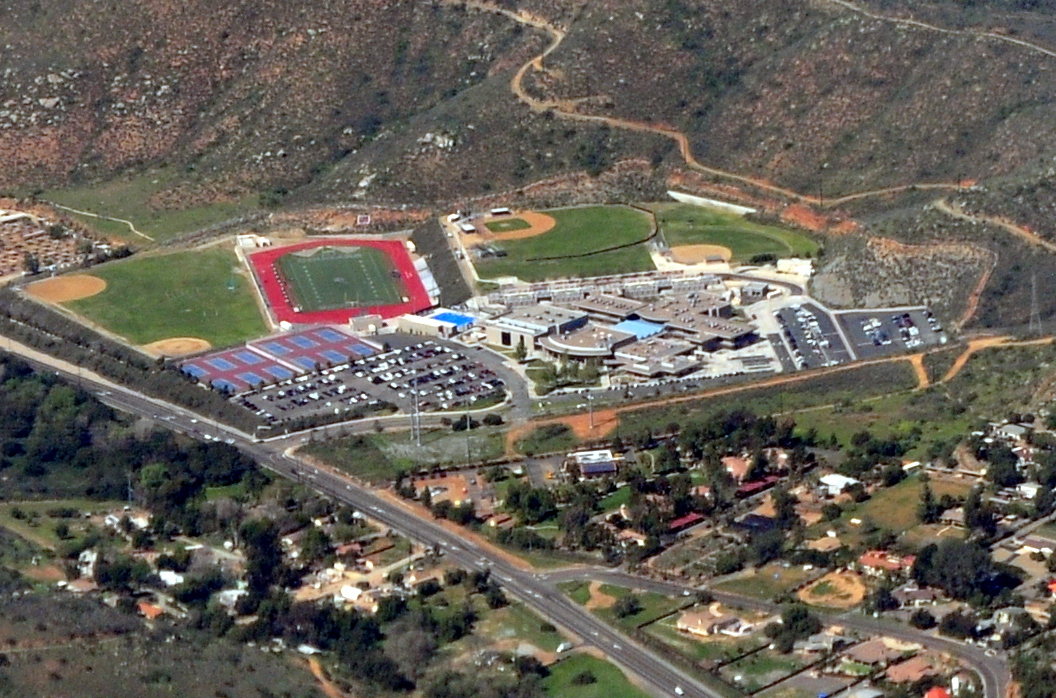
- Aerial view from the southeast

Location
- 12440 Campo Road; Spring Valley, California; United States

Information
- Type: California Public Charter High School
- Motto: "You Can't Bend Steele"
- Established: 2001
- Founder: Garrett Stein
- Principal: Scott Parr
- Teaching staff: 89.27 (FTE)
- Grades: 9–12
- Enrollment: 2,147 (2023-2024)
- Student to teacher ratio: 24.05
- Colors: Navy blue, cardinal red, white
- Mascot: Scratch the Cougar
- Nickname: Cougars
- Accreditation: Western Association of Schools and Colleges (WASC)
- Website: Steele Canyon High School

Steele Canyon Charter High School is a public charter high school in Spring Valley, San Diego County, California, United States. Opened in 2000, the school serves students in grades nine through twelve. It has operated as a California charter school since July 1, 2007. Steele Canyon's main rival is Valhalla High School. Steele Canyon served as an evacuation center for San Diego residents threatened by the Harris fire, one of the larger October 2007 California wildfires.

== Athletics ==
Basketball coach Brad Leaf coached the Steele Canyon High School boys basketball team to a 30-2 record in 2004, and CIF San Diego Section boys basketball titles in 2004 and 2005

== Notable alumni ==
- Andrew Bellatti, baseball player for the Tampa Bay Rays
- Nick Vogel, volleyball player
- Alex Vesia, baseball player for the Los Angeles Dodgers
- Joel Quartuccio, singer for melodic post-hardcore band Being As An Ocean

== Notable faculty ==
- Brad Leaf, American-Israeli basketball player for Hapoel Galil Elyon and Maccabi Tel Aviv of the Israel Premier League, coach

== See also ==
- List of high schools in San Diego County, California
- List of high schools in California
