= Rancho San Jacinto Nuevo y Potrero =

Mexican land grant in California

Coordinates: 33.860°N 117.160°W

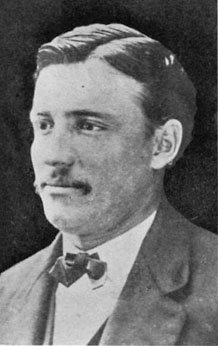
Miguel de Pedrorena was granted Rancho San Jacinto Nuevo y Potrero in 1846.

Rancho San Jacinto Nuevo y Potrero was a 48,861-acre (197.73 km^{2}) Mexican land grant in present-day Riverside County, California given in 1846 by Governor Pío Pico to Miguel Pedrorena. At the time of the US Patent, Rancho San Jacinto Nuevo y Potrero was a part of San Diego County. The County of Riverside was created by the California Legislature in 1893 by taking land from both San Bernardino and San Diego Counties. The grant encompassed present-day Lake Perris. It also included the community of Lakeview and the Davis Road Unit of San Jacinto Wildlife Area.

== History ==
Miguel Pedrorena (1808–1850) was married to Antonia Estudillo, daughter of José Antonio Estudillo, grantee of Rancho San Jacinto Viejo. José Antonio Estudillo was appointed administrator and major domo at Mission San Luis Rey in 1840. Three grants, comprising over 133,000 acres (538 km^{2}) of the former Mission San Luis Rey lands in the San Jacinto area were made to the Estudillo family: Rancho San Jacinto Viejo to José Antonio Estudillo in 1842; Rancho San Jacinto Sobrante to his daughter, María del Rosario Estudillo, in 1846; and Rancho San Jacinto Nuevo y Potrero to his son-in-law, Miguel Pedrorena, in 1846.

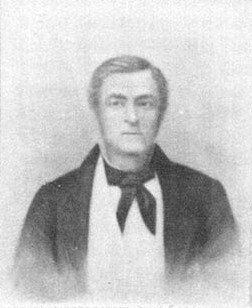
José Antonio Aguirre purchased the rancho in 1853.

With the cession of California to the United States following the Mexican-American War, the 1848 Treaty of Guadalupe Hidalgo provided that the land grants would be honored. As required by the Land Act of 1851, a claim for Rancho San Jacinto Nuevo y Potrero was filed with the Public Land Commission in 1852, and the grant was patented to T. W. Sutherland, guardian of the minor children of Miguel Pedrorena in 1883.

In 1853, José Antonio Aguirre (1799–1860) of Rancho San Jacinto Sobrante bought Rancho San Jacinto Nuevo y Potrero from the estate of Miguel Pedrorena.

== See also ==
- Rancho San Jacinto Sobrante
- Rancho San Jacinto Viejo
- Rancho San Jacinto y San Gorgonio
- Ranchos of California
- List of Ranchos of California
