= Rancho San Diego, California =

Rancho San Diego
- Census designated place
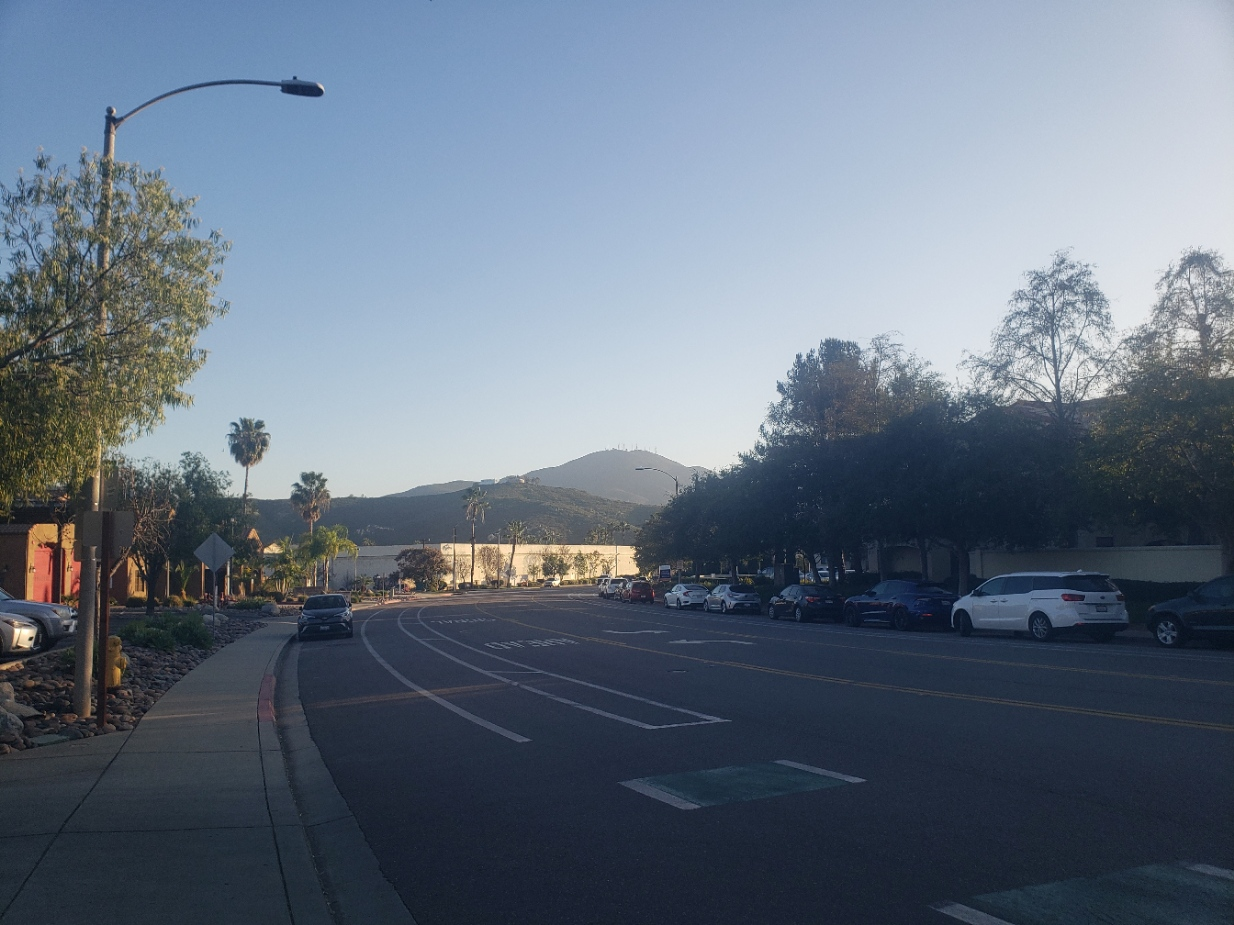
- Rancho San Diego Library view of San Miguel Mountain.
- Interactive map of Rancho San Diego
- Location in the United States
- Coordinates: 32°45′58″N 116°55′17″W
- Country: United States
- State: California
- County: San Diego
- County service area established: 1970

Area
  - Total: 8.697 sq mi (22.524 km^{2})
  - Land: 8.697 sq mi (22.524 km^{2})
  - Water: 0 sq mi (0 km^{2}) 0%
- Elevation: 360 ft (110 m)

Population (April 1, 2020)
  - Total: 21,858
  - Density: 2,513.4/sq mi (970.43/km^{2})
- Time zone: UTC-8 (Pacific)
  - Summer (DST): UTC-7 (PDT)
- ZIP codes: 91941, 91978, 92019
- Area code: 619
- FIPS code: 06-59550
- GNIS feature ID: 1867053

Rancho San Diego is a census-designated place (CDP) in the East County region of San Diego County, California. The population was 21,858 at the 2020 census, up from 21,208 at the 2010 census. The area was developed as subdivisions beginning in the 1970s.

== Geography ==
Rancho San Diego is located at 32°45′58″N 116°55′17″W (32.765985, -116.921477). According to the United States Census Bureau, the CDP has a total area of 8.7 square miles (23 km^{2}), all land. The chance of earthquake damage in Rancho San Diego is much lower than California average and is much higher than the national average. The risk of tornado damage in Rancho San Diego is about the same as California average and is much lower than the national average. The average temperature of Rancho San Diego is 64.73 °F.

=== Climate ===
According to the Köppen climate classification system, Rancho San Diego has a warm-summer Mediterranean climate, abbreviated "Csa" on climate maps.

== Demographics ==
Historical population
Census	Pop.	Note	%±
1990	6,977		—
2000	20,155		188.9%
2010	21,208		5.2%
2020	21,858		3.1%
U.S. Decennial Census; 1860–1870 1880-1890; 1900 1910 1920; 1930 1940 1950; 1960 1970 1980; 1990 2000 2010; 2020

Rancho San Diego was first listed as a census designated place in the 1990 U.S. census.

=== Racial and ethnic composition ===
Rancho San Diego CDP, California – Racial and ethnic composition Note: the US Census treats Hispanic/Latino as an ethnic category. This table excludes Latinos from the racial categories and assigns them to a separate category. Hispanics/Latinos may be of any race.
Race / Ethnicity (NH = Non-Hispanic)	Pop 2000	Pop 2010	Pop 2020	% 2000	% 2010	% 2020
White alone (NH)	15,583	15,503	15,464	77.32%	73.10%	70.75%
Black or African American alone (NH)	635	776	694	3.15%	3.66%	3.18%
Native American or Alaska Native alone (NH)	79	63	73	0.39%	0.30%	0.33%
Asian alone (NH)	799	894	871	3.96%	4.22%	3.98%
Native Hawaiian or Pacific Islander alone (NH)	52	45	58	0.26%	0.21%	0.27%
Other race alone (NH)	53	41	90	0.26%	0.19%	0.41%
Mixed race or Multiracial (NH)	777	769	1,033	3.86%	3.63%	4.73%
Hispanic or Latino (any race)	2,177	3,117	3,575	10.80%	14.70%	16.36%
Total	20,155	21,208	21,858	100.00%	100.00%	100.00%

=== 2020 census ===
As of the 2020 census, Rancho San Diego had a population of 21,858 and a population density of 2,513.6 inhabitants per square mile (970.5/km^{2}). The median age was 42.7 years; 20.7% were under the age of 18, 8.4% were 18 to 24, 23.3% were 25 to 44, 27.2% were 45 to 64, and 20.5% were 65 years of age or older. For every 100 females there were 95.4 males, and for every 100 females age 18 and over there were 91.0 males age 18 and over.

The census reported that 99.5% of residents lived in households, 0.4% lived in non-institutionalized group quarters, and 0.1% were institutionalized. 99.8% of residents lived in urban areas, while 0.2% lived in rural areas.

There were 7,854 households; 31.5% had children under the age of 18 living in them. Of all households, 58.4% were married-couple households, 13.5% had a male householder with no spouse or partner present, and 24.2% had a female householder with no spouse or partner present. About 20.6% of all households were made up of individuals and 11.5% had someone living alone who was 65 years of age or older. There were 5,865 families (74.7% of all households).

There were 8,138 housing units at an average density of 935.8 units per square mile (361.3 units/km^{2}), of which 7,854 (96.5%) were occupied. Of these, 69.7% were owner-occupied, and 30.3% were occupied by renters. The homeowner vacancy rate was 0.6%, and the rental vacancy rate was 4.0%.

Racial composition as of the 2020 census
Race	Number	Percent
White	16,381	74.9%
Black or African American	739	3.4%
American Indian and Alaska Native	147	0.7%
Asian	910	4.2%
Native Hawaiian and Other Pacific Islander	73	0.3%
Some other race	1,147	5.2%
Two or more races	2,461	11.3%
Hispanic or Latino (of any race)	3,575	16.4%

=== 2023 American Community Survey estimates ===
In 2023, the US Census Bureau estimated that of those aged 25 or older, 92.8% were high school graduates and 44.5% had a bachelor's degree.

The median household income in 2023 was $118,431, and the per capita income was $55,280. About 6.6% of families and 6.9% of the population were below the poverty line.

=== 2010 census ===
The census reported that 21,164 people (99.8% of the population) lived in households, 44 (0.2%) lived in non-institutionalized group quarters, and no one was institutionalized.

There were 7,830 households, 2,659 (34.0%) had children under the age of 18 living in them, 4,605 (58.8%) were opposite-sex married couples living together, 834 (10.7%) had a female householder with no husband present, 330 (4.2%) had a male householder with no wife present. There were 311 (4.0%) unmarried opposite-sex partnerships, and 62 (0.8%) same-sex married couples or partnerships. 1,653 households (21.1%) were one person and 713 (9.1%) had someone living alone who was 65 or older. The average household size was 2.70. There were 5,769 families (73.7% of households); the average family size was 3.16.

The age distribution was 4,681 people (22.1%) under the age of 18, 2,124 people (10%) aged 18 to 24, 4,867 people (22.9%) aged 25 to 44, 6,688 people (31.5%) aged 45 to 64, and 2,848 people (13.4%) who were 65 or older. The median age was 41.2 years. For every 100 females, there were 94.1 males. For every 100 females age 18 and over, there were 91.3 males.

There were 8,152 housing units at an average density of 936.9 per square mile, of the occupied units 5,580 (71.3%) were owner-occupied and 2,250 (28.7%) were rented. The homeowner vacancy rate was 0.8%; the rental vacancy rate was 6.5%. 15,530 people (73.2% of the population) lived in owner-occupied housing units and 5,634 people (26.6%) lived in rental housing units.

== Government ==
In the California State Legislature, Rancho San Diego is in the 39th senatorial district, represented by Democrat Akilah Weber Pierson, and in the 75th Assembly district, represented by Republican Carl DeMaio.

In the United States House of Representatives, Rancho San Diego is in California's 48th congressional district, represented by Republican Darrell Issa.

County Service Area No. 26 (Rancho San Diego) provides landscape and open-space maintenance.

== Schools ==
Rancho San Diego is served by Cajon Valley Union School District and Grossmont Union High School District.

Steele Canyon High School and Valhalla High School are the primary high schools in this location.

Rancho San Diego is also home to Cuyamaca College, as well as Kumeyaay Community College.
