= Valhalla High School (California) =

Public school established in 1974

Location
- 1725 Hillsdale Road; El Cajon, California 92019; 32°45′38.74″N 116°55′16.18″W

Information
- School type: Public, High School
- Established: 1974
- Status: Open
- School district: Grossmont Union High School District
- NCES District ID: 0616230.
- Superintendent: Theresa Kemper
- NCES School ID: 061623002028.
- Principal: Joshua Johnson
- Staff: 125
- Teaching staff: 10.55 (FTE)
- Grades: 9-12
- Age: 13 to 18
- Enrollment: 1,845 (2023-2024)
- Student to teacher ratio: 174.88
- Classes offered: Comprehensive
- Language: American English
- Hours in school day: Up to 7h 35m
- Classrooms: 85
- Campus type: Closed
- Colors: Orange and White with Navy trims
- Athletics: List: Cross Country; Golf; Volleyball; Football; Tennis; Water Polo; Field Hockey; Basketball; Soccer; Wrestling; Baseball; Lacrosse; Softball; Track and Field; Swimming and Diving; Gymnastics
- Mascot: Thor
- Accreditation: Western Association of Schools and Colleges
- Newspaper: The Saga
- Yearbook: Ragnarok
- School fees: None
- Communities served: Rancho San Diego, Southern El Cajon
- Website: http://valhalla.guhsd.net

Valhalla High School is a public high school in Rancho San Diego, California. It is operated by Grossmont Union High School District with an enrollment of 2,112 students. The school is characterized by its school colors, orange and white, going by the nickname Orange Nation. During its existence, the school has won the California Distinguished School Award in both 2001 and 2003, and is also accredited by the Western Association of Schools and Colleges. The school is currently directed by principal Joshua Johnson and three assistant principals.

== History ==
Upon opening in 1974, the school had a very different open campus atmosphere, with a college-like schedule. The school was centered around the main building, with open-air classrooms. Reflective of this, the original motto was "Freedom with Responsibility".

During the 1980s, the school transitioned to a more traditional open campus, although some unique architectural elements remain.

== Campus ==
The original school was built in 1974. Valhalla's main structure is a five-story octagonal building. Originally orange, the trim of the building was painted blue in 2009. Classrooms are situated along the outside wall and center of the building. The gymnasiums are freestanding.

Sports facilities include a football and soccer field, baseball diamonds, basketball, tennis and volleyball courts, and two swimming pools.

A new, freestanding, two-story building that houses 12 science classrooms is currently in use. The building was proposed in order to make more room for teachers. It was dedicated in May 2010.

In 2015, The main building was closed for renovation and repair of the inner structure. Temporary classrooms took their place for humanities and elective classes. In the 2016-17 school year, students returned to the main building for instruction, and the temporary classrooms were removed.

== Notable alumni ==
- Tony Clark, Major League baseball player.
- Eric Close, Actor. Class of 1985.
- Brad Daluiso, NFL kicker.
- Amy Finley, The Gourmet Next Door host on the Food Network.
- Broc Glover, Motocross National Champion.
- Greg Garcia, professional baseball player.
- Dan Gookin, Mayor of Coeur d'Alene, Idaho, and Author of the First "...For Dummies" Books.
- Ryan Hansen, actor.
- Benjamin Howard, filmmaker
- Darrell Long, notable computer scientist.
- Greg Louganis, Class of 1978. Four-time Olympic Games gold medalist in diving.
- Sean O'Sullivan, MLB pitcher.
- Jason Russell, co-founder of Invisible Children.
