= Miguel de Pedrorena =

American politician (1808–1850)

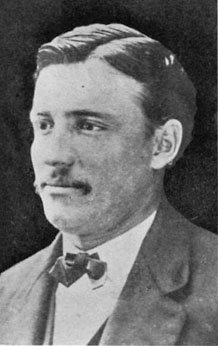
- Portrait held by the Doheny Library at the University of Southern California

Acting Alcalde of San Diego
- In office 1846

Personal details
- Born: 1808 Madrid, Spain
- Died: March 21, 1850 (aged 41–42) San Diego, California Territory, U.S.
- Resting place: Pioneer Park (San Diego); 32.7492°N 117.1776°W
- Spouse: María Antonia Estudillo (m. 1841)
- Children: 4
- Profession: Ranchero, merchant

Don Miguel de Pedrorena (c. 1808 – March 21, 1850) was a Spanish-born Californio ranchero, merchant, and a signer of the California Constitution in 1849. He also served briefly as acting Alcalde of San Diego (mayor).

== Life ==
Miguel Pedrorena was born in Madrid and later lived in Peru. He moved to San Diego in 1838 and became a business partner of José Antonio Aguirre, who later became his brother-in-law. In 1841, he married María Antonia Estudillo, daughter of José Antonio Estudillo and María Victoria Dominguez. They had a son: Miguel Telesford de Pedrorena (b.1844), who married Elena 'Nellie' Burton; and three daughters: María Victoria de Pedrorena (b.1842), who married Henry C. Magee; María Ysabel de Pedrorena (b.1846), who married José Antonio Altamirano; and Elena de Pedrorena (b. abt 1848), who married José Wolfskill.

The following sketch of Pedrorena is from William Heath Davis, Sixty Years in California (1889)

In 1838 Don Miguel de Pedrorena, a resident of Peru, arrived here, being at the part time owner and supercargo of the Delmira. ... Don Miguel was a native of Spain, and belonged to one of the best families of Madrid. After receiving an education in his own country he was sent to London, where he was educated in English, becoming a complete scholar. Most of the Castilian race of the upper class are proud and aristocratic; but Don Miguel, though of high birth, was exceedingly affable, polite, gracious in manner and bearing, and, in every respect, a true gentleman. He married a daughter of Prefect Estudillo and resided in San Diego until the time of his death on March 21, 1850, leaving three children. He was a member of the convention at Monterey in 1849, for the formation of the state constitution. He owned the Cajon Rancho and the San Jacinto Nuevo Rancho, each containing eleven leagues, with some cattle and horses. Notwithstanding these large holdings of lands he was in rather straitened circumstances in his later years, and so much in need of money that when I visited San Diego in the early part of 1850 he offered to sell me thirty-two quarterblocks (102 lots) in San Diego at a low figure. He had acquired the property in the winter of 1849–50, at the alcalde's <mayor's> sale. I did not care for the land but being flush and having a large income from my business, I took the land, paying him thirteen or fourteen hundred dollars for it. In Madrid he had several brothers and other relatives, one of his brothers being, at that time a Minister in the cabinet of the reigning monarch. During the last two or three years of his life those relatives became aware of his unfortunate circumstances and wrote to him repeatedly, urging him to come home to Spain and bring his family with him. They sent him means and assured him that he would be welcomed. Though poor, his proud disposition led him to decline all these offers. Popular with everybody in the department, the recollections of him by those who knew him were exceedingly pleasant.

During the Mexican–American War Pedrorena supported the U.S. side, fighting at Fort Stockton. As with other prominent Californio families, he found war was inevitable and a lost cause. During the war, he commanded a cavalry as captain on the American side. In 1846, Pedrorena served as Juez de Paz of San Diego, in absence of José Antonio Estudillo. During 1847–1848, he became the U.S customs collector.

In early 1850, Pedrorena, with William Heath Davis and others, formed a partnership to develop a new townsite south of the existing town of San Diego, closer to San Diego Bay. This venture soon failed due to several factors including the absence of fresh water, its location in marshlands, and lack of support. Twenty years later, however, New Town did succeed with a subdivision, Alonzo Horton's New San Diego (now downtown San Diego), just east of the aborted townsite.

Miguel Pedrorena died suddenly on March 31, 1850 and was buried in Old Town.

== Legacy ==
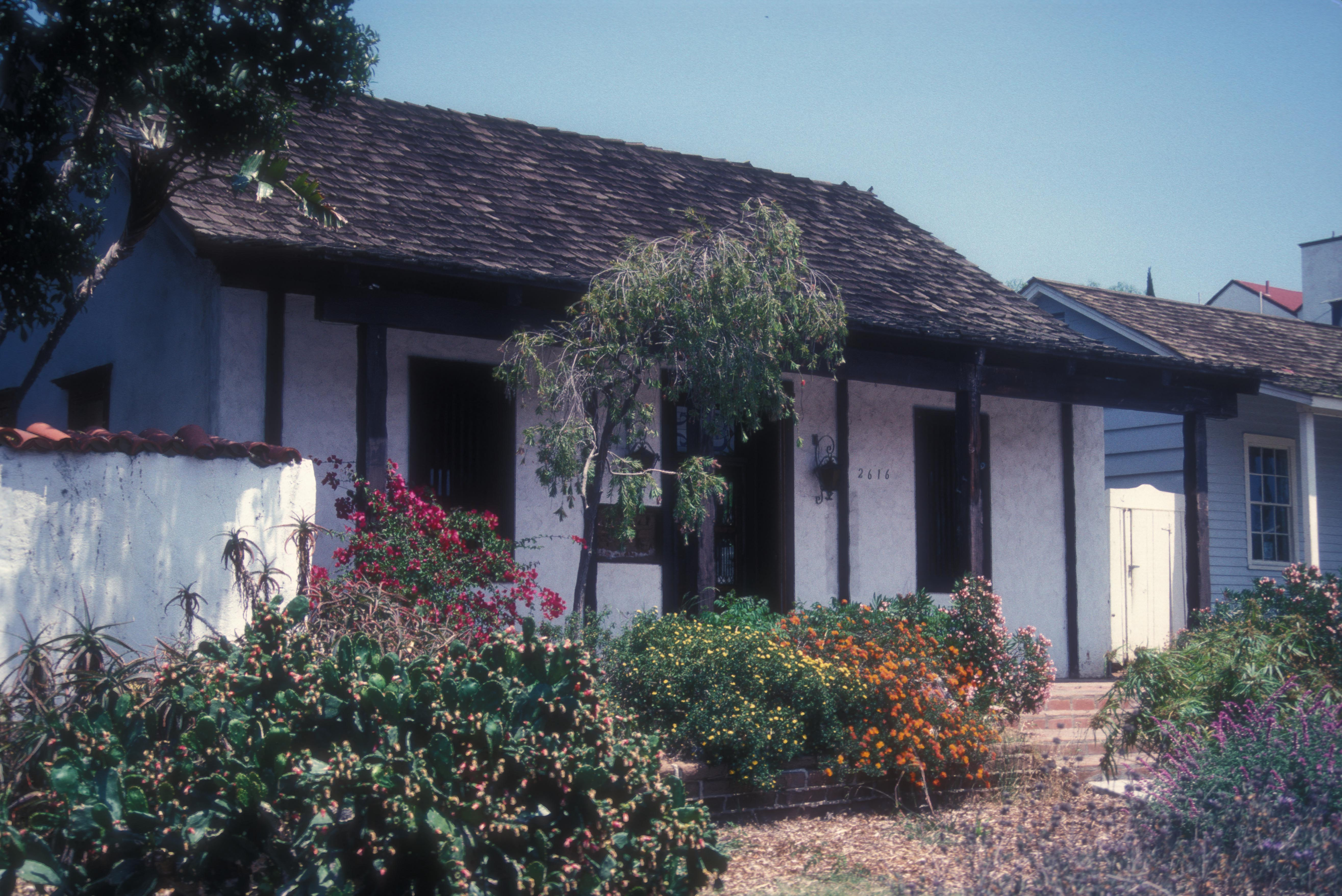
Casa de Pedrorena de Altamirano at Old Town San Diego State Historic Park.

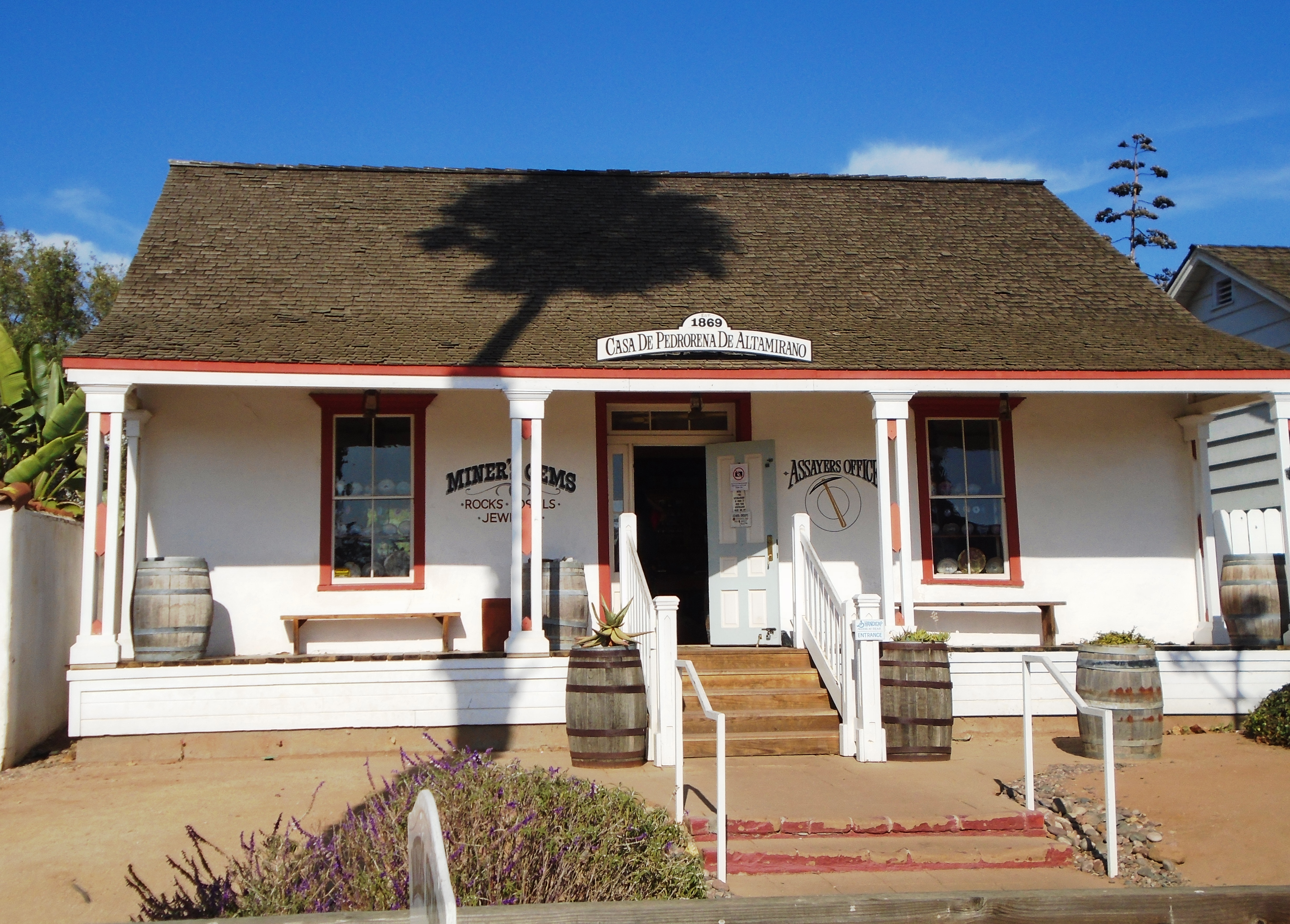
2019 Altamirano-Pedrorena House

After his death, his widow and family built houses and corrals at Rancho El Cajon for their stock, and harvested large crops from the land, but his wife died shortly thereafter, February 3, 1851. Their heirs began to sell this land during the Civil War.

The Altamirano-Pedrorena House in Old Town San Diego State Historic Park was built by his son Miguel Telesford de Pedrorena in 1869 but was inherited by Miguel Telesford de Pedrorena's sister, Ysabel de Pedrorena Altamirano in 1871; it remained in use as a family residence until 1907. It is open to the public as a gem shop, at 2616 San Diego Avenue (Garden Street), next to the San Diego Union Museum.
