= Clay French =

American mixed martial artist

- Born: October 7, 1980 (age 46); Villa Park, Illinois, United States
- Height: 1.67 m (5 ft 6 in)
- Weight: 70 kg (154 lb; 11 st 0 lb)
- Division: Lightweight
- Style: MMA, Submission wrestling
- Stance: Southpaw
- Fighting out of: Schaumburg, Illinois
- Team: H.I.T. Squad, Gilbert Grappling
- Years active: 2004–2014

Mixed martial arts record
- Total: 25
- Wins: 19
- By knockout: 2
- By submission: 11
- By decision: 6
- Losses: 6
- By knockout: 1
- By submission: 5

Other information
- Mixed martial arts record from Sherdog

Clayton "Clay" French (born October 7, 1980) is an American mixed martial artist who fought on Pride Fighting Championships, Sengoku, KOTC and other several fighting organizations. He holds a notable victory over TUF winner Mac Danzig by split decision and has trained with former UFC welterweight champion Matt Hughes.

== Biography ==
Clay wrestled at Eastern Illinois University where he was coached by Matt Hughes who turned him on to Mixed martial arts. Clay became a KOTC lightweight title holder. He has since started fighting at Sengoku in Japan and he enjoys the Japanese fighting culture. he then began fighting in Titan Fighting Championships. Clay was the head coach of wrestling at St. Laurence High School from 2015-2017. Before Clay moved to Morton Freshman center, he worked as a computer teacher in a school nearby, Burnham Elementary. Clay has since moved to be a teacher at Morton Freshman Center in Cicero, IL. In the 2017-2018 School year, he is a teacher in the TSI department, a part of the school meant to teach students how to work with computers.

== Championships and Accomplishments ==
=== Mixed Martial Arts ===
- King of the Cage
  - King of the Cage World Lightweight Champion (One time)
  - Three successful title defenses
- Extreme Challenge
  - Extreme Challenge 70 Four-Man Lightweight Tournament Finalist

== Mixed martial arts record ==
Professional record breakdown
26 matches	19 wins	7 losses
By knockout	2	2
By submission	11	5
By decision	6	0

Res.	Record	Opponent	Method	Event	Date	Round	Time	Location	Notes
Loss	19–7	Thiago Meller	TKO (punches)	XFCI - International 1	February 8, 2014	1	3:39	Sao Paulo, Brazil	
Win	19–6	James Krause	Decision (split)	Titan Fighting Championships 19	July 29, 2011	3	5:00	Kansas City, Kansas, United States	
Win	18–6	Billy Stamp	Decision (split)	Ruckus Entertainment: Ruckus Invades Navy Pier	September 11, 2010	3	5:00	Chicago, Illinois, United States	
Win	17–6	Sean Wilson	Submission (rear-naked choke)	KOTC: Turbulence 2	April 24, 2010	1	3:39	Lac du Flambeau (town), Wisconsin, United States	
Loss	16–6	Eiji Mitsuoka	Submission (guillotine choke)	World Victory Road Presents: Sengoku 9	August 2, 2009	1	1:51	Saitama, Saitama, Japan	
Win	16–5	Bryan Neville	Submission (neck crank)	KOTC: The Renewal	June 20, 2009	1	0:28	Indianapolis, Indiana, United States	
Loss	15–5	Michael Johnson	Submission (kimura)	FFC - Fuel Fight Club	April 10, 2009	1	3:16	Lake Ozark, Missouri, United States	
Loss	15–4	Rory MacDonald	KO (punches)	KOTC - Grinder	November 28, 2008	2	4:26	Calgary, Alberta, Canada	Lost the KOTC Lightweight Championship.
Loss	15–3	Satoru Kitaoka	Submission (achilles lock)	World Victory Road Presents: Sengoku 4	August 24, 2008	1	0:31	Saitama, Saitama, Japan	Sengoku 2008 lightweight tournament opening round
Win	15–2	Jameel Massouh	Submission (rear-naked choke)	AMMA 1 - Adrenaline MMA 1	June 14, 2008	2	3:17	Chicago, Illinois, United States	
Win	14–2	Jason Ireland	Decision (unanimous)	KOTC: Bad Boys	November 21, 2007	3	5:00	Mount Pleasant, Michigan, United States	Defended the KOTC Lightweight Championship.
Win	13–2	Bobby Mosley	Submission (armbar)	Mainstream MMA 7 - Vengeance	October 20, 2007	1	1:29	Cedar Rapids, Iowa, United States	
Win	12–2	Sam Jackson	Submission (rear naked choke)	EC 82 - Extreme Challenge 82	August 18, 2007	1	4:22	Springfield, Illinois, United States	
Win	11–2	Buddy Clinton	TKO (cut)	KOTC: Collision Course	August 5, 2007	3	3:26	San Jacinto, California, United States	Defended the KOTC Lightweight Championship.
Win	10–2	Buddy Clinton	Decision (split)	KOTC: Damage Control	May 26, 2007	3	5:00	Chicago, Illinois, United States	Defended the KOTC Lightweight Championship.
Win	9–2	Dominic Bjerke	TKO	CFC 8 - Courage Fighting Championships 8	April 21, 2007	1	1:18	Decatur, Illinois, United States	
Win	8–2	Mac Danzig	Decision (split)	KOTC: Hard Knocks	January 19, 2007	3	5:00	Rockford, Illinois, United States	Won the KOTC Lightweight Championship.
Loss	7–2	Shinya Aoki	Submission (flying triangle choke)	Pride - Bushido 13	November 5, 2006	1	3:57	Yokohama, Japan	
Loss	7–1	Justin James	Submission (armbar)	EC 70 - Extreme Challenge 70	August 26, 2006	1	2:06	Hayward, Wisconsin, United States	Extreme Challenge 70 four-man lightweight tournament finals
Win	7–0	Alonzo Martinez	Submission (rear-naked choke)	EC 70 - Extreme Challenge 70	August 26, 2006	1	3:34	Hayward, Wisconsin, United States	Extreme Challenge 70 four-man lightweight tournament opening round
Win	6–0	James Kugler	Submission (choke)	CFC 6 - Courage Fighting Championships 6	July 15, 2006	1	N/A	Decatur, Illinois, United States	
Win	5–0	Alex Carter	Submission (armbar)	IC 29 - Iowa Challenge 29	June 10, 2006	1	0:16	Quincy, Illinois, United States	
Win	4–0	Norm Alexander	Submission (armbar)	CFC 5 - Courage Fighting Championships 5	April 29, 2006	1	4:45	Decatur, Illinois, United States	
Win	3–0	Josh Arocho	Submission (rear-naked choke)	XFO 7 - Outdoor War	August 27, 2005	1	3:28	Island Lake, Illinois, United States	
Win	2–0	Joe Veres	Submission (guillotine choke)	CFC 2 - Courage Fighting Championships 2	March 26, 2005	2	0:59	Decatur, Illinois, United States	
Win	1–0	Eric Gwaltney	Decision (unanimous)	SC 19 - Silverback Classic 19	August 13, 2004	2	5:00	Canton, Illinois, United States	
