= Keith Berry (fighter) =

American mixed martial arts fighter

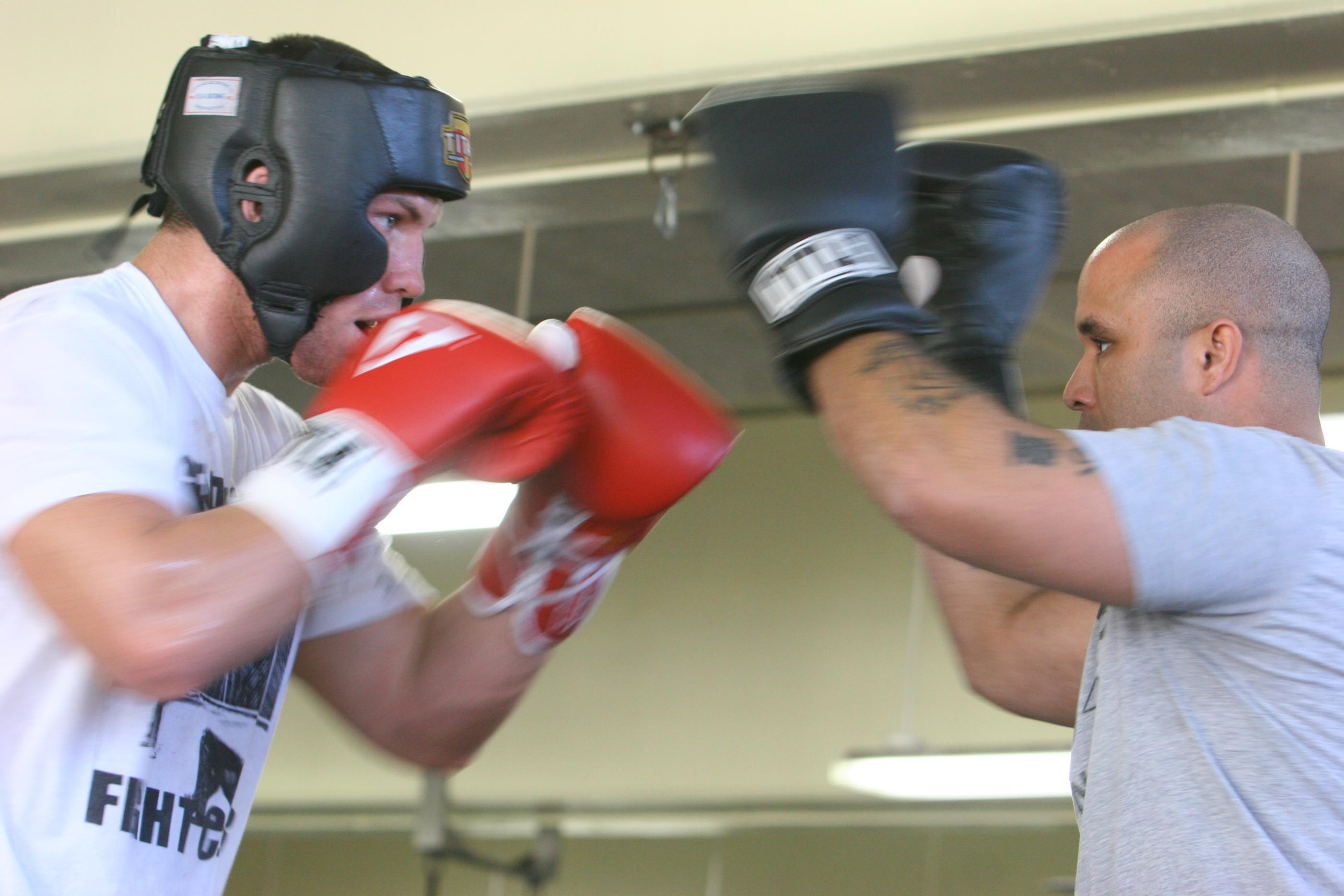
- Berry sparring with Camp Pendleton boxing team coach in 2009.
- Born: Keith Adam Berry; October 25, 1987 (age 38); Murrieta, California, United States
- Other names: The K.O. Kid
- Height: 6 ft 1 in (1.85 m)
- Weight: 184.8 lb (83.8 kg; 13.20 st)
- Division: Light Heavyweight; Middleweight
- Reach: 73.5 in (187 cm)
- Stance: Orthodox
- Fighting out of: Murrieta, California, United States
- Team: Dan Henderson’s Athletic & Fitness Center
- Years active: 2005–2019

Mixed martial arts record
- Total: 34
- Wins: 17
- By knockout: 12
- By submission: 3
- By decision: 1
- By disqualification: 1
- Losses: 15
- By knockout: 8
- By submission: 3
- By decision: 4
- Draws: 1
- No contests: 1

Other information
- Notable school: Murrieta Valley High School
- Mixed martial arts record from Sherdog

Keith Berry (born October 25, 1987) is an American mixed martial artist who competed in Bellator's Middleweight division. A professional fighter since 2005, Berry has formerly fought for the WEC, Strikeforce, King of the Cage and Elite XC ShoXC. Berry is the former 2x King of the Cage Middleweight Champion.

== Background ==
Berry is from Murrieta, California, and attended Murrieta Valley High School where he competed in wrestling. Despite having a quiet personality, Berry got into wrestling in high school and was introduced to boxing. In 2019 Berry entered the crypto scene and it currently one of the biggest NFT Influencers

== Mixed martial arts career ==
=== Early career: World Extreme Cagefighting and King of the Cage ===
Berry started his career in 2005 for the California-based promotions King of the Cage and World Extreme Cagefighting. On his two bouts for WEC, he won against Donny Rider and lost against Terry Martin. For KOTC, he won five bouts and the middleweight title, remaining undefeated in the organization until his light heavyweight title fight against Tony Lopez, in which he lost via TKO in the third round due to his coach throwing in the towel against his request.

=== Gladiator Challenge ===
Between 2009 and 2010, Berry fought four times for Gladiator Challenge, obtaining four consecutive victories and holding two of the fastest KO in MMA history (5 and 6 seconds). Despite having lost against Brett Cooper at Pechanga Casino’s very first MMA event Lords of Chaos, in 2011 Berry signed with Strikeforce.

=== Strikeforce ===
Berry made his debut on June 24, 2011, on Strikeforce Challengers: Fodor vs. Terry against Trevor Smith. He lost via technical submission in the second round.

Berry faced Gian Villante on August 12, 2011, at Strikeforce Challengers: Gurgel vs. Duarte. He lost via unanimous decision.

Berry was expected to face Andreas Spång on November 18, 2012, at Strikeforce Challengers: Britt vs. Sayers. However, for undisclosed reasons he was forced out of the bout and was replaced by Willie Parks.

Berry faced Adlan Amagov on April 14, 2012, at Strikeforce: Rousey vs. Kaufman. He lost via TKO in the first round. The ruling was controversial as Amagov seemed to throw a linear kick to the knee of Berry an illegal strike under the Unified Rules of MMA. The kick caused Berry to fall down. Berry then began verbally protesting to the referee Herb Dean, who interpreted this as Berry requesting to stop the fight. Many fighters, including 2 time PRIDE FC Champion Dan Henderson posted on social media saying this was Herb Deans “worst stoppage ever”.

After two victories on Xplode Fight Series, Berry signed with Bellator.

=== Bellator ===
Berry made his debut on March 7, 2013, at Bellator 92 against Richard Rigmaden. He won via submission in the first round.

Berry faced Cortez Coleman on June 19, 2013, at Bellator 96. He won via split decision (28-29, 29–28, 29-28).

Berry faced Jeremy Kimball on July 31, 2013, at Bellator 97. He was knocked out in the 2nd round of the bout.

Berry faced Eugene Fadiora on October 25, 2013, at Bellator 105. He lost via TKO in the second round.

Berry then faced Dave Vitkay on April 11, 2014, at Bellator 116. Berry lost the bout via unanimous decision.

Berry was released from the promotion on June 25, 2014.

Despite being released in June 2014, Berry returned to face Joe Pacheco on October 3, 2014, at Bellator 127. He initially won the fight by split decision. However, Berry failed his post-fight drug test (Marijuana metabolites) and the California commission changed the result to a No Contest.

== Championships and accomplishments ==
=== Mixed martial arts ===
- King of the Cage
  - KOTC Middleweight Championship (One time)
  - One successful title defense
- Xplode Fight Series
  - XFS Middleweight Championship (One time)

== Mixed martial arts record ==
Professional record breakdown
34 matches	17 wins	15 losses
By knockout	12	8
By submission	3	3
By decision	1	4
By disqualification	1	0
Draws	1	
No contests	1	

Res.	Record	Opponent	Method	Event	Date	Round	Time	Location	Notes
Win	17–15–1 (1)	Jayce Bowman	TKO (punches)	Gladiator Challenge: Holiday Beatings	December 4, 2019	2	0:50	San Jacinto, California, United States	
Win	16–15–1 (1)	Justin Baesman	TKO (punches)	Gladiator Challenge: Berry vs. Baesman	June 1, 2019	1	1:31	San Jacinto, California, United States	
Loss	15–15–1 (1)	Joe Schilling	Decision (unanimous)	Bellator 219	March 29, 2019	3	5:00	Temecula, California, United States	
Loss	15–14–1 (1)	Joseph Henle	Submission (rear-naked choke)	Golden Boy MMA: Liddell vs. Ortiz 3	November 24, 2018	1	1:12	Inglewood, California, United States	
Draw	15–13–1 (1)	Kevin Casey	Draw (majority)	Bellator 170	January 21, 2017	3	5:00	Inglewood, California, United States	
NC	15–13 (1)	Joe Pacheco	No Contest	Bellator 127	October 3, 2014	3	5:00	Temecula, California, United States	Originally a split decision win for Berry; overturned after failing a drug test.
Loss	15–13	Dave Vitkay	Decision (unanimous)	Bellator 116	April 11, 2014	3	5:00	Temecula, California, United States	
Loss	15–12	Eugene Fadiora	TKO (punches)	Bellator 105	October 25, 2013	2	4:19	Rio Rancho, New Mexico, United States	
Loss	15–11	Jeremy Kimball	KO (punches)	Bellator 97	July 31, 2013	2	1:45	Rio Rancho, New Mexico	Catchweight (190 lbs) bout.
Win	15–10	Cortez Coleman	Decision (split)	Bellator 96	June 19, 2013	3	5:00	Thackerville, Oklahoma	Catchweight (186.4 lbs) bout; Berry missed weight.
Win	14–10	Richard Rigmaden	Submission (kimura)	Bellator 92	March 7, 2013	1	1:31	Temecula, California	
Win	13–10	Edward Darby	TKO (punches)	Xplode Fight Series: Vengeance	January 19, 2013	1	1:02	Valley Center, California	
Win	12–10	Josh Gibson	TKO (punches)	Xplode Fight Series: Anarchy	September 22, 2012	1	1:05	Valley Center, California	Won the XFS Middleweight Championship.
Loss	11–10	Adlan Amagov	TKO (leg kick and punches)	Strikeforce: Rousey vs. Kaufman	August 18, 2012	1	0:48	San Diego, California	
Loss	11–9	Tyson Jeffries	Submission (rear-naked choke)	FCOC: Fight Club OC	April 14, 2012	1	4:10	Costa Mesa, California	
Win	11–8	Kenny Aires	DQ	Gladiator Challenge: Season's Beatings 3	December 4, 2011	1	N/A	San Jacinto, California	
Loss	10–8	Gian Villante	Decision (unanimous)	Strikeforce Challengers: Gurgel vs. Duarte	August 12, 2011	3	5:00	Las Vegas, Nevada, United States	Light Heavyweight bout.
Loss	10–7	Trevor Smith	Technical submission (north-south choke)	Strikeforce Challengers: Fodor vs. Terry	June 24, 2011	2	3:02	Kent, Washington, United States	Light Heavyweight bout.
Loss	10–6	Brett Cooper	KO (punches)	LOTC: Lords of the Cage	November 19, 2010	1	0:10	Temecula, California, United States	
Win	10–5	Brendan Ellison	TKO (punches)	Gladiator Challenge: Fahrenheit	August 20, 2010	1	0:46	San Jacinto, California	
Win	9–5	Sam Salas	KO (punch)	Gladiator Challenge: Bad Behavior	June 27, 2010	1	0:06	San Jacinto, California	
Win	8–5	Brian Campbell	TKO (submission to punches)	Gladiator Challenge: Vision Quest	February 21, 2010	1	0:14	San Jacinto, California, United States	
Win	7–5	Jeff Avants	TKO (punches)	Gladiator Challenge: Never Quit	November 8, 2009	1	0:25	San Jacinto, California, United States	
Loss	6–5	Doug Marshall	KO (punches)	PureCombat 10: Fearless	October 17, 2009	1	4:41	Tulare, California	
Loss	6–4	Tony Lopez	TKO (punches)	KOTC: Immortal	February 27, 2009	3	4:29	San Jacinto, California, United States	For the KOTC Light Heavyweight Championship.
Loss	6–3	Ray Lizama	TKO (punches to the body)	ShoXC: Hamman vs. Suganuma 2	August 15, 2008	2	2:15	Friant, California, United States	
Win	6–2	Umar Luv	TKO (submission to strikes)	KOTC: Final Chapter	December 2, 2007	2	4:50	San Jacinto, California, United States	Defended the KOTC Middleweight Championship.
Win	5–2	Sean Loeffler	Submission (triangle choke)	KOTC: Collision Course	August 5, 2007	1	2:05	San Jacinto, California, United States	Return to Middleweight. Won the vacant KOTC Middleweight Championship.
Win	4–2	Adrian Perez	KO (knee)	KOTC: Sinister	April 27, 2007	1	0:12	San Jacinto, California, United States	
Loss	3–2	Kawika Morton	Decision (split)	CCFC: Judgment Day	February 17, 2007	3	5:00	Santa Rosa, California, United States	
Loss	3–1	Terry Martin	TKO (punches)	WEC 24: Full Force	October 12, 2006	1	2:52	Lemoore, California, United States	
Win	3–0	Aiki Cavanaugh	KO (punch)	KOTC: Mangler	June 9, 2006	1	0:06	San Jacinto, California, United States	Light Heavyweight debut.
Win	2–0	Donny Rider	TKO (punches)	WEC 20: Cinco de Mayhem	May 5, 2006	1	0:36	Lemoore, California, United States	
Win	1–0	Johnny Vasquez	TKO (punches)	KOTC 63: Final Conflict	December 2, 2005	1	N/A	San Jacinto, California, United States	
