= 2007 in King of the Cage =

Information
- First date: January 19, 2007
- Last date: December 2, 2007

Events
- Total events: 24

Fights
- Total fights: 255
- Title fights: 14

Chronology
2006 in KOTC	2007 in King of the Cage	2008 in KOTC

The year 2007 is the ninth year in the history of King of the Cage, a mixed martial arts promotion based in the United States. In 2007 King of the Cage held 24 events, KOTC: Hard Knocks.

== Title fights ==
Title fights in 2007
Weight class				Method	Round	Time	Event	Notes
Lightweight	Clay French	def.	Mac Danzig (c)	Decision (Split)	3	5:00	KOTC: Hard Knocks	(Note: For the King of the Cage Lightweight Championship.)
Middleweight	Billy Ayash	def.	Joshua Taibl	Submission (Guillotine Choke)	1	N/A	KOTC: Mass Destruction	(Note: For The King of the Cage Middleweight Championship.)
Welterweight	Aaron Wetherspoon (c)	def.	Bryson Kamaka	TKO (Punches)	1	0:11	KOTC: Caged Chaos	(Note: For the King of the Cage Welterweight Championship.)
Heavyweight	Manny Rodriguez	def.	Jerry Davis	TKO (Punches)	1	3:41	KOTC: Caged Chaos	(Note: For the King of the Cage Heavyweight Championship.)
Flyweight	Ryan Diaz	def.	Ed Newalu	Submission (Armbar)	1	3:11	KOTC: Caged Chaos	(Note: For the King of the Cage Flyweight Championship.)
Welterweight	Aaron Wetherspoon (c)	def.	LaVerne Clark	Submission (Armbar)	1	3:10	KOTC: Sinister	(Note: For the King of the Cage Welterweight Championship.)
Lightweight	Clay French (c)	def.	Buddy Clinton	Decision (Split)	3	5:00	KOTC: Damage Control	(Note: For the King of the Cage Lightweight Championship.)
Light Heavyweight	James Lee (c)	def.	Aung La N Sang	Submission (Heel Hook)	1	3:51	KOTC: Explosion	(Note: For the King of the Cage Light Heavyweight Championship.)
Middleweight	Keith Berry	def.	Sean Loeffler	Submission (Triangle Choke)	1	2:05	KOTC: Collision Course	(Note: For The King of the Cage Middleweight Championship.)
Lightweight	Clay French (c)	def.	Buddy Clinton	TKO (Cut)	3	3:26	KOTC: Collision Course	(Note: For the King of the Cage Lightweight Championship.)
Lightweight	Clay French (c)	def.	Jason Ireland	Decision (Unanimous)	3	5:00	KOTC: Bad Boys	(Note: For the King of the Cage Lightweight Championship.)
Light Heavyweight	James Lee (c)	def.	Danny Bessant	Submission (Arm-Triangle Choke)	1	0:41	KOTC: Bad Boys	(Note: For the King of the Cage Light Heavyweight Championship.)
Middleweight	Keith Berry (c)	def.	Umar Luv	Submission (Strikes)	2	4:50	KOTC: Final Chapter	(Note: For The King of the Cage Middleweight Championship.)
Super Heavyweight	Brian Sesma	def.	Alan Zunner	TKO	1	1:18	KOTC: Final Chapter	(Note: For the King of the Cage Super Heavyweight Championship.)

== Events list ==
#	Event title	Date	Arena	Location
108	KOTC: Final Chapter	December 2, 2007	N/A	California
107	KOTC: Bad Boys	November 21, 2007	Soaring Eagle Casino	Mt. Pleasant, MI
106	KOTC: Damage Inc.	November 17, 2007	Rockford MetroCentre	Rockford, Illinois
105	KOTC: Arch Rivals	October 27, 2007	Reno Events Center	Reno, Nevada
104	KOTC: Hierarchy	October 13, 2007	Isleta Casino & Resort	Albuquerque, New Mexico
103	KOTC: Point of No Return	October 7, 2007	N/A	San Jacinto, California
102	KOTC: Brimstone	October 6, 2007	N/A	Wisconsin
101	KOTC: Perth	October 5, 2007	N/A	Perth, Australia
100	KOTC: Jawbreaker	September 29, 2007	N/A	Oklahoma
99	KOTC: Unstoppable	September 15, 2007	Apache Gold Casino	Globe, Arizona
98	KOTC: River Rage	September 15, 2007	N/A	Laughlin, Nevada
97	KOTC: Collision Course	August 5, 2007	Soboba Casino	San Jacinto, California
96	KOTC: Battle at the Bowl	July 21, 2007	Lake of the Torches	Lac du Flambeau, Wisconsin
95	KOTC: No Holds Barred	July 14, 2007	Eagle Mountain Casino	Porterville, California
94	KOTC: Explosion	June 15, 2007	Soaring Eagle Casino	Mt. Pleasant, MI
93	KOTC: Reincarnated	June 9, 2007	Auburn RSL	Auburn, Sydney, Australia
92	KOTC: Epicenter	June 8, 2007	Soboba Casino	San Jacinto, California
91	KOTC: Eliminator	June 2, 2007	Kiowa Casino	~ Oklahoma
90	KOTC: Damage Control	May 26, 2007	UIC Pavilion	Chicago
89	KOTC: Eclipse	May 26, 2007	Apache Gold Casino	Globe, Arizona
88	KOTC: Sinister	April 27, 2007	Soboba Casino	San Jacinto, California
87	KOTC: Caged Chaos	March 10, 2007	Avi Resort & Casino	Laughlin, Nevada
86	KOTC: Mass Destruction	January 26, 2007	Soaring Eagle Casino	Mount Pleasant, Michigan
85	KOTC: Hard Knocks	January 19, 2007	Rockford MetroCentre	Rockford, Illinois

== KOTC: Hard Knocks ==
KOTC: Hard Knocks was an event held on January 19, 2007 at The Rockford MetroCentre in Rockford, Illinois.

=== Results ===
Main Card
Weight class				Method	Round	Time	Notes
	Jeff Curran	def.	Donny Walker	Submission (Rear-Naked Choke)	3	3:23
Lightweight	Clay French	def.	Mac Danzig (c)	Decision (Split)	3	5:00	(Note: For the King of the Cage Lightweight Championship.)
	Justin Robbins	def.	Mustafa Hussaini	Decision (Unanimous)	3	5:00
	Adam Maciejewski	def.	Héctor Urbina	TKO (Punches)	1	2:50
	Chase Beebe	def.	Mikey Bennett	Submission (Rear-Naked Choke)	1	2:44
	Mike Marrello	def.	Brandon Griffin	Decision (Majority)	2	5:00
	Kevin Cooley	def.	Johnny Hughes	Submission (Armbar)	1	N/A
	Nate Mohr	def.	Cody Shipp	TKO (Punches)	1	2:59
	Jason Gilliam	def.	Alex Belosi	Submission (Rear-Naked Choke)	1	0:29

== KOTC: Mass Destruction ==
KOTC: Mass Destruction was an event held on January 26, 2007 at The Soaring Eagle Casino in Mount Pleasant, Michigan.

=== Results ===
Main Card
Weight class				Method	Round	Time	Notes
	Jason Ireland	def.	Jimmy Boyd	TKO (Punches)	1	N/A
	Dan Severn	def.	Wade Hamilton	Submission	1	N/A
	Anthony Lapsley	def.	John Mahlow	Submission (Triangle Choke)	1	N/A
	Jim Martens	def.	Aung La N Sang	Decision (Unanimous)	2	5:00
	Buddy Clinton	def.	Cory Garner	Submission (Kneebar)	1	N/A
	Joe Voisin	def.	Billy Kidd	TKO (Injury)	1	N/A
	Terry Davinney	def.	Daniel Sandmann	Submission (Rear-Naked Choke)	2	N/A
Middleweight	Billy Ayash	def.	Joshua Taibl	Submission (Guillotine Choke)	1	N/A	(Note: For The King of the Cage Middleweight Championship.)
	Nate Carey	def.	Rich Weeks	TKO (Punches)	1	N/A
	Stephen Jaskulski	def.	Brandon Hunt	KO (Punches)	1	N/A
	Myles Jury	def.	Scott Bickerstaff	TKO (Punches)	1	N/A

== KOTC: Caged Chaos ==
KOTC: Caged Chaos was an event held on March 10, 2007 at The Avi Resort & Casino in Laughlin, Nevada.

=== Results ===
Main Card
Weight class				Method	Round	Time	Notes
Welterweight	Aaron Wetherspoon (c)	def.	Bryson Kamaka	TKO (Punches)	1	0:11	(Note: For the King of the Cage Welterweight Championship.)
Heavyweight	Manny Rodriguez	def.	Jerry Davis	TKO (Punches)	1	3:41	(Note: For the King of the Cage Heavyweight Championship.)
Flyweight	Ryan Diaz	def.	Ed Newalu	Submission (Armbar)	1	3:11	(Note: For the King of the Cage Flyweight Championship.)
	Charles Bennett	def.	Robert Martz	KO (Punch)	1	0:29
	Toby Imada	def.	Randy Velarde	Submission (Armbar)	2	2:23
	Kyle Kingsbury	def.	Angelo McLeroy	Submission (Rear-Naked Choke)	1	1:39
	Sean Loeffler	def.	Dan Axe	Technical Submission (Rear-Naked Choke)	1	0:15
	Victor Valenzuela	def.	Albert Hill	Submission (Armbar)	1	1:01
	Thricia Poovey	def.	Tia Castillo	Submission (Triangle Choke)	1	3:17
	Lars Haven	def.	Sean McCafferty	Submission (Armbar)	1	0:51
	Frank Park	def.	John Cole	TKO (Punches)	1	1:30
	Ernie Calma	vs.	Gerry Noche	Draw	2	5:00
	Cody Bollinger	def.	Nick Trejo	Submission (Rear-Naked Choke)	2	3:12
	Calvin Bell	def.	Craig Turner	Submission (Heel Hook)	1	2:22
	Ty Gilstrap	def.	Edwin Diaz	TKO (Punches)	1	0:25

== KOTC: Sinister ==
KOTC: Sinister was an event held on April 27, 2007 at The Soboba Casino in San Jacinto, California.

=== Results ===
Main Card
Weight class				Method	Round	Time	Notes
	Napoleon Lechuga	def.	Allen Debillas	TKO	1	2:33
	Josh Rabedeaux	def.	Bakari McClain	Submission (Guillotine Choke)	1	2:12
	Fabian Diaz	def.	Steve Torres	Decision (Unanimous)	2	5:00
	Brandon Magana	def.	Jesse Vanderpool	TKO	1	2:18
	Chad Walter	def.	Andy Jewett	Submission (Rear Naked Choke)	2	2:41
	Melvin Costa	def.	Tim Alberty	KO	1	1:06
Welterweight	Aaron Wetherspoon (c)	def.	LaVerne Clark	Submission (Armbar)	1	3:10	(Note: For the King of the Cage Welterweight Championship.)
	Charlie Kohler	def.	Matt Dell	TKO	1	2:16
	Chase Gormley	def.	Jon Murphy	Decision (Unanimous)	2	5:00
	Josh Griggs	def.	Ben Fuimaono	Decision (Unanimous)	2	5:00
	Lucas Taber	def.	Calvin Bell	Submission (Heel Hook)	1	0:52
	Victor Valenzuela	def.	Scottie Ayres	Submission (Rear Naked Choke)	1	0:30
	Reggie Orr	def.	Dave Roberts	TKO	2	1:31
	Uber Gallegos	def.	Sean Loeffler	Decision (Majority)	2	5:00
	Shane Rice	def.	Matt Wilburn	Submission (Rear Naked Choke)	1	1:21
	Ben Beebe	def.	Duane Harrison	TKO	2	3:25
	Keith Berry	def.	Adrian Perez	KO (Knee)	1	0:12
	Cody Bollinger	def.	Kacey Roberts	Submission (Rear-Naked Choke)	1	1:20
	Joe Calavitta	def.	Ty Gilstrap	Submission (Rear Naked Choke)	1	2:15
	Andy Balmore	def.	Nicholas Gallegos	Submission (Rear Naked Choke)	1	3:07
	Alex Richard	def.	Aijalon Pace	Decision (Unanimous)	2	5:00

== KOTC: Eclipse ==
KOTC: Eclipse was an event held on May 26, 2007 at The Apache Gold Casino in Globe, Arizona.

=== Results ===
Main Card
Weight class				Method	Round	Time	Notes
	Adam Padilla	def.	Chance Williams	TKO (Corner Stoppage)	1	5:00
	Del Hawkins	def.	Albert Hill	KO	1	3:01
	Kyle Kingsbury	vs.	Maurice Jackson	No Contest	1	1:24
	Christian Grosinsky	def.	Buckley Acosta	Disqualification	2	4:28
	Paul O'Keefe	def.	Marvin Gaines	Submission (Punches)	1	2:15
	Levi Compton	def.	Lewis Compton	KO	2	0:19
	Leroy Fornof	def.	Lars Haven	Submission (Rear-Naked Choke)	1	2:47
	Robert Simmons	def.	Keith Dixon	Submission (Punches)	1	2:41
	Steve Keele	def.	Andrew Belvado	Submission (Punches)	2	0:38
	Jake Collins	def.	Sam Kozie	Submission (Rear-Naked Choke)	1	2:48
	Travis Hooke	def.	Kevin Fraze	KO	1	0:43
	Bryan Pardoe	def.	joe gauld	Submission (Choke)	1	1:09
	Andy Herrera	def.	Kevin Higginbotham	Submission (Rear-Naked Choke)	1	0:18

== KOTC: Damage Control ==
KOTC: Damage Control was an event held on May 26, 2007 at The UIC Pavilion in Chicago.

=== Results ===
Main Card
Weight class				Method	Round	Time	Notes
	Jeff Curran	def.	John Mahlow	Decision (Split)	3	5:00
Lightweight	Clay French (c)	def.	Buddy Clinton	Decision (Split)	3	5:00	(Note: For the King of the Cage Lightweight Championship.)
	Dereck Keasley	def.	Brian Gassaway	Decision (Unanimous)	2	5:00
	Héctor Urbina	def.	Adrian Serrano	KO (Punches)	1	1:18
	Carvin Mafatau	def.	Muhammed Abdul Rahim	TKO (Punches)	1	1:57
	Mike Marrello	def.	Ryan Antle	Decision (Unanimous)	2	5:00
	John Pierce	def.	Chris McDaniel	TKO (Punches)	1	3:07
	Billy Rutherford	def.	Brad Fonck	Decision (Unanimous)	2	5:00
	Josh Martin	def.	David Sarver	Submission (Guillotine Choke)	1	0:39
	Bobby Brents	def.	Jeremy Genin	TKO (Punches)	1	1:31
	Kris Tackett	def.	Kevin King	TKO (Punches)	1	1:17
	Josh Phillips	def.	Malik Allah	TKO (Punches)	1	2:38
	Karl Turek	def.	Kevin Knop	TKO (Punches)	1	0:46

== KOTC: Eliminator ==
KOTC: Eliminator was an event held on June 2, 2007 at The Kiowa Casino in Oklahoma.

=== Results ===
Main Card
Weight class				Method	Round	Time	Notes
	Geno Roderick	def.	Preston Campbell	TKO (Punches)	1	0:40
	Darrell Rittman	def.	William Matthew Green	TKO (Punches)	1	4:02
	Matt Jaggers	def.	Casey Ulrich	TKO (Punches)	1	2:21
	Johnny Flores	def.	Nate Murdock	Submission (Triangle Choke)	2	4:54
	Levi Avera	def.	Matt Warner	Submission (Anaconda Choke)	1	1:02

== KOTC: Epicenter ==
KOTC: Epicenter was an event held on June 8, 2007 at The Soboba Casino in San Jacinto, California.

=== Results ===
Main Card
Weight class				Method	Round	Time	Notes
	John Brock	def.	Jim Collins	Submission (Triangle Choke)	1	4:16
	Angelo McLeroy	def.	Aiki Cavanaugh	KO (Kick)	1	3:33
	Victor Rodarte	def.	Donald Molinas	Submission (Rear-Naked Choke)	1	0:47
	Kyle McClaughlin	def.	Dan Gibbon	Decision (Unanimous)	2	5:00
	Thomas Kenney	def.	Jay Diamond	Submission (Kimura)	1	0:59
	Thomas Denny	def.	Don Shea	KO (Punches)	1	1:12
	Cody Bollinger	def.	Chad Walter	Submission (Rear-Naked Choke)	2	3:10
	Dave Cryer	def.	Uber Gallegos	Submission (Rear-Naked Choke)	2	1:41
	Crystal Harris	def.	Thricia Poovey	TKO (Corner Stoppage)	1	5:00
	Sean Loeffler	def.	Rubin Taigle	Submission (Keylock)	1	0:22
	Anthony Mendez	def.	Duane Harrison	TKO (Punches)	1	1:02
	Tim Humphry	def.	PJ Rogowoski	TKO (Punches)	1	1:47
	Melvin Costa	def.	Robert Doucet	TKO (Punches)	1	2:01
	Andy Jewett	def.	Kacey Roberts	TKO (Punches)	1	3:31
	Nick Avarado	def.	Matt Wilburn	Decision (Unanimous)	2	5:00
	Gunnar Hinson	def.	Chris Culley	Submission (Heel Hook)	1	4:24
	Georgi Karakhanyan	vs.	Juan Carlos Huerta	Draw	2	5:00
	Travis Havens	def.	Eric Hakala	Submission (Rear-Naked Choke)	1	0:40

== KOTC: Reincarnated ==
KOTC: Reincarnated was an event held on June 9, 2007 at Auburn RSL in Auburn, Sydney, Australia.

=== Results ===
Main Card
Weight class				Method	Round	Time	Notes
	Mahmoud Sabra	def.	Kahn Buchanan	KO (Punches)	1	0:22
	Felise Leniu	def.	Hiriwa Te Rangi	KO (Punches)	2	0:00
	Kian Pham	def.	Sam Sam	Submission (Slam)	1	0:33

== KOTC: Explosion ==
KOTC: Explosion was an event held on June 15, 2007 at The Soaring Eagle Casino in Mt. Pleasant, MI.

=== Results ===
Main Card
Weight class				Method	Round	Time	Notes
	Jason Ireland	def.	Mike O'Donnell	KO (Punches)	2	0:26
Light Heavyweight	James Lee (c)	def.	Aung La N Sang	Submission (Heel Hook)	1	3:51	(Note: For the King of the Cage Light Heavyweight Championship.)
	John Burt	def.	Victor Torres	TKO (Punches)	1	4:07
	Joshua Taibl	def.	Geno Roderick	KO (Punches)	1	1:36
	Tom Logsdon	def.	Joe Voisin	Disqualification	1	N/A
	Bryan Harper	def.	Jim Martens	Decision (Unanimous)	2	5:00
	Luke Zachrich	def.	Brad Burrick	Submission (Armbar)	1	1:51
	Myles Jury	def.	Paul Robert Martin	KO (Punch)	1	0:31

== KOTC: No Holds Barred ==
KOTC: No Holds Barred was an event held on July 14, 2007 at The Eagle Mountain Casino in Porterville, California.

=== Results ===
Main Card
Weight class				Method	Round	Time	Notes
	James Fanshier	def.	Ronald Jhun	Submission (Armbar)	3	0:43
	Anthony Vera	def.	William Johnson	TKO (Punches)	1	1:23
	Dusty Arden	def.	Bryson Kamaka	TKO (Punches)	1	1:37
	Chino Esparza	def.	Casey Ray	Decision (Majority)	2	5:00
	Darvin Wattree	def.	Jeremy Ybara	Submission (Guillotine Choke)	1	2:56
	Rolando Torres	def.	Tommy Contreras	TKO (Punches)	1	4:33
	Marc De La Cruz	def.	Jose Torres	Decision (Unanimous)	2	5:00
	Doug Hunt	def.	Francisco Romero	Submission (Rear-Naked Choke)	1	3:57
	Lewis Steele	def.	Billy Terry	Submission (Rear-Naked Choke)	1	4:12
	Jason Drake	def.	Eric Olsen	TKO (Punches)	1	0:19
	Travis Davenport	def.	Barnie Garfield	Decision (Unanimous)	2	5:00
	Stan Dressler	def.	Ronnie Kruger	Submission (Guillotine Choke)	1	1:32
	Demetriah Johnson	def.	Pedro Mercado	TKO (Punches)	1	1:25

== KOTC: Battle at the Bowl ==
KOTC: Battle at the Bowl was an event held on July 21, 2007 at The Lake of the Torches in Lac du Flambeau, Wisconsin.

=== Results ===
Main Card
Weight class				Method	Round	Time	Notes
	Charles Bennett	def.	Dan Loman	KO (Punches)	2	3:15
	Kyle Kingsbury	def.	Demian Decorah	Decision (Unanimous)	2	5:00
	Matt Jaggers	def.	Mohammed Rashad	TKO (Punches)	1	1:48
	Geno Roderick	def.	Paul Gamboa	TKO (Punches)	1	1:20

== KOTC: Collision Course ==
KOTC: Collision Course was an event held on August 5, 2007 at The Soboba Casino in San Jacinto, California.

=== Results ===
Main Card
Weight class				Method	Round	Time	Notes
	Jeremy Bennett	def.	Rubin Taigle	Submission (Arm-Triangle Choke)	1	0:34
	Josh Lewis	def.	Tim Alberty	Submission (Rear-Naked Choke)	1	1:24
	John Brock	def.	Edgar Cruz	Submission (Triangle Choke)	1	2:38
	Pete Sabala	def.	Kyle McClaughlin	TKO (Punches)	1	3:46
Middleweight	Keith Berry	def.	Sean Loeffler	Submission (Triangle Choke)	1	2:05	(Note: For The King of the Cage Middleweight Championship.)
	Thomas Denny	def.	John Cole	Submission (Rear-Naked Choke)	1	3:58
Lightweight	Clay French (c)	def.	Buddy Clinton	TKO (Cut)	3	3:26	(Note: For the King of the Cage Lightweight Championship.)
	Bryan Baker	def.	Reggie Orr	TKO (Punches)	1	2:53
	Dave Rivas	vs.	Shad Smith	Draw	2	5:00
	Junior Kling	def.	Cody Bollinger	Decision (Unanimous)	2	5:00
	Ernie Perea	def.	Jesse Beede	TKO (Punches)	1	0:51
	William Sriyapai	def.	Soky Aguilar	TKO (Punches)	1	2:21
	Dave Cryer	def.	Chon Stinson	KO (Punch)	1	0:41
	Travis Havens	def.	Tim Humphry	Submission (Rear-Naked Choke)	1	0:29
	Melvin Costa	def.	Sean McCafferty	KO (Knee)	2	0:39
	Tony Cruz	def.	Josh Miller	Submission (Rear-Naked Choke)	1	4:06
	Isaac Newman-Gomez	def.	Sal Farnetti	TKO (Punches)	1	2:08

== KOTC: River Rage ==
KOTC: River Rage was an event held on September 15, 2007 in Laughlin, Nevada.

=== Results ===
Main Card
Weight class				Method	Round	Time	Notes
	Reggie Orr	def.	Ricky Gunz	Submission (Rear-Naked Choke)	1	0:23
	Tony Lopez	def.	Kyle Kingsbury	TKO (Punches)	1	1:36
	Dave Cryer	def.	Richard Wade	KO (Punches)	1	1:14
	Frank Appah	def.	Joseph Squires	Submission (Anaconda Choke)	1	0:39
	Ernie Calma	def.	Kacey Roberts	TKO (Punches)	1	1:25
	Lars Haven	def.	Levi LaLonde	Disqualification	1	1:58
	Joe Condon	def.	Jae Douglas	N/A	1	N/A
	Anthony Guerra	def.	Jeff Eston	TKO (Punches)	1	N/A
	Joshua Groves	def.	Matt Harvey	TKO (Punches)	1	0:45
	Andy Balmore	def.	Chris Culley	Decision (Split)	2	5:00

== KOTC: Unstoppable ==
KOTC: Unstoppable was an event held on September 15, 2007 at The Apache Gold Casino in Globe, Arizona.

=== Results ===
Main Card
Weight class				Method	Round	Time	Notes
	Ryan Bader	def.	Dicky Chavez	TKO (Punches)	1	0:41
	Chance Williams	def.	Adam Padilla	Submission (Guillotine Choke)	1	0:14
	Jesse Ortiz	def.	Levi Compton	Submission (Guillotine Choke)	1	1:32
	Shawn David	def.	Victor Hernandez	TKO (Punches)	1	0:22

== KOTC: Jawbreaker ==
KOTC: Jawbreaker was an event held on September 29, 2007 in Oklahoma.

=== Results ===
Main Card
Weight class				Method	Round	Time	Notes
	Jason Maxwell	def.	Christian Sanchez	Submission (Kimura)	1	0:46
	Bubba McDaniel	def.	Blake Norsworthy	TKO	1	2:43
	Mike Budnik	def.	Johnny Flores	Decision (Split)	2	0:00

== KOTC: Perth ==
KOTC: Perth was an event held on October 5, 2007 in Perth, Australia.

=== Results ===
Main Card
Weight class				Method	Round	Time	Notes
	Denis Kelly	def.	Chris Hoy	Submission (Guillotine Choke)	1	N/A
	Connell Sinclair	def.	Garth Cheddington	TKO (Punches)	1	N/A
	Peter Griffith	def.	Phil Lai	TKO (Punches)	1	N/A
	Soa Palelei	def.	Shaun Vanof	KO (Punch)	1	0:05
	Brian Ebersole	def.	Gordon Graff	Decision (Unanimous)	2	5:00

== KOTC: Brimstone ==
KOTC: Brimstone was an event held on October 6, 2007 in Wisconsin.

=== Results ===
Main Card
Weight class				Method	Round	Time	Notes
	Antoine Skinner	def.	Sheldon Sproessig	TKO	1	0:00
	Matt Jaggers	def.	Hussein Rashad	KO	1	0:00
	Billy Kidd	def.	Muhammed El Umari	TKO	1	0:00
	Tim Bradley	def.	Mike Sandez	Submission (Guillotine Choke)	1	0:00

== KOTC: Point of No Return ==
KOTC: Point of No Return was an event held on October 7, 2007 in San Jacinto, California.

=== Results ===
Main Card
Weight class				Method	Round	Time	Notes
	Geno Salomone	def.	Fabian Diaz	Submission (Armbar)	1	2:04
	Andy Jewett	def.	Edgar Irizarry	TKO (Punches)	1	3:43
	Travis Havens	def.	Daniel Nova	KO (Punch)	1	1:12
	Jeremy Bennett	def.	Ricky Gunz	TKO (Punches)	1	0:29
	William Sriyapai	def.	Chai Sitisute	Decision (Unanimous)	2	5:00
	Melvin Costa	def.	Angelo McLeroy	TKO (Punches)	2	2:12
	Roch Worthy	def.	Dave Cryer	KO (Punch)	1	0:09
	John Lober	def.	Damien Gomez	TKO (Punches)	1	3:20
	Paul Arras	def.	Greg Leinan	TKO (Punches)	1	0:19
	Frank Park	def.	Rick Jones	KO (Punches)	1	2:41
	Gunnar Hinson	def.	Greg Guzman	Submission (Armbar)	1	4:16
	Ricky Legere Jr.	def.	Robert Doucet	TKO (Punches)	1	0:46
	Jesus Morales	def.	Alex Richard	TKO (Punches)	1	3:04
	Frank Guerrero	def.	Matt Buckley	Decision (Split)	2	5:00
	Sal Farnetti	def.	Anthony Mendez	TKO (Punches)	1	4:26
	Tim Humphry	def.	Rob Rosales	TKO (Punches)	1	0:37
	Isaac Newman-Gomez	def.	Jason Windeh	KO (Kick)	1	0:49

== KOTC: Hierarchy ==
KOTC: Hierarchy was an event held on October 13, 2007 at The Isleta Casino & Resort in Albuquerque, New Mexico.

=== Results ===
Main Card
Weight class				Method	Round	Time	Notes
	Charles Bennett	def.	Donnie Martinez	Submission (Guillotine Choke)	1	1:39
	Tony Bonello	def.	Tony Lopez	Decision (Unanimous)	2	5:00
	Vito Woods	def.	Donald Sanchez	Decision (Unanimous)	2	5:00
	Abel Cullum	def.	Eddie Armendariz	KO (Punch)	1	1:17
	Brandon Hunt	def.	Ronnie Huizar	TKO (Punches)	2	1:26
	Isaac Vallie-Flagg	def.	Abel Vargas	Submission (Rear-Naked Choke)	1	2:01
	Joshua Groves	def.	Freddy Sandoval	Submission (Punches)	1	1:52
	Angelo Sanchez	def.	David Valverde	Submission (Rear-Naked Choke)	1	1:45
	Quinn Mulhern	def.	Doug Brown	Submission (Armbar)	1	1:42
	Joe Coca	def.	Randy Turpin	TKO (Punches and Elbows)	1	1:51
	Billy Dozier	def.	Kevin Folse	Submission (Guillotine Choke)	1	1:05

== KOTC: Arch Rivals ==
KOTC: Arch Rivals was an event held on October 27, 2007 at The Reno Events Center in Reno, Nevada.

=== Results ===
Main Card
Weight class				Method	Round	Time	Notes
	Anthony Lapsley	def.	Jaime Jara	No Decision - Overturned by NSAC	2	1:17
	Bao Quach	def.	Chris David	Decision (Unanimous)	3	5:00
	Tony Lopez	def.	Frank Appah	TKO (Punches)	1	3:10
	Dan Molina	def.	Bubba McDaniel	Submission (Heel Hook)	1	2:05
	Brad Imes	def.	Bo Cantrell	Submission (Gogoplata)	1	0:55
	Shannone Callos	def.	Hunter Worsham	Submission (Triangle Choke)	1	2:20
	Jack Montgomery	def.	Adam Torres	Submission (Rear-Naked Choke)	2	4:46
	Aaron Buck	def.	Tim Bradley	Submission (Armbar)	1	2:27

== KOTC: Damage Inc. ==
KOTC: Damage Inc. was an event held on November 17, 2007 at The Rockford MetroCentre in Rockford, Illinois.

=== Results ===
Main Card
Weight class				Method	Round	Time	Notes
	Steve Campbell	def.	Jason Cable	Decision (Unanimous)	3	3:00
	Rodney Sleepers	def.	Kenny Martin	Decision (Unanimous)	3	3:00
	Rob Menigoz	def.	Zach Jenkins	KO (Punches)	1	2:49
	Héctor Urbina	def.	Joe Kennedy	KO (Punches)	1	2:24
	Tony Bonello	vs.	Ryan Sturdy	Draw	2	5:00
	Billy Kidd	def.	Myron Neisler	TKO (Punches)	2	1:27
	Bryce Franck	def.	Troy King	TKO (Retirement)	2	3:00
	Lazar Stojadinovic	def.	Matt Jaggers	Technical Submission (Triangle Choke)	1	2:53
	Natu Visnia	def.	Jeremy Genin	TKO (Punches)	1	0:36
	Darius Turcinskas	def.	Antonio Canas	Submission (Armbar)	1	1:21
	Andy Hahn	def.	Sam Jackson	TKO (Punches)	2	1:55
	Adam Bass	def.	Anthony Gott	TKO (Punches and Knees)	1	0:24

== KOTC: Bad Boys ==
KOTC: Bad Boys was an event held on November 21, 2007 at The Soaring Eagle Casino in Mt. Pleasant, MI.

=== Results ===
Main Card
Weight class				Method	Round	Time	Notes
Lightweight	Clay French (c)	def.	Jason Ireland	Decision (Unanimous)	3	5:00	(Note: For the King of the Cage Lightweight Championship.)
Light Heavyweight	James Lee (c)	def.	Danny Bessant	Submission (Arm-Triangle Choke)	1	0:41	(Note: For the King of the Cage Light Heavyweight Championship.)
	Dan Severn	def.	Don Richards	Decision (Unanimous)	3	5:00
	Nate Carey	def.	Terry Davinney	Submission (Rear-Naked Choke)	1	2:39
	Victor Torres	def.	Joshua Taibl	Submission (Verbal)	1	2:03
	Brad Burrick	def.	Bobby Martinez	Decision (Unanimous)	2	5:00
	Josh Lawrence	def.	Justin Crosby	Submission (Guillotine Choke)	1	4:21
	Myles Jury	def.	Joel Roberts	KO (Punches)	1	1:35

== KOTC: Final Chapter ==
KOTC: Final Chapter was an event held on December 2, 2007 in California.

=== Results ===
Main Card
Weight class				Method	Round	Time	Notes
	Nick Alvarado	def.	Victor Salcedo	Decision (Unanimous)	2	5:00
	Fabian Diaz	def.	Dan Gibbon	Decision (Unanimous)	2	5:00
	William Richey	def.	Adam Woods	Submission (Rear Naked Choke)	1	1:10
	Dominic Verdugo	def.	Dan Pribble	Submission (Guillotine Choke)	1	0:33
	Brandon Bender	def.	Hugo Sandoval	Submission (Triangle Choke)	1	1:37
	Neil Cooke	def.	Mike Sims	TKO	1	0:15
	Andy Balmore	def.	Miguel Esparza	Decision (Majority)	2	5:00
	John Brock	def.	Tyrone Crane	TKO	1	1:10
	Dave Cryer	def.	Noufel Amellouk	Decision (Unanimous)	2	5:00
	Rubin Taigle	def.	John Lober	KO	1	0:10
Middleweight	Keith Berry (c)	def.	Umar Luv	Submission (Strikes)	2	4:50	(Note: For The King of the Cage Middleweight Championship.)
Super Heavyweight	Brian Sesma	def.	Alan Zunner	TKO	1	1:18	(Note: For the King of the Cage Super Heavyweight Championship.)
	Paul Arras	def.	Brian Warren	TKO	1	3:53
	Tony Cruz	def.	Tim Humphry	Submission (Armbar)	2	0:50
	Reggie Orr	def.	Illiums Goglia	Decision (Unanimous)	2	5:00
	Ricky Legere Jr.	def.	Napoleon Lechuga	Submission (Armbar)	1	3:31
	Greg Guzman	def.	Anthony Guerra	Submission (Armbar)	1	0:55
	Jesus Morales	def.	Aijalon Pace	KO	1	0:19
	Chris Culley	def.	Kacey Roberts	Submission (Rear Naked Choke)	1	1:17
	Jason Jones	def.	Melvin Costa	Submission (Armbar)	1	4:18
	David Aguirre	vs.	Reuben Duran	Draw	2	5:00
	Patrick Doty	def.	Sean McCafferty	KO	2	0:23
	Tom Peralta	def.	Paul Webb	Decision (Unanimous)	2	5:00

== See also ==
- List of King of the Cage events
- List of King of the Cage champions
