= David Irving (American football) =

American football player (born 1993)

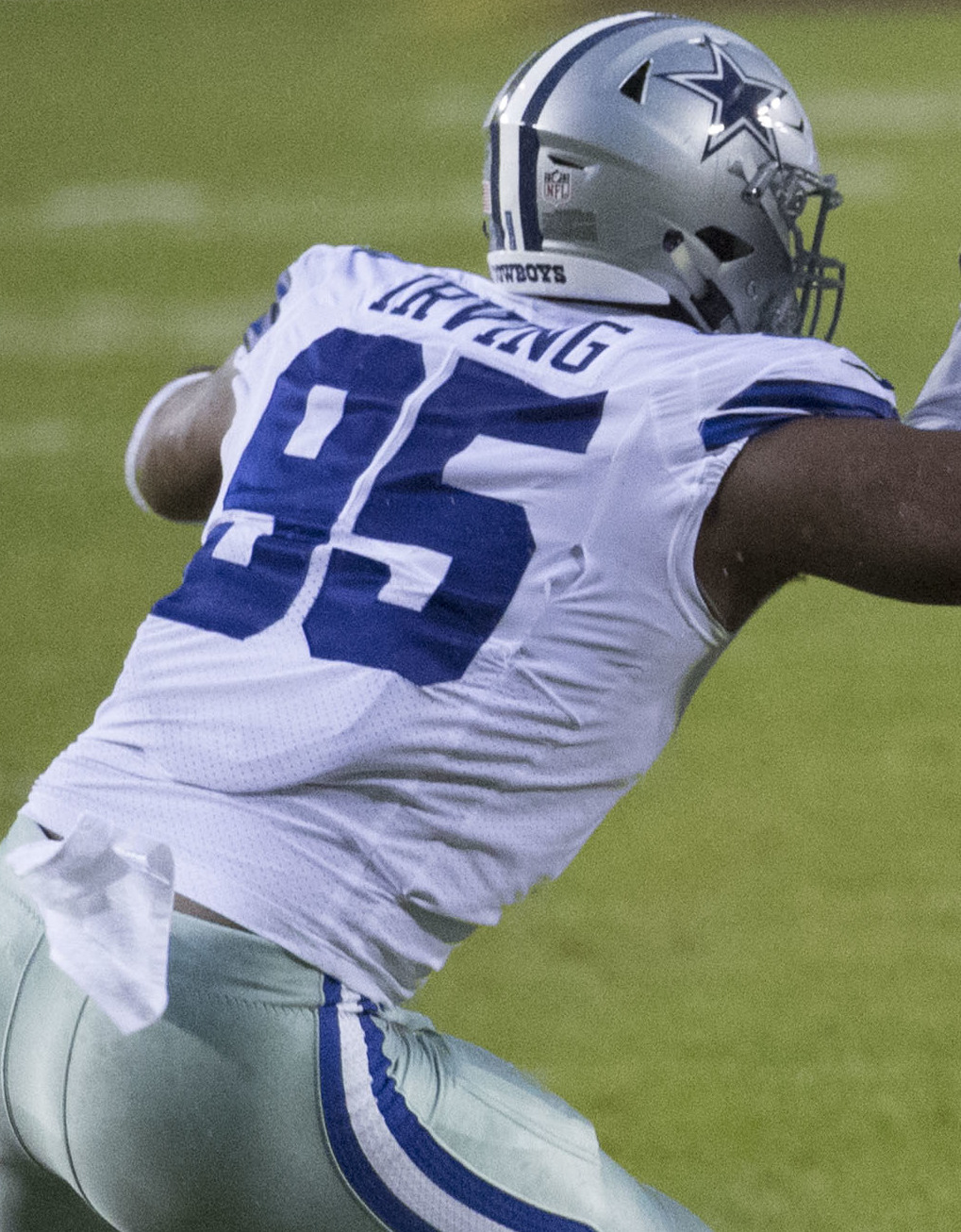
- Irving with the Dallas Cowboys in 2017

No. 95
- Position: Defensive tackle

Personal information
- Born: August 18, 1993 (age 33); Compton, California, U.S.
- Listed height: 6 ft 7 in (2.01 m)
- Listed weight: 290 lb (132 kg)

Career information
- High school: San Jacinto (San Jacinto, California)
- College: Iowa State (2011–2013)
- NFL draft: 2015: undrafted

Career history
- Kansas City Chiefs (2015)*; Dallas Cowboys (2015–2018); Las Vegas Raiders (2020)
- * Offseason or practice squad member only

Career NFL statistics
- Total tackles: 60
- Sacks: 12.5
- Pass deflections: 12
- Forced fumbles: 5
- Fumble recoveries: 1
- Stats at Pro Football Reference

David Ja Rodd Irving (born August 18, 1993) is an American former professional football player who was a defensive tackle in the National Football League (NFL). He played college football for the Iowa State Cyclones, and was a member of the NFL's Dallas Cowboys, Kansas City Chiefs and Las Vegas Raiders.

== Early life ==
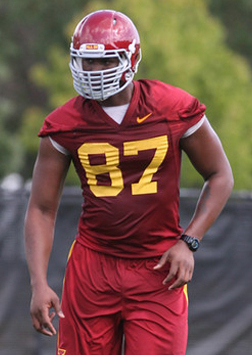
Irving with Iowa State in 2013

Irving grew up in Compton, California, but moved to San Jacinto, California, as a youth and attended San Jacinto High School, where he played defensive tackle and tight end as a senior, recording 76 tackles (15 for loss), 7 sacks, 5 forced fumbles, 4 fumble recoveries, 19 receptions for 298 yards and 4 touchdowns.

== College career ==
He accepted a scholarship from Iowa State University. He became a starter after switching from defensive end to defensive tackle as a junior, while posting 8 starts, 19 tackles (4.5 for loss) and 2 sacks. He missed the entire 2014 season after being dismissed from the team following an incident at the VEISHEA festival. He finished his college career with 32 games (8 starts), 44 tackles (7.5 for loss), 3 sacks, one forced fumble, one interception returned for a touchdown, 8 passes defensed and 3 blocked kicks.

== Professional career ==
=== Kansas City Chiefs ===
Irving was signed as an undrafted free agent by the Kansas City Chiefs after the 2015 NFL draft. He was waived on September 5 and signed to the practice squad.

=== Dallas Cowboys ===
==== 2015 season ====
On September 29, 2015, he was signed by the Dallas Cowboys from the Chiefs practice squad, to replace a released Davon Coleman. He was used as a backup defensive tackle and had 14 quarterback pressures (sixth on the team) in limited opportunities.

He blocked a field goal in the seventh game of the season against the Seattle Seahawks. He suffered a left wrist fracture in the fifteenth game against the Buffalo Bills and was placed on the injured reserve list on December 30.

==== 2016 season ====
On October 16, 2016, in a 30–16 win against the Green Bay Packers Irving was named NFC Defensive Player of the Week, when he forced three fumbles, recovering one, had a sack, and batted down a pass. Irving played only 19 snaps in the game.

He was ejected from a game against the Cleveland Browns on November 6.

In the fourth quarter of the week 15 game against the Tampa Bay Buccaneers, Irving had two tackles, one and a half sacks, 2 of his 5 quarterback pressures, a pass defended and a play where he hit quarterback Jameis Winston's arm just as he was releasing a pass that ended up being intercepted. Irving's play also led to Tampa Bay personnel and coverage changes that created opportunities for other Cowboys players, including rookie defensive tackle Maliek Collins sacking Winston with one minute left to play, which set up a game-sealing interception by cornerback Orlando Scandrick.

In the 2017 Divisional playoff game against the Green Bay Packers, Irving claims that in the final snap of the game the officials missed a holding call committed by guard T. J. Lang against him. During that play, Aaron Rodgers made a completion to Jared Cook with Cook's maintaining his feet a few inches inbounds from the sidelines. That completion set up a 51-yard Mason Crosby field goal to win the game with only three seconds on the clock.

==== 2017 season ====
On March 6, 2017, Irving re-signed with the Cowboys. On May 23, it was announced that Irving would be suspended four games due to violating the league's performance enhancing drugs policy. He dropped his appeal and was officially suspended the first four games of the 2017 season. After joining the team, he was moved from defensive end to the three-technique defensive tackle position. He suffered a concussion in the twelfth game against the Washington Redskins, which was complicated by the fact that he kept playing through it. The lingering symptoms he experienced afterwards forced the team to declare him inactive for the rest of the season.

Despite missing the first four games because of his suspension, and the final four because of a concussion, Irving still accrued seven sacks (second on the team), 19 quarterback pressures, 12 tackles (3 for loss), 6 passes defensed and one forced fumble. At the time of his concussion in Week 13, Irving was leading all defensive tackles in the NFL in sacks.

==== 2018 season ====
On March 14, 2018, the Cowboys placed a second-round restricted free agent tender on Irving. On June 15, it was announced that due to violating the NFL's Policy and Program for Substances of Abuse, Irving would again be suspended for the first four games of the regular season. The Cowboys placed Irving on the reserve/did not report list on July 25 to start training camp, as he dealt with his off-field issues. He was added to the active roster on October 6 after serving his four-game suspension. Irving played in two regular season games, both in October, registering four tackles and one sack. He suffered a high ankle sprain during practice on November 1, and did not play again.

On March 1, 2019, Irving was indefinitely suspended by the NFL for again violating the league's policy on substances of abuse. A few days later, he announced that he was quitting football because he was opposed to the NFL's drug policy, specifically with regards to marijuana. He was conditionally reinstated by the NFL on October 16, 2020, and he worked out for the Las Vegas Raiders the next day.

=== Las Vegas Raiders ===
On October 20, 2020, Irving was signed to the Las Vegas Raiders practice squad. He was elevated to the active roster on October 24 and November 14 for the team's weeks 7 and 10 games against the Tampa Bay Buccaneers and Denver Broncos, and reverted to the practice squad after each game. He was placed on the practice squad/COVID-19 list by the team on November 18, and restored to the practice squad three days later. He was elevated to the active roster again on November 21 for the week 11 game against the Kansas City Chiefs, and reverted to the practice squad again following the game. He was placed back on the practice squad/COVID-19 list on December 22, 2020, and restored to the practice squad again on December 29. His practice squad contract with the team expired after the season on January 11, 2021. On February 18, 2021, Irving re-signed with the Raiders. He was released on May 21, 2021.

=== Statistics ===
Year	Team	GP	GS	Comb	Solo	Asst	Sack	FF	FR	Yds	INT	Yds	Avg	Long	TD	PD
2015	DAL	12	0	13	8	8	0.5	0	0	0	0	0	0	0	0	1
2016	DAL	15	2	17	12	5	4.0	4	1	0	0	0	0	0	0	5
2017	DAL	8	8	22	13	9	7.0	1	0	0	0	0	0	0	0	6
2018	DAL	2	0	4	3	1	1.0	0	0	0	0	0	0	0	0	0
Career		37	10	56	36	20	12.5	5	1	0	0	0	0	0	0	12

== Personal life ==
Following his indefinite suspension from the NFL in March 2019, Irving became an activist for cannabis. He co-founded his own cannabis advocacy magazine called Cannabis Passport with John Scannell who originally invented the Worlds First Rolling paper magazine.
