= Kyle Kingsbury =

American mixed martial arts fighter (born 1982)

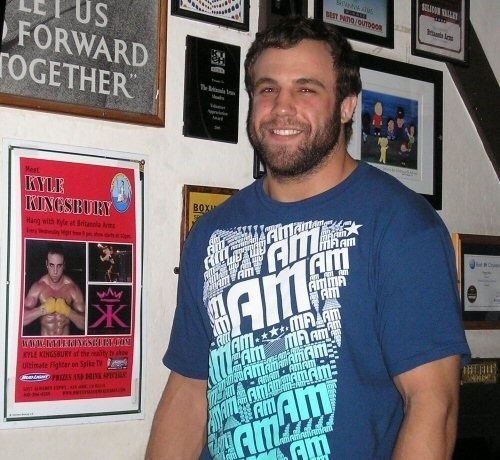
- Born: Kyle Loren Kingsbury; March 22, 1982 (age 44); San Jose, California, U.S.
- Other names: Kingsbu
- Height: 6 ft 4 in (1.93 m)
- Weight: 205 lb (93 kg; 14.6 st)
- Division: Light Heavyweight (205 lb)
- Reach: 76 in (193 cm)
- Fighting out of: San Jose, California, U.S.
- Team: American Kickboxing Academy
- Rank: black belt in brazilian jiu-jitsu
- Years active: 2006–2014

Mixed martial arts record
- Total: 18
- Wins: 11
- By knockout: 4
- By submission: 2
- By decision: 5
- Losses: 6
- By knockout: 2
- By submission: 1
- By decision: 3
- No contests: 1

Other information
- Mixed martial arts record from Sherdog

Kyle Loren Kingsbury (born March 22, 1982) is an American retired professional mixed martial artist. A competitor from 2006 until 2014, Kingsbury also formerly competed for King of the Cage and was a cast member of Spike TV's The Ultimate Fighter: Team Nogueira vs. Team Mir.

== Background ==
Kingsbury attended Monta Vista High School in Cupertino, California. Kingsbury played high school football for the school, playing the defensive tackle position. He earned many titles such as: "Defensive Lineman of the Year" in the Santa Clara Valley League (2000), two-time first-team all-league selection (1999 and 2000), also earned second-team All-Central Coast Section honors behind first-team selection Jared Allen his senior year. Kingsbury was selected by the North squad for the North vs. South San Jose Charlie Wedemeyer All-Star football game, after a senior season where he racked up 53 tackles, 10 sacks and two fumble recoveries in his final year. Kyle was the captain for both his football team and his wrestling team. After graduating in 2000, Kyle attended Mesa Community College and earned his associate degree in 2003.

== Football career ==
Kingsbury later transferred to Arizona State University (ASU). He was a walk-on for the football team where he was a scout team member in the 2003 season and saw playing time in the 2004 season, including in ASU's 2004 Sun Bowl victory over Purdue University.

== Mixed martial arts ==
=== The Ultimate Fighter ===
Kingsbury fought Ryan Bader for a spot on the show, he lost to Bader by arm-triangle choke in the second round. After the discovery of two injured fighters, Kingsbury was brought in to replace one of them. He was picked by Antonio Nogueira's team and Nogueira called Kingsbury the leader of the team. In the first round of fights, Krzysztof Soszynski defeated Kingsbury. In the finale Kingsbury was matched up against Tom Lawlor. Kingsbury lost a unanimous decision to Lawlor at the Ultimate Fighter Finale.

=== Ultimate Fighting Championship ===
Kingsbury made his UFC debut against former The Ultimate Fighter: Team Nogueira vs. Team Mir castmate Tom Lawlor. He was defeated via unanimous decision on the preliminary card at The Ultimate Fighter 8 Finale. Even though Kingsbury did not win any fights on TUF and did not win his debut, the UFC decided to keep him signed.

At UFC 104, Kyle fought in his second UFC bout against Razak Al-Hassan. The fight went to the judges and was scored in the favor of Kyle who took a split decision.

Kingsbury defeated Jared Hamman via unanimous decision on September 15, 2010 at UFC Fight Night 22 in a bout that earned Fight of the Night honors.

Kingsbury improved his UFC record to 3-1 after a TKO victory over Ricardo Romero in 0:21 seconds of the first round, on February 5, 2011 at UFC 126.

Kingsbury faced Fábio Maldonado on June 4, 2011 at The Ultimate Fighter 13 Finale. He won the fight via unanimous decision and also earned the Fight of the Night honors for his performance.

Kingsbury next faced Stephan Bonnar on November 19, 2011 at UFC 139. He lost the fight via unanimous decision.

Kingsbury fought UFC newcomer, Glover Teixeira on May 26, 2012 at UFC 146. Kingsbury lost the fight via submission in the first round.

Kingsbury lost to debuting Jimi Manuwa on September 29, 2012 at UFC on Fuel TV 5 by TKO due to doctor stoppage. Kingsbury took tremendous punishment in the fight before the doctor ended the bout due to his left eye swelling shut. Kingsbury revealed on The MMA Hour that his orbital bone was fractured in two places but that it did not require surgery.

Kingsbury faced Patrick Cummins on July 26, 2014 at UFC on Fox 12. He lost the fight via unanimous decision (30–27, 30–25, and 30–24) and subsequently announced his retirement from MMA.

== Acting ==
Kingsbury performed motion capture for Vietnam veteran turned criminal, Lincoln Clay, in Mafia III.

== Championships and accomplishments ==
- Ultimate Fighting Championship
  - Fight of the Night (Two times) vs. Jared Hamman and Fábio Maldonado
  - UFC.com Awards
    - 2011: Ranked #9 Fight of the Year vs. Fabio Maldonado

== Mixed martial arts record ==
Professional record breakdown
18 matches	11 wins	6 losses
By knockout	4	2
By submission	2	1
By decision	5	3
No contests	1	

Res.	Record	Opponent	Method	Event	Date	Round	Time	Location	Notes
Loss	11–6 (1)	Patrick Cummins	Decision (unanimous)	UFC on Fox: Lawler vs. Brown	July 26, 2014	3	5:00	San Jose, California, United States	
Loss	11–5 (1)	Jimi Manuwa	TKO (doctor stoppage)	UFC on Fuel TV: Struve vs. Miocic	September 29, 2012	2	5:00	Nottingham, England, United Kingdom	
Loss	11–4 (1)	Glover Teixeira	Submission (arm-triangle choke)	UFC 146	May 26, 2012	1	1:53	Las Vegas, Nevada, United States	
Loss	11–3 (1)	Stephan Bonnar	Decision (unanimous)	UFC 139	November 19, 2011	3	5:00	San Jose, California, United States	
Win	11–2 (1)	Fábio Maldonado	Decision (unanimous)	The Ultimate Fighter 13 Finale	June 4, 2011	3	5:00	Las Vegas, Nevada, United States	Fight of the Night.
Win	10–2 (1)	Ricardo Romero	TKO (knees to the body and punches)	UFC 126	February 5, 2011	1	0:21	Las Vegas, Nevada, United States	
Win	9–2 (1)	Jared Hamman	Decision (unanimous)	UFC Fight Night: Marquardt vs. Palhares	September 15, 2010	3	5:00	Austin, Texas, United States	Fight of the Night.
Win	8–2 (1)	Razak Al-Hassan	Decision (split)	UFC 104	October 24, 2009	3	5:00	Los Angeles, California, United States	
Loss	7–2 (1)	Tom Lawlor	Decision (unanimous)	The Ultimate Fighter 8 Finale	December 13, 2008	3	5:00	Las Vegas, Nevada, United States	
Loss	7–1 (1)	Tony Lopez	TKO (punches)	KOTC: River Rage	September 15, 2007	1	1:36	Laughlin, Nevada, United States	
Win	7–0 (1)	Demian Decorah	Decision (unanimous)	KOTC: Battle at the Bowl	July 21, 2007	2	5:00	Lac du Flambeau, Wisconsin, United States	
NC	6–0 (1)	Maurice Jackson	NC	KOTC: Eclipse	May 26, 2007	1	N/A	San Carlos, Arizona, United States	
Win	6–0	Angelo Mcleroy	Submission (rear-naked choke)	KOTC: Caged Chaos	March 10, 2007	1	1:39	Laughlin, Nevada, United States	
Win	5–0	Rocky Batastini	Submission (rear-naked choke)	RITC 89: Triple Main Event	December 2, 2006	1	0:19	Fountain Hills, Arizona, United States	
Win	4–0	Aric Dylan	KO (punches)	RITC 87: Rage in the Cage	September 29, 2006	1	1:45	Phoenix, Arizona, United States	
Win	3–0	Brian Ryan	Decision (unanimous)	RITC 85: Xtreme Cage Fighting	August 5, 2006	3	3:00	Phoenix, Arizona, United States	
Win	2–0	Dan Glasgow	TKO (knee to the body and punches)	RITC 84: Celebrity Theatre	July 1, 2006	1	0:29	Phoenix, Arizona, United States	
Win	1–0	Joe Tsosie	KO (knee)	RITC 83: Rampage	June 10, 2006	1	0:19	Fountain Hills, Arizona, United States	
