= San Jacinto Unified School District =

Public school district in Riverside County, California

Address
- 2045 South San Jacinto Avenue San Jacinto, California, 92583; United States

District information
- Type: Public
- Motto: "Educating and Inspiring Excellence"
- Grades: K–12
- NCES District ID: 0634440

Students and staff
- Students: 9,919 (2020–2021)
- Teachers: 425.35 (FTE)
- Staff: 535.77 (FTE)
- Student–teacher ratio: 23.32:1

Other information
- Website: www.sanjacinto.k12.ca.us

San Jacinto Unified School District is a public school district located in the central part of Riverside County, California. The district serves almost all of the city of San Jacinto and a section of Hemet.

== List of schools ==
The following schools are part of the San Jacinto Unified School District:

=== Elementary schools ===
- HeadStart/State Preschool
- San Jacinto Elementary (opened in 1930s)
- De Anza Elementary (opened in 1987)
- Park Hill Elementary (opened in 1991)
- Jose Antonio Estudillo Elementary (opened in 2004)
- Clayton A. Record Jr. Elementary (opened in 2004)
- Megan Cope Elementary (opened in 2010)
- Rose Salgado Elementary School (opened in 2025)

=== K-8 ===
- Edward Hyatt World Language Academy-formerly Edward Hyatt Elementary.(opened in 2019)

=== Middle schools ===
- Monte Vista Middle School
- North Mountain Middle School
- San Jacinto Leadership Academy (Magnet School)

=== High school ===
- San Jacinto High School

=== Alternative schools ===
- Mountain View High School (Continuation High School)
- Mt. Heights Academy
