= San Jacinto High School (San Jacinto, California) =

Coordinates: 33°47′37″N 116°57′59″W

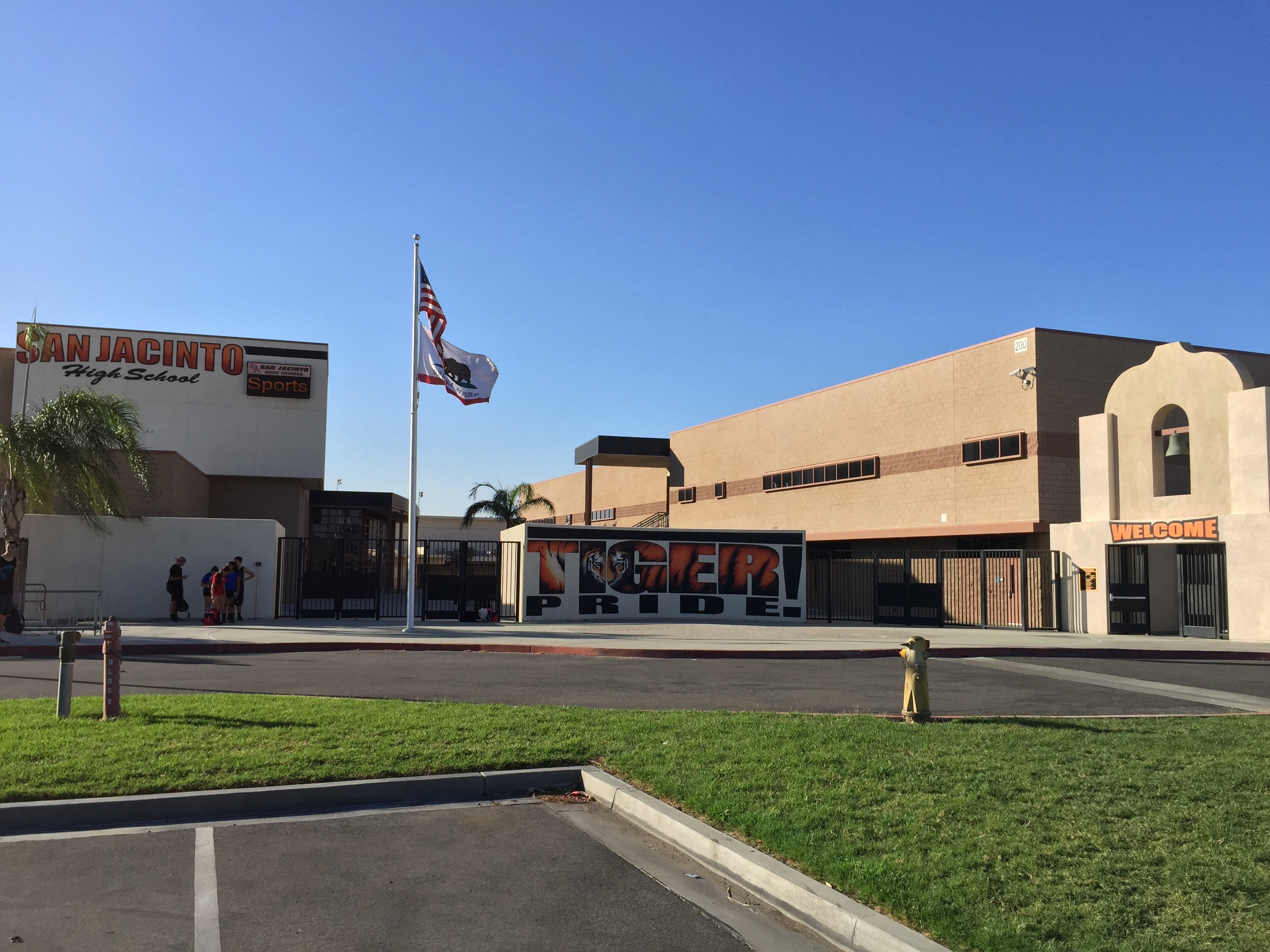

Location
- 500 Idyllwild Drive; San Jacinto, California 92583; United States

Information
- Type: Public high school
- Motto: Tigers Think, Tigers Thrive, Tigers Teach
- Established: 1910 (current location 1968)
- School district: San Jacinto Unified School District
- Principal: Lloyd Sheppard
- Faculty: 124.04 (on FTE basis)
- Grades: 9th–12th
- Enrollment: 2,388 (2024-2025)
- Student to teacher ratio: 19.25
- Colors: Orange; Black
- Mascot: Tiger
- Publication: TMN 10 (Tiger Media Network)
- Yearbook: Yameewo
- Website: sjhs.sanjacinto.k12.ca.us

San Jacinto High School is the sole public high school in the city of San Jacinto, California. The other high school in San Jacinto, Mountain View High School, is a small alternative school located near San Jacinto High's campus.

San Jacinto High is part of the San Jacinto Unified School District and is located on 17 acres (68,796 m^{2}) on the southeast side of San Jacinto close to the border of Hemet. San Jacinto High, which serves all of San Jacinto, was founded in 1910.

== History ==
San Jacinto Unified School District's first graduating class of three students occurred on June 5, 1891, at a grammar school that Professor Edward Hyatt opened in 1888. Professor Hyatt declined a place on the Stanford University faculty in order to "supervise the establishment of a high school" in San Jacinto. Hyatt would later become the first State Superintendent of Public Instruction for California in 1907. The first high school for the district opened on West First Street in 1910. This quickly became inadequate at meeting the needs of the growing city of San Jacinto, and in 1968 the current high school opened on Idyllwild Drive. On occasion of the relocation of the school, graduates commissioned Carl Barks to paint a picture of the old school building, for which Barks was paid 300$. The painting, titled "Last Days at an Old School", was unveiled in October 1968.

== Academics ==
San Jacinto High School offers several courses aligned with career and technical education. These courses, offered through CTE Pathways, are intended to provide students with experience in several types of career fields. Currently, the high school offers these CTE Pathways:

- Agriculture
- Culinary Arts
- Creative Digital Media
- Video Production
- Medical Assistant
- Sports Medicine
- Welding
- Wood Technology

Science, Technology, Engineering, and Math (STEM) education is also a major focus of the high school. In fall of 2014, San Jacinto High School launched the Biomedical Science program developed by Project Lead The Way. The program is a four-year academy that prepares students to major in fields related to medicine, engineering, and science.

== Athletics ==
=== Fall Sports ===
- Cross Country
- Football
- Golf (girls)
- Tennis (girls)
- Volleyball (girls)
- Water Polo (boys)

=== Winter Sports ===
- Basketball (boys)
- Basketball (girls)
- Soccer (boys)
- Soccer (girls)
- Water Polo (girls)
- Wrestling

=== Spring Sports ===
- Baseball
- Softball
- Golf (boys)
- Swimming
- Tennis (boys)
- Volleyball (boys)
- Track & Field

== Notable alumni ==
- David Irving, NFL player
- Sarah Robles, American weightlifter and Olympic bronze medalist
