= Bubba McDaniel =

American mixed martial artist (born 1983)

Robert "Bubba" McDaniel
- Born: May 3, 1983 (age 43); Childress, Texas, U.S.
- Other names: Bubba; The Menace
- Height: 6 ft 3 in (1.91 m)
- Weight: 204 lb (93 kg; 14 st 8 lb)
- Division: Middleweight; Light Heavyweight; Heavyweight
- Reach: 75 in (190 cm)
- Stance: Southpaw
- Fighting out of: Wichita Falls, Texas, U.S.
- Team: Jackson's MMA
- Years active: 2005–present

Mixed martial arts record
- Total: 41
- Wins: 31
- By knockout: 10
- By submission: 19
- By decision: 2
- Losses: 10
- By knockout: 3
- By submission: 6
- By decision: 1

Other information
- Mixed martial arts record from Sherdog

Robert "Bubba" McDaniel (born May 3, 1983) is an American mixed martial artist who formerly fought as a Middleweight for the Ultimate Fighting Championship where he went (1–2). He was a member of FX's The Ultimate Fighter: Team Jones vs. Team Sonnen. He is currently signed to the BKB Bare Knuckle Boxing roster.

== Mixed martial arts career ==
=== The Ultimate Fighter ===
In January 2013, it was announced that McDaniel was selected for The Ultimate Fighter: Team Jones vs. Team Sonnen. To get into the TUF house, McDaniel defeated Ryan Bigler by TKO. During the choosing of teams, he was the third pick of coach Jon Jones for Team Jones and sixth overall.

McDaniel faced eventual winner Kelvin Gastelum in the preliminary round. Despite being favored to win, McDaniel was submitted in the second round via rear-naked choke.

McDaniel was chosen by coach Jones for the wildcard spot and faced Kevin Casey. Bubba won via corner stoppage after Casey didn't answer the bell for the third round.

McDaniel lost via early KO to Uriah Hall in the quarterfinals.

=== Ultimate Fighting Championship ===
McDaniel made his UFC debut against castmate Gilbert Smith on April 13, 2013 at The Ultimate Fighter 17 Finale. He won the fight via submission in the third round.

McDaniel faced Brad Tavares on August 28, 2013 at UFC Fight Night 27. He lost the fight via unanimous decision.

McDaniel was expected to face TUF 17 castmate Tor Troéng on March 15, 2014 at UFC 171. However, Troéng was forced to pull out of the bout citing an injury. McDaniel instead faced UFC newcomer Sean Strickland. He lost the bout via submission in the first round and was subsequently released from the UFC.

=== Bellator MMA ===
Previous to fighting in the UFC, McDaniel appeared on an early Bellator MMA fight card in 2009. He faced William Chris Spicer at Bellator 6 and won the fight via rear-naked choke submission in the first round.

In May 2014, McDaniel signed with Bellator MMA. He made his return on June 6, 2014, facing Matt Jones at Bellator 121. He won the fight by unanimous decision.

McDaniel faced Emiliano Sordi on October 10, 2014 at Bellator 128. He lost via guillotine choke submission in the first round.

In his second fight for the promotion, McDaniel faced Kenyon Jackson at Bellator 146 on November 20, 2015. He won the fight via TKO in the second round.

After nearly two years away from Bellator, McDaniel was set to compete at Light Heavyweight when he replaced Muhammed Lawal against Liam McGeary at Bellator 185 on October 20, 2017. The following week, McGeary pulled out of the fight due to an injury.

== Personal life ==
McDaniel's two year old son, Wilder, was murdered by James Staley on October 11, 2018. Late October 2018, McDaniel was arrested for allegedly making terroristic threats against Staley, who was later found guilty of the murder of his son.

In August 2020, McDaniel was arested with the charge of aggravated assault with a deadly weapon for firing a handgun at a motorist during a road rage incident.

In July 2021, Bubba's wife was arrested and charged with tampering or fabricating physical evidence and abandoning or endangering a child in relation to the death of Wilder.

== Mixed martial arts record ==
Professional record breakdown
41 matches	31 wins	10 losses
By knockout	10	3
By submission	19	6
By decision	2	1

Res.	Record	Opponent	Method	Event	Date	Round	Time	Location	Notes
Win	31–10	Brian Houston	TKO (punches)	ECF 1	June 24, 2023	1	2:24	Wichita Falls, Texas, United States	Return to Light Heavyweight.
Win	30–10	Leonardo Pecanha	TKO (punches)	Zak Cummings Promotions - Stronger Men's Conference 2018	April 13, 2018	1	2:45	Springfield, Missouri, United States	
Win	29–10	Juan Torres	TKO (punches)	Strike League 1: Fight Your Fight	April 8, 2017	2	4:16	Cedar Park, Texas, United States	Heavyweight debut.
Win	28–10	Andre Kavanaugh	TKO (punches)	Horsepower Promotions - Fists of Fury 13	February 25, 2017	1	2:21	Lawton, Oklahoma, United States	
Win	27–10	Kenyon Jackson	TKO (punches)	Bellator 146	November 20, 2015	2	4:14	Thackerville, Oklahoma, United States	Catchweight (195 lbs) bout
Loss	26–10	Hayward Charles	Submission (anaconda choke)	HERO FC: Best of the Best VI	September 26, 2015	2	3:27	El Paso, Texas, United States	For Hero FC Middleweight Championship
Win	26–9	Kenyon Jackson	Submission (choke)	Legend Fights: Lopez vs. Alexander	July 24, 2015	1	4:06	Shawnee, Oklahoma, United States	
Win	25–9	Edgar Verdin	Submission (rear-naked choke)	Fury Fighting 7: McDaniel vs. Verdin	July 11, 2015	2	1:27	Humble, Texas, United States	Light Heavyweight bout
Win	24–9	Marvin Babe	TKO (punches)	Horsepower Promotions: Fists of Fury 8	March 7, 2015	1	3:45	Woodward, Oklahoma, United States	Light Heavyweight bout
Loss	23–9	Emiliano Sordi	Submission (guillotine choke)	Bellator 128	October 10, 2014	1	0:58	Thackerville, Oklahoma, United States	
Win	23–8	Ron Fields	Submission (rear-naked choke)	Extreme Combat Challenge: Fireworks	July 26, 2014	2	1:55	Indianapolis, Indiana, United States	
Win	22–8	Matt Jones	Decision (unanimous)	Bellator 121	June 6, 2014	3	5:00	Thackerville, Oklahoma, United States	Catchweight (190 lbs) bout
Loss	21–8	Sean Strickland	Submission (rear-naked choke)	UFC 171	March 15, 2014	1	4:33	Dallas, Texas, United States	
Loss	21–7	Brad Tavares	Decision (unanimous)	UFC Fight Night: Condit vs. Kampmann 2	August 28, 2013	3	5:00	Indianapolis, Indiana, United States	
Win	21–6	Gilbert Smith	Submission (triangle armbar)	The Ultimate Fighter 17 Finale	April 13, 2013	3	2:49	Las Vegas, Nevada, United States	
Win	20–6	Keith Cunagin	Submission (guillotine choke)	Legends of Fighting 53: Memorium	June 16, 2012	1	2:32	Indianapolis, Indiana, United States	Catchweight (195 lbs) bout
Win	19–6	Eric Schambari	Decision (unanimous)	Fight Game: Premier Event	December 2, 2011	3	5:00	Frisco, Texas, United States	
Win	18–6	Johnny Rees	Submission (rear-naked choke)	Legends of Fighting 45: Line of Fire	March 11, 2011	1	0:47	Indianapolis, Indiana, United States	
Win	17–6	Kyacey Uscola	TKO (punches)	Pure Fighting Championships 6	December 10, 2010	2	3:28	Red Deer, Alberta, Canada	
Win	16–6	Rob Wince	Submission (triangle choke)	Ohio Fight Conference: Round 5	July 17, 2010	2	2:08	Columbus, Ohio, United States	
Win	15–6	Nikolaos Rueve Boscarino	Submission (americana)	CNG Promotions: Queen City Meltdown	June 26, 2010	2	2:35	Cincinnati, Ohio, United States	
Loss	14–6	Lucas Lopes	KO (punches)	MMA Big Show: A Prodigy Returns	April 17, 2010	1	2:13	Florence, Indiana, United States	
Win	14–5	Billy Horne	TKO (punches)	MMA Big Show: Mayhem	September 17, 2009	1	0:43	Florence, Indiana, United States	
Win	13–5	William Chris Spicer	Submission (rear-naked-choke)	Bellator 6	May 8, 2009	1	2:53	Robstown, Texas, United States	
Loss	12–5	Alexander Shlemenko	TKO (flying knee to the body)	ShoXC: Elite Challenger Series	October 10, 2008	1	5:00	Hammond, Indiana, United States	
Win	12–4	Kala Hose	Submission (rear-naked-choke)	EliteXC: Return of the King	June 14, 2008	1	0:41	Honolulu, Hawaii, United States	
Win	11–4	Alex Cisne	TKO	KOTC: Rising Stars	May 24, 2008	2	2:37	Devol, Oklahoma, United States	
Loss	10–4	Tom Jones	Submission (north-south choke)	Freestyle Cage Fighting 17	Mar 15, 2008	1	1:04	Shawnee, Oklahoma, United States	
Loss	10–3	Dan Molina	Submission (heel hook)	KOTC: Arch Rivals	October 27, 2007	1	2:05	Reno, Nevada, United States	
Win	10–2	Blake Norsworthy	TKO	KOTC: Jawbreaker	September 29, 2007	1	2:43	Devol, Oklahoma, United States	
Win	9–2	Mike Queen	Submission (rear-naked-choke)	Freestyle Cage Fighting 12	August 18, 2007	3	1:03	Shawnee, Oklahoma, United States	
Win	8–2	Cody Malicott	Submission	Big Chief Promotions	June 9, 2007	1	0:45	Tulsa, Oklahoma, United States	
Win	7–2	Craig Cobb	Submission (triangle choke)	Freestyle Cage Fighting 10	April 7, 2007	1	1:42	Stillwater, Oklahoma, United States	
Loss	6–2	Gerald Harris	TKO (slam)	Freestyle Cage Fighting 6	November 10, 2006	2	4:55	Tulsa, Oklahoma, United States	
Win	6–1	Nick Budig	Submission (rear-naked choke)	Freestyle Cage Fighting: Brawl For It All 2	October 7, 2006	2	2:18	Tulsa, Oklahoma, United States	
Win	5–1	Jeff McConnell	Submission (rear-naked choke)	Freestyle Cage Fighting: Brawl For It All	August 19, 2006	1	1:26	Tulsa, Oklahoma, United States	
Win	4–1	Brandon McDowell	Submission	Ultimate Texas Showdown 5	April 29, 2006	1	0:56	Frisco, Texas, United States	
Win	3–1	Allan McGuire	Submission (armbar)	American Cage Fighting: Showdown at Sundown	Mar 10, 2006	1	0:27	Stillwater, Oklahoma, United States	
Win	2–1	Roger Kimes	Submission (armbar)	Xtreme Fighting League - EK 19: Battle at the Brady 3	February 18, 2006	1	1:27	Tulsa, Oklahoma, United States	
Loss	1–1	Horace Spencer	Submission (choke)	Xtreme Fighting League	December 30, 2005	1	N/A	Oklahoma, United States	
Win	1–0	York Ash	Submission (armbar)	World Fighting Organization	December 2, 2005	1	N/A	Oklahoma, United States	

== Kickboxing record ==
Kickboxing record
0 Win, 1 Losses(1 KO)
Date	Result	Opponent	Event	Location	Method	Round	Time	Record
2017-10-21	Loss	(United States) Kevin Holland	XKO 38	Dallas, United States	KO (Spinning Back Elbow)	1	1:29	0–1
Legend: Win Loss Draw/No contest Notes

== Bare knuckle boxing record ==
Professional record breakdown
1 match	0 wins	1 loss
By knockout	0	1

Res.	Record	Opponent	Method	Event	Date	Round	Time	Location	Notes
Loss	0–1	Chris Camozzi	KO (punch)	BKFC 31	October 15, 2022	2	0:37	Broomfield, Colorado, United States	

== See also ==
- List of current Bellator fighters
