= Kevin Casey (fighter) =

American mixed martial arts fighter

- Born: Kevin Berryman Casey Jr. June 15, 1981 (age 45); Inglewood, California, U.S.
- Other names: King
- Nationality: American
- Height: 5 ft 11 in (1.80 m)
- Weight: 185 lb (84 kg; 13.2 st)
- Division: Middleweight (2007–present)
- Reach: 76 in (193 cm)
- Style: Brazilian jiu-jitsu
- Fighting out of: Hawthorne, California, U.S.
- Team: Black House; Rickson Gracie Jiu-Jitsu
- Rank: Black belt in Brazilian Jiu-Jitsu
- Years active: 2007–present (MMA)

Mixed martial arts record
- Total: 19
- Wins: 9
- By knockout: 3
- By submission: 3
- By decision: 3
- Losses: 6
- By knockout: 6
- Draws: 2
- No contests: 2

Other information
- Notable relatives: Muhammad Ali (father-in-law); Laila Ali (sister-in-law)
- Mixed martial arts record from Sherdog

Kevin Berryman Casey Jr. (born June 15, 1981) is an American mixed martial artist who most recently competed in the Middleweight division of Bellator MMA. A professional competitor since 2007, he was a contestant on The Ultimate Fighter: Team Jones vs. Team Sonnen and also competed for Strikeforce, K-1, the RFA, and the UFC.

== Biography ==
Casey was born in Inglewood, California. He began to study Brazilian jiu-jitsu in 1995 when he befriended Rockson Gracie, son of Rickson Gracie.

Casey is a supporter of CHAMP, a non-profit organization founded by his brother Keith Casey that works to build the minds and bodies of inner city youth through mixed martial arts.

== Mixed martial arts career ==
Casey made his professional mixed martial arts debut in September 2007 for the K-1 Hero's promotion in Japan. He lost to Ikuhisa Minowa in the second round.

Following his unsuccessful debut, Casey made his first North American MMA appearance in 2008. He defeated Andrew Flores and Jimmy Mills in July and October, respectively, before taking a year off from the sport.

In November 2009, Casey made his Strikeforce debut on one of their Strikeforce Challengers cards. He defeated Chad Vance by submission. He made his second appearance for the promotion on May 21, 2010. He lost to Matt Lindland via TKO in the third round.

=== The Ultimate Fighter ===
In January 2013, it was revealed that Casey was a cast member of The Ultimate Fighter: Team Jones vs. Team Sonnen. He won his preliminary bout over Eldon Sproat via rear naked choke. Casey was selected by coach Sonnen as his sixth pick (eleventh overall). In the next round, Casey was pitted against coach Jones' fifth pick Collin Hart. He lost the bout via unanimous decision.

Casey was then given a second chance when he was chosen as Team Sonnen's wildcard. He fought against Team Jones' Bubba McDaniel. Despite controlling the first round, Casey lost via TKO at the end of the second round when he was unable to answer the bell for the third round. Many people, including Dana White, were shocked Kevin could just quit like that. Casey attributed this to difficulties relating to acute kidney injury from his drastic weight cut for his bout.

=== Ultimate Fighting Championship ===
On April 9, 2013, it was announced that Casey would face fellow season 17 alumni Josh Samman at The Ultimate Fighter 17 Finale. He lost the fight via TKO in the second round. Following the loss Casey was released from the promotion.

=== Resurrection Fighting Alliance ===
Following his release from the UFC, Casey signed with Resurrection Fighting Alliance (RFA). He made his RFA debut on August 16, 2013, at RFA 9 against Casey Ryan. He won the fight by unanimous decision. He fought next on January 24, 2014, against former UFC veteran Eddie Mendez. He won that fight via TKO (Elbows) in the first round.

=== Metamoris ===
Casey replaced Vinny Magalhães on 30 minutes notice at Metamoris 3, a submission-only jiu-jitsu competition, in Los Angeles on March 29, 2014. Casey was submitted by Keenan Cornelius via heel hook. In 2012, Casey himself had to pull out of a scheduled Metamoris competition, making his 2014 appearance his first participation with the organization.

Casey was scheduled to face Vinny Magalhaes at Metamoris 5, however was forced to withdraw just a week out from the November 22, 2014, competition due to a bloodclot in his calf that required surgery.

=== Return to UFC ===
Following his championship win at Resurrection Fighting Alliance 15, Casey was re-signed by the Ultimate Fighting Championship. He faced Bubba Bush at UFC 175 on July 5, 2014. He won the fight via TKO early in the first round due to a punch that dropped his opponent and subsequent elbows on the ground. However, Casey later failed a post-fight drug test for drostanolone, a form of anabolic steroid. Later, he was suspended for a year and fined $5,600 by the Nevada Athletic Commission.

Returning from his suspension, Casey faced Ildemar Alcântara on July 15, 2015, at UFC Fight Night 71. He won the fight by unanimous decision.

Casey faced Antônio Carlos Júnior on December 10, 2015, at UFC Fight Night 80. The bout was deemed a No Contest just 11 seconds into the first round when Júnior accidentally poked Casey in both eyes and Casey was unable to continue.

Casey faced Rafael Natal on January 30, 2016, at UFC on Fox 18. He lost the fight via TKO in the third round.

Casey next faced Elvis Mutapčić on June 4, 2016, at UFC 199. The fight ended in a split draw.

Casey faced Sam Alvey on August 27, 2016, at UFC on Fox 21. He lost the fight via TKO in the second round.

On October 21, 2016, the UFC announced that they had cut Casey from the promotion.

=== Bellator MMA ===
On November 1, 2016, it was announced that Casey had signed with Bellator. He faced Keith Berry at Bellator 170 on January 21, 2017. The bout ended in a majority draw.

Casey faced Chris Honeycutt at Bellator 182 on August 25, 2017. He lost the fight via TKO in the second round.

On February 20, 2018, it was announced that Bellator had released Casey from the promotion.

== Personal life ==
Casey is married to Hana Ali, the daughter of former heavyweight champion boxer Muhammad Ali and sister of WBC, WIBA, IWBF and IBA female super middleweight title and IWBF light heavyweight title holder Laila Ali.

== Championships and achievements ==
- Resurrection Fighting Alliance
  - RFA Middleweight Championship (One time, first)

== Mixed martial arts record ==
Professional record breakdown
19 matches	9 wins	6 losses
By knockout	3	6
By submission	3	0
By decision	3	0
Draws	2	
No contests	2	

Res.	Record	Opponent	Method	Event	Date	Round	Time	Location	Notes
Loss	9–6–2 (2)	Chris Honeycutt	TKO (punches)	Bellator 182	August 25, 2017	2	2:06	Verona, New York, United States	
Draw	9–5–2 (2)	Keith Berry	Draw (majority)	Bellator 170	January 21, 2017	3	5:00	Inglewood, California, United States	
Loss	9–5–1 (2)	Sam Alvey	TKO (punches)	UFC on Fox: Maia vs. Condit	August 27, 2016	2	4:56	Vancouver, British Columbia, Canada	
Draw	9–4–1 (2)	Elvis Mutapčić	Draw (split)	UFC 199	June 4, 2016	3	5:00	Inglewood, California, United States	
Loss	9–4 (2)	Rafael Natal	TKO (punches)	UFC on Fox: Johnson vs. Bader	January 30, 2016	3	3:37	Newark, New Jersey, United States	
NC	9–3 (2)	Antônio Carlos Júnior	NC (accidental eye poke)	UFC Fight Night: Namajunas vs. VanZant	December 10, 2015	1	0:11	Las Vegas, Nevada, United States	Casey was rendered unable to continue.
Win	9–3 (1)	Ildemar Alcântara	Decision (unanimous)	UFC Fight Night: Mir vs. Duffee	July 15, 2015	3	5:00	San Diego, California, United States	
NC	8–3 (1)	Bubba Bush	NC (overturned)	UFC 175	July 5, 2014	1	1:01	Las Vegas, Nevada, United States	Originally a KO (elbows) win for Casey; overturned after he tested positive for drostanolone.
Win	8–3	Andrew Sanchez	KO (punches)	RFA 15	June 6, 2014	1	2:30	Los Angeles, California, United States	Won the inaugural RFA Middleweight Championship.
Win	7–3	Eddie Mendez	TKO (elbows)	RFA 12	January 24, 2014	1	3:38	Los Angeles, California, United States	
Win	6–3	Casey Ryan	Decision (unanimous)	RFA 9	August 16, 2013	3	5:00	Los Angeles, California, United States	
Loss	5–3	Josh Samman	TKO (knees)	The Ultimate Fighter: Team Jones vs. Team Sonnen Finale	April 13, 2013	2	2:17	Las Vegas, Nevada, United States	
Win	5–2	Reggie Orr	Submission (rear-naked choke)	Samurai MMA Pro 2	April 15, 2012	1	2:53	Hollywood, California, United States	
Win	4–2	Daniel Mancha	TKO (punches)	Samurai MMA Pro 2011	October 22, 2011	1	1:16	Culver City, California, United States	
Loss	3–2	Matt Lindland	TKO (punches)	Strikeforce Challengers: Lindland vs. Casey	May 21, 2010	3	3:41	Portland, Oregon, United States	
Win	3–1	Chad Vance	Submission (rear-naked choke)	Strikeforce Challengers: Woodley vs. Bears	November 20, 2009	1	1:41	Kansas City, Kansas, United States	
Win	2–1	Jimmy Mills	Submission (rear-naked choke)	EFA: Caged Fury	October 25, 2008	1	4:27	Monroe, Louisiana, United States	
Win	1–1	Andrew Flores	Decision (unanimous)	Fist Series: SummerFist 2008	July 27, 2008	3	5:00	Irvine, California, United States	
Loss	0–1	Ikuhisa Minowa	TKO (punches)	K-1 Hero's: Tournament Final	September 17, 2007	2	0:42	Yokohama, Japan	

=== Mixed martial arts exhibition record ===
Exhibition record breakdown		
3 matches	1 win	2 losses
By knockout	0	1
By submission	1	0
By decision	0	1

Res.	Record	Opponent	Method	Event	Date	Round	Time	Location	Notes
Loss	1–2	Bubba McDaniel	TKO (corner stoppage)	TUF 17	March 19, 2013 (airdate)	2	5:00	Las Vegas, Nevada, United States	Wildcard fight
Loss	1–1	Collin Hart	Decision (unanimous)	TUF 17	February 12, 2013 (airdate)	2	5:00	Las Vegas, Nevada, United States	
Win	1–0	Eldon Sproat	Submission (rear-naked choke)	TUF 17	January 22, 2013 (airdate)	1	N/A	Las Vegas, Nevada, United States	Preliminary round

== See also ==
- List of current Bellator fighters
- List of male mixed martial artists
