= San Jacinto, California =

City in California, United States

- City
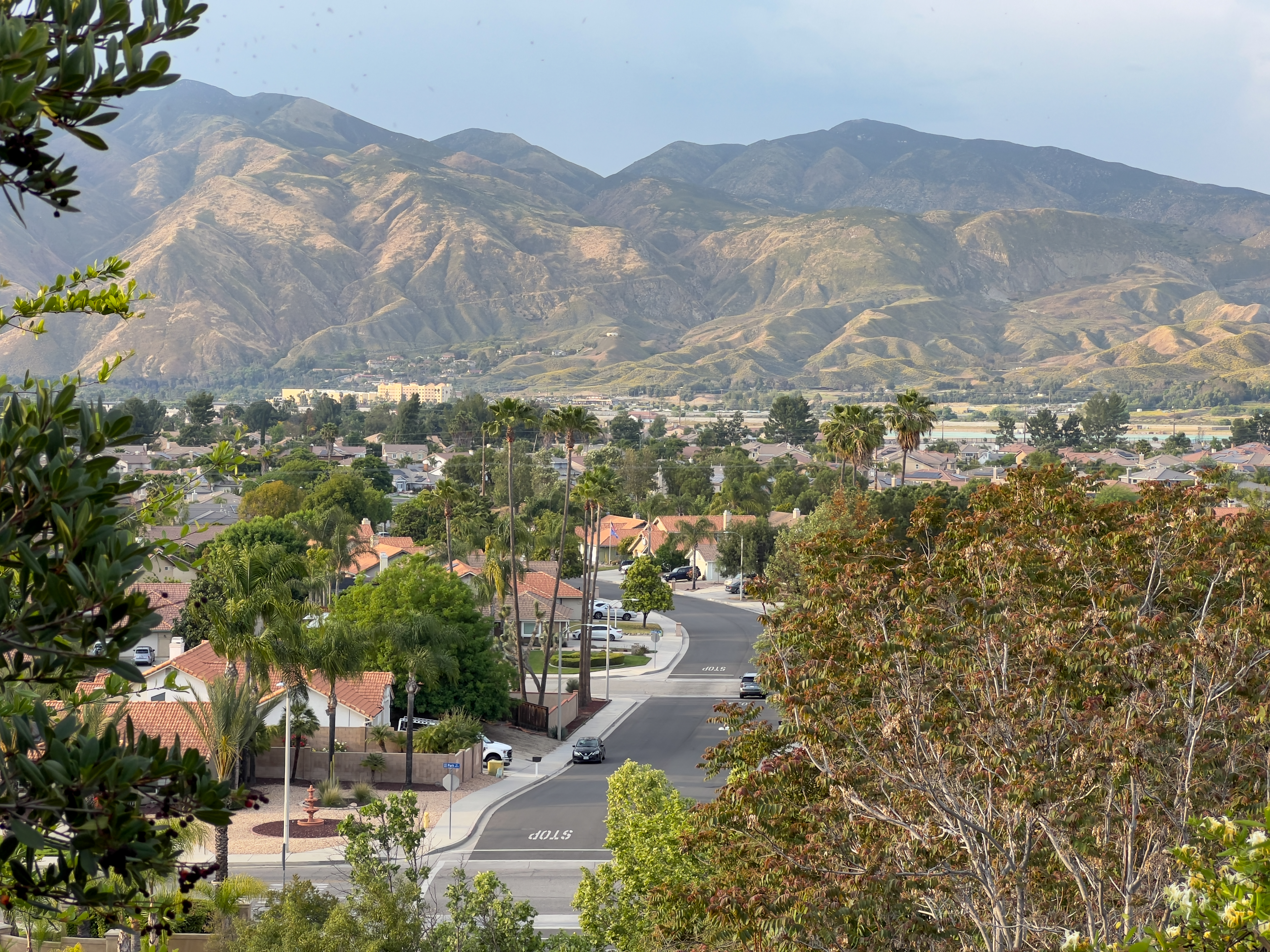
- San Jacinto neighborhood with San Jacinto Mountains in the background

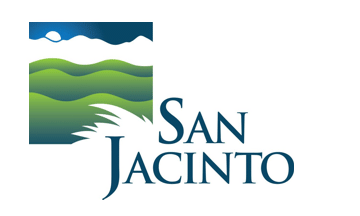
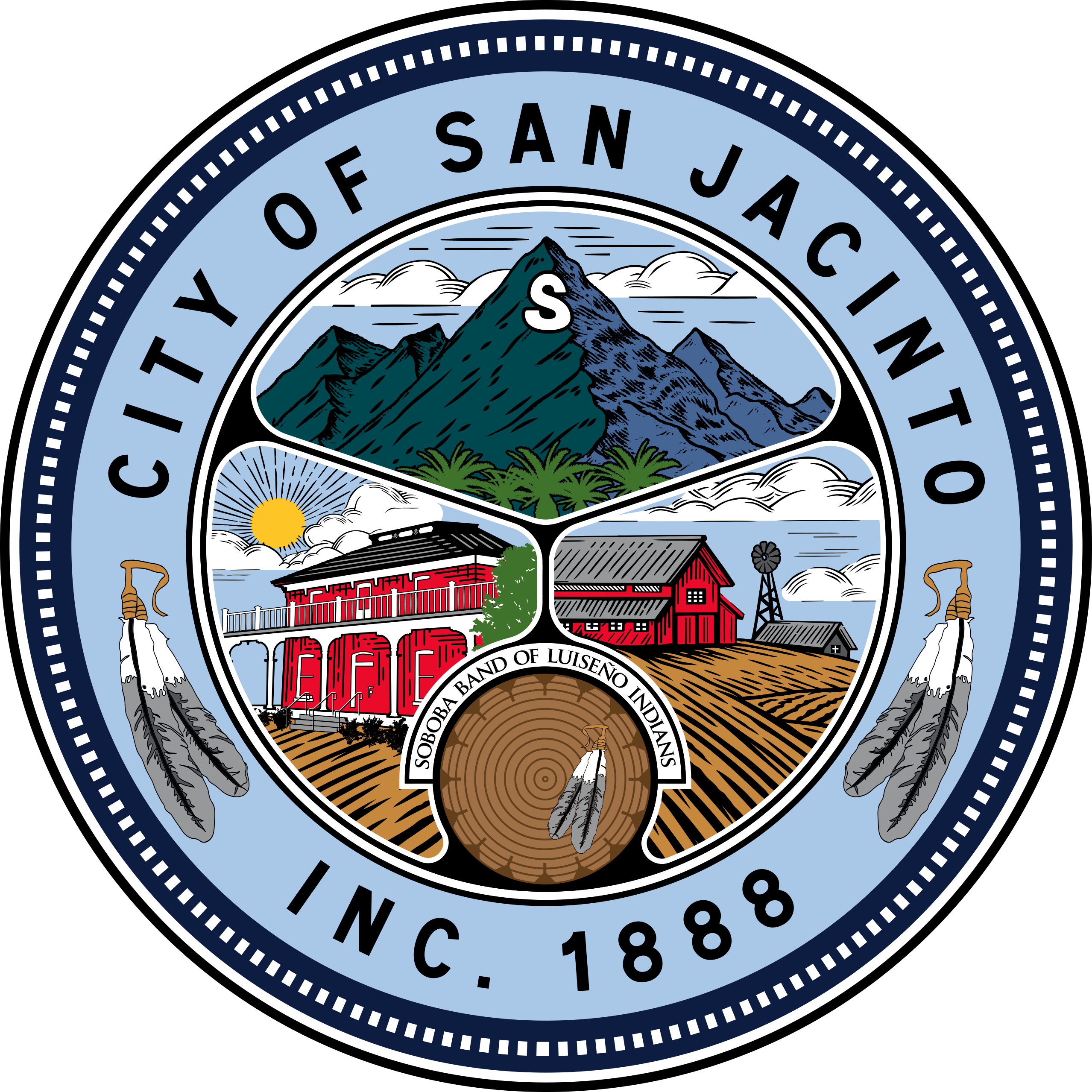
- Flag Seal
- Interactive map of San Jacinto, California
- Location in the United States
- Coordinates: 33°47′14″N 116°58′0″W
- Country: United States
- State: California
- County: Riverside
- Native American Reservation (partial): Soboba Band of Luiseño Indians
- Incorporated: April 20, 1888
- Named for: St. Hyacinth of Caesarea

Government
  - Type: Council-Manager
  - Mayor: Valerie Vandever
  - Mayor Pro Tem: Alonso Ledezma
  - City Council: Phil Ayala; Crystal Ruiz; Clarisa Sanchez
  - City manager: Robert Johnson

Area
  - Total: 26.12 sq mi (67.66 km^{2})
  - Land: 25.96 sq mi (67.23 km^{2})
  - Water: 0.17 sq mi (0.43 km^{2}) 0.63%
- Elevation: 1,565 ft (477 m)

Population (2020)
  - Total: 53,898
  - Density: 2,076/sq mi (801.7/km^{2})
- Time zone: UTC-8 (PST)
  - Summer (DST): UTC-7 (PDT)
- ZIP codes: 92581-92583
- Area code: 951
- FIPS code: 06-67112
- GNIS feature IDs: 1652787, 2411788
- Website: www.sanjacintoca.gov

San Jacinto (/ˌsæn həˈsɪntoʊ, - dʒəˈ-, - jəˈ-/ SAN hə-SIN-toh, - jə-, - yə- ; Spanish: [saŋ xaˈsinto]; Spanish for 'St. Hyacinth') is a city in Riverside County, California, United States. It is at the north end of the San Jacinto Valley, with Hemet to its south and Beaumont to its north. The mountains associated with the valley are the San Jacinto Mountains. The population was 53,898 at the 2020 census. The city was founded in 1870 and incorporated on April 20, 1888, making it one of the oldest cities in Riverside County.

The city is home to Mt. San Jacinto College, a community college founded in 1965. San Jacinto will also be home to the eastern end of the Mid County Parkway, a planned route that would eventually connect it to the city of Perris. In the late 19th century and early 20th century, the city became a home to many dairies, and a center for agriculture.

San Jacinto also is home to the Soboba Casino, a casino owned and operated by the Soboba Band of Luiseño Indians. The Sobobas are sovereign and self-sufficient in community affairs.

== History ==
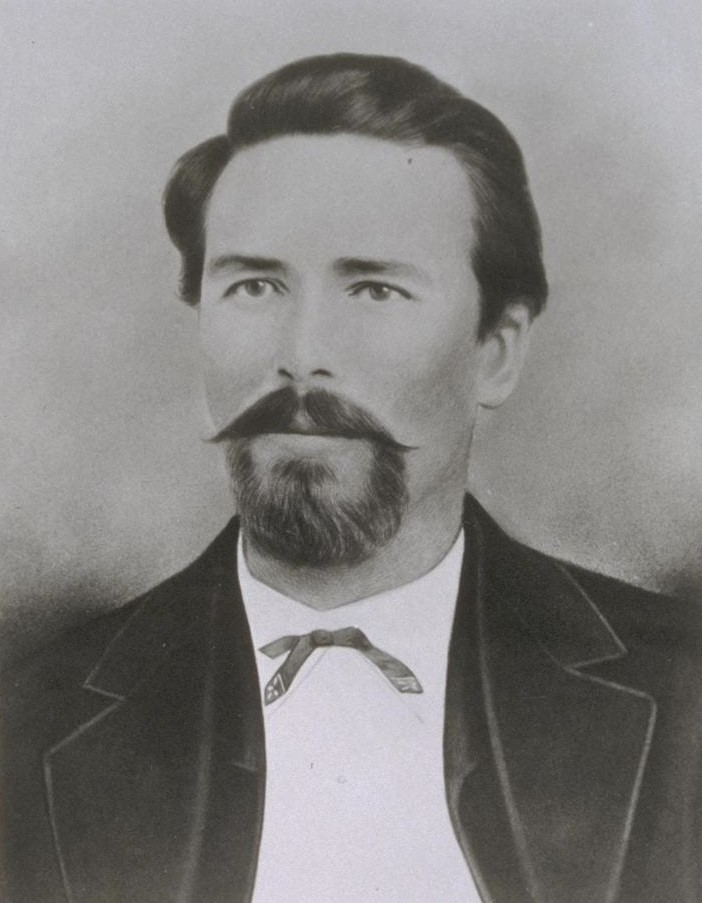
San Jacinto grew out of Rancho San Jacinto Viejo, granted in 1842 to Californio politician Don José Antonio Estudillo, considered to be the founder of San Jacinto and a member of the prominent Estudillo family of California.

The Luiseño were the original inhabitants of what later would be called the San Jacinto Valley, having many villages with residents.

The Anza Trail, one of the first European overland routes to California, named after Juan Bautista de Anza,^{4} crossed the valley in the 1770s. Mission padres named the valley, San Jacinto, which is Spanish for Saint Hyacinth, and around 1820 they established an outpost there.

In 1883, the San Jacinto Land Association laid out the modern city of San Jacinto at Five Points. The railroad arrived in 1888 and the city government was incorporated that same year.

The local economy was built on agriculture for many years and the city also received a boost from the many tourists who visited the nearby hot springs. The city, and its residents, helped to start the Ramona Pageant ( California's official State Outdoor Play), in 1923, and have supported the historic production ever since.

On July 15, 1937, San Jacinto was the end point for the longest uninterrupted airplane flight to that date when Mikhail Gromov's crew of three made the historic 6,262-mile (10,078 km) polar flight from Moscow, USSR, in a Tupolev ANT-25. This flight followed another similar historic flight over the pole when Valery Chkalov's crew of three ended up in Vancouver's Pearson Airfield earlier that same year. With these two flights, the USSR earned two major milestones in the Fédération Aéronautique Internationale (FAI) flight records. In the early 1950s the fraternal group E Clampus Vitus and the Riverside County Department of Transportation commemorated the Gromov flight by erecting a stone marker on Cottonwood Avenue, just west of Sanderson Avenue in west-central San Jacinto. The landing site is also marked by California State Historical Landmark Number 989.

== Geography ==
San Jacinto is located at 33°47′14″N 116°58′0″W (33.787119, −116.966672).

According to the United States Census Bureau, the city has a total area of 26.1 square miles (67.7 km^{2}), of which 25.9 square miles (67.2 km^{2}) is land and 0.17 square miles (0.43 km^{2}), or 0.63%, is water. The San Jacinto reservoir is an artificial lake used as a basin for the San Diego Aqueduct, a branch of the Colorado River Aqueduct, west of town.

Since local geological records have been kept, the city has been struck by two large earthquakes, one on Christmas Day in 1899, and the other on April 21, 1918.

== Climate ==
San Jacinto has a hot-summer mediterranean climate (Köppen: Csa) hot, dry summers and cool, wet winters.

Climate data for San Jacinto, California, 1991–2020 normals, extremes 1978–present
Month	Jan	Feb	Mar	Apr	May	Jun	Jul	Aug	Sep	Oct	Nov	Dec	Year
Record high °F (°C)	91 (33)	91 (33)	99 (37)	103 (39)	110 (43)	114 (46)	115 (46)	115 (46)	116 (47)	108 (42)	96 (36)	90 (32)	116 (47)
Mean maximum °F (°C)	81.1 (27.3)	82.1 (27.8)	87.3 (30.7)	93.5 (34.2)	98.4 (36.9)	104.0 (40.0)	107.2 (41.8)	108.3 (42.4)	105.5 (40.8)	98.4 (36.9)	89.3 (31.8)	81.2 (27.3)	110.2 (43.4)
Mean daily maximum °F (°C)	65.8 (18.8)	65.8 (18.8)	70.2 (21.2)	74.4 (23.6)	80.4 (26.9)	88.7 (31.5)	95.1 (35.1)	96.5 (35.8)	91.8 (33.2)	82.3 (27.9)	72.7 (22.6)	65.0 (18.3)	79.1 (26.1)
Daily mean °F (°C)	52.9 (11.6)	53.7 (12.1)	57.6 (14.2)	61.2 (16.2)	66.8 (19.3)	73.2 (22.9)	79.3 (26.3)	80.4 (26.9)	76.3 (24.6)	67.5 (19.7)	58.5 (14.7)	52.0 (11.1)	65.0 (18.3)
Mean daily minimum °F (°C)	40.1 (4.5)	41.7 (5.4)	45.0 (7.2)	47.9 (8.8)	53.3 (11.8)	57.6 (14.2)	63.6 (17.6)	64.3 (17.9)	60.7 (15.9)	52.7 (11.5)	44.4 (6.9)	39.0 (3.9)	50.9 (10.5)
Mean minimum °F (°C)	29.4 (−1.4)	32.4 (0.2)	35.2 (1.8)	38.0 (3.3)	43.8 (6.6)	49.1 (9.5)	54.2 (12.3)	54.3 (12.4)	50.3 (10.2)	41.9 (5.5)	33.5 (0.8)	28.4 (−2.0)	25.0 (−3.9)
Record low °F (°C)	7 (−14)	16 (−9)	17 (−8)	24 (−4)	30 (−1)	31 (−1)	40 (4)	37 (3)	35 (2)	24 (−4)	19 (−7)	17 (−8)	7 (−14)
Average precipitation inches (mm)	2.66 (68)	2.76 (70)	1.69 (43)	0.79 (20)	0.47 (12)	0.07 (1.8)	0.20 (5.1)	0.12 (3.0)	0.26 (6.6)	0.54 (14)	0.77 (20)	1.87 (47)	12.20 (310)
Average precipitation days (≥ 0.01 in)	6.2	6.2	5.3	2.9	2.3	0.3	0.6	0.6	0.9	1.8	3.0	5.1	35.2
Source 1: NOAA
Source 2: National Weather Service

== Demographics ==
=== Ethnic and Racial Composition ===
San Jacinto, California – Racial and ethnic composition Note: the US Census treats Hispanic/Latino as an ethnic category. This table excludes Latinos from the racial categories and assigns them to a separate category. Hispanics/Latinos may be of any race.
Race / Ethnicity (NH = Non-Hispanic)	Pop 1980	Pop 1990	Pop 2000	Pop 2010	Pop 2020	% 1980	% 1990	% 2000	% 2010	% 2020
White alone (NH)	4,807	10,154	12,507	15,508	12,180	67.72%	62.64%	52.60%	35.09%	22.60%
Black or African American alone (NH)	0	182	571	2,702	4,459	0.00%	1.12%	2.40%	6.11%	8.27%
Native American or Alaska Native alone (NH)	85	252	322	405	437	1.20%	1.55%	1.35%	0.92%	0.81%
Asian alone (NH)	42	134	246	1,254	1,687	0.59%	0.83%	1.03%	2.84%	3.13%
Native Hawaiian or Pacific Islander alone (NH)	42	134	31	102	231	0.59%	0.83%	0.13%	0.23%	0.43%
Other race alone (NH)	0	33	30	64	254	0.00%	0.20%	0.13%	0.14%	0.47%
Mixed race or Multiracial (NH)	x	x	489	1,055	1,637	x	x	2.06%	2.39%	3.04%
Hispanic or Latino (any race)	2,164	5,455	9,583	23,109	33,013	30.49%	33.65%	40.30%	52.28%	61.25%
Total	7,098	16,210	23,779	44,199	53,898	100.00%	100.00%	100.00%	100.00%	100.00%

Historical population
Census	Pop.	Note	%±
1890	661		—
1900	583		−11.8%
1910	898		54.0%
1920	945		5.2%
1930	1,346		42.4%
1940	1,356		0.7%
1950	1,778		31.1%
1960	2,553		43.6%
1970	4,385		71.8%
1980	7,098		61.9%
1990	16,210		128.4%
2000	23,779		46.7%
2010	44,199		85.9%
2020	53,898		21.9%
U.S. Decennial Census

=== 2020 census ===
As of the 2020 census, San Jacinto had a population of 53,898. The population density was 2,076.4 inhabitants per square mile (801.7/km^{2}). The median age was 32.4 years. 29.5% of residents were under the age of 18 and 11.7% were 65 years of age or older. For every 100 females, there were 94.9 males, and for every 100 females age 18 and over, there were 91.5 males.

The census reported that 99.5% of the population lived in households, 0.4% lived in non-institutionalized group quarters, and 0.1% were institutionalized. In addition, 96.7% of residents lived in urban areas, while 3.3% lived in rural areas.

There were 15,201 households, out of which 47.0% had children under the age of 18 living in them. Of all households, 50.5% were married-couple households, 8.2% were cohabiting couple households, 26.1% had a female householder with no partner present, and 15.2% had a male householder with no partner present. 16.8% of households were one person, and 8.4% had someone living alone who was 65 years of age or older. The average household size was 3.53. There were 11,845 families (77.9% of all households).

There were 15,998 housing units at an average density of 616.3 units per square mile (238.0 units/km^{2}), of which 15,201 (95.0%) were occupied. Of these, 68.1% were owner-occupied, and 31.9% were occupied by renters. The homeowner vacancy rate was 1.6%, and the rental vacancy rate was 4.0%.

Racial composition as of the 2020 census
Race	Number	Percent
White	18,033	33.5%
Black or African American	4,725	8.8%
American Indian and Alaska Native	1,575	2.9%
Asian	1,838	3.4%
Native Hawaiian and Other Pacific Islander	279	0.5%
Some other race	17,828	33.1%
Two or more races	9,620	17.8%

=== 2023 ACS estimates ===
In 2023, the US Census Bureau estimated that the median household income was $78,281, and the per capita income was $26,286. About 12.3% of families and 16.5% of the population were below the poverty line.

=== 2010 census ===
The 2010 United States census reported that San Jacinto had a population of 44,199. The population density was 1,691.4 inhabitants per square mile (653.1/km^{2}). The racial makeup of San Jacinto was 25,272 (57.2%) White (35.1% Non-Hispanic White), 2,928 (6.6%) African American, 812 (1.8%) Native American, 1,341 (3.0%) Asian, 124 (0.3%) Pacific Islander, 11,208 (25.4%) from other races, and 2,514 (5.7%) from two or more races. Hispanic or Latino of any race were 23,109 persons (52.3%).

The Census reported that 43,971 people (99.5% of the population) lived in households, 169 (0.4%) lived in non-institutionalized group quarters, and 59 (0.1%) were institutionalized.

There were 13,152 households, out of which 6,460 (49.1%) had children under the age of 18 living in them, 6,954 (52.9%) were opposite-sex married couples living together, 2,121 (16.1%) had a female householder with no husband present, 912 (6.9%) had a male householder with no wife present. There were 938 (7.1%) unmarried opposite-sex partnerships, and 111 (0.8%) same-sex married couples or partnerships. 2,459 households (18.7%) were made up of individuals, and 1,231 (9.4%) had someone living alone who was 65 years of age or older. The average household size was 3.34. There were 9,987 families (75.9% of all households); the average family size was 3.81.

The population was spread out, with 14,487 people (32.8%) under the age of 18, 4,404 people (10.0%) aged 18 to 24, 11,885 people (26.9%) aged 25 to 44, 8,755 people (19.8%) aged 45 to 64, and 4,668 people (10.6%) who were 65 years of age or older. The median age was 30.3 years. For every 100 females, there were 95.6 males. For every 100 females age 18 and over, there were 91.4 males.

There were 14,977 housing units at an average density of 573.2 per square mile (221.3/km^{2}), of which 8,943 (68.0%) were owner-occupied, and 4,209 (32.0%) were occupied by renters. The homeowner vacancy rate was 5.7%; the rental vacancy rate was 10.3%. 28,777 people (65.1% of the population) lived in owner-occupied housing units and 15,194 people (34.4%) lived in rental housing units.

According to the 2010 United States Census, San Jacinto had a median household income of $47,453, with 18.9% of the population living below the federal poverty line.

== Government ==
Federal:

- In the United States House of Representatives, San Jacinto is in California's 25th congressional district, represented by Democrat Raul Ruiz.

State:

- In the California State Legislature, San Jacinto is in the 31st senatorial district, represented by Democrat Sabrina Cervantes, and the 60th Assembly district, represented by Democrat Corey Jackson.

Local:

- In the Riverside County Board of Supervisors, San Jacinto is in the Third District, represented by Chuck Washington.

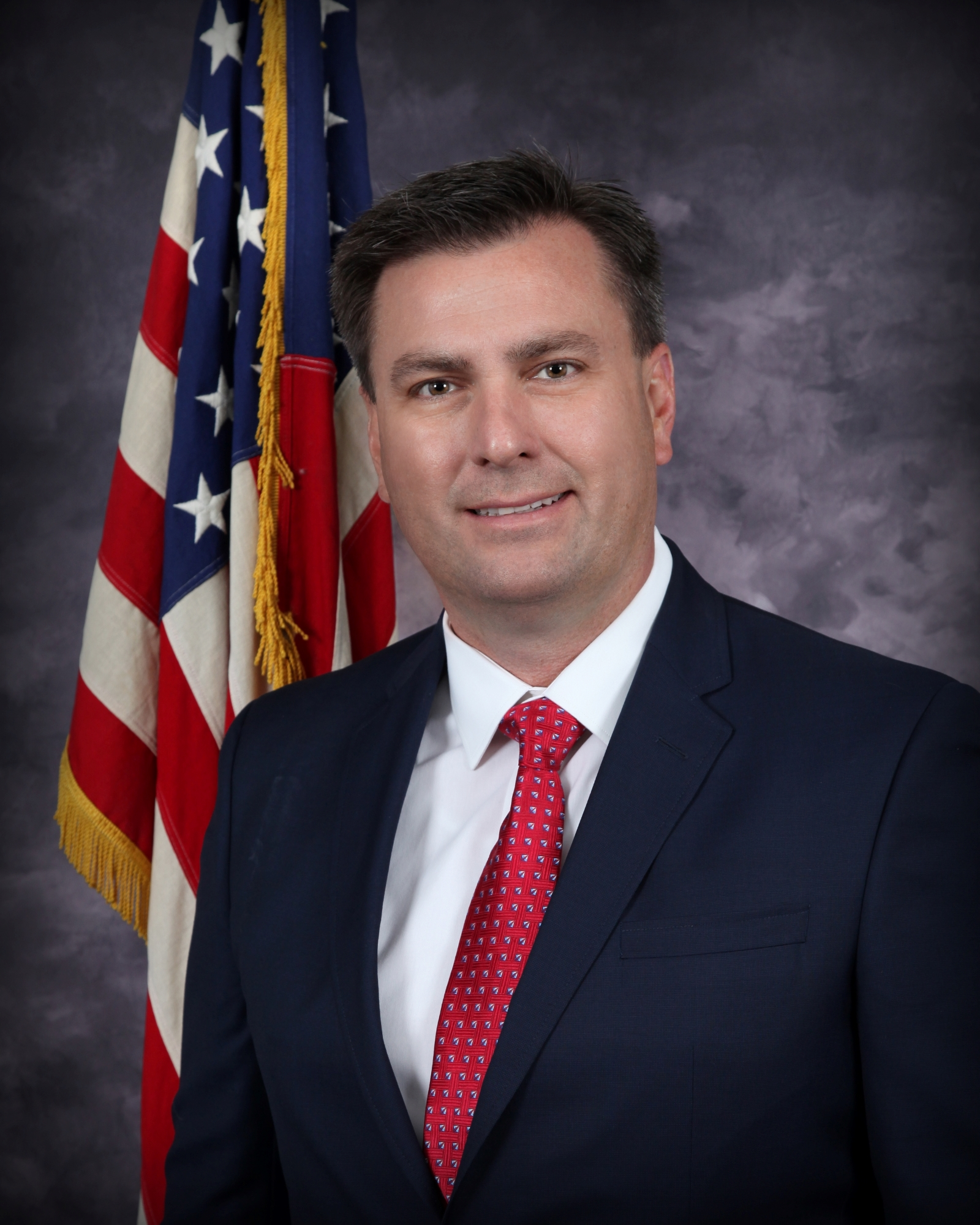
Mayor Andrew Kotyuk

== Tourism ==
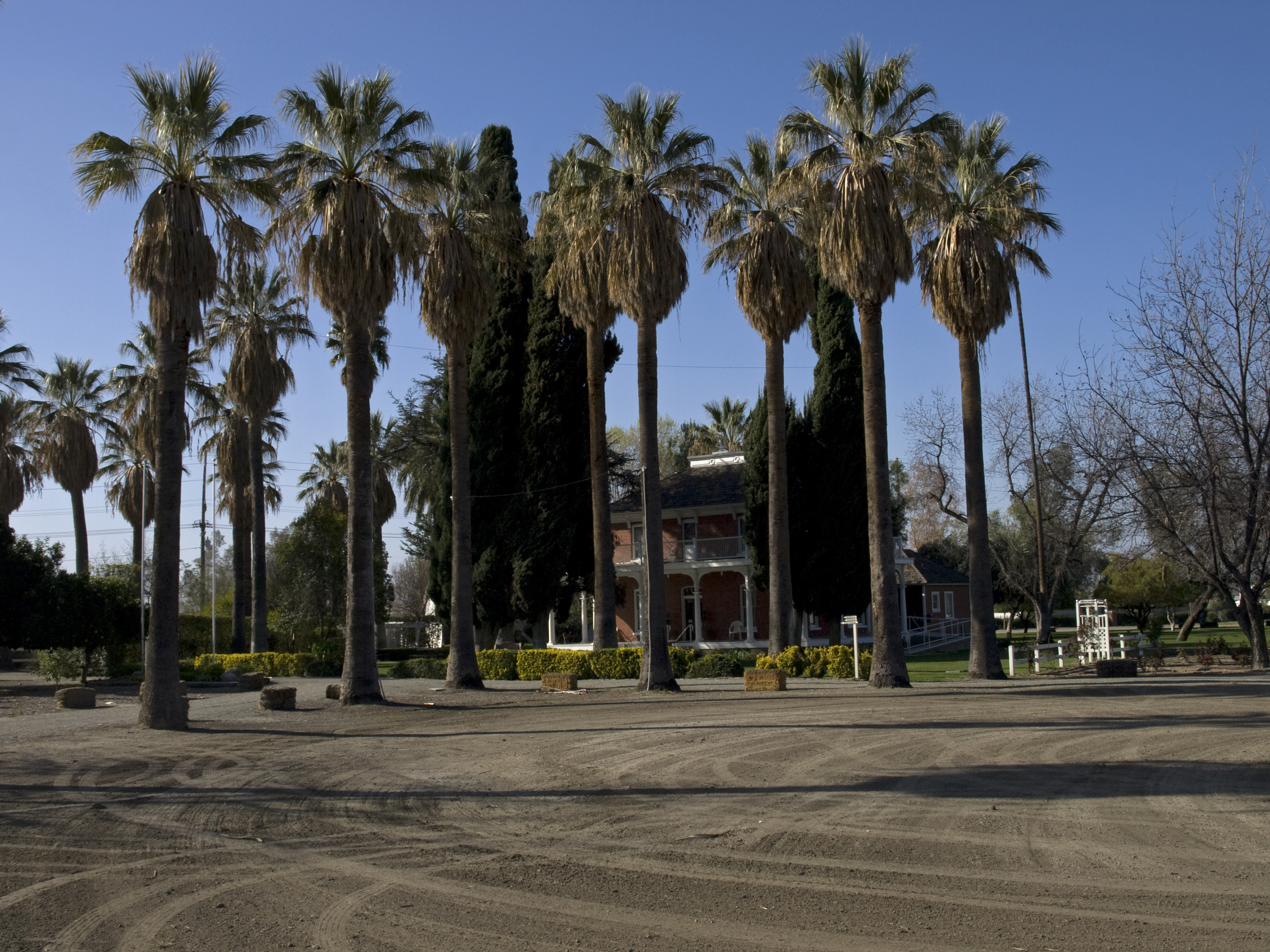
Estudillo Mansion

San Jacinto has a memorial to veterans at Druding Park is a tribute to the men and women of the U.S. Armed Services. In the park, each branch of the military has an equipment artifact used by its members in battle, as a symbol of their services. There is a tank for the Army, a propeller for the Air Force, an anchor for the Navy, a lighthouse for the Coast Guard, and in the near future the city government hopes to add a howitzer for the Marine Corps. Various plaques and memorials also grace the 1-acre (4,000 m^{2}) park.

The city is also home to the Estudillo Mansion, which was home to Francisco Estudillo, who was the city's first postmaster and was elected as the city's second mayor. The mansion also has a twin mansion built by Estudillo's brother, Jose Antonio Estudillo, Jr. The two mansions and the grounds are all that remains of the original 35,000-acre (140 km^{2}) Mexican land grant given to the brother's father, Jose Antonio Estudillo in 1842. The mansion was placed on the National Register of Historic Places and on the California Register of Historic Resources. This is only the third Riverside County site to receive this honor.

== Services ==
=== Public safety ===
==== Police ====
The city is served by the Riverside County Sheriff's Department.

==== Fire ====
The city of San Jacinto contracts for fire and paramedic services with the Riverside County Fire Department through a cooperative agreement with CAL FIRE. Fire Station 25 is also a CAL FIRE fire station which has a wildland fire engine.

=== Education ===
The majority of the city is served by the San Jacinto Unified School District, made up of 12 schools. There is one comprehensive high school, San Jacinto High School (San Jacinto, California), and a continuation high school, Mountain View High School. There are 7 elementary schools and 3 middle schools in the city, and one independent studies program on the Mountain View High School campus site. A 6–12 magnet school, San Jacinto Leadership Academy, operates on the past Monte Vista Middle School campus, serving nearly 600 children.

Portions of San Jacinto are in Hemet Unified School District, and the Nuview Union Elementary School District and Perris Union High School District (for senior high school).

The San Jacinto Valley Academy is a K–12 charter school.

=== Cemetery ===
The San Jacinto Valley Cemetery District maintains the San Jacinto Valley Cemetery in the city. Notable burials include Danish cartoonist Henning Dahl Mikkelsen who created the strip Ferd'nand.

=== Arts ===
The Diamond Valley Arts Council (DVAC) maintains an arts complex called the Esplanade Arts Center (EAC), which features an art gallery, community arts classes, and a performance space home to the Inland Stage Company (ISC).

== Sports ==
Mt. San Jacinto College (the Eagles) has a sports stadium for college football and a gymnasium for college basketball, along with a ball park for a collegiate baseball team the Diamond Valley Sabers of the SCCBL (Southern California Baseball League) who also play home games in the Diamond Valley Field in Hemet.

The So Cal Coyotes of the DFI (Developmental Football International) plays half their home games in the Soboba Casino Oaks Sports Complex and their home field in Rancho Mirage in 2013, but the team has moved their home field to Shadow Hills Stadium in Indio in 2018.

The Soboba Casino's sports complex also has an indoor sports facility for boxing events held in the Soboba Indian Reservation.

== See also ==
- Gold Base – the Church of Scientology international headquarters, located nearby
