= José Estudillo =

José Estudillo may refer to:

- José María Estudillo (died 1830), early Spanish settler of California, or to one of his sons:
- José Joaquín Estudillo (1800–1852), Californian settler
- José Antonio Estudillo (1805–1852), Californian settler
- José Guadalupe Estudillo, son of José Antonio, California State Treasurer

== See also ==
- Estudillo family of California
