= Estudillo House =

Estudillo House may refer to:

- Estudillo House, a city landmark in Riverside, California; see List of landmarks in Riverside, California#Estudillo House
- Casa de Estudillo, in San Diego, California
- Casa de Estudillo (San Leandro, California)
- Estudillo Mansion, in San Jacinto, California

== See also ==
- Estudillo family of California
