= Rancho San Leandro =

Mexican land grant in California

Coordinates: 37.720°N 122.150°W

Rancho San Leandro was a 6,830-acre (27.6 km^{2}) Mexican land grant in present-day Alameda County, California, given in 1842 by Governor Juan Alvarado to José Joaquín Estudillo. The grant extended along the east San Francisco Bay from San Leandro Creek south to San Lorenzo Creek, and encompassed present-day San Leandro.

== History ==
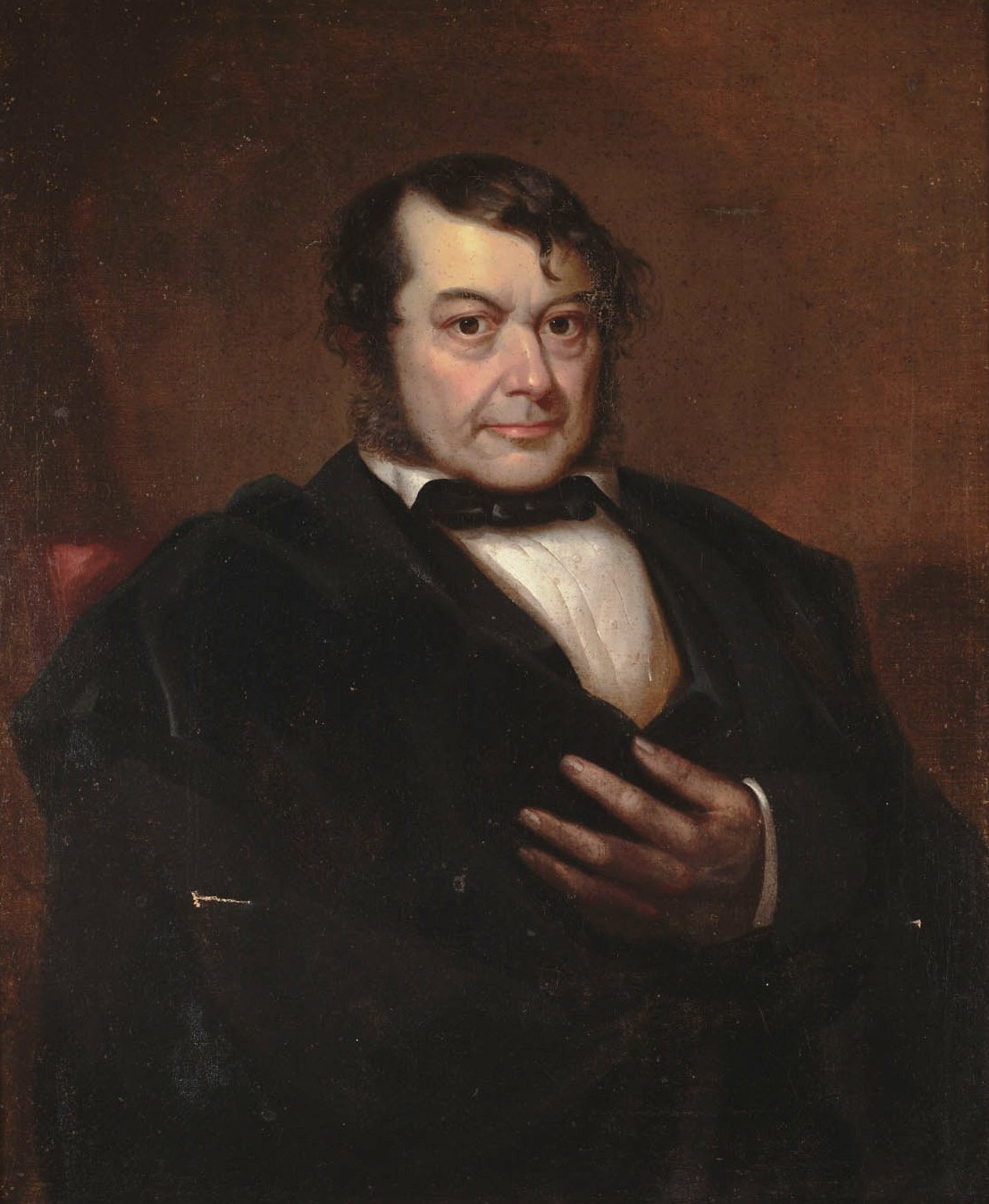
Californio statesman José Joaquín Estudillo.

José Joaquín Estudillo(1800 – 1852), son of Spanish soldier José María Estudillo and brother of José Antonio Estudillo, was born at the Presidio of Monterey and joined the Spanish Army at the age of 15. In 1823, Estudillo married Juana del Carmen Martinez (daughter of Ygnacio Martínez, grantee of Rancho El Pinole). In 1835, Estudillo was the commissioner for the secularization of Mission San Francisco de Asís. In 1835, he was elected alcalde of Yerba Buena. After his one-year term, Estudillo, his wife, and ten children moved across the San Francisco Bay, settling on San Leandro Creek just south of the Peraltas' Rancho San Antonio.

With the cession of California to the United States following the Mexican-American War, the 1848 Treaty of Guadalupe Hidalgo provided that Mexican land grants would be honored. As required by the Land Act of 1851, a claim was filed for Rancho San Leandro with the Public Land Commission in 1852, and the grant was patented to José Joaquín Estudillo in 1863.

The grant was for one square league ("more or less") and the official survey was larger than one square league. The vaguely defined eastern boundary of the grant caused problems with his Rancho San Lorenzo neighbor Guillermo Castro. Castro filed a separate claim for Rancho San Leandro in 1853, but it was rejected. Squatters encroached on the Estudillo land in 1851 such that their encampment became known as "Squatterville". José Joaquín Estudillo died in June 1852 in San Francisco. Through the efforts of two of Estudillo's sons-in-law, John B. Ward and William Heath Davis, the squatters were brought under control. Property was deeded to Clement Boyreau to bring the case to federal court. After the US Supreme Court ruled in favor of the Estudillo family, many of the squatters purchased the land.

== See also ==
- Ranchos of Alameda County, California
