= William Heath Davis =

American entrepreneur (1822–1909)

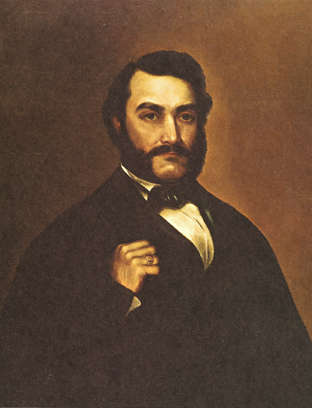
William Heath Davis in his youth

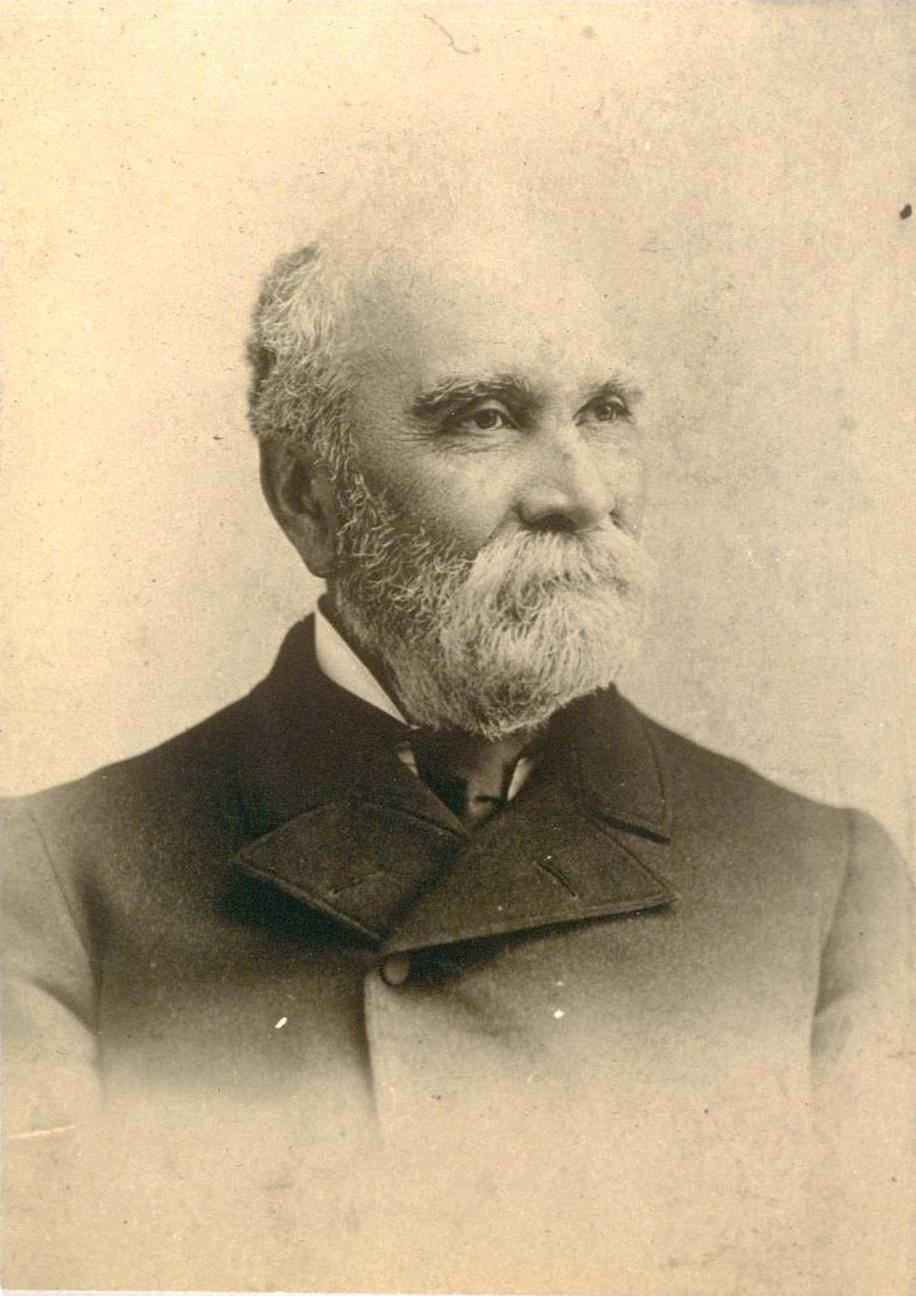
William Heath Davis in old age

William Heath "Kanaka" Davis Jr. (1822 – 1909) was a merchant and trader in Alta California who helped to establish "New Town" (now downtown San Diego) in San Diego, California.

== Life ==
Davis was born in 1822 in Honolulu in the Kingdom of Hawaiʻi to Captain William Heath Davis Sr., a Boston ship captain and pioneer of the Hawaii sandalwood trade, and Hannah Holmes Davis (1800-1847), a daughter of Oliver Holmes, who served as governor of Oahu. His nickname "Kanaka" refers to Davis's Hawaiian birth and blood; he was one-quarter Hawaiian from his maternal grandmother Mahi Kalanihooulumokuikekai, a high chiefess from the Koʻolau district of Oʻahu. His elder brother Robert Grimes Davis was a Hawaiian judge and politician.

Davis first visited California as a boy in 1831, then again in 1833 and 1838. The last time, he joined his uncle as a store clerk in Monterey and Yerba Buena (now San Francisco). He started a business in San Francisco and became a prominent merchant and ship owner.

In 1847 Davis married María de Jesus, daughter of José Joaquín Estudillo, grantee of Rancho San Leandro, and granddaughter of José María Estudillo. The Davises had at least one daughter, Anna Maria, born c. 1849. About the same time he moved to San Diego, which became part of the United States in 1850 via the admission of California to the union.

=== New Town San Diego ===
Davis was the original founder of New Town San Diego, an attempt to build a new community closer to San Diego Bay than the original Old Town San Diego, which was located below the Presidio of San Diego more than a mile from navigable water. The idea for New Town had originated with Lt. Andrew B. Gray, an American surveyor with the boundary commission which laid out the borders and boundaries of the new state of California. Gray's party camped near what is now H Street and he realized that this location near the natural harbor would be a much better location for a city. Davis agreed and recruited José Antonio Aguirre, Miguel Pedrorena, and William C. Ferrell as additional partners in the venture. The partners bought 160 acres (65 ha) of land and laid out streets, a large wharf, and a warehouse. The local residents referred to the project as New Town, Graytown (after Lt. Gray), and "Davis's Folly". The venture did not do well due to a lack of fresh water and hostility from the established settlements at Old Town and La Playa. The U.S. Army maintained a facility in the area for a time, eventually abandoning it during the American Civil War. Later, in 1867, the idea was revived by Alonzo Horton, who built a new subdivision just to the east of Davis's plot, which became a success. The area is now downtown San Diego, while the original settlement site is still referred to as Old Town.

Davis later wrote a memoir which was of great value to historians in understanding the early years of California and San Diego.

Davis eventually settled in San Leandro in financial straits. He died in Hayward, California, on April 19, 1909.

== Legacy ==
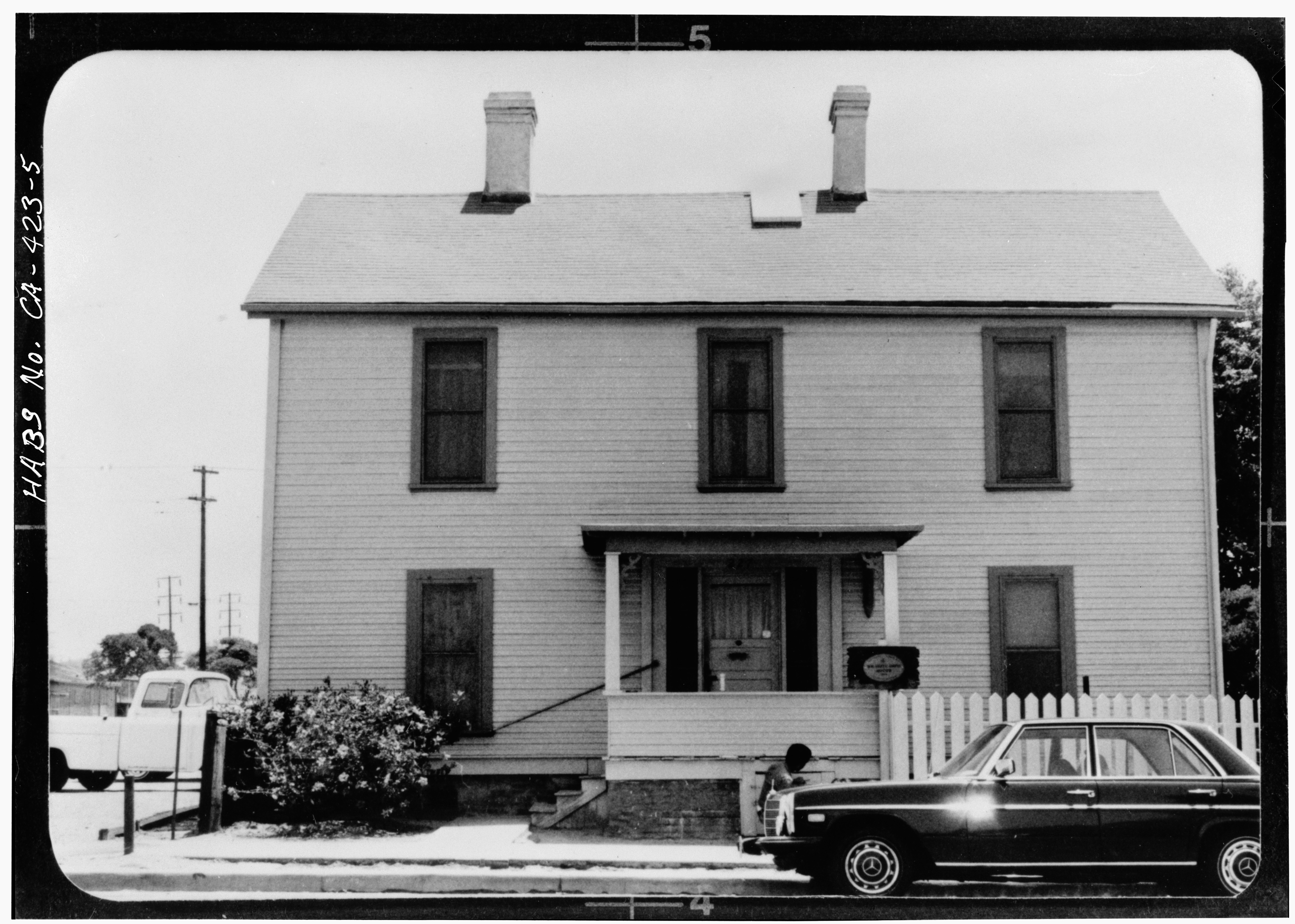
William Heath Davis House, 227 Eleventh Avenue, San Diego, San Diego County, CA HABS CAL,37-SANDI,2-5

The oldest building in New Town is the William Heath Davis House, a pre-fab "saltbox"-style home shipped from the east coast and built in 1850. It wasn't Davis's house, but of the same style and age of the Davis home that was on State and F Streets. The house is open to the public today as a museum at 410 Island Ave.

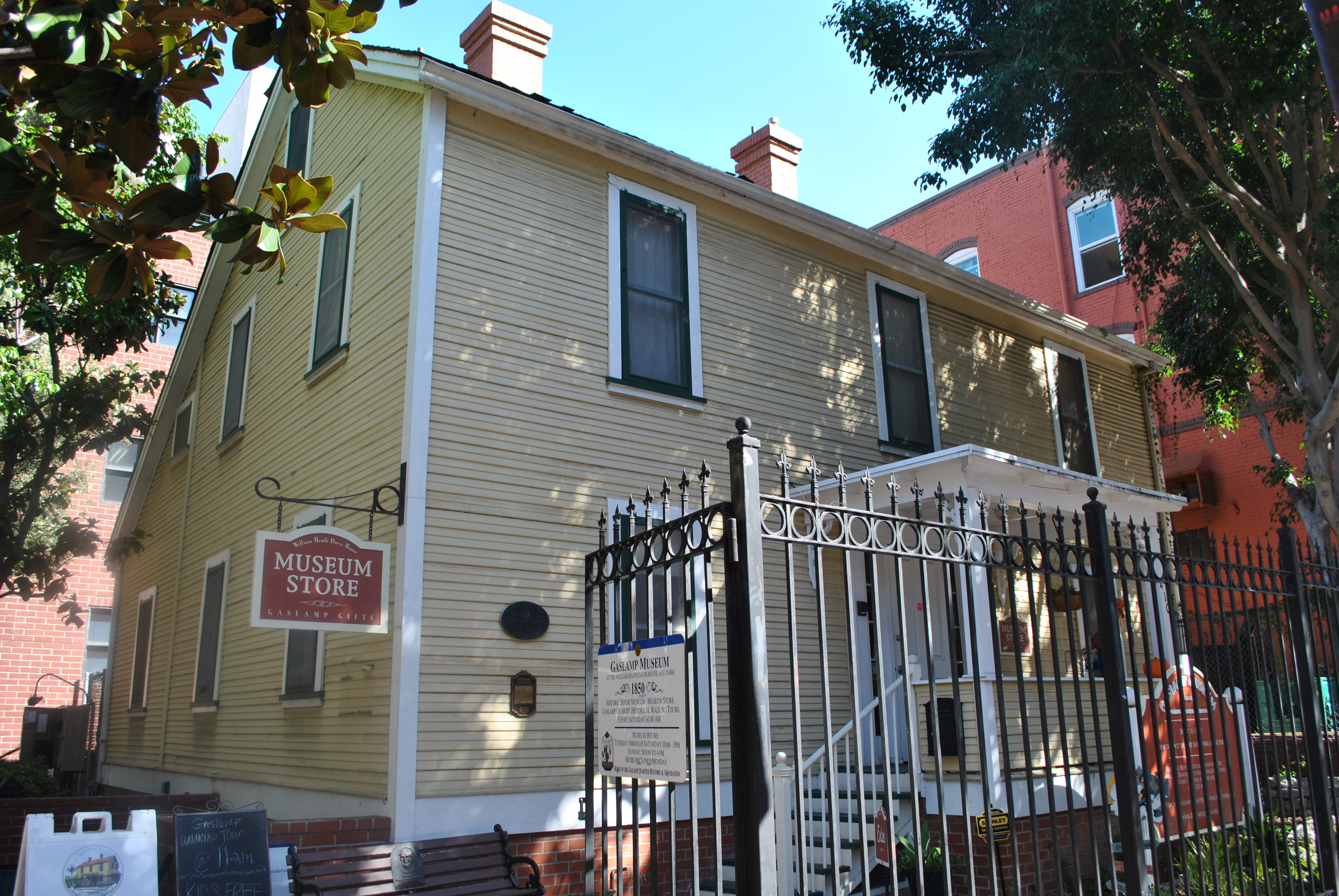
William Heath Davis House today

The original plaza for New Town is now Horton Plaza, but New Town Plaza, which still exists and is bounded by F, G, Columbia, and India Streets.
