= Hazel Wood Waterman =

American architect

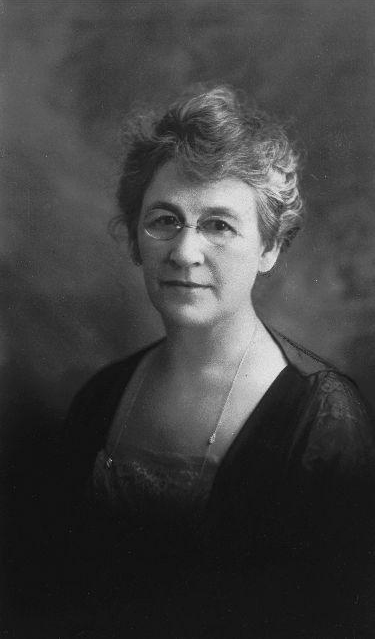
- Portrait of Hazel Wood Waterman in 1921.
- Born: Emma Hazel Wood; May 5, 1865; Tuskegee, Alabama, U.S.
- Died: July 22, 1948 (aged 83); Berkeley, California, U.S.
- Education: University of California, Berkeley
- Occupation: Architect
- Spouse: Waldo Sprague Waterman
- Children: Robert, Helen, Waldo
- Practice: Hebbard and Gill; Hazel Wood Waterman

Hazel Wood Waterman (1865–1948) was an early 20th-century American architect working in an Arts and Crafts—inspired style in Southern California. She undertook the first major renovation of the Casa de Estudillo, one of the oldest surviving examples of Spanish architecture in California.

== Personal life and education ==
Emma Hazel Wood was born on May 5, 1865, in Tuskegee, Alabama, to Rev. Jesse Wood (1839-1921), a minister in the Methodist Episcopal Church South and president of the Tuskegee Female College (est. 1854), and Alice Catherine Tison Wood (1844-1909).

In 1868, the Wood family moved to San Francisco before eventually settling in Chico, California, one of the richest agricultural regions in the world. The family also owned a ranch at Pentz, east of Oroville, in the foothills of the Sierra Nevada Mountains.

In 1882–83, Hazel enrolled in the University of California, Berkeley, where she took a partial course in history and political science. There, she met her future husband, Waldo Sprague Waterman, whose father Robert Waterman would become governor of California in 1887.

Hazel and Waldo married in April 1889, after which they moved to Cuyamaca, where Waldo supervised the Stonewall Mine on behalf of his father. In 1893, they moved to San Diego, where Waldo took over management of the Cuyamaca and Eastern Railway Co. The couple had three children: Robert Wood Waterman (1889-1973), Helen Gardner Waterman Kincade (1891-1954), and Waldo Dean Waterman (1894-1976). They were founding members of the College Graduate Club, now the University Club. In 1898, Hazel joined The Wednesday Club, a woman's club devoted to the exploration of artistic and literary culture.

In 1900, Hazel and Waldo hired the architectural firm of William S. Hebbard and Irving J. Gill to design their new home, "Granite Cottage," located at 237 West Hawthorne St. in Bankers Hill. The cottage was a Tudor-inspired building combining a granite lower story with a half-timbered upper story. Hazel helped to plan the room designs right down to details such as window frames. Gill was impressed with Hazel's ideas and thought she had a "natural talent" for architecture. Certainly she enjoyed the experience enough that she wrote an article about it in 1902 for House Beautiful magazine. It is clear from her description that she was strongly drawn to the American Craftsman aesthetic of natural materials and unornamented forms deployed to harmonize with the surrounding landscape. Like other women architects of the day, she paid special attention to labor-saving features.

Hazel's life changed dramatically in 1903, when Waldo died of pneumonia, leaving the family in difficult financial straits. Hazel started studying architectural drafting via a correspondence course offered by the International Correspondence School. Gill helped out by giving her lessons in perspective drawing at his office in off hours. In 1904, she was hired by Hebbard and Gill to do architectural drawings on cloth, and she was allowed to work at home. She also attended local lectures on the Arts and Crafts movement, and her own mature aesthetic would draw on both Gill's Prairie School—inspired modernism and the American Craftsman style.

== Career ==
After training with Gill, Waterman wanted to go out as an architect on her own, and Gill helped her to do this. Her first commission came in 1905 from two of his former clients, the San Diego socialite Alice Lee (after whom Theodore Roosevelt named his eldest daughter) and her companion Katherine Teats. Lee wanted Waterman to design a group of three houses near Balboa Park, and she asked Gill if he would serve as the architect of record on the project while having Waterman do the actual design work. Gill agreed to this and supported the inexperienced Waterman by supervising her work. Waterman sited the houses in a U shape, giving them a common garden that was designed by Kate Sessions. The Lee-Teats house was completed in the Prairie style, similar to Gill's other projects at this time.

In 1906, Waterman opened her own office, though she retained close ties to Gill throughout her career. For the first five years or so, she mainly designed Arts and Crafts style residences, many of them expressing her preference for designs that blended indoors with outdoors. In 1911, she received her first non-residential commission, a new building for the Wednesday Club of San Diego (of which she was a longstanding member). For this building, she extended her style to include elements—especially stucco—paying homage to the region's Spanish architecture.

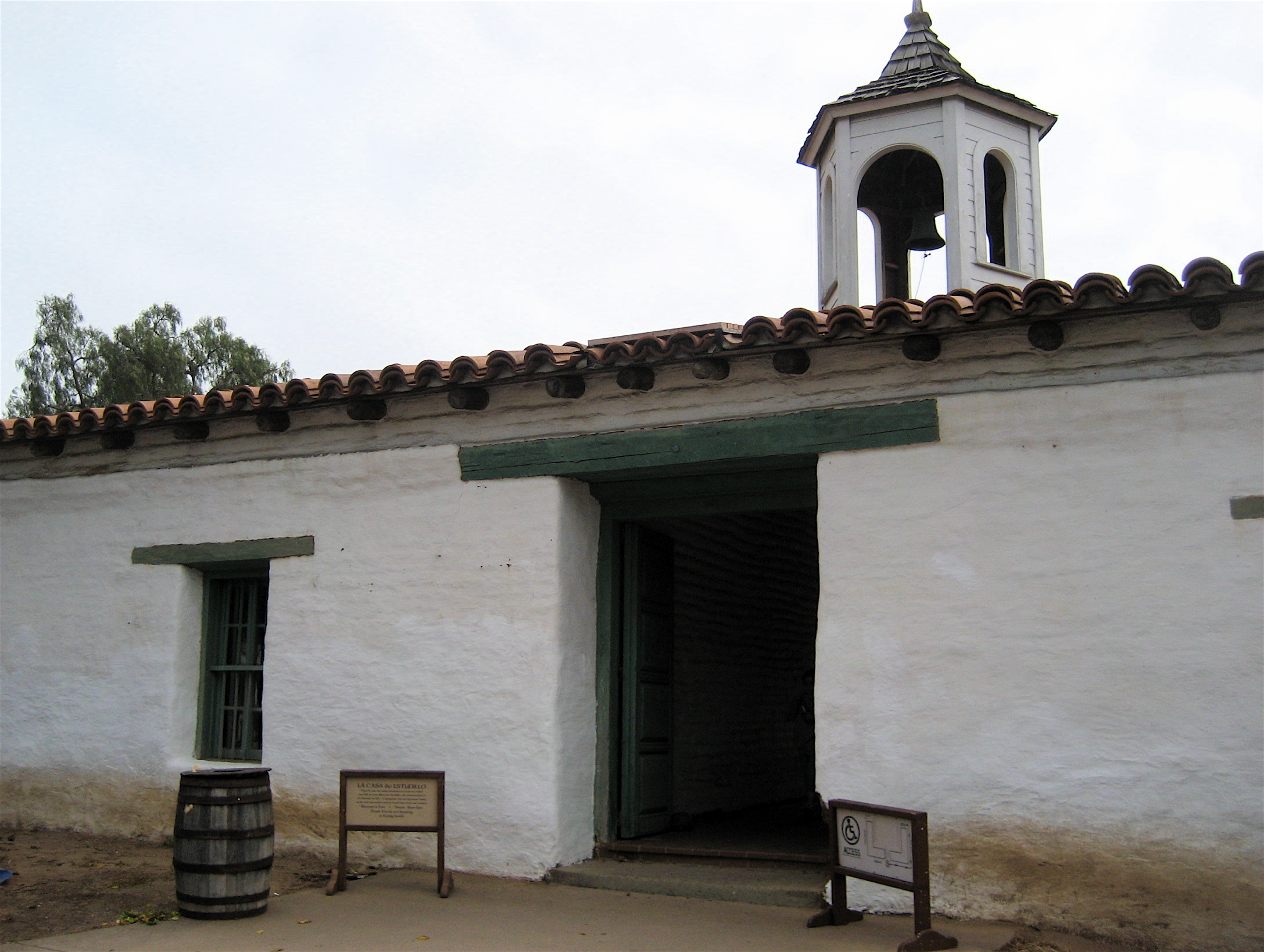
Casa de Estudillo - main entrance

Waterman's most famous solo commission came in 1910 from businessman John D. Spreckels to restore Estudillo House in Old Town, San Diego. Estudillo House was one of the oldest surviving examples of Spanish Colonial architecture in California, and it had gained some national fame a generation earlier by being associated with Helen Hunt Jackson's 1884 bestseller Ramona. Waterman worked with historical records in determining what materials should be used in the restoration and what the final plan of the rooms and gardens should be, while also trying to satisfy Spreckels's desire for a renovation that would make it easier to market the site as a Ramona-themed attraction. Her role in this restoration was recognized when Estudillo House was documented by the Historic American Buildings Survey of 1937.

Waterman also received a commission from the Children's Home in Balboa Park, and she designed a garden for Julius Wangenheim that in 1933 would be awarded a Certificate of Honor by the American Institute of Architects. She was able to employ several draftspeople over the years, including Lilian Rice and her own daughter, Helen. She collaborated with local designers and artists such as tile maker Ernest A. Batchelder. Her breadth of design interests showed in frequent papers she gave on diverse subjects to the Wednesday Club.

Waterman took a break from architecture between 1915 and 1920, and seems to have stopped practicing architecture altogether in 1929. She retired in Berkeley, California, where she died on July 22, 1948. Her papers are held by the San Diego History Center.

== Works ==
Name	Year	Other Information	Image
Alice Lee and Katherine Teats Houses, Seventh Ave.	1905	Designed under the supervision of architect Irving J. Gill	
Cottage for Miss Alice Pratt	1906	Pratt was a faculty member at San Diego Normal School	
Cottage for Anna (Mrs. George) Barney	1907		
William and Augusta Clayton Residence	1907	Alteration for 3rd floor, 1909	
Residence for Mrs. Sarah Jenness Smith and Miss Elizabeth Freese	1908-09		
Estudillo House Restoration	1909		
The Wednesday Club	1911		
Captain Albert and Mrs. Lucy Ackerman Residence	1912		
Children's Home, Cottage for Babies, Balboa Park	1912		
Cottage for Mittie J. Churcher, La Jolla	ca. 1914-15		
Garden for Julius and Laura Wangenheim	1917		
Alterations for Dr. & Mrs. H.G. Leisenring Residence	ca. 1920		
Shop building for Lucy Newark	ca. 1923		
Children's Home, Administration Building, Balboa Park	1924-25		
Assisted Helen Waterman Kincade, Palos Verdes	1928		
Judge Walton J. Wood Residences, Hermosa Beach and Pasadena	1929		
Cottage for Waldo Dean Waterman	1929		

== Publications ==
A list of written articles published by Waterman about her architectural works.

Article Title	Publication Name	Volume Number	Issue Number	Year	Page Numbers	Other Information	Image
A Granite Cottage in California	The House Beautiful magazine	11	4	March 1902	245 - 250		
On My Friend’s Porch	The House Beautiful magazine	12	4	September 1902	220 - 222		
The Influence of an Olden Time	The House Beautiful magazine	14	1	June 1903	3 - 9		
Views Alone Worth A Visit	Los Angeles Times			March 1910			
Wednesday Club, San Diego, California	The Western Architect	19	3	March 1913	27 - 28		
A City Garden in Southern California, Possessing the Charm of Adaptability to the Out-Of-Door Habits of Life	House and Garden magazine	38	2	August 1920	54 - 55, 82		
The Figure of the House	The Federation	7	11	1921	1 - 5		
The Berkeley Woman's City Club	The Covered Wagon, ed. Moton Holt	4	1	Autumn 1944	5-7		
