= Casa de Estudillo =

Historic house museum in San Diego, California

- Estudillo House
- U.S. National Register of Historic Places
- U.S. National Historic Landmark
- California Historical Landmark
- San Diego Historic Landmark
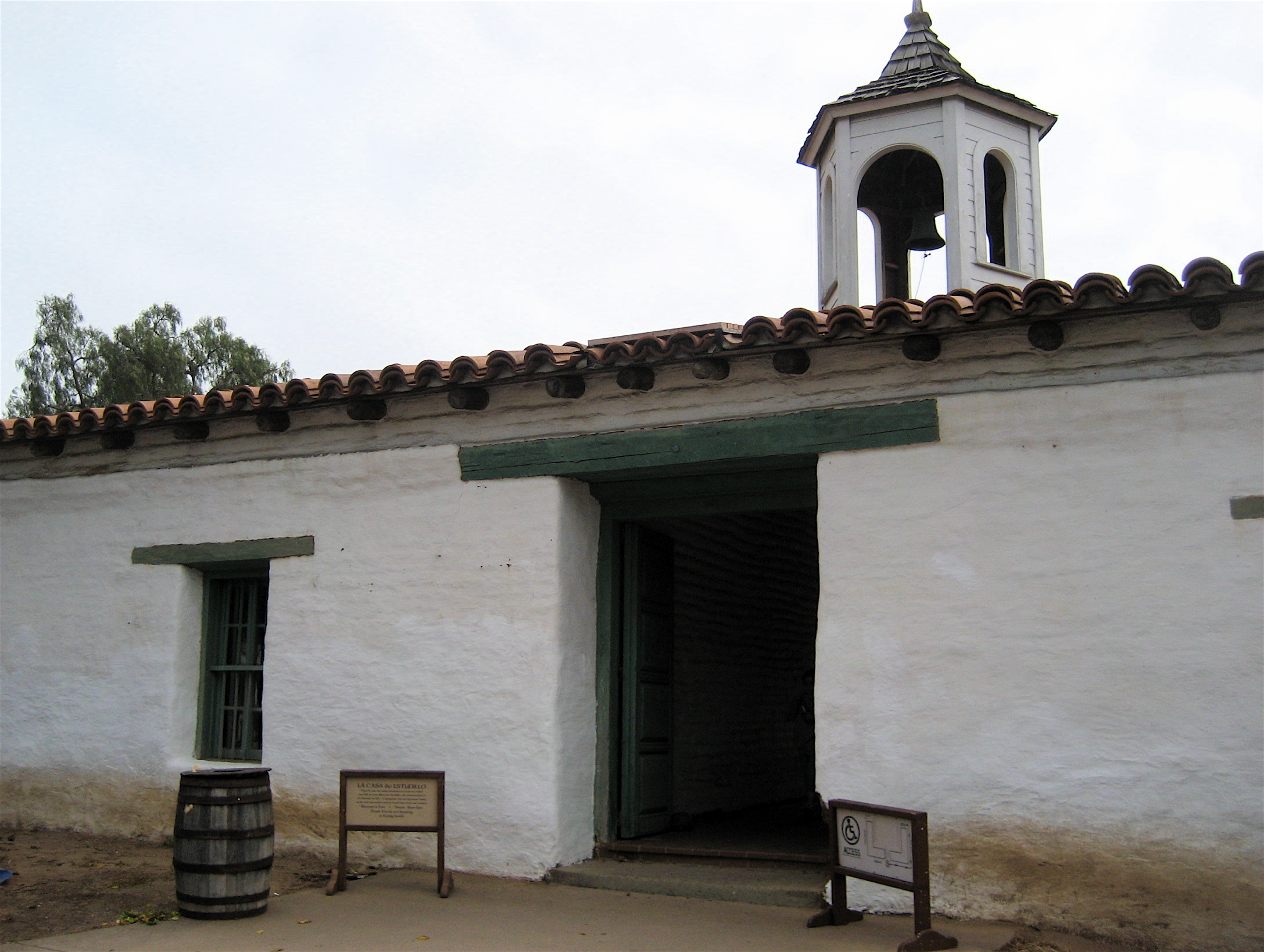
- Main entrance

- Location within San Diego Location within San Diego County, California Location within California Location within the United States
- Location: 4000 Mason Street, San Diego, California
- Coordinates: 32°45′14.32″N 117°11′44.81″W
- Built: 1827
- Architectural style: Spanish Colonial
- NRHP reference No.: 70000143
- CHISL No.: 53
- SDHL No.: 14A

Significant dates
- Added to NRHP: April 15, 1970
- Designated NHL: April 15, 1970
- Designated CHISL: 1932
- Designated SDHL: November 6, 1970

The Casa de Estudillo, also known as the Estudillo House, is a historic adobe house in San Diego, California, United States. It was constructed in 1827 by José María Estudillo and his son José Antonio Estudillo, early settlers of San Diego and members of the prominent Estudillo family of California, and was considered one of the finest houses in Mexican California. It is located in Old Town San Diego State Historic Park, and is designated as both a National and a California Historical Landmark in its own right.

Besides being one of the oldest surviving examples of Spanish architecture in California, the house gained much prominence by association with Helen Hunt Jackson's wildly popular 1884 novel Ramona. The Casa de Estudillo is one of three National Historic Landmarks in Southern California that were closely tied to Ramona, a novel of Californio life shortly after the American acquisition of California; the other two are Rancho Camulos and Rancho Guajome.

== Description ==
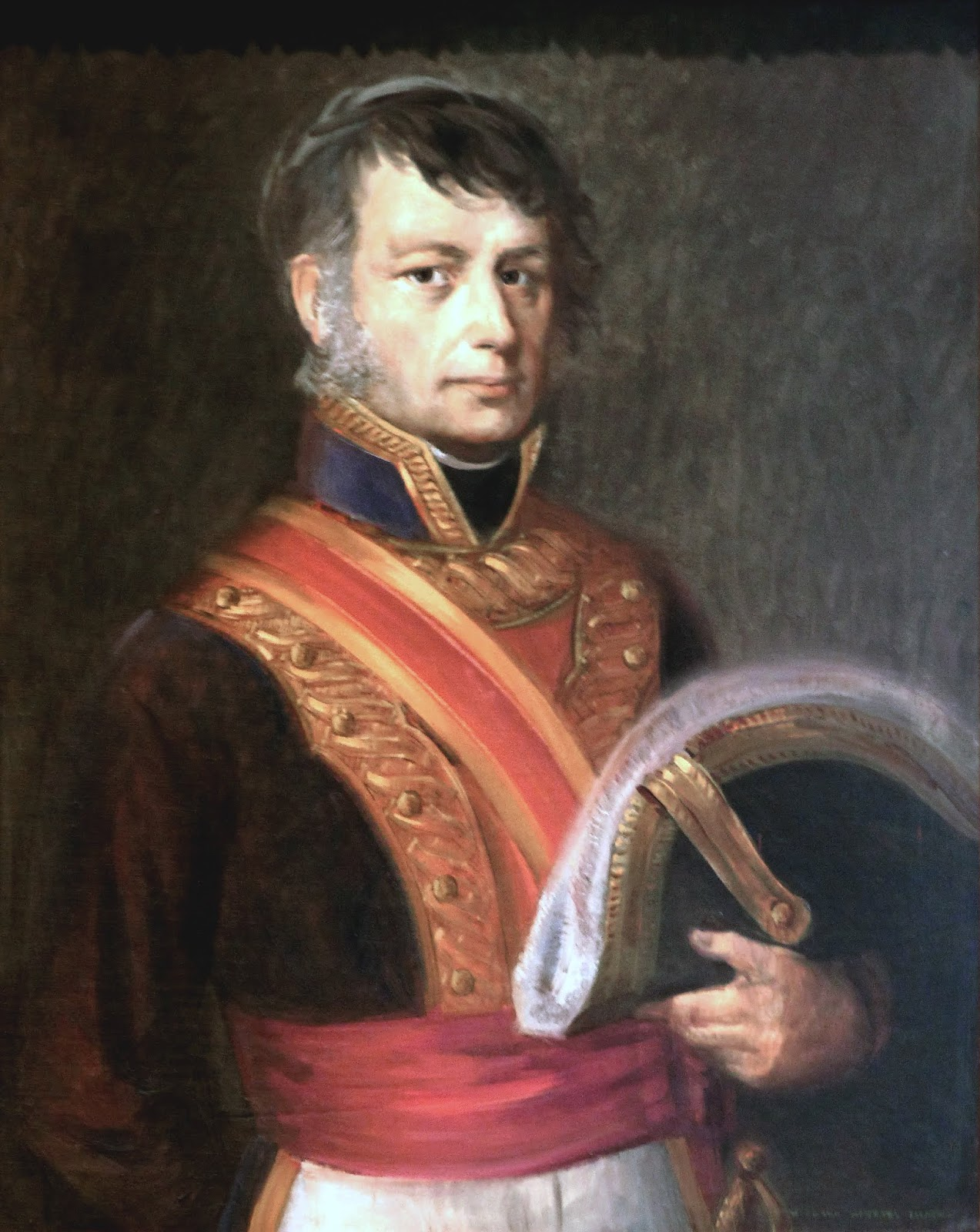
Californio soldier and explorer José María Estudillo and several generations of the Estudillo family of California called the adobe home.

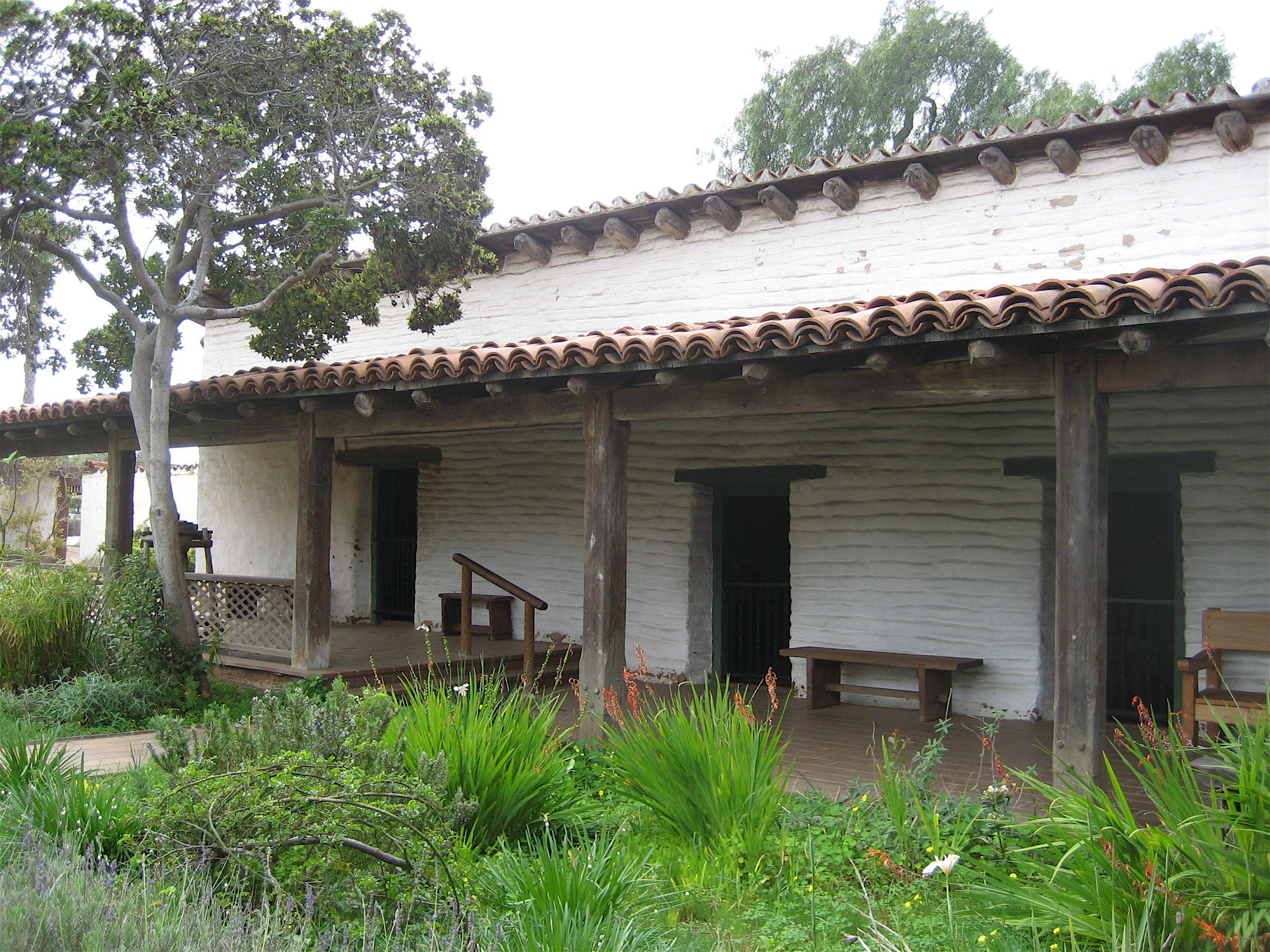
One wing of the house, with rooms connected by an exterior corredor

The large building is a U-shaped structure, measuring 113 feet (34.4 m) on the front side, and 98 feet (29.9 m) on each of the wings. It is constructed in the Spanish Colonial style, meaning that the house's 13 rooms are set consecutively in the building and connected only by an external covered corredor (as opposed to an interior hallway).

The main portion (the center) contains the entrance, facing west. To its left is the chapel and to its right is the schoolroom. Both rooms originally were smaller, with bedrooms located at the ends of building, but a 1910 restoration eliminated those walls to enlarge the rooms. Two bedrooms, a living room, a kitchen (which was added at a later date), and the servants' dining room are in the north wing, while the south wing has three bedrooms and the family dining room. The house is topped by a cupola from which bullfights and festivals in the adjacent plaza could be seen.

== Ramona ==
=== Association with the novel ===
José Antonio Estudillo died in 1852, and his family stayed until 1887, when they moved to Los Angeles, leaving the house in the hands of a caretaker. Meanwhile, the 1884 publication of Ramona, a novel set in Southern California which painted a romanticized portrait of Californio life, generated a nationwide interest in the region. This, combined with the opening of the Southern Pacific and Santa Fe Railway lines (and the ensuing rate war, which drove prices down to as low as $1 from St. Louis, Missouri to Los Angeles), meant that hordes of tourists made their way to Southern California to see the locations in the novel. Unfortunately, Jackson died in 1885 without ever having disclosed what the actual locations in the novel were, which caused a great deal of speculation.

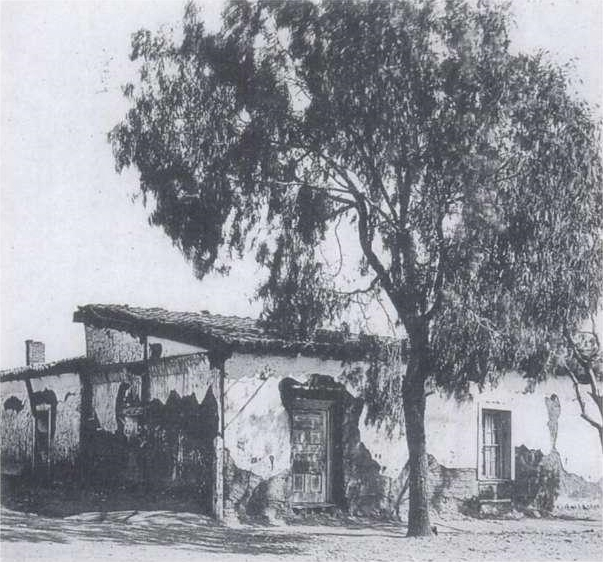
The dilapidated Casa de Estudillo, circa 1890, after the caretaker had sold off bits of the building.

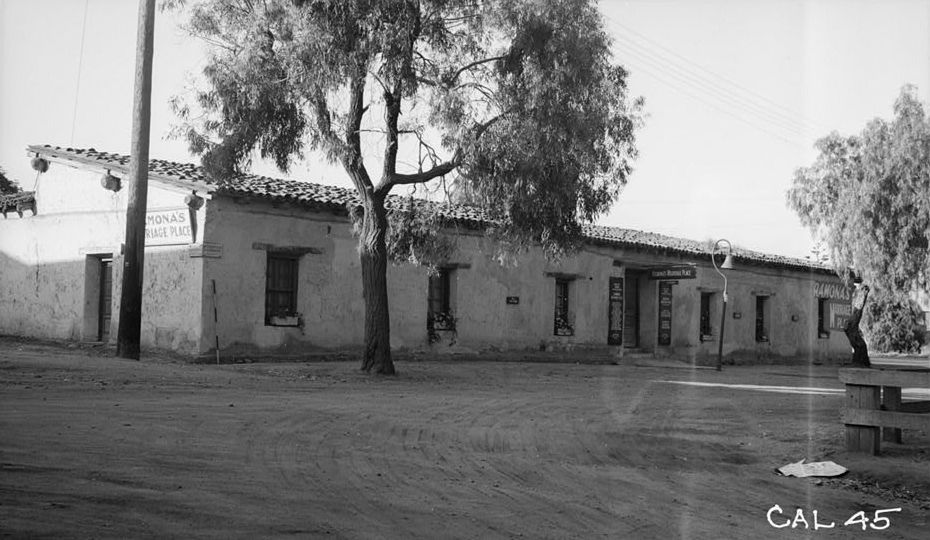
In 1937, with "Ramona's Marriage Place" prominently visible. Note the missing cupola.

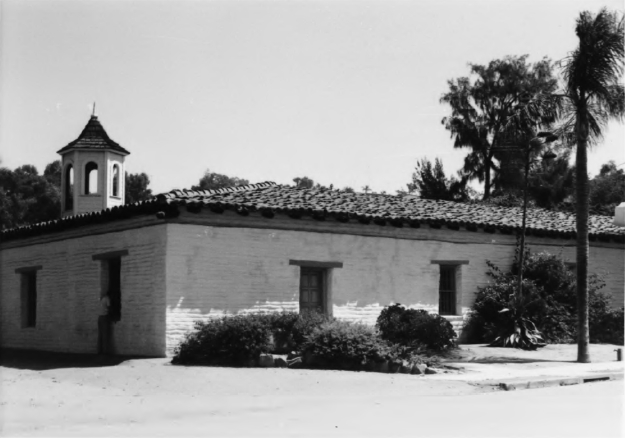
In 1975 (same view as above), with the cupola restored and "Ramona's Marriage Place" signage removed.

In 1887, a front-page article of the San Diego Union declared the Estudillo home to be "Ramona's Marriage Place", saying, "To sleepy Old Town (the house) is known as the Estudillos, but the outside world knows it as the marriage place of 'Ramona.'" This was despite Jackson never having visited the house, but in the novel, Ramona was married in a "long, low adobe building which had served no mean purpose in the old Presidio days, but was now fallen in decay; and all its rooms, except those occupied by the Father, had been long uninhabited". Despite the novel being a work of fiction, visitors flocked to the building thinking it was the actual location of Ramona's marriage. To be clear, the Union did not simply invent this story; a tourist had already scratched the name "Alessandro" (Ramona's husband in the novel) in one of the walls. The caretaker decided to capitalize on the attendant publicity and began selling off pieces of the house as souvenirs. Naturally, the building's condition began to deteriorate rapidly.

=== 1910 restoration ===
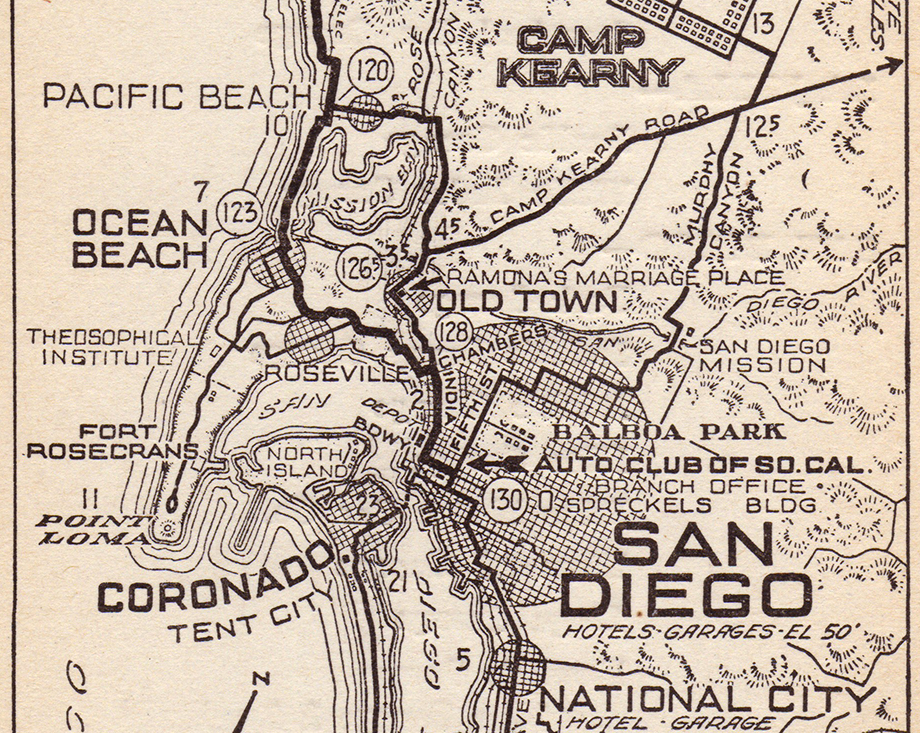
Clip from the 1920 Automobile Club of Southern California map No. 482, showing Casa de Estudillo as "Ramona's Marriage Place" in Old Town

In 1906, the dilapidated building was purchased by the San Diego Electric Railway Company, owned by prominent San Diego citizen John D. Spreckels (who also owned the Union). In his vision, the house would anchor several tourist attractions connected via his railway which would realize his twin goals of developing San Diego into a popular locale and generate revenue for his company. To this end, he hired architect Hazel Wood Waterman to renovate the house to a condition more closely matching the descriptions in the novel. The original cupola and balcony were removed because there was none mentioned in the novel, and several doors and windows were moved. Waterman was exacting in her specifications: She wanted the building to look aged as well as have the "charm of the work of half-skilled Indian hands", although modern conveniences such as electricity and indoor plumbing were included. Upon its completion in 1910, it was marketed as a Ramona-related tourist attraction, and remained popular as such for years to come, drawing 1,632 visitors on one day in 1940.

Spreckels hired Tommy Getz, a theater showman, to manage the property, and it was under Getz's guidance that the property truly gained its Ramona association. He began strongly marketing the property: Tchotchkes of all sorts were labeled with "Ramona's Marriage Place", and more postcards were printed for the adobe than any other Ramona attraction. Due to its association with Ramona's marriage, the house was used to host weddings as well. Getz eventually purchased the adobe from Spreckels in 1924.

The association with the novel was so keen that the application for National Historic Landmark status was entitled, "Casa Estudillo/Ramona's Marriage Place." One author goes so far as to say that without the novel's influence and the popularity of the house, the historic buildings that make up Old Town San Diego would have been razed. In fact, for a time, the Estudillos' relationship to the house was nearly forgotten.

After Getz's death in 1934, his daughter Margeurite Weiss continued to operate the business for another thirty years, finally selling it in 1964 to the Title Insurance and Trust Company, which then sold it to local businessman Legler Benbough, who donated it to the State of California in 1968.

=== 1968 restoration ===
Casa de Estudillo floor plan

The state Park Service then set about restoring it to its pre-Ramona state, including the missing cupola. The house now stands as a museum and is furnished as it would likely have been during Estudillo's ownership, but with an added kitchen. The state seemed embarrassed at the property's association with the novel: The long-standing "Ramona's Marriage Place" sign was removed, and brochures printed in the 1970s make no mention of the novel at all. By the 1990s, the state began to acknowledge the long-standing relationship to the book.

Ramona no longer has the same hold on the country's imagination as it once did. It is estimated that only 1% of visitors to the Casa de Estudillo now are aware of the house's ties to the novel.

== Photo gallery ==
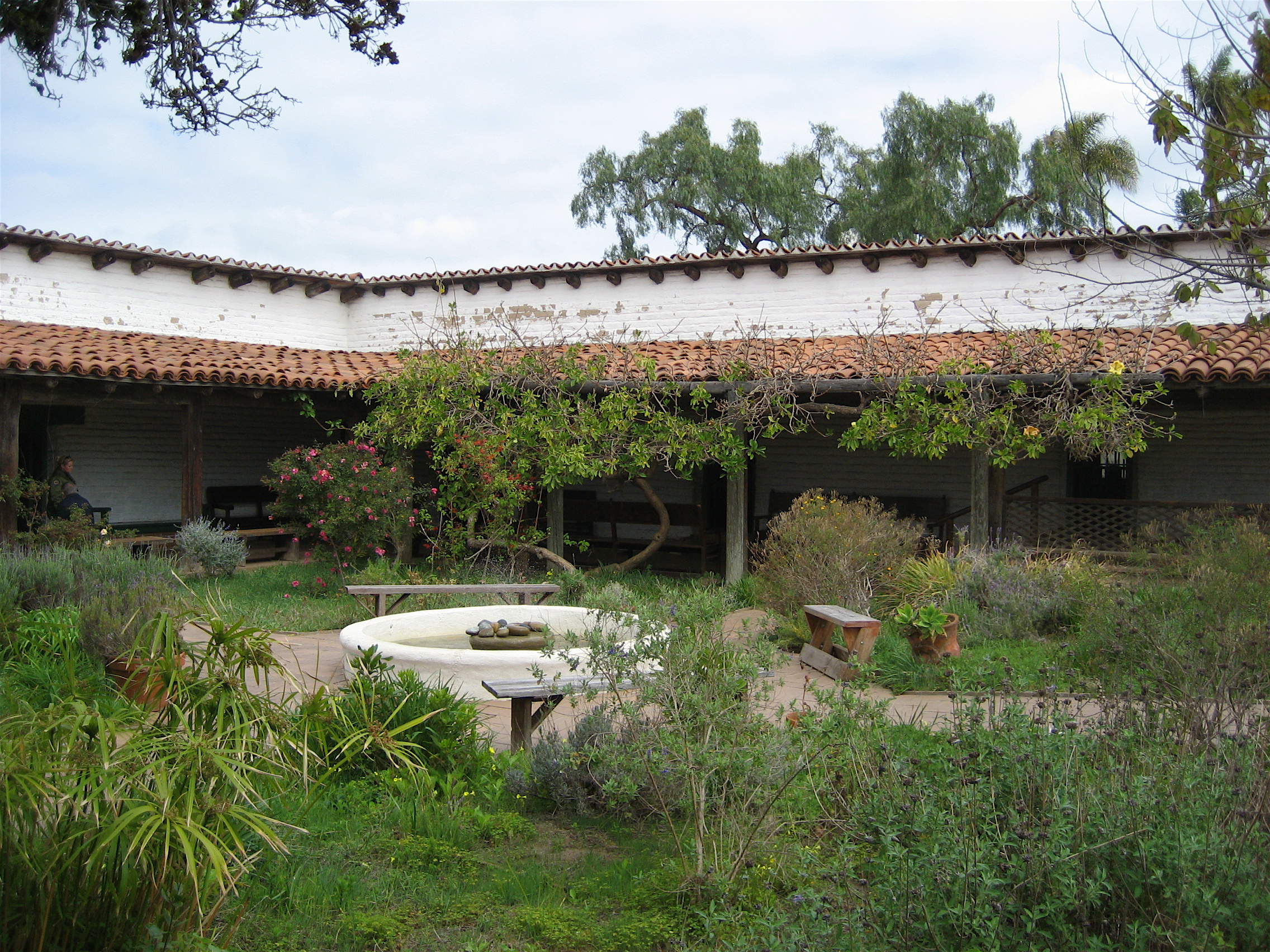
Inner courtyard

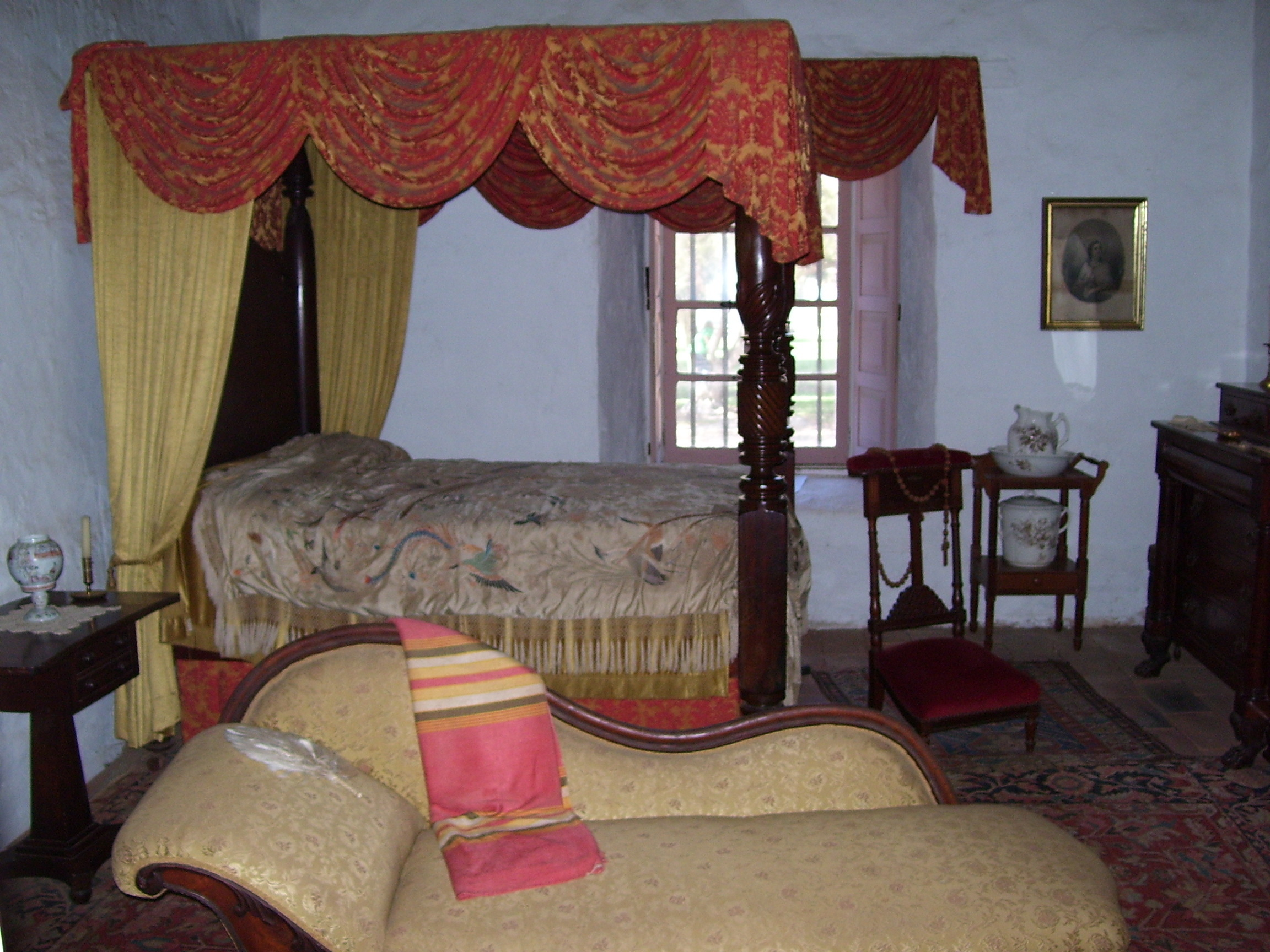
The main bedroom had some of the nicest furnishings. The canopy on the bed helped to retain the heat as well as to keep pests off that may have fallen from above.

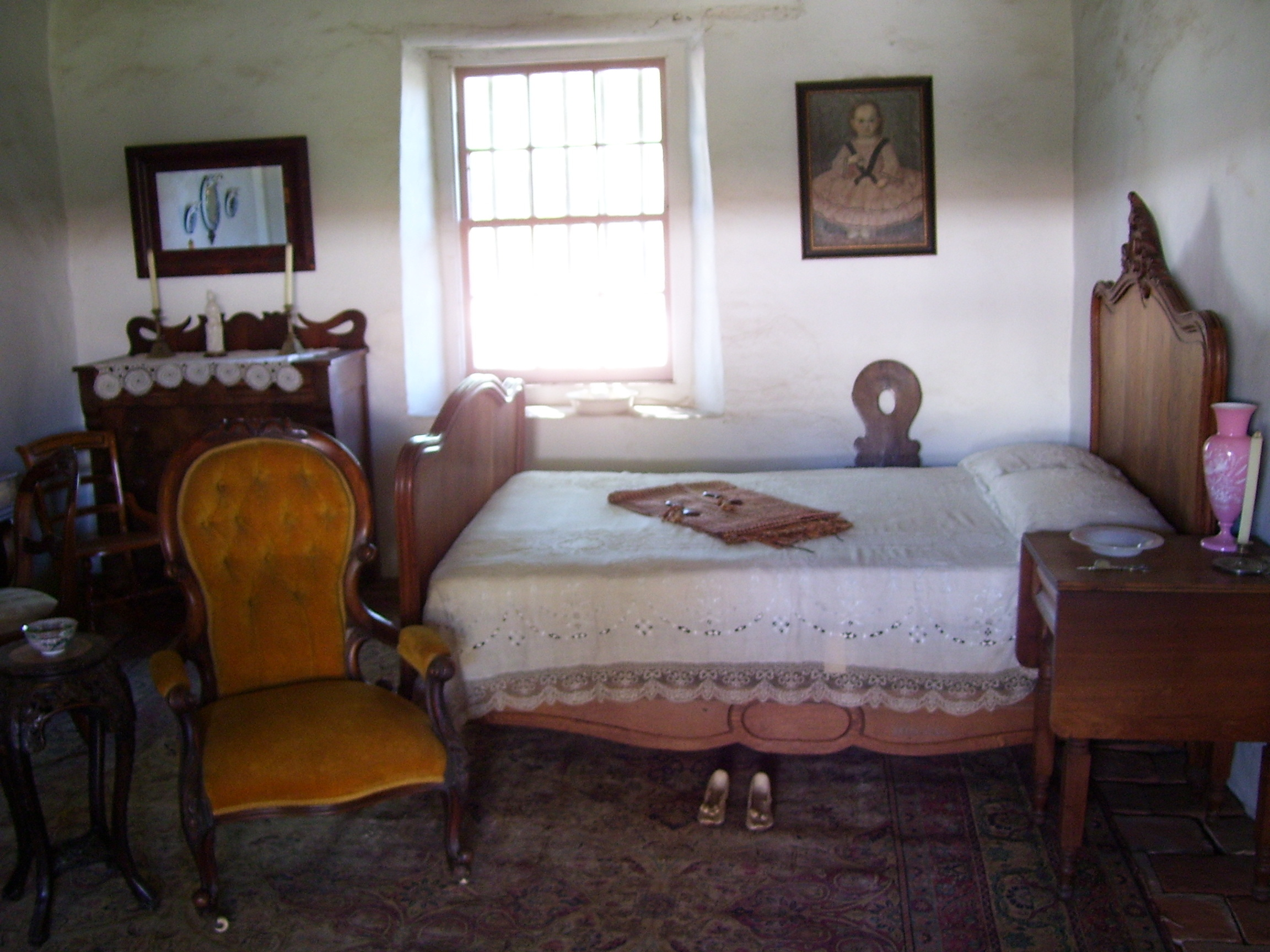
At the time, many families in Alta California intermarried, and it was quite common for newlyweds to live with one of their in-laws. La Casa de Estudillo has many rooms such as this.

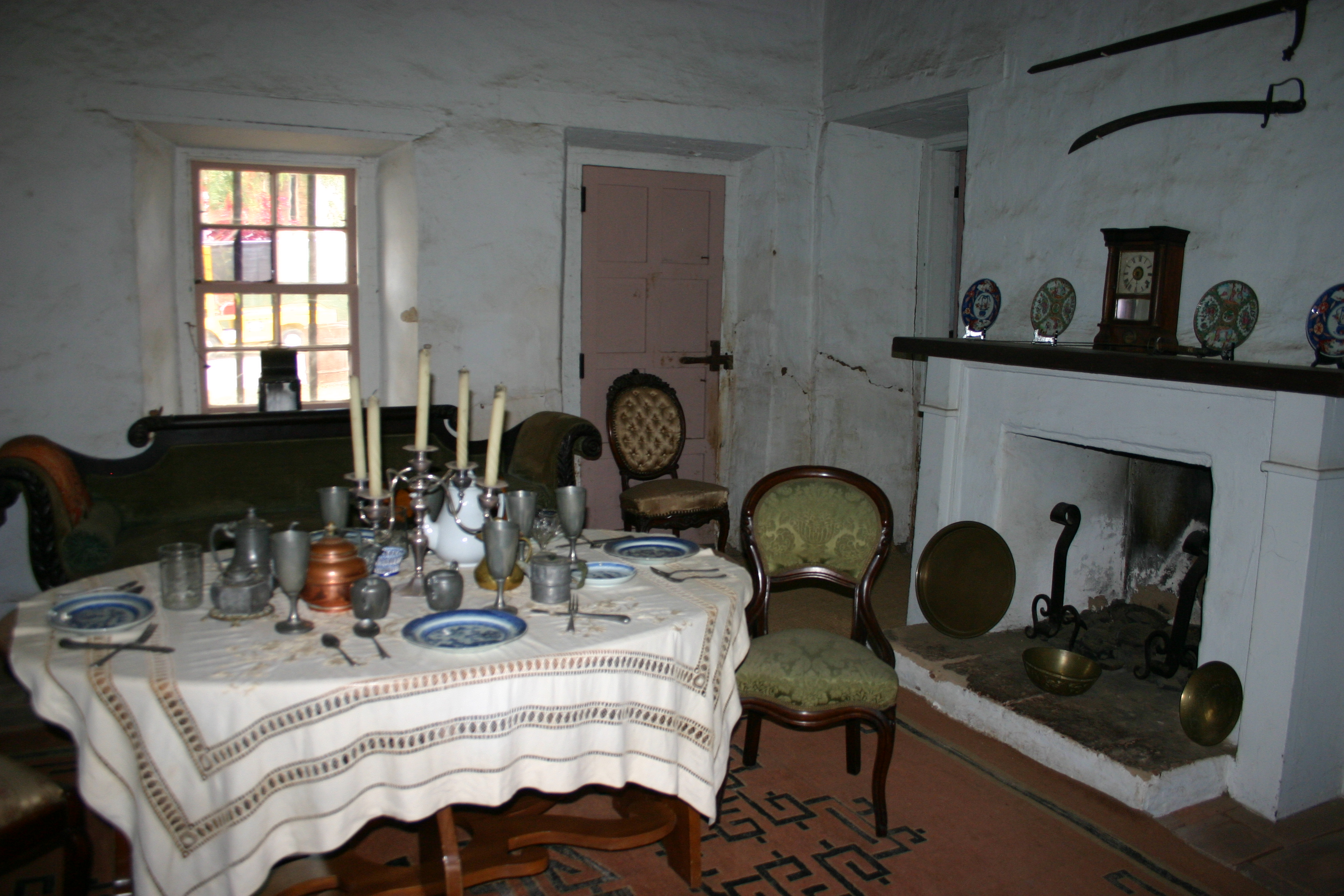
Dining room

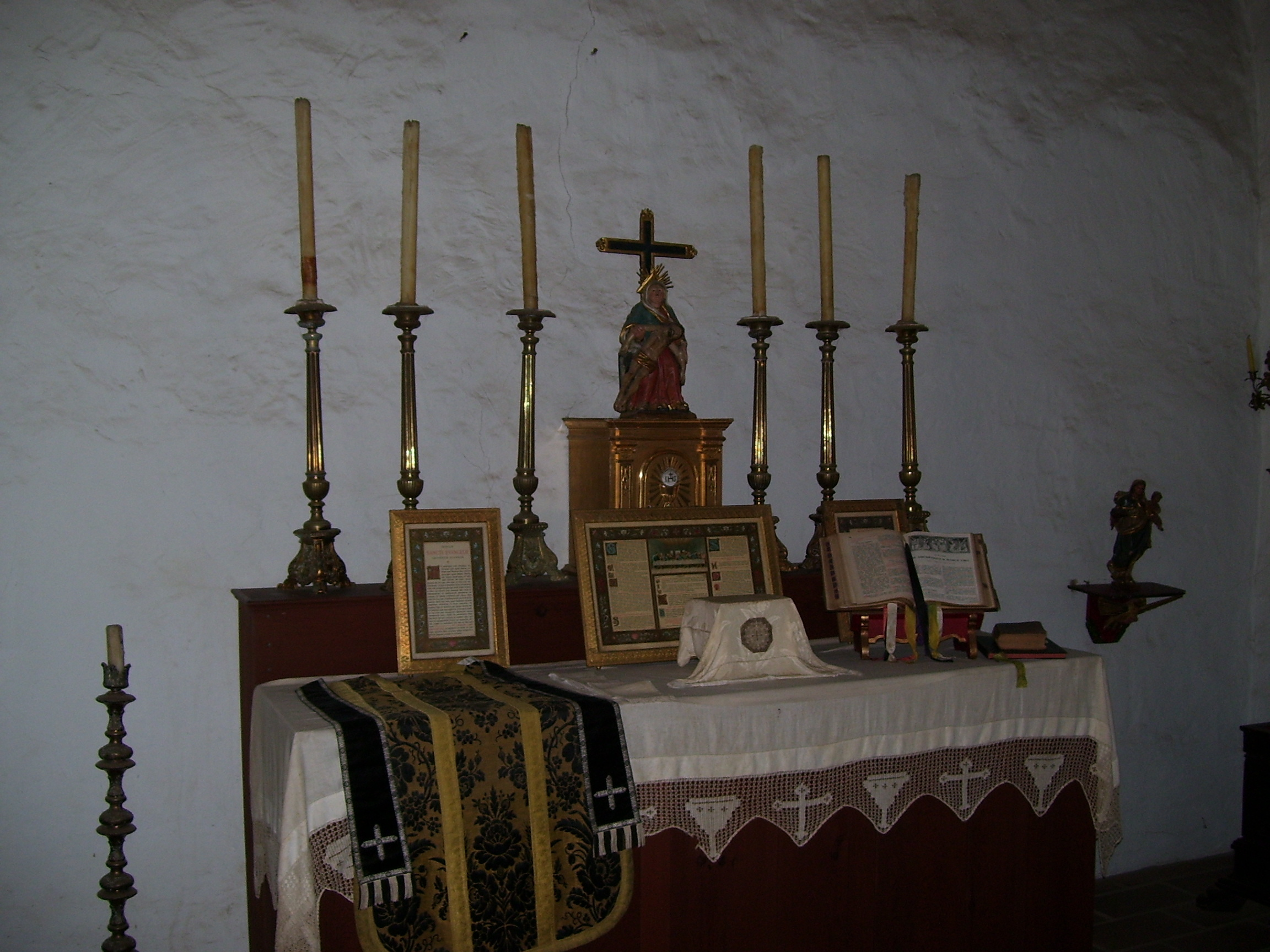
One of the rooms was turned into a temporary chapel for religious services.

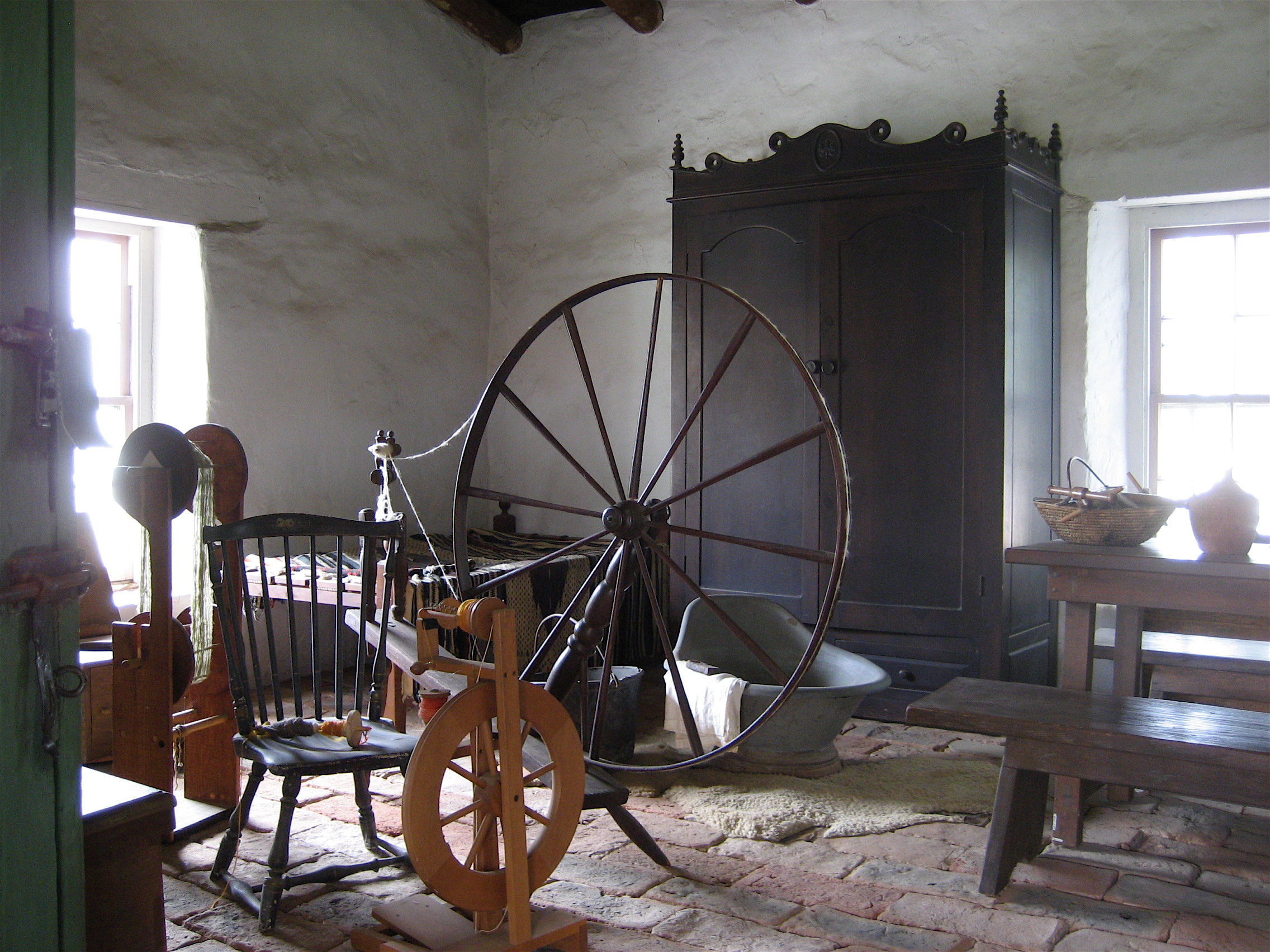
Spinning wheel

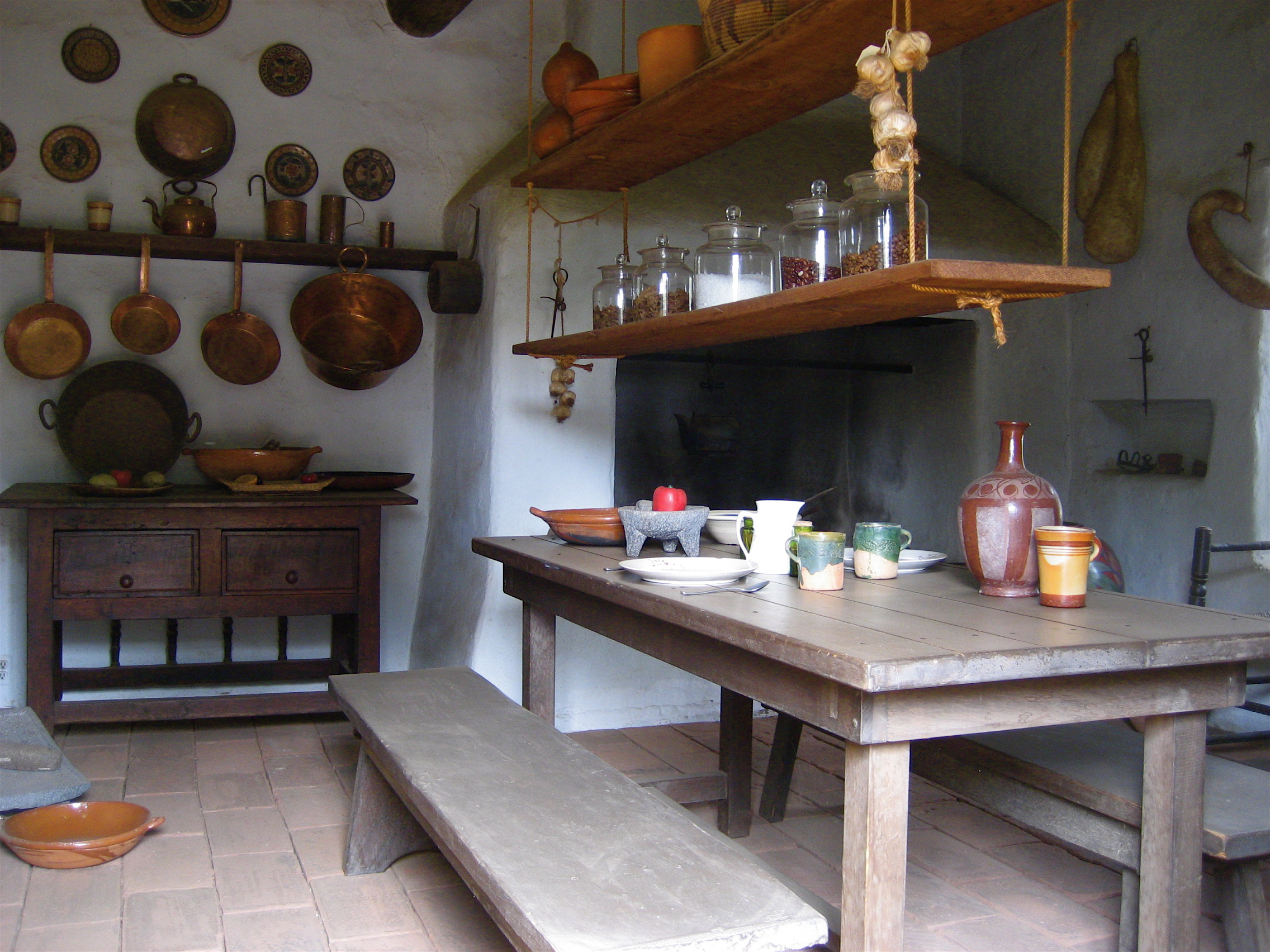
Kitchen—this was not included in the original design, which likely would have had an exterior cocina

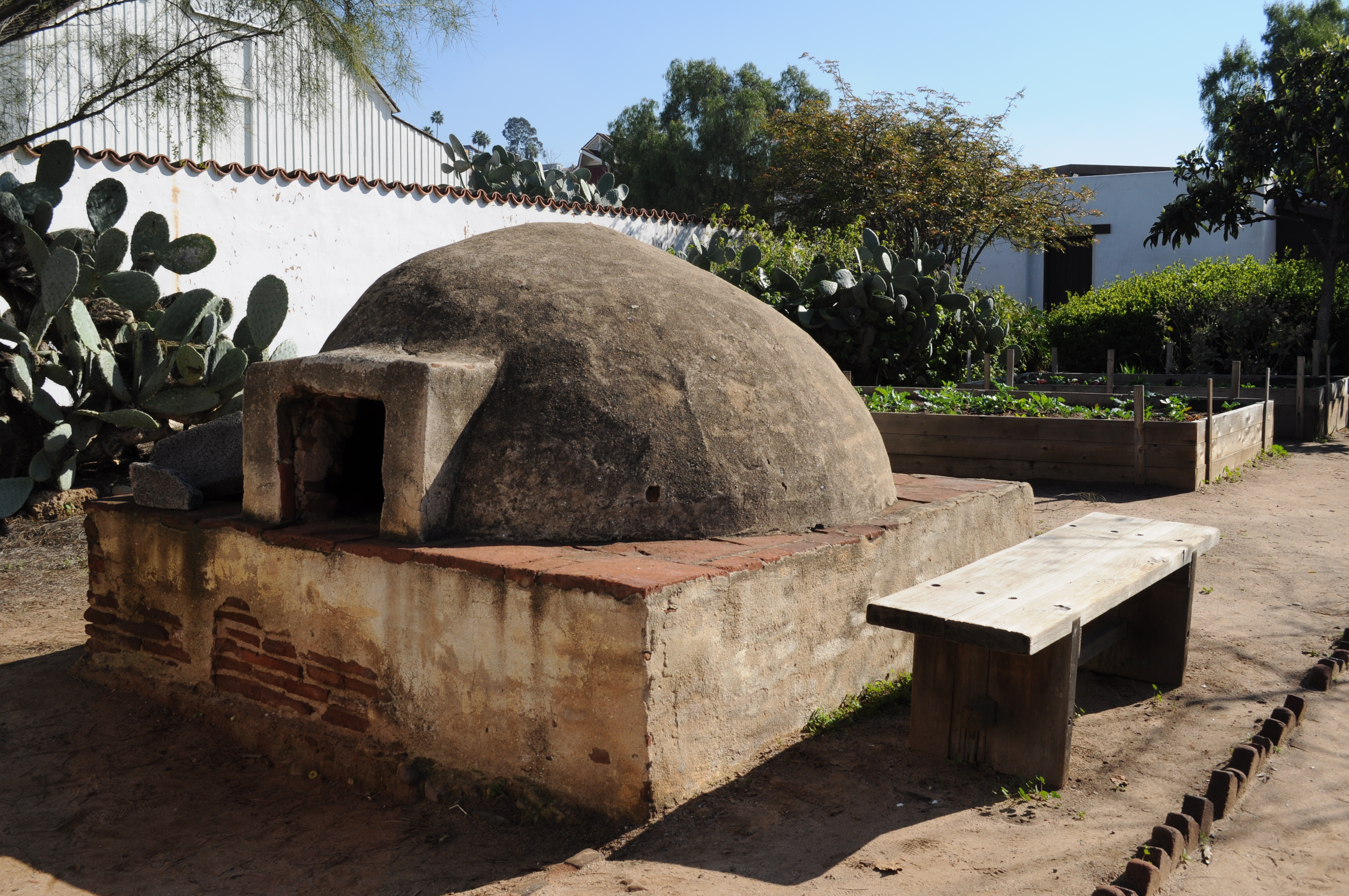
Outdoor oven

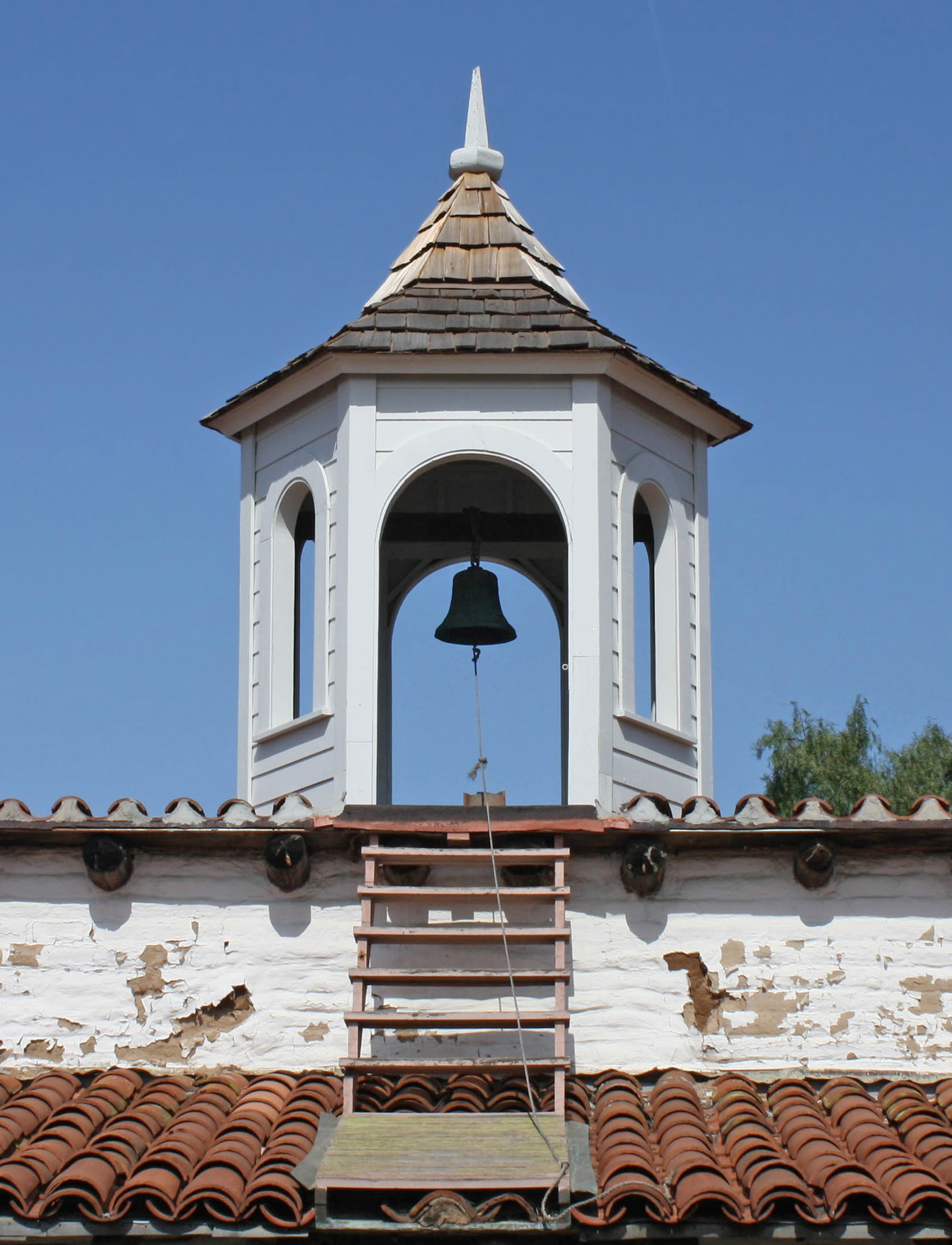
The bell tower
