= José Joaquín Estudillo =

Californio statesman (1800–1852)

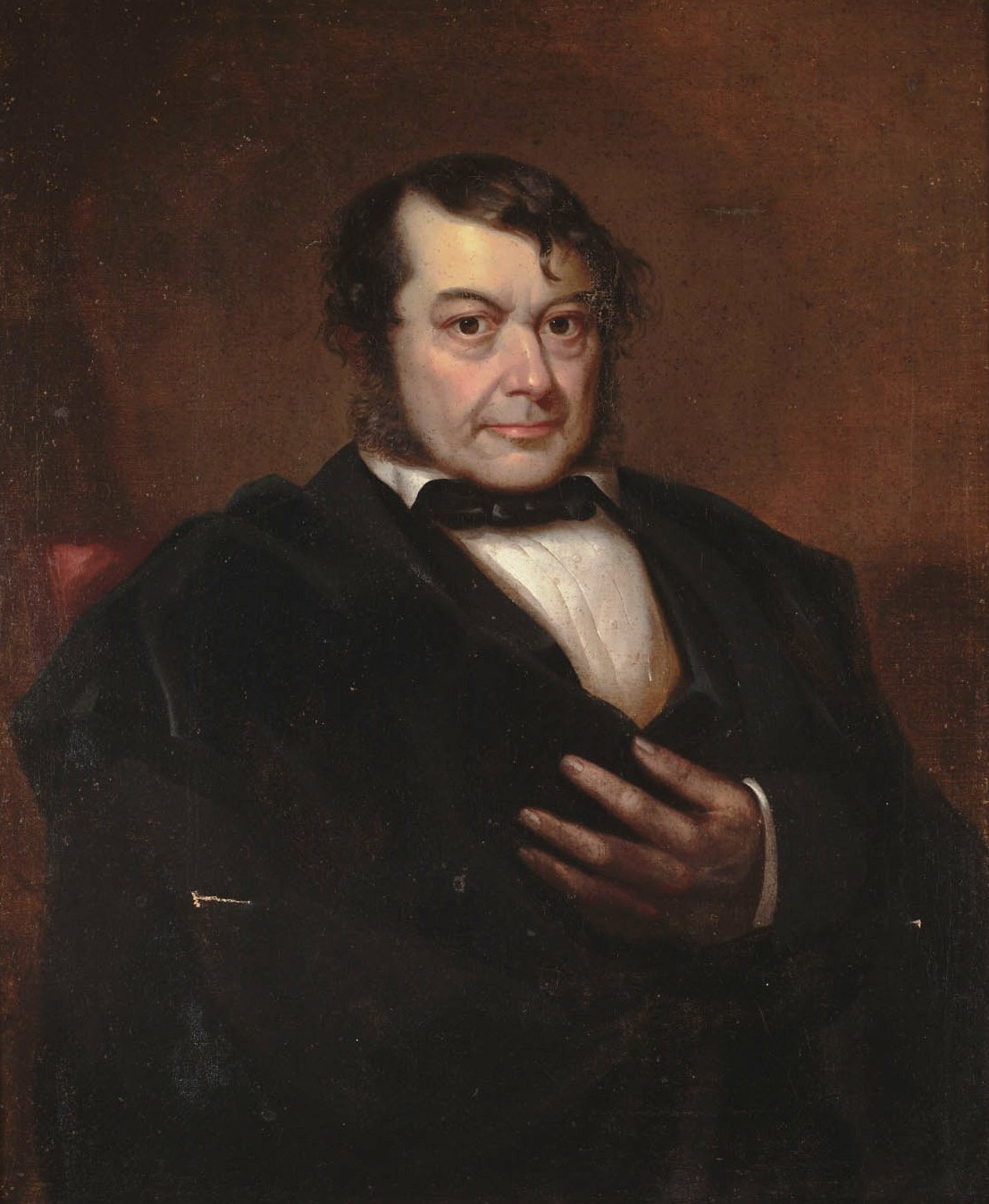

2nd Alcalde of San Francisco
- In office 1835–1836
- Preceded by: Francisco de Haro
- Succeeded by: Francisco Guerrero y Palomares

Personal details
- Born: 7 May 1800 Monterey
- Died: 7 June 1852 (aged 52) San Leandro
- Resting place: Mission Dolores

José Joaquín Estudillo (May 7, 1800 – June 7, 1852) was a Californio statesman and ranchero who served as the 2nd Alcalde of San Francisco (then known as Yerba Buena). A member of the prominent Estudillo family of California, he is also considered the founder of the city of San Leandro.

== Biography ==
He was born at the Presidio of Monterey, to José María Estudillo, a Spanish soldier; his brother José Antonio Estudillo also played an important role in the settling of California. José Joaquín joined the Spanish Army himself at the age of 15 as a soldado distinguido ("distinguished soldier") at the Monterey Presidio. It is unclear when he moved to Yerba Buena, but records indicate that he was the commissioner in charge of the secularization of Mission San Francisco de Asís at the beginning of 1835. In July that year he petitioned the alcalde, Francisco de Haro, for a land grant in that area. Haro forwarded the request to Governor José Figueroa, who denied the request on the grounds that the ayuntamiento (Town Hall) attached to the Mission did not have the authority to grant such requests. The governor reversed himself a few months later in September, however, stating that a building-lot could be granted to Estudillo, provided it was not within two hundred varas (yards) of the beach, and that other persons might obtain grants of the same kind and establish themselves there, although no records exist to show that Estudillo did receive such a grant afterwards. In November 1835, he was elected alcalde of Yerba Buena. Using the terms set by Figueroa, the first land grant issued in that area was approved by Estudillo himself, as alcalde on June 2, 1836. The recipient of that land grant was William A. Richardson, who had just become Estudillo's brother-in-law.

After his one-year term, Estudillo, his wife, and ten children moved across San Francisco Bay, settling just outside the Peraltas' Rancho San Antonio on San Leandro Creek, the first settlers in what would later be known as Eden township. He petitioned Governor Juan Bautista Alvarado to receive a land grant for the land between San Leandro Creek and San Lorenzo Creek in January 1837. Five years went by without a reply. Realizing that his original petition had been lost, he sent a second one in 1842. This time, Alvarado granted him the 6,829-acre (27.6 km^{2}) Rancho San Leandro (named after Saint Leander, Estudillo's patron saint) that he requested. That same year, Ignacio Peralta would build his adobe across the creek from Estudillo.

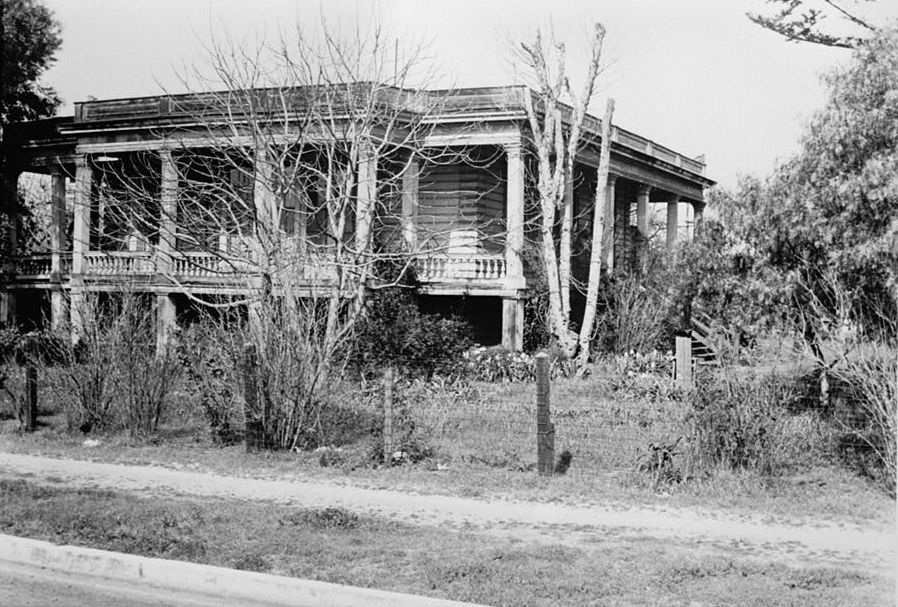
Casa de Estudillo, 1940

The cession of Alta California to the United States and the California Gold Rush marked a turning point in his life. After the influx of Americans, the price of cattle increased from $2/head to $60. Estudillo sold off his entire stock, and built a grand house in 1850, lavishly furnishing it with wares from around the world. On the other hand, squatters overran his land and wreaked havoc with his horses and cattle (before they were sold), so much that their encampment became known as "Squatterville". It was only through the efforts of two of Estudillo's sons-in-law, John B. Ward and William Heath Davis, that the squatters were brought under control. Ward and Davis later laid out the town site that would become San Leandro.

Estudillo died in 1852. His descendants donated the land where his house, Casa de Estudillo, stood for construction of St. Leander's Church. That site was declared California Historical Landmark #279, and sits on the street that now bears his name, Estudillo Avenue.
