= Casa de Estudillo (San Leandro, California) =

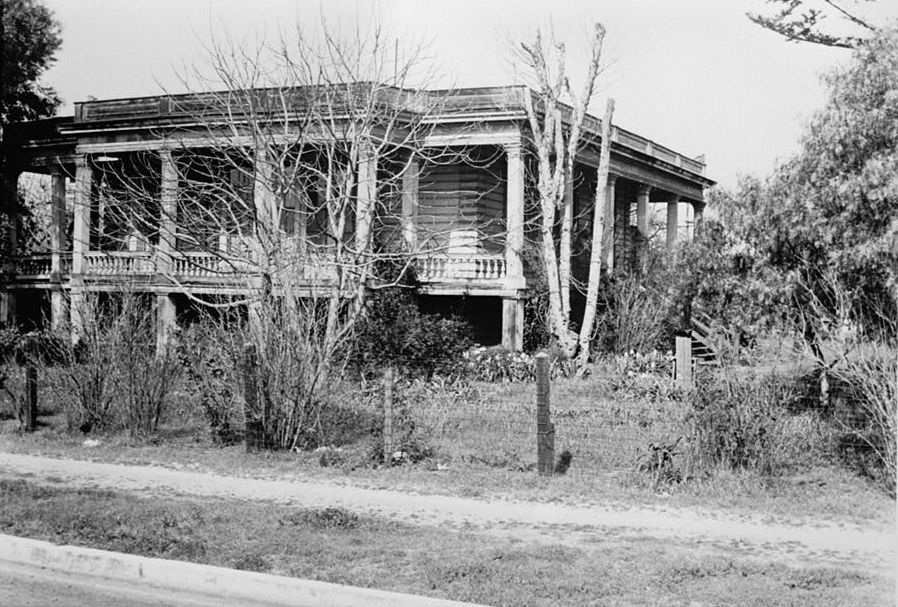
- Estudillo Home, 1940. Photo from the Library of Congress.
- Location: 550 W Estudillo Ave., San Leandro, California
- Coordinates: 37.7234°N 122.1601°W

California Historical Landmark
- Reference no.: 279

Casa de Estudillo was a 19th-century adobe house, located in San Leandro, California. It was built by Don José Joaquín Estudillo, a member of the prominent Estudillo family of California.

== History ==
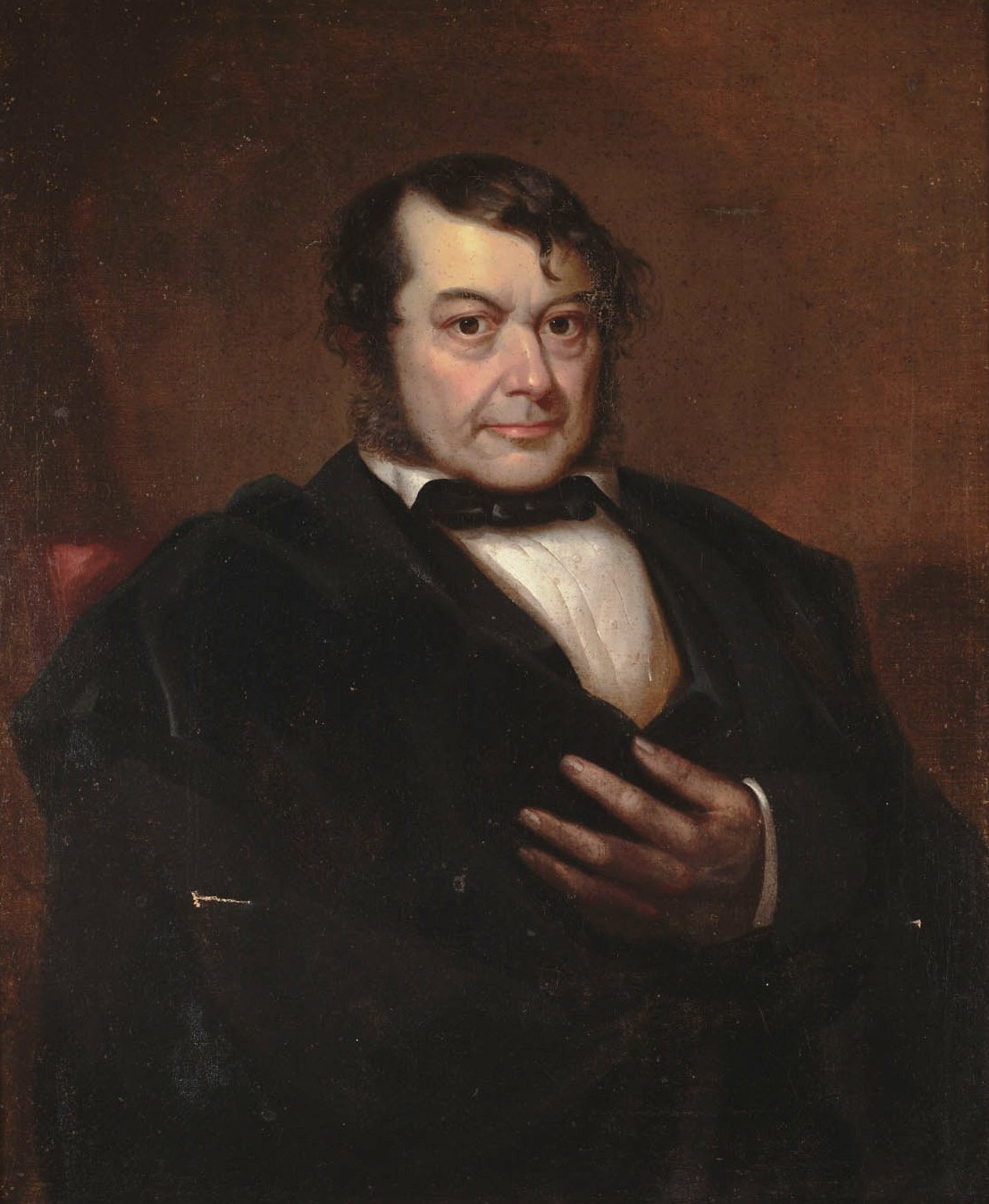
Californio statesman José Joaquín Estudillo

It was built around 1850, and was the last home of José Joaquín Estudillo, a member of the prominent Estudillo family of California, and his wife Juana Martínez de Estudillo.

The site is now the location of St. Leander's Church. There is a plaque commemorating the house.

Landmark

The site of Casa de Estudillo is a California Historical Landmark.

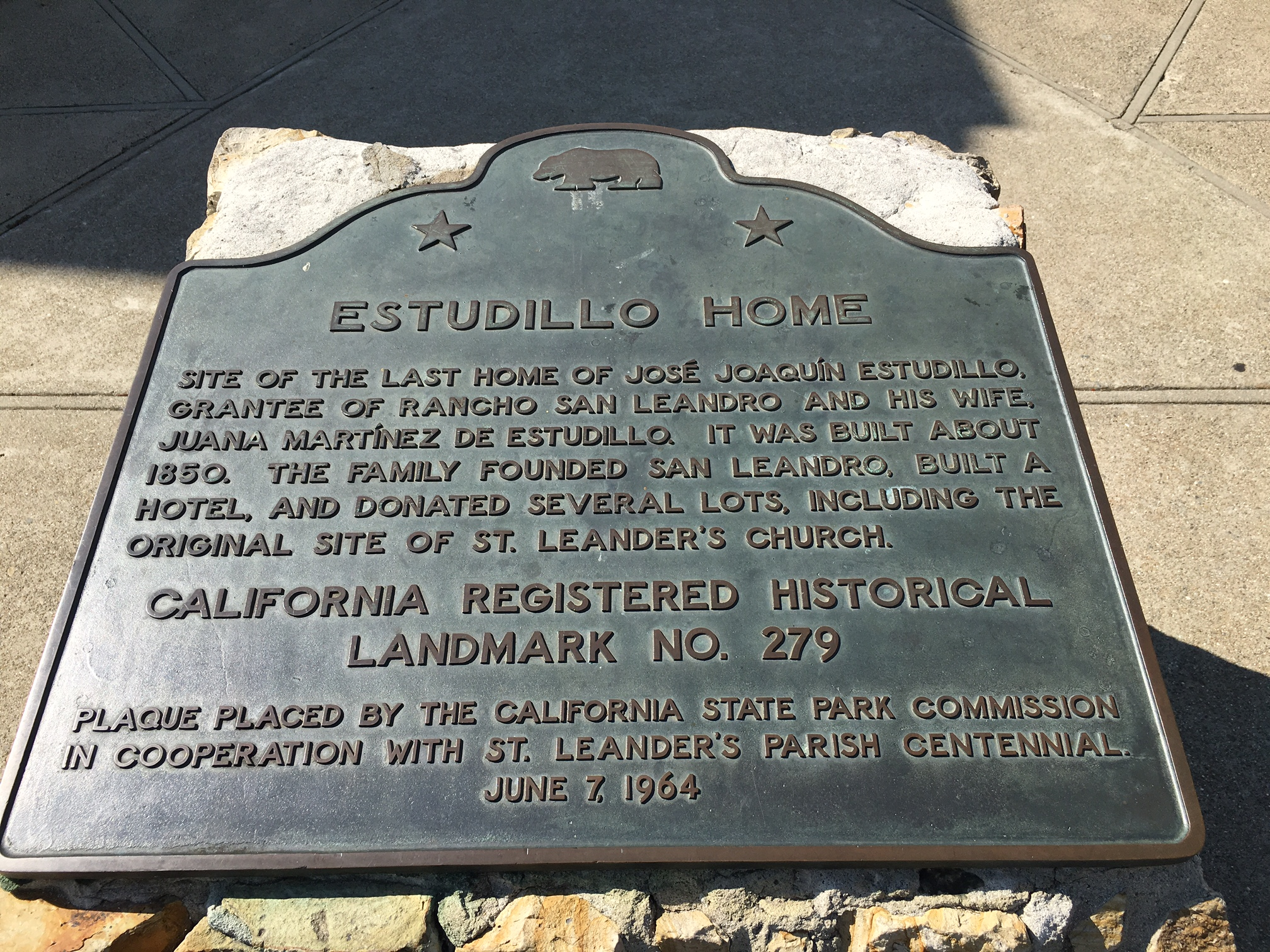
Plaque of Estudillo Home

== See also ==
- California Historical Landmarks in Alameda County, California
