= Estudillo family of California =

Prominent 19th and 20th century Californio family

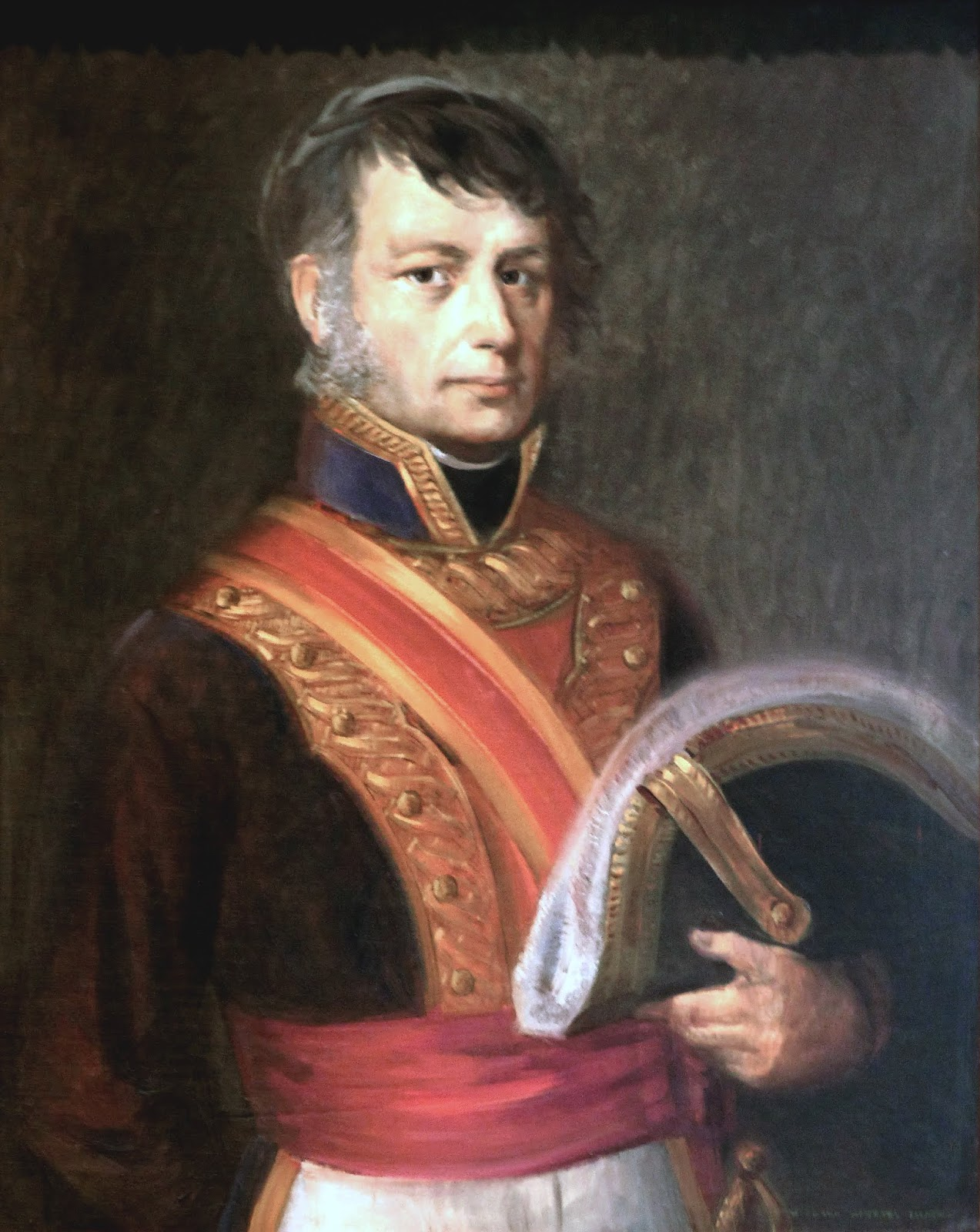
José María Estudillo.

The Estudillo family was a prominent Californio family of Southern California. Members of the family held extensive ranchos and numerous important positions, including California State Treasurer, mayor of San Diego, and commandant of the Presidio of San Diego.

== Notable members ==
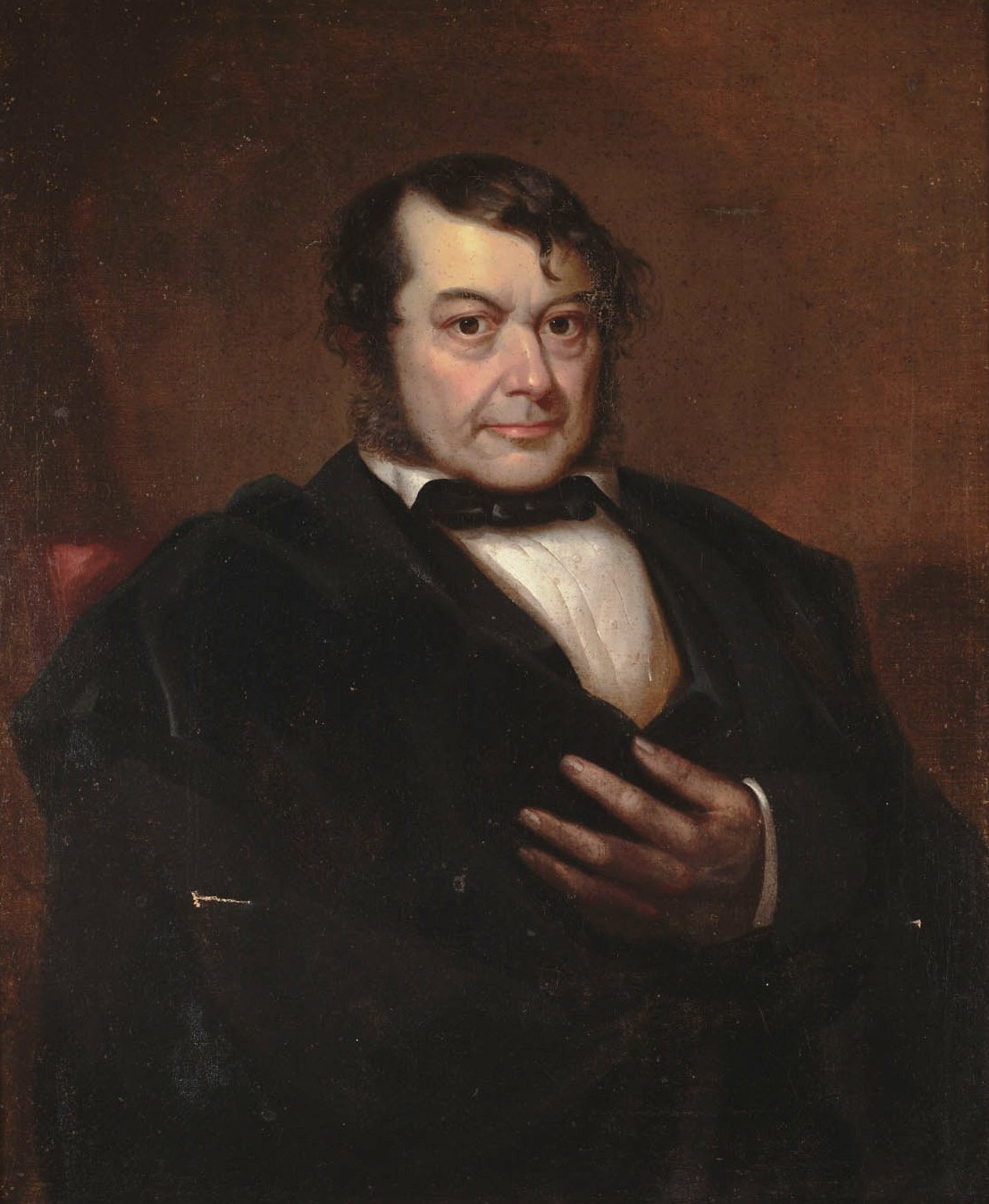
José Joaquin Estudillo.

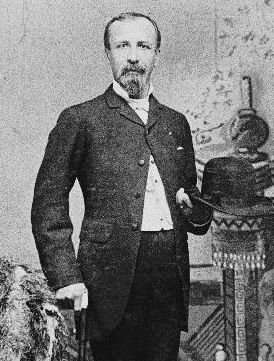
José G. Estudillo.

=== José María Estudillo ===
José María Estudillo is the founder of the family. He was one of the first settlers of San Diego and a celebrated military officer. He served twice as Commandant of the Presidio of San Diego (1820–1821 and 1827–1830). He built the Casa de Estudillo of San Diego, a National Historical Landmark. During an 1823 expedition through the Coachella Valley, he first recorded the existence of thermal springs near modern-day Palm Springs, California.

=== José Joaquín Estudillo ===
José Joaquín Estudillo was born in Monterey in 1800. He enlisted as an officer at aged 15 and served at the Presidio of Monterey. He later served one term as Alcalde of San Francisco (mayor) from 1835 to 1836. He was in charge of the secularization of Mission San Francisco de Asís at the beginning of 1835. He was granted Rancho San Leandro in Contra Costa in 1837 and later founded the city of San Leandro. There he built the Casa de Estudillo of San Leandro, a Californian Historic Landmark.

=== José Antonio Estudillo ===
José Antonio Estudillo was born in Monterey in 1803. He enlisted as a soldier at the Presidio of San Diego. He served one term as Alcalde of San Diego (mayor), from 1837 to 1839, and twice as acting mayor, in 1845 and 1846. He was granted Rancho Janal in 1829 and Rancho San Jacinto Viejo in 1842. He served as the first San Diego County Assessor in 1850.

=== José Guadalupe Estudillo ===
José Guadalupe Estudillo was born in San Diego in 1838. He served as 10th California State Treasurer (1875 to 1880) and as 13th mayor of San Diego (1868 to 1869). He also served as Treasurer of San Diego County from 1864 to 1875.

=== Other members ===
- Miguel Estudillo served in the California Senate (1908–1910) and the California State Assembly (1904–1908). While in the Assembly he authored the legislation giving Yosemite to the federal government for the establishment of a national park. While at the Senate, he supported Progressive reforms and chaired the then famous Committee on Election Laws. Described as a “lamb herding lions”, he failed to secure open primaries, cross filing or direct election of federal senators. He also served twice as City Attorney of Riverside, California (1918–1924 and 1941–1949).

== Legacy ==
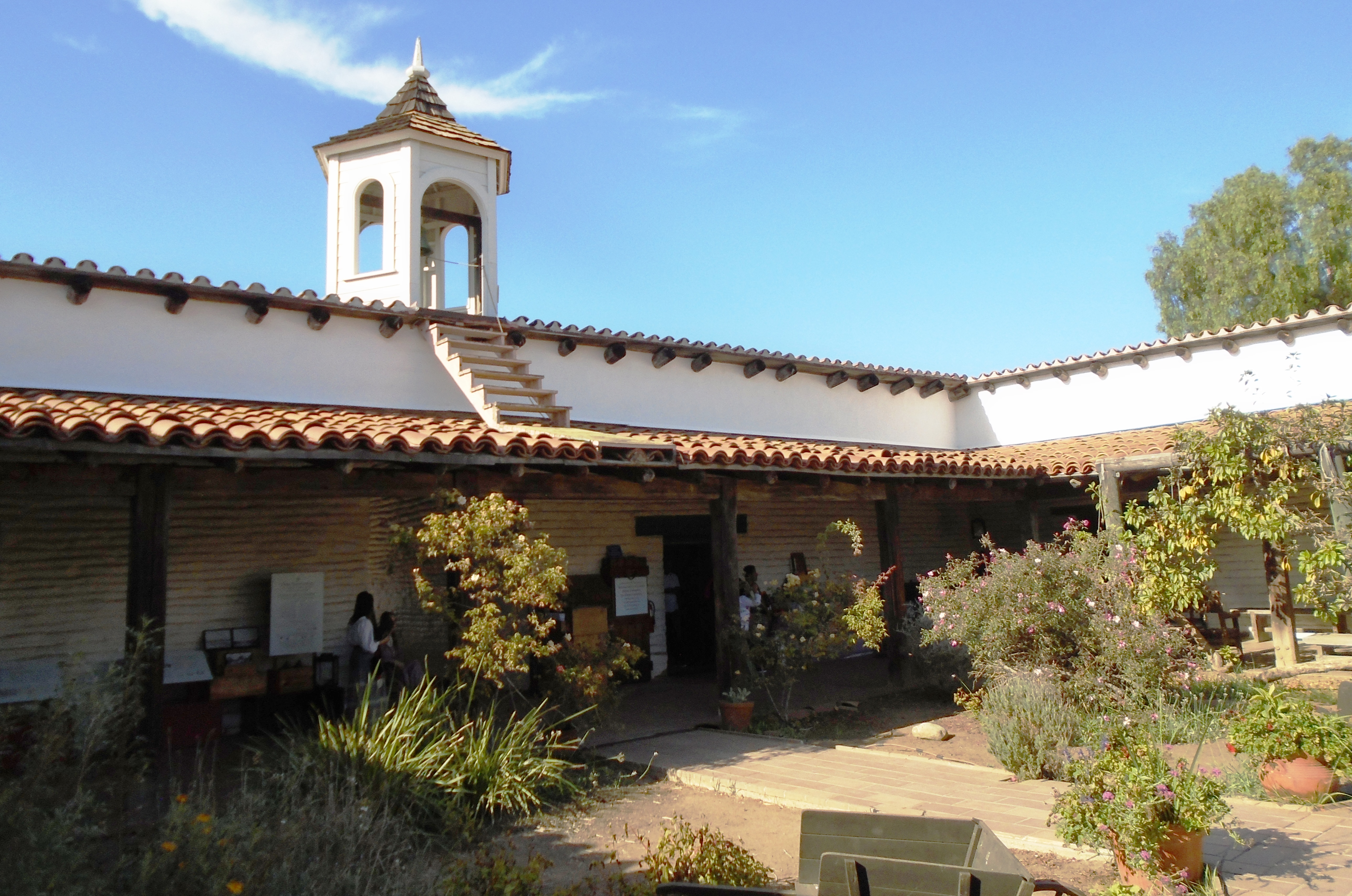
Casa de Estudillo in San Diego.

The Casa de Estudillo in San Diego is a National Historical Landmark. The Casa de Estudillo in San Leandro is a California Historic Landmark. The Estudillo Mansion in San Jacinto is open to the public as a museum. The Estudillo House in Riverside is a city landmark.

José Joaquin Estudillo founded the city of San Leandro, which is named after his Rancho San Leandro. Similarly, José Antonio Estudillo founded the town of San Jacinto, California, which is named after his Rancho San Jacinto.

Estudillo Elementary School in San Jacinto is named after José Antonio Estudillo.

Estudillo Street in Martinez and San Diego, as well as Estudillo Avenue in San Leandro, are named after the family.

== See also ==
- Media related to Estudillo family of California at Wikimedia Commons
- List of Californios people
