= José Antonio Estudillo =

Californian politician (1803–1852)

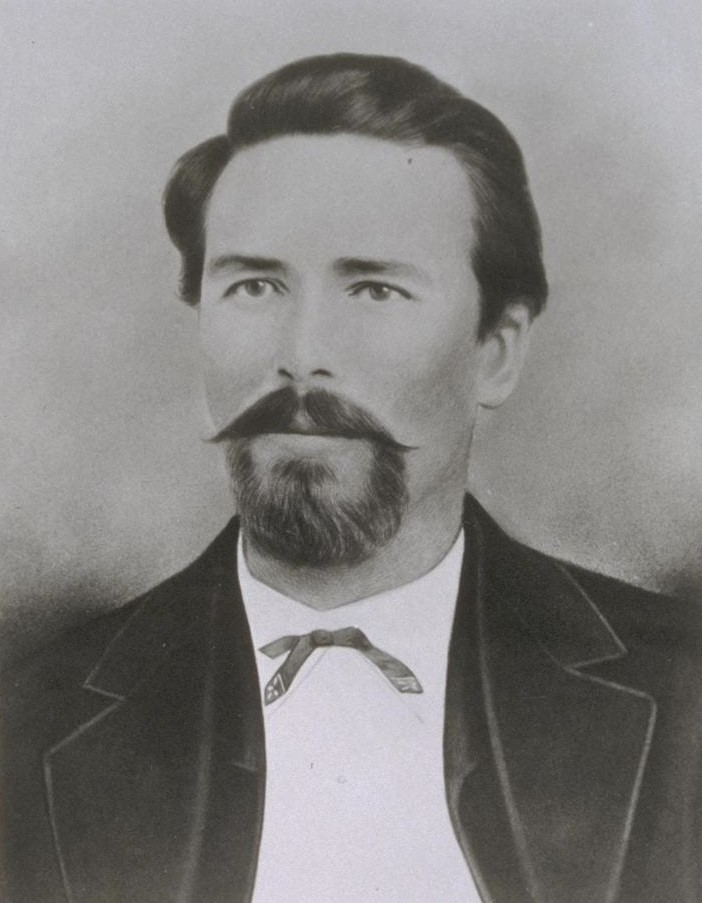

Alcalde of San Diego
- In office 1837-1839

1st San Diego County Assessor
- In office 1850

Personal details
- Born: November 5, 1803 Monterey, Las Californias, New Spain (now Monterey, California, U.S.)
- Died: July 20, 1852 (aged 48) San Diego, California, U.S.
- Spouse: María Victoria Dominguez
- Relations: José Joaquín Estudillo (brother); Miguel Pedrorena, José Antonio Aguirre (sons-in-law)
- Children: 12, including José G. Estudillo
- Parent: José María Estudillo (father)

José Antonio Estudillo (November 5, 1803 – July 20, 1852) was a Californio ranchero, politician, and soldier, who served as Alcalde of San Diego and as San Diego County Assessor. He was a member of the Estudillo family of California, a prominent Californio family of San Diego.
