= José María Estudillo =

Spanish-born Californio politician (died 1830)

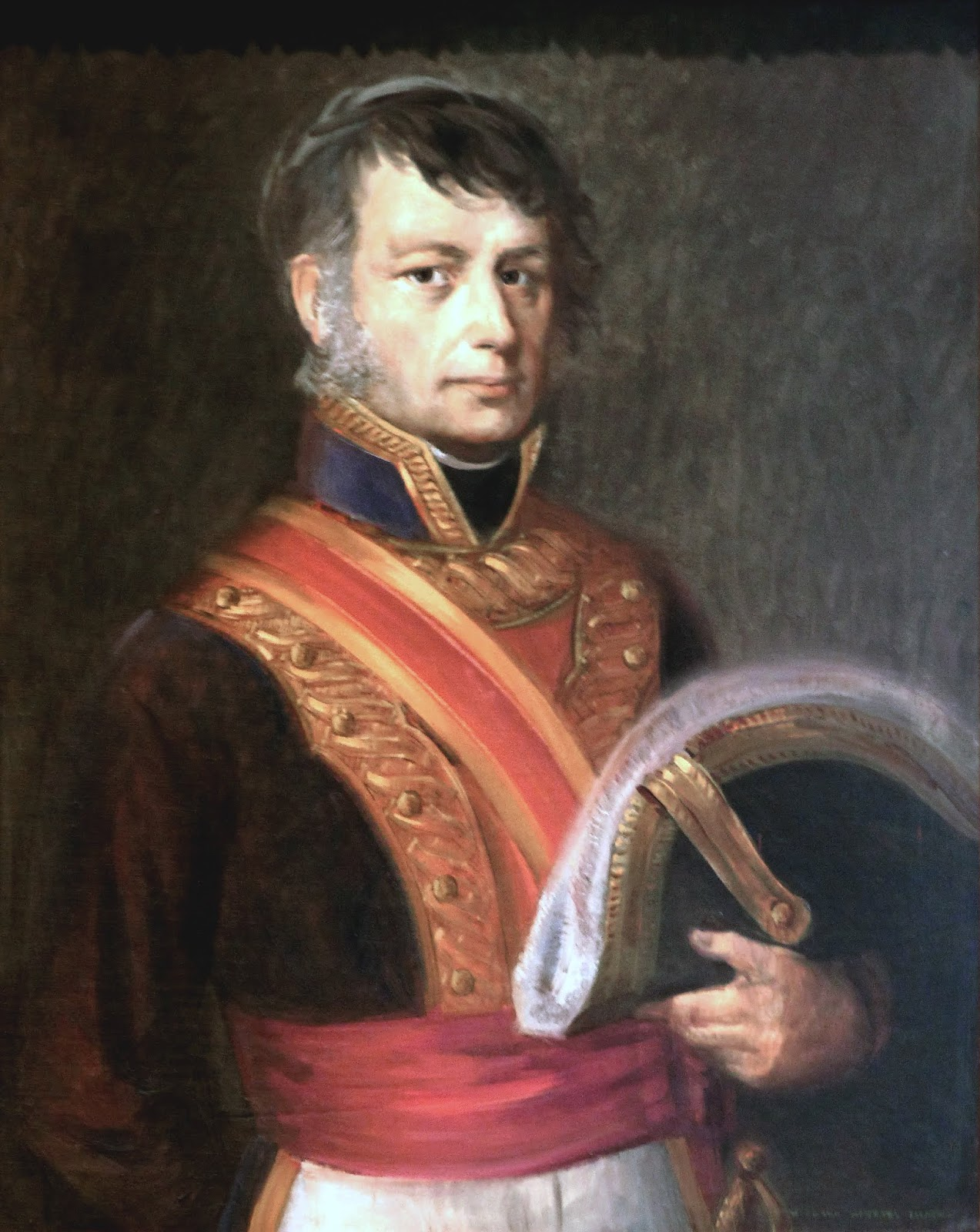
- Portrait held at the Casa de Estudillo in San Diego.

Commandant of the Presidio of San Diego
- In office 1827 – 8 April 1830
- Preceded by: Francisco María Ruiz
- Succeeded by: Santiago Argüello
- In office 23 October 1820 – September 1821
- Preceded by: Francisco María Ruiz
- Succeeded by: Francisco María Ruiz

Personal details
- Born: c. 1772 Andalusia, Spain
- Died: 1830 (aged 58–59) San Diego, Alta California, Mexico (now California, U.S.)
- Spouse: María Gertrudis Horcasitas (m. 1795)
- Relatives: Estudillo family
- Occupation: Military officer

Military service
- Allegiance: Spain; Mexico
- Rank: Captain
- Battles/wars: Bouchard's Raid

José María Estudillo (c. 1772 – 8 April 1830) was a Spanish-born Californio military officer who served in the Spanish and Mexican armies in the Californias. He was one of the early settlers of San Diego and the founder of the prominent Estudillo family. He served twice as Commandant of the Presidio of San Diego and oversaw the initial construction of the historic Casa de Estudillo.

== Biography ==
Estudillo was born around 1772 in Andalusia, Spain, during the late Bourbon period of the Spanish Empire. Details of his early life remained scarce, but historical accounts suggest he arrived in the Americas as a teenager, possibly around 1787, following family military connections. In 1795 he married María Gertrudis Horcasitas, a woman of Mexican birth.

Estudillo had a long career spanning over three decades, serving at various post including Loreto, Monterey and San Diego. Through faithful service he rose through ranks, becoming lieutenant of the Monterey company. Notable activities include, seeing combat during Bouchard's raid in 1818 and inland exploration reaching as far as the Soledad and Tulare regions in 1819. He served his first term as Commandant of the Presidio of San Diego from 1820–1821

By 1822, After Mexico gained independence from Spain, Estudillo took and oath of allegiance to the new Mexican government, participating in formal ceremonies where the Spanish flag was lowered and the Mexican one was raised. Although Peninsulares were at this time view with suspicion, Estudillo had earned recognition from the new government and faced no significant demotion, he in fact took part of local juntas (assemblies) to elect a deputy for the Mexican parliament. He was promoted to captain and was re-appointed Commandant of the Presidio of San Diego in 1827.

His family benefited significantly from Mexican rule as they were the recipients of Mexican land grants, rising to prominence as rancheros and officials, particularly his son, José Antonio. Estudillo died in 1830, still in active command of the Presidio.

== See also ==
- Estudillo family of California
- Casa de Estudillo
- Ranchos of California
