= List of California state high school football champions =

Below is a list of California state and regional high school football champions sanctioned by the California Interscholastic Federation since the organization began holding state championship games in 2006. High schools in the state are divided into four divisions (three prior to 2008) based roughly on enrollment; since 2008, there has also been an Open Division for which all schools are eligible. Starting in 2015, a new format was implemented to increase the number of state bowl games from 5 to 15, thus allowing every CIF Section champion to qualify.

== State champions ==
Year	Open Division	Division I	Division II	Division III	Division IV
2006 (I)	Not awarded	Canyon (Santa Clarita) def. De La Salle (Concord) 27–13	Lutheran (Orange) def. Palo Alto 42–28	Oaks Christian (Westlake Village) def. Cardinal Newman (Santa Rosa) 27–20 OT	Not awarded
2007 (II)	Not awarded	De La Salle (Concord) def. Centennial (Corona) 37–31	Oceanside def. Novato 28–14	St. Bonaventure (Ventura) def. Central Catholic (Modesto) 35–21	Not awarded
2008 (III)	Grant Union (Sacramento) def. Long Beach Poly 25–20	Centennial (Corona) def. De La Salle (Concord) 21–16	Cathedral Catholic (San Diego) def. St. Mary's (Stockton) 37–34	St. Bonaventure (Ventura) def. Cardinal Newman (Santa Rosa) 28–6	St. Margaret's Episcopal (San Juan Capistrano) def. Hamilton Union (Hamilton City) 59–7
2009 (IV)	De La Salle (Concord) def. Crenshaw (Los Angeles) 28–14	Oceanside def. Bellarmine (San Jose) 24–19	Servite (Anaheim) def. Rocklin 33–30	Serra (Gardena) def. Marin Catholic 24–20	Modesto Christian (Modesto) def. Francis Parker (San Diego) 44–40
2010 (V)	De La Salle (Concord) def. Servite (Anaheim) 48–8	Palo Alto def. Centennial (Corona)	Folsom def. Serra (Gardena) 48–20	Escalon def. Madison (San Diego) 30–14	Bishop's (La Jolla) def. Brookside Christian (Stockton) 40–14
2011 (VI)	De La Salle (Concord) def. Westlake (Westlake Village) 35–0	Santa Margarita Catholic (Rancho Santa Margarita) def. Bellarmine (San Jose) 42–37	Helix (La Mesa) def. Del Oro (Loomis) 35–24	Washington Union (Fresno) def. Campolindo (Moraga) 21–16	Sierra Canyon (Chatsworth) def. Le Grand 34–13
2012 (VII)	De La Salle (Concord) def. Centennial (Corona) 48–28	Granite Bay def. Long Beach Poly 21–20	Serra (Gardena) def. Oakdale 42–15	Madison (San Diego) def. Marin Catholic 38–35	Central Catholic (Modesto) def. Santa Fe Christian (Solana Beach) 66–7
2013 (VIII)	St. John Bosco (Bellflower) def. De La Salle (Concord) 20–14	Bakersfield def. Del Oro (Loomis) 56–26	Chaminade (West Hills) def. Enterprise (Redding) 41–9	Corona del Mar (Newport Beach) def. Sacred Prep (Atherton) 27–15	Central Catholic (Modesto) def. Bakersfield Christian 36–23
2014 (IX)	De La Salle (Concord) def. Centennial (Corona) 63–42	Folsom def. Oceanside 68–7	Redlands East Valley def. Clayton Valley Charter (Concord) 34–33	Campolindo (Moraga) def. El Capitan (Lakeside) 35–28	Central Catholic (Modesto) def. St. Margaret's Episcopal (San Juan Capistrano) 31–19

Year	Open Division	Open Division Small Schools	Division 1-AA	Division 1-A	Division 2-AA	Division 2-A	Division 3-AA	Division 3-A	Division 4-AA	Division 4-A	Division 5–AA	Division 5-A	Division 6-AA	Division 6-A	Division 7-AA	Division 7-A
2015 (X)	De La Salle (Concord) def. Centennial (Corona) 28–21	Central Catholic (Modesto) def. San Marino 56–21	Mission Viejo def. Bellarmine (San Jose) 24–0	Narbonne (Los Angeles) def. Clayton Valley Charter (Concord) 28–14	Del Oro (Loomis) def. Camarillo 16–13	Citrus Hill (Perris) def. St. Francis (Mountain View) 23–20	La Mirada def. Campolindo (Moraga) 27–3	Rancho Bernardo (San Diego) def. Sacred Heart Prep (Atherton) 35–14	Hanford def. Bonita Vista (Chula Vista) 33–21	Sierra (Manteca) def. Chowchilla 20–15	Mater Dei Catholic (Chula Vista) def. Immanuel (Reedley) 56–21	St. Bernard's (Eureka) def. Saddleback Valley Christian (San Juan Capistrano) 28–21	East Nicolaus def. Coronado 16–6	Not awarded		
2016 (XI)	St. John Bosco (Bellflower) def. De La Salle (Concord) 56–33	Not awarded	Cathedral Catholic (San Diego) def. St. Mary's (Stockton) 38–35 OT	San Clemente def. Del Oro (Loomis) 22–17	Madison (San Diego) def. Valley Christian (San Jose) 21–17	Sierra Canyon (Chatsworth) def. Serra (San Mateo) 42–40	Paraclete def. Menlo-Atherton 39–21	Oakdale def. Bishop's (La Jolla) 47–0	Campolindo (Moraga) def. Bakersfield Christian 31–7	Pleasant Valley (Chico) def. St. Anthony (Long Beach) 50–49 OT	Bishop O'Dowd (Oakland) def. Valley View 43–24	McClymonds (Oakland) def. La Jolla Country Day 20–17	Rancho Christian def. Amador (Sutter Creek, CA) 38–13	St. Patrick-St. Vincent (Vallejo) def. Strathmore 29–28	Not awarded	
2017 (XII)	Mater Dei (Santa Ana) def. De La Salle (Concord) 52–21	Not awarded	Folsom def. Helix (La Mesa) 49–42	Narbonne (Los Angeles) def. Pittsburg 28–21	Serra (San Mateo) def. Cajon (San Bernardino) 38–14	St. Francis (Mountain View) def. Grace Brethren (Simi Valley) 22–13	Bishop Diego (Santa Barbara) def. Shasta (Redding) 41–6	Steele Canyon (Spring Valley) def. Half Moon Bay 44–42	Crenshaw (Los Angeles) def. Placer (Auburn) 46–43	Milpitas def. Southwest (El Centro) 45–41	McClymonds (Oakland) def. Golden West (Visalia) 42–12	Fortuna def. Katella (Anaheim) 54–33	Strathmore def. Orange 31–29	Galileo (San Francisco) def. Vincent Memorial (Calexico) 38–20	Not awarded	
2018 (XIII)	Mater Dei (Santa Ana) def. De La Salle (Concord) 35–21	Not awarded	Folsom def. Cathedral Catholic (San Diego) 21–14 OT	Liberty (Brentwood) def. Sierra Canyon (Chatsworth) 19–17	Grace Brethren (Simi Valley) def. Del Oro (Loomis) 21–14	Lawndale def. San Joaquin Memorial (Fresno) 20–12	Menlo-Atherton def. Lincoln (San Diego) 21–7	Wilcox (Santa Clara) def. Kaiser (Fontana) 41–27	Pleasant Valley (Chico) def. Central Valley Christian 43–14	McClymonds (Oakland) def. Garfield (Los Angeles) 32–6	Rio Linda def. San Gorgonio (San Bernardino) 38–35	San Diego def. Colfax 21–10	Hilmar def. Strathmore 49–0	Lincoln (San Francisco) def. Orange Glen 24–13	Denair def. Santee (Los Angeles) 42–14	Not awarded
2019 (XIV)	St. John Bosco (Bellflower) def. De La Salle (Concord) 49–28	Not awarded	Central (Fresno) def. Sierra Canyon (Chatsworth) 34–19	Corona del Mar (Newport Beach) def. Serra (San Mateo) 35–27	Clayton Valley Charter (Concord) def. Aquinas (San Bernardino) 10–7	Pacifica (Oxnard) def. McClymonds (Oakland) 34–6	Cardinal Newman (Santa Rosa) def. El Camino (Oceanside) 31–14	Bakersfield Christian def. Rancho Cotate (Rohnert Park) 42–21	Ripon def. Highland (Palmdale) 31–28	Escalon def. La Jolla 52–21	El Monte def. Del Norte (Crescent City) 32–7	Milpitas def. Reseda 34–0	St. Bernard's (Eureka) def. South (Torrance) 34–20	Salesian (Richmond) def. Bishop Union 37–18	Lincoln (San Francisco) def. Gardena 35–26	Not awarded
2020 (Note: No state or regional champions were awarded in the 2020 season due to the COVID-19 pandemic)	Not awarded	Not awarded	Not awarded													
2021 (XV)	Mater Dei (Santa Ana) def. Serra (San Mateo) 44–7	Not awarded	Cathedral Catholic (San Diego) def. Folsom 33–21	Serra (Gardena) def. Liberty (Bakersfield) 21–16	Mater Dei Catholic (Chula Vista) def. Central Catholic (Modesto) 34–25	Scripps Ranch (San Diego) def. Wilcox (Santa Clara) 31–28	Vanden (Fairfield) def. Aquinas (San Bernardino) 14–13	McClymonds (Oakland) def. Birmingham (Los Angeles) 54–7	Marin Catholic def. Central Valley Christian 33–14	Sacred Heart Cathedral def. Northview (Covina) 48–29	San Marin (Novato) def. Independence (Bakersfield) 20–14	Sacred Heart Prep (Atherton) def. Righetti (Santa Maria) 16–0	Argonaut (Jackson) def. Quartz Hill 47–14	Salesian (Richmond) def. Arlington (Riverside) 42–21	Fall River def. Morro Bay 43–3	Balboa (San Francisco) def. Taft (Los Angeles) 43–0
2022 (XVI)	St. John Bosco (Bellflower) def. Serra (San Mateo) 45–0	Not awarded	Lincoln (San Diego) def. De La Salle (Concord) 33–28	Liberty (Bakersfield) def. Pittsburg 48–20	Mater Dei Catholic (Chula Vista) def. McClymonds (Oakland) 26–18	Granite Hills (El Cajon) def. San Ramon Valley 31–24 OT	Grant Union (Sacramento) def. San Jacinto 36–34	Laguna Hills def. Bellarmine (San Jose) 28–27	Escalon def. Northwood (Irvine) 28–7	San Marin (Novato) def. Granada Hills 32–8	Hughson def. Muir (Pasadena) 9–6	Orland def. Shafter 20–7	The Classical Academy (Escondido) def. Santa Teresa (San Jose) 7–0	Atascadero def. San Gabriel 41–0	Pinole Valley def. Mendota 34–21	Lincoln (San Francisco) def. Crenshaw (Los Angeles) 54–6
2023 (XVII)	Mater Dei (Santa Ana) def. Serra (San Mateo) 35–0	Not awarded	Mission Viejo def. De La Salle (Concord) 27–14	Folsom def. St. Bonaventure (Ventura) 20–14	La Serna (Whittier) def. Grant Union (Sacramento) 21–19	Central Valley Christian def. Los Gatos 45–42	Acalanes (Lafayette) def. Birmingham (Los Angeles) 35–23	Marin Catholic def. Mayfair (Lakewood) 38–18	Soquel def. Jurupa Hills 28–7	Palma (Salinas) def. Mission Oak (Tulare) 42–19	Ramona (Riverside) def. Pleasant Valley (Chico) 35–7	Woodland Christian def. Banning (Wilmington) 23–13	St. Vincent de Paul (Petaluma) def. Wasco 27–6	Colusa def. Sweetwater (National City) 33–17	Ferndale def. Fairfax (Los Angeles) 29–21	Strathmore def. Bell Gardens 42–7
2024 (XVIII)	Mater Dei (Santa Ana) def. De La Salle (Concord) 37–15	Not awarded	Lincoln (San Diego) def. Pittsburg 28–26	Edison (Huntington Beach) def. Central (Fresno) 21–14	Grant Union (Sacramento) def. Pacifica (Oxnard) 35–28	Palos Verdes def. Twelve Bridges (Lincoln) 55–19	Frontier (Bakersfield) def. Amador Valley (Pleasanton) 18–14	Vanden (Fairfield) def. Rio Hondo Prep (Arcadia) 42–41 OT	St. Vincent de Paul (Petaluma) def. Highland (Palmdale) 25–23	Sonora def. St. Pius X - St. Matthias Academy 52–34	Carmel def. El Capitan (Lakeside) 48–7	American Canyon def. Palmdale 68–47	Arcata def. Portola (Irvine) 27–21 OT	Summerville def. Monte Vista (Spring Valley) 38–21	Moreau Catholic (Hayward) def. Lindsay 42–8	Balboa (San Francisco) def. Pioneer (Whittier) 55–21
2025 (XIX)	Santa Margarita Catholic (Rancho Santa Margarita) def. De La Salle (Concord) 47–13	Not awarded	Folsom def. Cathedral Catholic (San Diego) 42–28	Central East (Fresno) def. Pacifica (Oxnard) 42–28	St. Mary's (Stockton) def. Bakersfield Christian 27–24	Sonora def. Rio Hondo Prep (Arcadia) 35–10	St. Ignatius (San Francisco) def. Ventura 42–35	Kennedy (Delano) def. McClymonds (Oakland) 42–25	Barstow def. Sutter 17–7	El Cerrito def. Beckman (Irvine) 35–12	Bishop O'Dowd (Oakland) def. Christian (El Cajon) 37–0	Calaveras (San Andreas) def. Bishop Union 42–21	Valley Center def. Lincoln (San Jose) 36–35	Winters def. Morse (San Diego) 28–7	Redding Christian (Palo Cedro) def. Woodbridge (Irvine) 16–0	Balboa (San Francisco) def. South El Monte 42–8

== Regional champions ==
=== Northern California ===
Year	Open Division	Division I	Division II	Division III	Division IV
2006 (Note: Listed in years from 2006–2011 is Regional Selection for each division. Regional Games began in 2012.)	Not awarded	De La Salle (Concord)	Palo Alto	Cardinal Newman (Santa Rosa)	Not awarded
2007	Not awarded	De La Salle (Concord)	Novato	Central Catholic (Modesto)	Not awarded
2008	Grant Union (Sacramento)	De La Salle (Concord)	St. Mary's (Stockton)	Cardinal Newman (Santa Rosa)	Hamilton Union (Hamilton City)
2009	De La Salle (Concord)	Bellarmine (San Jose)	Rocklin	Marin Catholic	Modesto Christian (Modesto)
2010	De La Salle (Concord)	Palo Alto	Folsom	Escalon	Brookside Christian (Stockton)
2011	De La Salle (Concord)	Bellarmine (San Jose)	Del Oro (Loomis)	Washington Union (Fresno)	Le Grand
2012	De La Salle (Concord) def. Folsom 49–15	Granite Bay def. St. Ignatius (San Francisco) 45–17	Oakdale def. Clayton Valley Charter (Concord) 27–24	Marin Catholic def. Sutter 23–7	Central Catholic (Modesto) def. McClymonds (Oakland) 42–12
2013	De La Salle (Concord) def. Folsom 45–17	Del Oro (Loomis) def. Serra (San Mateo) 28–20	Enterprise (Redding) def. Manteca 27–21	Sacred Prep (Atherton) def. El Cerrito 42–7	Central Catholic (Modesto) def. McClymonds (Oakland) 17–14
2014	De La Salle (Concord)	Folsom def. Grant Union (Sacramento) 52–21	Clayton Valley Charter (Concord) def. Oakdale 28–7	Campolindo (Moraga) def. Sutter 35–14	Central Catholic (Modesto) def. Capital Christian (Sacramento) 35–14

Year	Open Division	Open Division Small Schools	Division 1-AA	Division 1-A	Division 2-AA	Division 2-A	Division 3-AA	Division 3-A	Division 4-AA	Division 4-A	Division 5-AA	Division 5-A	Division 6-AA	Division 6-AA Play-in Game (Note: Due to the number of section divisions, a play-in game is conducted in the North for Division VI-AA and Division VI-A. Listed in respective years is result of Division VI-AA North play-in game and Division VI-A North play-in game. These games were discontinued for 2018 and replaced with an additional division: Division 7AA.)	Division 6-A	Division 6-A Play-in Game	Division 7-AA	Division 7-A
2015	De La Salle (Concord)	Central Catholic (Modesto) def. Marin Catholic 49–14	Bellarmine (San Jose) def. Folsom 42–35	Clayton Valley Charter (Concord) def. Oak Grove (San Jose) 21–3	Del Oro (Loomis) def. Liberty (Bakersfield) 28–24	St. Francis (Mountain View) def. Pleasant Valley (Chico) 29–7	Campolindo (Moraga) def. Milpitas 27–24	Sacred Heart Prep (Atherton) def. McClymonds (Oakland) 56–20	Hanford def. Sonora 42–18	Sierra (Manteca) def. Sutter 17–13	Immanuel (Reedley) def. Bradshaw Christian (Sacramento) 31–21	St. Bernard's (Eureka) def. Fall River 55–0	East Nicolaus def. Stone Ridge Christian (Merced) 34–14	Stone Ridge Christian def. Mission (San Francisco) 70–21	Not awarded			
2016	De La Salle (Concord)	Not awarded	St. Mary's (Stockton) def. Freedom (Oakley) 49–40	Del Oro (Loomis) def. Bakersfield 57–16	Valley Christian (San Jose) def. Cardinal Newman (Santa Rosa) 31–6	Serra (San Mateo) def. Sanger 49–36	Menlo-Atherton def. Manteca 49–21	Oakdale def. Sutter 27–10	Campolindo (Moraga) def. Palma (Salinas) 30–21	Pleasant Valley (Chico) def. Milpitas 24–21	Bishop O'Dowd (Oakland) def. Capital Christian (Sacramento) 24–21	McClymonds (Oakland) def. East Nicolaus 45–26	Amador (Sutter Creek, CA) def. Mendota 21–14	Amador (Sutter Creek, CA) def. Lincoln (San Francisco) 45–20	St. Patrick-St. Vincent (Vallejo) def. Brookside Christian (Stockton) 47–18	Brookside Christian (Stockton) def. Biggs 52–30	Not awarded	
2017	De La Salle (Concord)	Not awarded	Folsom def. Central (Fresno) 54–35	Pittsburg def. Granite Bay 37–14	Serra (San Mateo) def. Tulare Union 76–43	St. Francis (Mountain View) def. Manteca 28–23	Shasta (Redding) def. Marin Catholic 40–27	Half Moon Bay def. Sutter 28–7	Placer (Auburn) def. Salinas 43–42 OT	Milpitas def. Campolindo (Moraga) 52–38	McClymonds (Oakland) def. East Nicolaus 35–12	Fortuna def. Bear River (Grass Valley) 34–20	Strathmore def. St. Patrick-St. Vincent (Vallejo) 49–35	Strathmore def. Hilmar 53–52 2OT	Galileo (San Francisco) def. Rio Vista 20–14	Not awarded		
2018	De La Salle (Concord)	Not awarded	Folsom def. Central (Fresno) 84–46	Liberty (Brentwood) def. Valley Christian (San Jose) 33–21	Del Oro (Loomis) def. St. Francis (Mountain View) 14–13 (championship vacated)	San Joaquin Memorial (Fresno) def. Tulare Union 69–25	Menlo-Atherton def. Eureka 27–20	Wilcox (Santa Clara) def. Capital Christian (Sacramento) 34–30	Pleasant Valley (Chico) (Note: Three teams had byes in the NorCal divisions in 2018 due to NCS forgoing the NorCal regional games due to delays from the 2018 Camp Fire. In 4AA the NCS D2 winner would have represented, in 5A NCS D4, in 6A NCS D5.)	McClymonds (Oakland) def. Aptos 28–20	Rio Linda def. West Valley (Cottonwood) 21–13	Colfax	Hilmar def. East Nicolaus 48–14	Not awarded	Lincoln (San Francisco)	Not awarded	Denair	Not awarded
2019	De La Salle (Concord)	Not awarded	Central (Fresno) def. Oak Ridge (El Dorado Hills) 38–32	Serra (San Mateo) def. San Joaquin Memorial (Fresno) 28–18	Clayton Valley Charter (Concord) def. Elk Grove 28–26	McClymonds (Oakland) def. Manteca 46–13	Cardinal Newman (Santa Rosa) def. Los Gatos 42–7	Rancho Cotate (Rohnert Park) def. Sierra (Manteca) 10–0	Ripon def. Sutter 31–14	Escalon def. Pleasant Valley (Chico) 41–17	Del Norte (Crescent City) def. King's Academy 21–14	Milpitas def. Caruthers 26–19	St. Bernard's (Eureka) def. East Nicolaus 45–29	Not awarded	Salesian (Richmond) def. Santa Cruz 35–14	Not awarded	Lincoln (San Francisco) def. Mariposa County 21–14	Not awarded
2020	Not awarded																	
2021	Serra (San Mateo)	Not awarded	Folsom def. De La Salle (Concord) 28–27	Liberty (Bakersfield) def. Pittsburg 35–7	Central Catholic (Modesto) def. Bullard (Fresno) 44–41	Wilcox (Santa Clara) def. Manteca 35–21	Vanden (Fairfield) def. Windsor 56–28	McClymonds (Oakland) def. Campolindo (Moraga) 40–21	Marin Catholic def. Escalon 21–14	Sacred Heart Cathedral def. Chico 31–7	San Marin (Novato) def. Sutter 35–7	Sacred Heart Prep (Atherton) def. University Prep (Redding) 20–0	Argonaut (Jackson) def. St. Vincent de Paul (Petaluma) 42–12	Not awarded	Salesian (Richmond) def. Aragon (San Mateo) 36–28	Not awarded	Fall River def. Le Grand 42–21	Balboa (San Francisco)
2022	Serra (San Mateo)	Not awarded	De La Salle (Concord) def. Folsom 17–14	Pittsburg def. Manteca 35–14	McClymonds (Oakland) def. Lemoore 49–35	San Ramon Valley def. Marin Catholic 19–17	Grant Union (Sacramento) def. El Cerrito 36–7	Bellarmine (San Jose) def. Vanden (Fairfield) 35–21	Escalon def. Pleasant Valley (Chico) 42–20	San Marin (Novato) def. Menlo School 29–21	Hughson def. Ripon Christian 31–28	Orland def. Clear Lake 42–21	Santa Teresa (San Jose) def. Palo Alto 30–20	Not awarded	Atascadero def. Colusa 21–0	Not awarded	Pinole Valley	Lincoln (San Francisco)
2023	Serra (San Mateo)	Not awarded	De La Salle (Concord) def. Clovis North 41–0	Folsom def. Pittsburg 28–25	Grant Union (Sacramento) def. Rocklin 41–14	Los Gatos def. El Cerrito 14–6	Acalanes (Lafayette) def. Escalon 49–14	Marin Catholic def. McClymonds (Oakland) 35–28	Soquel def. Casa Roble (Orangevale) 42–14	Hughson def. Palma (Salinas) 31–21	Pleasant Valley (Chico) def. Miramonte (Orinda) 31–12	Woodland Christian def. Orland 28–0	St. Vincent de Paul (Petaluma) def. Palo Alto 28–26	Not awarded	Colusa def. South San Francisco 42–6	Not awarded	Ferndale def. Portola 32–7	Strathmore def. Lincoln (San Francisco) 41–15
2024	De La Salle (Concord)	Not awarded	Pittsburg def. Folsom 28–27	Central (Fresno) def. St. Ignatius (San Francisco) 33–23	Grant Union (Sacramento) def. St. Francis (Mountain View) 38–30	Twelve Bridges (Lincoln) def. Wilcox (Santa Clara) 28–27	Amador Valley (Pleasanton) def. McClymonds (Oakland) 44–33	Vanden (Fairfield) def. Pleasant Valley (Chico) 28–14	St. Vincent de Paul (Petaluma) def. Hughson 42–14	Sonora def. Kerman 63–28	Carmel def. Acalanes (Lafayette) 42–41	American Canyon def. Lassen 43–20	Arcata def. Winters 35–14	Not awarded	Summerville def. Sacred Heart Prep (Atherton) 45–28	Not awarded	Moreau Catholic (Hayward) def. Leland (San Jose) 42–11	Balboa (San Francisco) def. Los Molinos 41–6
2025	De La Salle (Concord)	Not awarded	Folsom def. Archbishop Riordan (San Francisco) 42–38	Central East (Fresno) def. Pittsburg 55–36	St. Mary's (Stockton) def. Serra (San Mateo) 31–24	Sonora def. Woodcreek (Roseville) 41–14	St. Ignatius (San Francisco) def. Monte Vista (Danville) 17–13	McClymonds (Oakland) def. Roseville 42–34	Sutter def. Ferndale 21–7	El Cerrito def. Menlo-Atherton 20–16	Bishop O'Dowd (Oakland) def. Chico 23–20	Calaveras (San Andreas) def. Miramonte (Orinda) 35–7	Lincoln (San Jose) def. Gridley High School 28–20	Not awarded	Winters def. Minarets (O'Neals) 26–12	Not awarded	Redding Christian (Palo Cedro) def. Middletown 22–18	Balboa (San Francisco) def. Piedmont Hills (San Jose) 38–10

=== Southern California ===
Year	Open Division	Division I	Division II	Division III	Division IV
2006	Not awarded	Canyon (Santa Clarita)	Lutheran (Orange)	Oaks Christian (Westlake Village)	Not awarded
2007	Not awarded	Centennial (Corona)	Oceanside	St. Bonaventure (Ventura)	Not awarded
2008	Long Beach Poly	Centennial (Corona)	Cathedral Catholic (San Diego)	St. Bonaventure (Ventura)	St. Margaret's Episcopal (San Juan Capistrano)
2009	Crenshaw (Los Angeles)	Oceanside	Servite (Anaheim)	Serra (Gardena)	Francis Parker (San Diego)
2010	Servite (Anaheim)	Centennial (Corona)	Serra (Gardena)	Madison (San Diego)	Bishop's (La Jolla)
2011	Westlake (Westlake Village)	Santa Margarita Catholic (Rancho Santa Margarita)	Helix (La Mesa)	Washington Union (Fresno)	Sierra Canyon (Chatsworth)
2012	Centennial (Corona) def. Narbonne (Los Angeles) 41–34	Long Beach Poly def. Clovis North 28–7	Serra (Gardena) def. Edison (Huntington Beach) 27–10	Madison (San Diego) def. Monrovia 21–17	Santa Fe Christian (Solana Beach) def. Rio Hondo Prep (Arcadia) 30–28
2013	St. John Bosco (Bellflower) def. Centennial (Corona) 70–49	Bakersfield def. Mission Hills (San Marcos) 35–28	Chaminade (West Hills) def. Hart (Newhall) 28–10	Corona del Mar (Newport Beach) def. Nordhoff (Ojai) 24–8	Bakersfield Christian def. View Park (Los Angeles) 40–8
2014	Centennial (Corona)	Oceanside def. Edison (Fresno) 37–22	Redlands East Valley def. Ridgeview (Bakersfield) 59–42	El Capitan (Lakeside) def. Paso Robles 41–0	St. Margaret's Episcopal (San Juan Capistrano) def. Christian (El Cajon) 48–21

Year	Open Division	Open Division Small Schools	Division 1-AA	Division 1-A	Division 2-AA	Division 2-A	Division 3-AA	Division 3-A	Division 4-AA	Division 4-A	Division 5–AA	Division 5-A	Division 6-AA	Division 6-A	Division 7-AA	Division 7-A
2015	Centennial (Corona)	San Marino def. Sierra Canyon 36–35	Mission Viejo def. Helix (La Mesa) 32–28	Narbonne (Los Angeles) def. Ridgeview (Bakersfield) 35–20	Camarillo def. La Habra 63–49	Citrus Hill (Perris) def. Calabasas 56–21	La Mirada def. Oceanside 36–14	Rancho Bernardo (San Diego) def. Oak Hills (Hesperia) 31–30	Bonita Vista (Chula Vista) def. Canyon (Anaheim) 24–21	Chowchilla def. Fairfax (Los Angeles) 28–16	Mater Dei Catholic (Chula Vista) def. Notre Dame (Riverside) 21–14	Saddleback Valley Christian (San Juan Capistrano) def. Kennedy (Delano) 59–45	Coronado def. Belmont (Los Angeles) 14–0	Not awarded		
2016	St. John Bosco (Bellflower)	Not awarded	Cathedral Catholic (San Diego) def. Narbonne (Los Angeles) 35–28	San Clemente def. Edison (Huntington Beach) 39–35	Madison (San Diego) def. Calabasas 60–53 OT	Sierra Canyon (Chatsworth) def. Los Angeles 21–6	Paraclete def. Mater Dei Catholic (Chula Vista) 34–18	Bishop's (La Jolla) def. Valley Christian (Cerritos) 29–8	Bakersfield Christian def. Selma 28–27	St. Anthony (Long Beach) def. Yorba Linda 55–23	Valley View def. San Gorgonio (San Bernardino) 31–14	La Jolla Country Day def. Arroyo (El Monte) 63–42	Rancho Christian def. Franklin (Los Angeles) 56–21	Strathmore def. Horizon Christian Academy (San Diego) 62–22	Not awarded	
2017	Mater Dei (Santa Ana)	Not awarded	Helix (La Mesa) def. Oaks Christian (Westlake Village) 28–13	Narbonne (Los Angeles) def. Paraclete 56–14	Cajon (San Bernardino) def. Rancho Verde (Moreno Valley) 70–23	Grace Brethren (Simi Valley) def. Aquinas 24–8	Bishop Diego (Santa Barbara) def. Quartz Hill 41–7	Steele Canyon (Spring Valley) def. El Modena (Orange) 28–26	Crenshaw (Los Angeles) def. El Camino (Oceanside) 13–10	Southwest (El Centro) def. San Joaquin Memorial (Fresno) 31–28	Golden West (Visalia) def. Big Bear 41–21	Katella (Anaheim) def. Monte Vista (Spring Valley) 36–35	Orange def. Caruthers 46–43 OT	Vincent Memorial (Calexico) def. Huntington Park 40–18	Not awarded	
2018	Mater Dei (Santa Ana)	Not awarded	Cathedral Catholic (San Diego) def. Narbonne (Los Angeles) 24–21	Sierra Canyon (Chatsworth) def. Upland 7–3	Grace Brethren (Simi Valley) def. St. Augustine (San Diego) 28–14	Lawndale def. South Hills (West Covina) 42–14	Lincoln (San Diego) def. Culver City 54–42	Kaiser (Fontana) def. Eisenhower (Rialto) 48–40	Central Valley Christian def. Morse (San Diego) 30–14	Garfield (Los Angeles) def. Kennedy (Delano) 42–10	San Gorgonio (San Bernardino) def. Western (Anaheim) 43–28	San Diego def. Linfield Christian 42–31	Strathmore def. Adelanto 28–7	Orange Glen def. Locke (Los Angeles) 22–14	Santee (Los Angeles)	Not awarded
2019	St. John Bosco (Bellflower)	Not awarded	Sierra Canyon (Chatsworth) def. Helix (La Mesa) 38–20	Corona del Mar (Newport Beach) def. Oceanside 14–7	Aquinas (San Bernardino) def. San Juan Hills (San Juan Capistrano) 24–10	Pacifica (Oxnard) def. Birmingham (Los Angeles) 44–15	El Camino (Oceanside) def. Temecula Valley 34–18	Bakersfield Christian def. Sunny Hills (Fullerton) 42–21	Highland (Palmdale) def. Selma 42–29	La Jolla def. Marina (Huntington Beach) 27–14	El Monte def. Serra (San Diego) 30–18	Reseda def. Esperanza 28–0	South (Torrance) def. Canoga Park 47–28	Bishop Union	Gardena def. Francis Parker (San Diego) 27–13	Not awarded
2020	Not awarded															
2021	Mater Dei (Santa Ana)	Not awarded	Cathedral Catholic (San Diego) def. Lutheran (Orange) 71–62	Serra (Gardena) def. Long Beach Poly 21–17	Mater Dei Catholic (Chula Vista) def. Helix (La Mesa) 24–21	Scripps Ranch (San Diego) def. Valencia (Santa Clarita) 45–38	Aquinas (San Bernardino) def. Newport Harbor 42–28	Birmingham (Los Angeles) def. Patrick Henry (San Diego) 42–35	Central Valley Christian def. Serrano (Phelan) 21–9	Northview (Covina) def. Colony (Ontario) 27–26	Independence (Bakersfield) def. Venice (Los Angeles) 19–14	Righetti (Santa Maria) def. Northwood (Irvine) 14–7	Quartz Hill def. Palo Verde Valley 26–20	Arlington (Riverside) def. El Camino Real 24–14	Morro Bay def. Loara (Anaheim) 35–27	Taft (Los Angeles)
2022	St. John Bosco (Bellflower)	Not awarded	Lincoln (San Diego) def. Sierra Canyon (Chatsworth) 37–14	Liberty (Bakersfield) def. Yorba Linda 41–28	Mater Dei Catholic (Chula Vista) def. Downey 22–21	Granite Hills (El Cajon) def. Etiwanda 41–21	San Jacinto def. University City (San Diego) 49–45	Laguna Hills def. Birmingham (Los Angeles) 35–28	Northwood (Irvine) def. Kennedy (Delano) 10–7	Granada Hills def. Laguna Beach 56–55	Muir (Pasadena) def. Palo Verde 33–7	Shafter def. Walnut 20–16	The Classical Academy (Escondido) def. Lancaster 34–14	San Gabriel def. Kennedy (Granada Hills) 46–34	Mendota	Crenshaw (Los Angeles) def. Whittier Christian 48–7
2023	Mater Dei (Santa Ana)	Not awarded	Mission Viejo def. Granite Hills (El Cajon) 49–21	St. Bonaventure (Ventura) def. St. Augustine (San Diego) 21–20	La Serna (Whittier) def. Orange Vista (Perris) 49–32	Central Valley Christian def. Simi Valley 55–38	Birmingham (Los Angeles) def. Del Norte (San Diego) 30–28	Mayfair (Lakewood) def. Mount Miguel (Spring Valley) 52–21	Jurupa Hills def. Matilda Torres (Madera) 41–14	Mission Oak (Tulare) def. Rio Hondo Prep (Arcadia) 29–14	Ramona (Riverside) def. Torrance 21–16	Banning (Wilmington) def. La Jolla Country Day 41–21	Wasco def. Cerritos 7–6	Sweetwater (National City) def. St. Monica (Santa Monica) 47–27	Fairfax (Los Angeles)	Bell Gardens def. Jordan (Los Angeles) 28–8
2024	Mater Dei (Santa Ana)	Not awarded	Lincoln (San Diego) def. Newbury Park 34–27	Edison (Huntington Beach) def. Granite Hills (El Cajon) 34–28	Narbonne (Los Angeles) def. Pacifica (Oxnard) 37–20	Palos Verdes def. Bakersfield Christian 28–10	Frontier (Bakersfield) def. Murrieta Mesa 39–7	Rio Hondo Prep (Arcadia) def. Poway 28–14	Highland (Palmdale) def. Coalinga 33–31	St. Pius X - St. Matthias Academy def. St. Augustine (San Diego) 28–7	El Capitan (Lakeside) def. Silverado (Victorville) 33–19	Palmdale def. Selma 41–38	Portola (Irvine) def. King/Drew (Los Angeles) 35–34	Monte Vista (Spring Valley) def. Pasadena 41–21	Lindsay def. Chatsworth 35–20	Pioneer (Whittier) def. Panorama 24–0
2025	Santa Margarita Catholic (Rancho Santa Margarita)	Not awarded	Cathedral Catholic (San Diego) def. Los Alamitos 42–20	Pacifica (Oxnard) def. Granite Hills (El Cajon) 42–35	Bakersfield Christian def. La Habra 24–21	Rio Hondo Prep (Arcadia) def. Santa Fe Christian (Solana Beach) 26–21	Ventura def. Arroyo Grande 35–28	Kennedy (Delano) def. Carson 35–33	Barstow def. Immanuel (Reedley) 13–12	Beckman (Irvine) def. Hillcrest (Riverside) 46–40	Christian (El Cajon) def. Valley Christian (Cerritos) 27–13	Bishop Union def. South Gate 47–28	Valley Center def. Valley View 30–19	Morse (San Diego) def. Grace (Simi Valley) 57–40	Woodbridge (Irvine) def. San Fernando 13–0	South El Monte def. Santee (Los Angeles) 56–7
