= CIF Sac-Joaquin Section =

High school athletic organization in California

- Abbreviation: CIF-SJS
- Type: NPO
- Legal status: Association
- Purpose: Athletic
- Region served: Northern California, including Sacramento, Stockton and Modesto areas
- Affiliations: California Interscholastic Federation
- Website: www.cifsjs.org

The Sac-Joaquin Section (SJS) is the governing body of public and private high school athletics in parts of the Northern San Joaquin Valley, California. Its geographic area also covers the California portion of the Lake Tahoe region; however, three schools in that area—North Tahoe, Truckee, and South Tahoe High Schools—are instead members of the Nevada Interscholastic Activities Association due to their relative isolation from other California schools and their proximity to more populated areas in Nevada, especially in the Reno area. It is one of ten sections that compose the California Interscholastic Federation (CIF). The SJS is split into seven divisions, each comprising several leagues.

== Section structure ==
The section is governed by a board of managers, whose voting members include representatives from member leagues, superintendents, school board associations and private schools. There are 174 member schools, assigned to leagues or conferences according to NCS Alignment and Classification Bylaws developed by the schools.

== Divisions and conferences ==
=== Division I ===
==== Delta League (Delta) ====
- Cosumnes Oaks
- Laguna Creek
- Elk Grove
- Franklin (EG)
- Pleasant Grove
- Sheldon
- Monterey Trail

==== Sierra Foothill League (SFL) ====
- Del Oro
- Folsom
- Granite Bay
- Oak Ridge
- Rocklin
- Whitney
- Jesuit (Boys Only)
- St. Francis (Girls Only)

==== Tri-City Athletic League (TCAL) ====
- Lincoln (S)
- Lodi
- Modesto Christian (BKB Only)
- St. Mary's
- Tokay
- Tracy
- West
- Kimball

=== Division II ===
==== Capital Valley Conference (CVC) ====
- Antelope
- Bella Vista
- Inderkum
- Roseville
- River Valley
- Woodcreek
- Yuba City

==== Metropolitan Conference (Metro) ====
- Burbank
- Grant
- Kennedy
- Laguna Creek
- McClatchy
- Monterey Trails
- River City

==== Central California Athletic League (CCAL) ====
- Downey
- Enochs
- Gregori
- Modesto
- Pitman
- Turlock

==== San Joaquin Athletic Association (SJAA) ====
- Bear Creek
- Chavez
- Edison
- Franklin (S)
- Linden
- McNair
- Stagg
- Weston Ranch

=== Division III ===
==== Capital Athletic League (CAL) ====
- Capital Christian
- Christian Brothers
- Del Campo
- El Camino
- Rio Americano
- Sacramento
- Vista del Lago

==== Central California Conference (CCC) ====
- Atwater
- Buhach Colony
- El Capitan
- Golden Valley
- Merced
- Los Banos

==== Foothill Valley League (FVL) ====
- Lincoln (L)
- Nevada Union
- Oakmont
- Placer
- Ponderosa
- West Park

==== Monticello Empire League (MEL) ====
- Armijo
- Fairfield
- Rodriguez
- Vacaville
- Vanden
- Wood

==== Valley Oak League (VOL) ====
- Central Catholic
- East Union
- Manteca
- Oakdale
- Sierra
- River Islands (Frosh and JV only)

=== Division IV ===
==== Golden Empire League (GEL) ====
- Casa Roble
- Dixon
- Mesa Verde
- Mira Loma
- Pioneer
- Rio Linda
- Woodland

==== Greater Sacramento League (GSL) ====
- Cordova
- Florin
- Foothill
- Johnson
- Natomas
- Valley
- West Campus

==== Western Athletic Conference (WAC) ====
- Beyer
- Ceres
- Grace Davis
- Johansen
- Lathrop
- Los Banos
- Mountain House
- Ceres
- Pacheco

=== Division V ===
==== Mother Lode League (MLL) ====
- Amador
- Argonaut
- Bret Harte
- Calaveras
- Sonora
- Summerville

==== Pioneer Valley League (PVL) ====
- Bear River
- Center
- Colfax
- Marysville
- Sutter
- Twelve Bridges
- Wheatland

==== Sierra Valley Conference (SVC) ====
- Bradshaw Christian
- El Dorado
- Galt
- Liberty Ranch
- Rosemont
- Union Mine

==== Trans Valley League (TVL) ====
- Escalon
- Hilmar
- Hughson
- Livingston
- Modesto Christian (No BKB)
- Ripon
- Ripon Christian (BKB Only)
- Riverbank

=== Division VI ===
==== Sierra Delta League (SDL) ====
- Esparto
- Golden Sierra
- Lindhurst
- Highlands
- Rio Vista
- San Juan
- Vacaville Christian

==== Southern Athletic League (SAL) ====
- Delhi
- Denair
- Gustine
- Le Grand
- Mariposa
- Orestimba
- Ripon Christian (No BKB)
- Waterford

=== Division VII ===
==== Central California Athletic Alliance (CCAA) ====
- Big Valley Christian
- Jim Elliot Christian
- Millennium
- Stone Ridge Christian
- Venture Academy

==== Central Valley California League (CVCL) ====
- Delta
- Encina
- Forest Lake Christian
- Foresthill
- Futures
- Sacramento Waldorf
- Victory Christian
- Woodland Christian

==== Mountain Valley League (MVL) ====
- ABLE Charter
- Delta Charter
- Don Pedro
- Holt Academy
- Hughes Academy
- Lodi Academy
- Stockton Christian
- Tioga

==== Northern Pacific Athletic Conference (NPAC) ====
- Westlake Charter High School
- Fortune Early College
- John Adams Academy - Roseville
- Leroy Greene Academy
- Elite Public
- New Life Christian
- Trinity Prep

==== Sacramento Metro Athletic League (SMAL) ====
- Buckingham Charter
- Cristo Rey
- Sacramento Adventist
- Sacramento Country Day
- Valley Christian
- Western Sierra
- Wilton Christian

=== Div. VII Football Conferences ===
Small school, football only division

==== Sacramento Metropolitan Athletic League (SMAL) ====
- Delta
- Encina
- Foresthill
- Valley Christian
- Western Sierra

==== Central California Athletic Alliance (CCAA) ====
- Big Valley Christian
- Delta Charter
- Millennium
- Stone Ridge Christian

== Section Championships ==
The following is a list of the top-10 schools in the section in order of team championships won:

1. Davis Sr. (157)
2. Jesuit (128)
3. Rio Americano (101)
4. St. Francis (99)
5. Placer (86)
6. Granite Bay (82)
7. Vacaville (79)
8. St. Mary's (78)
9. Del Oro (72)
10. Ponderosa (67)
