= List of high schools in San Diego County, California =

This is a list of high schools in San Diego County, California. It includes public and private schools and is arranged by school district (public schools) or affiliation (private schools). These schools offer grades 9 through 12. Junior High schools are not listed here.

== Public schools ==
=== Warner Springs Unified School District ===
- Warner High School, Warner Springs

=== Borrego Springs Unified School District ===
- Borrego Springs High School, Borrego Springs
- Palm Canyon High School (continuation), Borrego Springs

=== Carlsbad Unified School District ===
- Carlsbad High School, Carlsbad
- Carlsbad Village Academy 10–12, Carlsbad
- Sage Creek High School, Carlsbad, Carlsbad

=== Coronado Unified School District ===
- Coronado High School, Coronado
- Palm Academy for Learning, Coronado

=== Escondido Union High School District ===
- Diego Valley Charter High School, Escondido
- Center City High School, Escondido
- Escondido Charter High School, Escondido
- Escondido High School, Escondido
- Orange Glen High School, Escondido
- San Pasqual High School, Escondido
- Valley High School (continuation), Escondido
- Classical Academy High School, Escondido
- Del Lago Academy, Escondido

=== Fallbrook Union High School District ===
- Fallbrook Union High School, Fallbrook
- Ivy High School (continuation), Fallbrook
- Oasis High School (alternative), Fallbrook

=== Grossmont Union High School District ===
- Diego Valley Charter High School, El Cajon
- Chaparral High School (continuation), El Cajon
- El Cajon Valley High School, El Cajon
- El Capitan High School, Lakeside
- Granite Hills High School, El Cajon
- Grossmont High School, La Mesa/El Cajon
- Grossmont Middle College High School, El Cajon
- Helix High School, La Mesa (independent charter high school, authorized by the Grossmont Union HS District)
- Monte Vista High School, Spring Valley
- Mount Miguel High School, Spring Valley
- Santana High School, Santee
- Steele Canyon High School, Spring Valley (independent charter high school, authorized by the Grossmont Union HS District)
- Valhalla High School, El Cajon
- West Hills High School, Santee

=== Julian Union High School District ===
- Julian High School, Julian

=== Mountain Empire Unified School District ===
- Mountain Empire High School, Pine Valley

=== Oceanside Unified School District ===
- Coastal Academy Charter High School, Oceanside
- Diego Valley Charter High School, Oceanside
- El Camino High School, Oceanside
- Oceanside High School, Oceanside
- Pacific View Charter School, Oceanside

=== Poway Unified School District ===
- Abraxas High School, Poway
- Del Norte High School, San Diego
- Mount Carmel High School, San Diego
- Poway High School, Poway
- Rancho Bernardo High School, San Diego
- Westview High School, San Diego

=== Ramona City Unified School District ===
- Montecito High School (alternative), Ramona
- Mountain Valley Academy High School, Ramona
- Ramona High School, Ramona

=== San Diego County Office of Education ===
- Monarch School, San Diego

=== San Dieguito Union High School District ===
- Canyon Crest Academy, San Diego
- La Costa Canyon High School, Carlsbad
- North Coast High School (alternative), Encinitas
- San Dieguito Academy, Encinitas
- Sunset High School (alternative), Encinitas
- Torrey Pines High School, San Diego

=== San Marcos Unified School District ===
- Bayshore Prep Charter School, San Marcos
- Foothills High (alternative), San Marcos
- Mission Hills High School, San Marcos
- San Marcos High School, San Marcos
- Twin Oaks High School (continuation), San Marcos

=== Sweetwater Union High School District ===
- Bonita Vista High School, Chula Vista
- Castle Park High School, Chula Vista
- Chula Vista High School, Chula Vista
- Eastlake High School, Chula Vista
- Hilltop High School, Chula Vista
- MAAC Community Charter School, Chula Vista
- Mar Vista High School, Imperial Beach
- Montgomery High School, San Diego
- Olympian High School, Chula Vista
- Options Secondary School, Chula Vista
- Otay Ranch High School, Chula Vista
- Palomar High School, Chula Vista
- San Ysidro High School, San Diego
- Southwest High School, San Diego
- Sweetwater High School, National City

East Hills Academy

=== Valley Center-Pauma Unified School District ===
- Oak Glen High School (continuation), Valley Center
- Valley Center Adult Education, Valley Center
- Valley Center High School, Valley Center
- Valley Center Independent Study, Valley Center

=== Vista Unified School District ===
- Diego Valley Charter High School, Vista
- Guajome Park Academy (charter), Vista
- Mission Vista High School, Oceanside
- North County Trade Tech High School (charter), Vista
- Rancho Buena Vista High School, Vista
- Vista High School, Vista

=== Warner Unified School District ===
- San Jose Valley Continuation High School, Warner Springs
- Warner Middle / High School, Warner Springs

== Private schools ==
=== Catholic ===
- Academy of Our Lady of Peace
- Saint Augustine High School
- Mater Dei Catholic High School
- Cathedral Catholic High School

=== Episcopal ===
- The Bishop's School, La Jolla

=== Jewish ===
- San Diego Jewish Academy, San Diego
- Southern California Yeshiva High School, San Diego
- Torah High Schools of San Diego, San Diego

=== Lutheran ===
- Victory Christian Academy, San Diego (formerly Lutheran High School of San Diego)

=== Seventh-Day Adventist ===
- Escondido Adventist Academy, Escondido
- San Diego Academy, National City

=== Non-Denominational ===
- Army and Navy Academy, Carlsbad
- Maranatha Christian Schools, San Diego
- Calvin Christian School, Escondido
- Santa Fe Christian Schools, Solana Beach
- Horizon Christian Academy, San Diego
- Horizon Prep School, Rancho Santa Fe
- The Cambridge School, San Diego
- Tri-City Christian School, Tri-City Christian School

=== Nonsectarian ===
- The Child's Primary School, San Diego
- Carlsbad Seaside Academy, Carlsbad
- Carlsbad Village Academy, Carlsbad
- Francis W. Parker School, San Diego
- Fusion Academy, Del Mar
- The Grauer School, Encinitas
- High Bluff Academy, Rancho Santa Fe
- Fusion Academy AKA Futures Academy - California FKA Halstrom High School, San Diego
- La Jolla Country Day School, La Jolla
- Pacific Academy International, Encinitas
- Pacific Ridge School, Carlsbad
- San Diego French American School, La Jolla
- The Waldorf School of San Diego High School, San Diego
- Leeway Sudbury School, San Diego
- High Bluff Academy, San Diego

== Defunct schools ==
- Day-McKellar Prep K-High School, La Mesa. Closed as of December, 2011 due to lack of funding.
- America's Finest Charter School, Talmadge, San Diego. Closed as of June 2026 due to a budget-related board choice.

== See also ==
- List of high schools in California
- List of school districts in California
- List of school districts in California by county
- List of school districts in San Diego County, California
- Primary and secondary schools in San Diego, California
- List of closed secondary schools in California
