= Rio Hondo Preparatory School =

Private Christian school in Arcadia, California, US

Location
- 5150 Farna Avenue; Arcadia, California 91006; United States; 34.0999°N 118.0210°W

Information
- Type: Private Christian
- Established: 1964
- NCES School ID: 00090094
- Principal: Dr. Marsha Johnson
- Grades: 7–12
- Enrollment: 106 (9–12)
- Colors: Red, black, and white
- Athletics conference: CIF Southern Section; Prep League
- Nickname: Kares
- Accreditation: WASC
- Newspaper: Karier
- Website: rhprep.org

Rio Hondo Preparatory School, also known as Rio Hondo Prep, RHP or simply Rio, is a private Christian day school for grades 7–12. Founded in 1964, the campus straddles Arcadia, California and North El Monte, California

== Facilities ==
School facilities include an office building, a classroom building, a gym which opened in February 2012, many athletic facilities and a concession stand.

The Stivers Center is the new gym that opened February 4, 2012. It replaced the old American Savings Pavilion. Construction started in June 2010 by Del Amo Construction. The two-story gym features four locker rooms, classrooms, a stage, training room, offices and a snack bar.

The multi-purpose field, Kare Youth Park in Irwindale, is the main field off campus. The school plays 11-man football, boys and girls soccer and baseball on it. There is a small softball only field also on campus.

== Graduation requirements ==
4 years of English; 3 of Math; 3 of History; 3 of Laboratory Science; 2 of Foreign Language; and 2 of Fine Arts are required. Summer trips are required for graduation through high school.

== Grades/rank ==
Quarter/Semester system, four grading periods per year with grades recorded at the end of each course. However, transcripts are only issued at the end of the semester. Class periods are about 45–50 minutes long and meet five times a week.

== Athletics ==
The Kares compete in the CIF-SS. They compete in the Prep League which includes schools such as Pasadena Poly, Flintridge Prep, Chadwick, and Firebaugh for both boys and girls, and Mayfield and Westridge for girls. The football team has won 14 CIF-SS championships, second most in the CIF-SS. Varsity football made a state semifinal appearance in 2012 and varsity boys basketball made one in 1991. The girls basketball team has won three CIF championships, most recently in 2015. The varsity boys basketball team won their first CIF championship in 2013. The varsity boys baseball and varsity girls softball teams have each made a CIF finals appearance. The football team is moving to the Gold Coast League during the 2020 season, after competing in the Prep League for the past five decades, since the league will only have eight-man football and the school wanted to compete in eleven-man football for the 2020 season.
