= Winters High School =

Winters High School may refer to:

- Winters High School (California) in Winters, California
- Winters High School (Texas) in Winters, Texas
