= Ripon High School =

Ripon High School may refer to:

- Ripon High School (California), Ripon, San Joaquin County, California
- Ripon High School (Wisconsin), Ripon, Wisconsin
