= Classical Academy =

Classical Academy can refer to

- The Classical Academy High School (California)
- The Classical Academy (Colorado)
- Classical Academy, Texas, a member of the Texas Association of Private and Parochial Schools
