= Granite Hills High School (El Cajon, California) =

Public high school in California, United States

Coordinates: 32°48′N 116°55′W

Location
- 1719 East Madison Avenue; El Cajon, California, 92019; United States

Information
- Type: Public secondary
- Established: 1960
- School district: Grossmont Union High School District
- Principal: Eric Jesperson
- Teaching staff: 17.12 (FTE)
- Grades: 9-12
- Enrollment: 2,414 (2023-2024)
- Student to teacher ratio: 141.00
- Campus: Urban
- Colors: Navy blue and Columbia blue
- Rival: Valhalla High School
- Accreditation: Western Association of Schools and Colleges (WASC)
- Newspaper: The Clarion
- Yearbook: Pageant
- Nickname: Eagles
- Website: granite.guhsd.net

Granite Hills High School is a public comprehensive high school in El Cajon, California. It serves students in grades nine through twelve. Opened in 1960, Granite Hills is one of 13 high schools in the Grossmont Union High School District. GHHS is the home of the Eagles. Granite Hills High School has been an IB World School since July 2001; it is a California Distinguished School.

== History ==
In the late 2000s, the school undertook campus construction projects, including renovations to the football field. In 2009, soil testing identified the presence of carcinogenic contaminants on campus; the source was not immediately determined, and similar conditions were reported at other district schools.

In January 2009, the school’s eagle statue was vandalized and destroyed.

=== Shooting ===
Just minutes after lunch ended and fifth period began on March 22, 2001, an 18-year-old former student, Jason Hoffman, arrived on campus with a 12-gauge Mossberg pump-action shotgun (with size 7 or 8 birdshot) and a .22-caliber semi-automatic pistol, opening fire outside the attendance office which also houses the principal and vice principals' offices. Five people were injured by shrapnel or suffered severe symptoms from the traumatic experience, but few victims incurred bullet wounds. Hoffman was shot in the buttocks and jaw. Hoffman was arrested by police officer Rich Agundez, who had been on campus during school hours since the shooting two weeks earlier at Santana High School. Hoffman would later commit suicide by hanging himself from bedsheets in his prison cell on October 29, 2001.

== Athletics ==
Granite Hills offers every California Interscholastic Federation sanctioned sport.

On December 10, 2022, the Granite Hills would defeat San Ramon Valley 31-24 OT for the California State 2-A football title at Saddleback College.

== Notable alumni ==
- Joe Cardona, 2010, NFL, Miami Dolphins long snapper, Super Bowl LI and Super Bowl LIII Champion with the New England Patriots
- Brian Giles, 1989, Major League Baseball right fielder for the Cleveland Indians, Pittsburgh Pirates, and San Diego Padres
- Marcus Giles, 1996, Major League Baseball second baseman, San Diego Padres, Atlanta Braves
- Duncan D. Hunter, 1994, Republican former U.S. Representative of California's 50th congressional district
- Jimmie Johnson, 1993, NASCAR; 7-time (2006, 2007, 2008, 2009, 2010, 2013, 2016) NASCAR Cup Series champion (tied for most all-time with Richard Petty and Dale Earnhardt); 2-time Daytona 500 champion (2006 & 2013); Elected to NASCAR Hall of Fame Class 2024.
- David Lee, 1999, U.S. Olympic Volleyball Team, 2008 and 2012
- John H. Ritter, 1969, award-winning author of young adult novels
- Joe Roth, 1973, former All-American quarterback at the University of California, Berkeley
- Julia Schultz, 1997, model and actress
- Shane Spencer, 1990, Major League Baseball player
- Travis Taijeron, MLB player for the New York Mets
- Tommy Vardell, 1987, NFL San Francisco 49ers, Cleveland Browns and Detroit Lions

== See also ==
- List of high schools in California
- List of high schools in San Diego County, California
- List of high schools in Grossmont Union High School District
- 2001 Santana High School shooting
