= Mater Dei Catholic High School (Chula Vista, California) =

Mater Dei Catholic

Location
- 1615 Mater Dei Drive; Chula Vista, California 91913; United States; 32°37′13″N 116°58′38″W

Information
- Type: Private
- Motto: Latin: Rationabile Obsequium (Spiritual Worship or Rational Service)
- Religious affiliation: Roman Catholic
- Established: 1960; 66 years ago
- NCES School ID: A0900415
- President: Fr. Joaquin Martinez, S.J.
- Grades: TK–12
- Gender: Coeducational
- Enrollment: High school 1040, elementary 450
- Student to teacher ratio: 16:1 (2017–18)
- Campus size: 48 acres (19 ha)
- Colors: Navy Blue & gold
- Mascot: Crusaders
- Team name: Crusaders
- Accreditation: Western Association of Schools and Colleges
- Publication: Crusader Connection MDTV
- Yearbook: The Gauntlet
- Affiliation: Diocese of San Diego
- Website: www.materdeicatholic.org

Mater Dei Catholic (MDCHS) (formerly Marian High School) is a private Catholic TK-12 school in Chula Vista, California, United States. It is located in the Roman Catholic Diocese of San Diego.

== History ==
In 1960, Bishop Charles F. Buddy founded the Diocese of San Diego's first co-educational Catholic high school. It would be built on twenty acres of land donated by Mr. and Mrs. Robert Egger. Seventy young students and a faculty of four embarked on a lasting venture that would become known as Marian High School. These boys and girls carried the hopes and best wishes of many people as they attended classes in a three-room division of St. Charles School across the street from what would become the future campus. In 2002, the Diocese of San Diego decided to upgrade all its secondary campuses. The Diocese chose a new site in Chula Vista and built a new school. In 2007, the name was changed from Marian Catholic High School to Mater Dei Catholic, and the school moved to its present location.

The original campus was located in South San Diego, near the intersection of Coronado Avenue and Thermal Street. Across from Marian Catholic was the parochial K-8 school, Saint Charles Catholic School. The new campus is located in East Chula Vista, in proximity to Otay Ranch Town Center.

== Facilities ==
Its facilities include the Marian chapel, a track and football stadium, baseball and softball diamonds, tennis courts, a full-service 800-seat theater, a competition swimming pool, a basketball/volleyball gym, and an environmentally friendly "earth bench".

== Athletics ==
Mater Dei Catholic High School competes in the Metropolitan – Mesa League under the South Bay League of the CIF San Diego Section. The "Pioneers" have won several team and individual state championships.

MDCHS State Champions
School Year	Athletic	Team	Division	Note
2009	California high school basketball championship	Girls State	Division IV	def. Modesto Christian 54–51
2009	Basketball	Girls Southern California	Division IV	def. The Bishop's School 54–51
2015	List of California state high school football champions	Boys State	Division 5-AA	def. Immanuel (Reedley) 56–21.
2015	Football	Boys Southern California	Division 5-AA	def. Notre Dame (Riverside) 21–14
2021	Basketball	Girls Southern California	Division 2-AA	def. Bishop Alemany (Mission Hills) 56–42
2021	Basketball	Boys Southern California	Division 2-A	def. Central (Fresno) 67–50
2021	Football	Boys State	Division 2-AA	def. Central Catholic (Modesto) 34–25
2021	Football	Boys Southern California	Division 2-AA	def. Helix (La Mesa) 24–21
2022	Football	Boys State	Division 2-AA	def. McClymonds (Oakland) 26–18
2022	Football	Boys Southern California	Division 2-AA	def. Downey 22–21
2025	Basketball	Girls Southern California	Division III	def. El Camino Real 51–38
2025	Volleyball	Boys CIF State Championship	Division IV	.

== Notable alumni ==
- Paul Arriola: professional soccer player who plays as a winger for the Seattle Sounders FC of Major League Soccer (MLS) and represented the United States in international competitions.
- Stanley Daniels: former professional football guard who played in the National Football League (NFL).
- John Carlos Frey (1981): activist, screenwriter, film director, and actor.
- Alejandro Guido: professional soccer player, current player of Club Tijuana in Liga MX.
- José Martínez (2011): professional volleyball player, member of Mexico men's national volleyball team.
- George Milke: former college baseball pitcher.
- Jason Myers (2009): professional football placekicker for the Seattle Seahawks of the National Football League (NFL).
- Mickey Pimentel (2003): former professional football linebacker who played in the National Football League (NFL).
- Mary Salas (1966): former California State Assembly member, 79th District.
- CJ Verdell: former college football running back for the Oregon Ducks.
