= Byron Storer =

American football player and coach (born 1984)

Cleveland Browns
- Title: Special teams coordinator

Personal information
- Born: May 1, 1984 (age 42); Modesto, California, U.S.
- Listed height: 6 ft 1 in (1.85 m)
- Listed weight: 219 lb (99 kg)

Career information
- Position: Fullback (No. 44)
- High school: Central Catholic (Modesto)
- College: California
- NFL draft: 2007: undrafted

Career history

Playing
- Tampa Bay Buccaneers (2007–2009)

Coaching
- Tampa Bay Buccaneers (2010–2011) Assistant special teams coach; San Diego Chargers (2012–2013); Special teams assistant (2012); Assistant linebackers coach (2013); Oakland / Las Vegas Raiders (2018–2021) Special teams assistant; Green Bay Packers (2022–2025) Assistant special teams coach; Cleveland Browns (2026–present) Special teams coordinator

Awards and highlights
- 3× Second-team All-Pac-10 (2004–2006)

Career NFL statistics
- Receptions: 2
- Receiving yards: 3
- Stats at Pro Football Reference

Byron Donald Storer (born May 1, 1984) is an American professional football coach and former fullback who is the special teams coordinator for the Cleveland Browns of the National Football League (NFL). He previously coached for the Green Bay Packers, Tampa Bay Buccaneers, San Diego Chargers, and Las Vegas Raiders. Storer played for the Tampa Bay Buccaneers from 2007 to 2009. He played college football for the California Golden Bears.

== Early life ==
In 2002, Storer graduated from Central Catholic High School in Modesto, California.

== Playing career ==
=== College ===
Storer played at the University of California, Berkeley, and was second-team All-Pac-10 special teams from 2004-2006.

=== National Football League ===
Pre-draft measurables
| Height | Weight |
|---|---|
| 6 ft 0 3/4 in (1.85 m) | 226 lb (103 kg) |
Values from Pro Day

==== Tampa Bay Buccaneers ====
Storer signed with the Tampa Bay Buccaneers in May 2007 and started the final three games of the season, finishing with two receptions for three yards.

An exclusive-rights free agent in the 2009 offseason, Storer was re-signed on March 17. He reached an injury settlement with the Buccaneers on May 17 and was placed on injured reserve.

Storer retired after spending the 2008 and 2009 season on injured reserve due to tearing his ACL.

== Coaching career ==
=== Tampa Bay Buccaneers ===
Storer was hired by the Tampa Bay Buccaneers as an assistant special teams coach. Following the Buccaneers 4-12 record for the 2011 season Raheem Morris and his entire coaching staff were fired.

=== San Diego Chargers ===
In 2012, Storer was hired by the San Diego Chargers as special teams assistant. He was moved to assistant linebackers coach in 2013.

=== Oakland Raiders ===
In 2018, Storer was hired by the Oakland Raiders as special teams assistant.

=== Green Bay Packers ===
On February 15, 2022, Storer was hired by the Green Bay Packers as their assistant special teams coach.

=== Cleveland Browns ===
On February 20, 2026, Storer was hired by the Cleveland Browns as their special teams coordinator under new head coach Todd Monken.
