= Campolindo High School =

Public high school in California, United States

Location
- 300 Moraga Road; Moraga, California 94556; United States; 37°52′01″N 122°07′37″W

Information
- School type: Public high school
- Established: 1962
- School district: Acalanes Union High School District
- CEEB code: 052058
- NCES School ID: 060165000033
- Principal: Robyn Harrison
- Teaching staff: 67.80 (FTE)
- Grades: 9–12
- Enrollment: 1,340 (2024-2025)
- Student to teacher ratio: 19.76
- Colors: Navy blue and red
- Mascot: Cougar
- Newspaper: The Claw
- Website: Official website

Campolindo High School is a public high school located in Moraga, California, United States, and is in the Acalanes Union High School District.

In 2022, Campolindo was ranked 27th in California (and 221st nationally) by U.S. News & World Report.

== Athletics ==
The Campolindo Cougars have programs in men's football, men's/women's volleyball, men's/women's basketball, men's baseball, men's/women's water polo, men's/women's cross country, men's/women's track and field, men's/women's tennis men's/women's swimming and diving, men's/women's soccer, and wrestling.

The women's cross-country team has won seven CIF state championships (2001, 2010, 2013, 2017, 2019, 2021, 2022). The football team has won two CIF state championships (2014, 2016). The men's basketball team has won two CIF state championships (2019, 2020 (co-champions)). The men's cross-country team has won three CIF state championships (2019, 2024, 2025).

Campo has been named the division III school of the year seven times by Cal-Hi Sports, in 2005, 2011, 2012, 2015, 2019, 2020 (D2), and 2022.

== Notable alumni ==
- Conrad Bassett-Bouchard, professional Scrabble player
- Matt Biondi, Olympic swimmer
- Rob Bisel, music producer
- Stephen Bishop, actor
- Alex Breaux, actor
- Paul Faries, professional baseball player
- Sven Gamsky (Still Woozy), musician
- Chip Hale, professional baseball player and coach
- Cary and Michael Huang, animators and YouTubers.
- Erika Henningsen, actress
- Herbie Herbert, music manager and musician
- Jennifer Ketcham (Penny Flame), reality TV star, author, blogger, and adult film actress and director
- Nina LaCour, author
- Aidan Mahaney, basketball player
- James Marvel, minor league baseball player
- Cameron Ochs, musician
- Bryce Pinkham, actor
- Aaron Poreda, professional baseball player
- Stephen Robinson, astronaut
- Peter Rocca, Olympic swimmer
- Carey Schueler, first woman ever drafted by a Major League Baseball team
- Jeff Stevens, professional baseball player
- Giorgio Tavecchio, American football player
- John Torchio, American football player
- Kim Vandenberg, Olympic swimmer
- Peter Varellas, Olympic water polo player
- Jon Zuber, professional baseball player

=== Notable staff ===
- Wayne Franklin, a former professional baseball player, coached the baseball team from 2015 to 2016.
