= Prep League =

High school athletic league in California

The Prep League is a high school athletic league that is part of the CIF Southern Section.

== Members ==
- Chadwick School
- Flintridge Preparatory School
- Mayfield Senior School (girls school)
- Polytechnic School (except football)
- Providence High School
- Rio Hondo Preparatory School (except football)
- Westridge School (girls school)
- Rosemead High School (swimming)

=== Affiliate members ===
- Maranatha High School (swimming and diving)
- Sage Hill School (football)
- Windward School (football)
