= Escondido Charter High School =

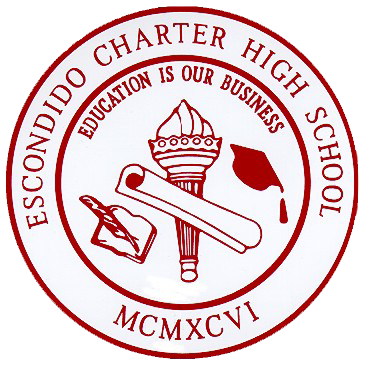

Location
- 1868 East Valley Parkway; Escondido, California 92027; United States; 33.137°N 117.055°W

Information
- Type: Public charter high school
- Motto: Education is Our Business
- Established: 1996
- School board: ECHS Board of Directors
- School district: Escondido Union High School District
- Executive Director: Shawn Roner, M.A.
- Gender: Co-educational
- Enrollment: 765 (2015-16)
- Average class size: 20
- Campus: Academic buildings, 6,500 sq. ft ,lacrosse/soccer/football fields, indoor gymnasium, theater, student union, and outdoor courtyards
- Campus size: 7.8-acre (32,000 m^{2})
- Colors: Maroon, white and Black
- Sports: Soccer, Baseball, Basketball, Wrestling, Volleyball, Swimming, Football, Softball, Golf
- Mascot: White Tiger
- Rivals: Classical Academy
- Accreditation: Western Association of Schools and Colleges
- Newspaper: The Charterian
- Website: https://amhcs.org/echs/

Escondido Charter High School (colloquially referred to as Charter and ECHS) is an independent, co-educational, college preparatory day school in Escondido, California, for grades 9–12. The school opened in 1996 with only 30 students. Since then, the student population has grown to almost 400 in the traditional preparatory program, with over 500 students attending the independent learning program. A Charter education is grounded in a classical "back to basics learning," and the importance of pupil-faculty intellectual discourse. Most classes maintain an average size of 20 students per class.

== Academics ==
Students must complete and pass the California High School Exit Exam, in addition to a final senior thesis that must be sufficiently defended in front of a committee for review.

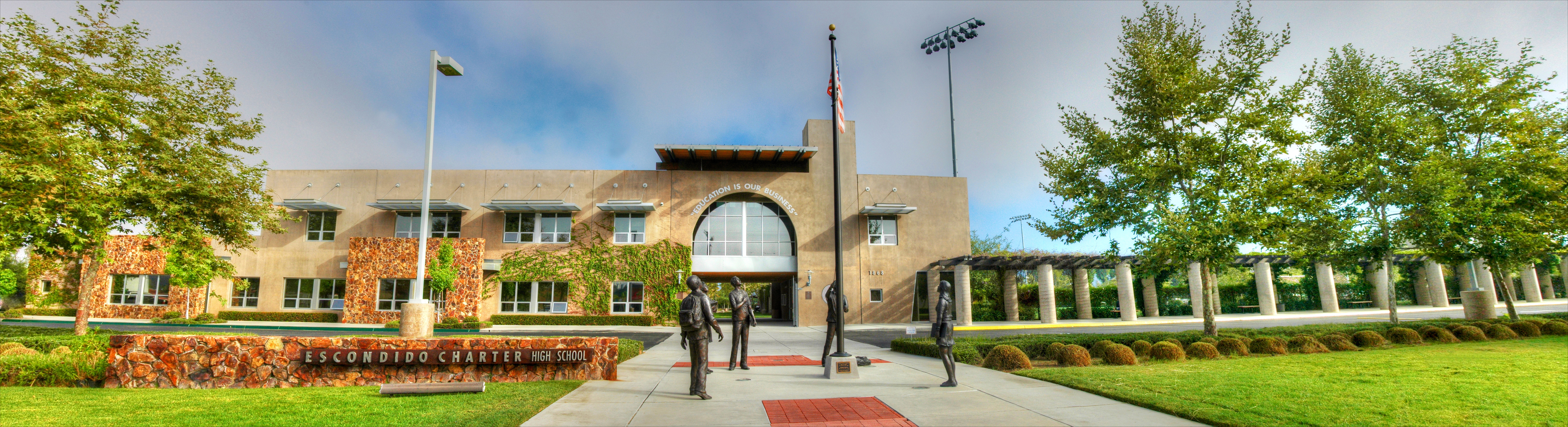

== See also ==
- Dual Enrollment
