= Dan Saleaumua =

American football player (born 1964)

No. 97
- Positions: Defensive tackle, defensive end

Personal information
- Born: November 25, 1964 (age 61); San Diego, California, U.S.
- Listed height: 6 ft 0 in (1.83 m)
- Listed weight: 315 lb (143 kg)

Career information
- High school: Sweetwater (National City, California)
- College: Arizona State
- NFL draft: 1987: 7th round, 175th overall pick

Career history
- Detroit Lions (1987–1988); Kansas City Chiefs (1989–1996); Seattle Seahawks (1997–1998)

Awards and highlights
- First-team All-Pro (1990); Pro Bowl (1995); Second-team All-Pac-10 (1985)

Career NFL statistics
- Sacks: 35.5
- Fumble recoveries: 18
- Interceptions: 3
- Stats at Pro Football Reference

Raymond Daniel Saleaumua (born November 25, 1964) is an American former professional football player who was a defensive tackle in the National Football League (NFL). He played college football for the Arizona State Sun Devils and was selected in the seventh round of the 1987 NFL draft. He played in the NFL for the Detroit Lions, Kansas City Chiefs and Seattle Seahawks.

== Early life ==
Saleaumua was born in San Diego, California. He attended high school at Sweetwater High and attended college at Arizona State University. He played Nose tackle, defensive tackle, and defensive end throughout his college and pro career.

== Professional career ==
Saleaumua played in the NFL for twelve seasons. He was selected by the Detroit Lions in the 7th round (175th overall) of the 1987 NFL draft. He played for the Detroit Lions for two years, 1987 and 1988.

He then played for the Kansas City Chiefs from 1989 to 1996, and finally the Seattle Seahawks in 1997 and 1998. He played in the Pro Bowl in 1995. His fumble recovery record for the Kansas City Chiefs (17) still stands. He graduated from Arizona State in 1997.

== Life after the NFL ==
Saleaumua was the volunteer defensive line coach in 2000 and 2001 for Desert Vista High School in Phoenix, Arizona. In January 2011, he led his team to a commanding 21–8 victory as head coach in the Polynesian All American Classic Bowl game in Los Angeles.

Saleaumua lives in Phoenix, Arizona and Kansas City, Missouri. He has been an entrepreneur and business owner since his NFL career. He is the father of two grown sons.

In January 2019 Dan Saleaumua was inducted into the Polynesian Football Hall of Fame.

== Career statistics ==
Year	AGE	Team	LG	GP	SK	SFY	INT	YDS	LNG	TD	TOT	OWR	OPR	YDS	TD
1987	22	DET	NFL	9	2.0	0	0	0	0	0	0	0	0	0	0
1988	23	DET	NFL	16	2.0	0	0	0	0	0	1	0	0	0	0
1989	24	KAN	NFL	16	2.0	0	1	21	21	0	0	0	5	2	0
1990	25	KAN	NFL	16	7.0	0	0	0	0	0	0	0	6	0	1
1991	26	KAN	NFL	16	1.5	0	0	0	0	0	0	0	2	0	0
1992	27	KAN	NFL	16	6.0	0	0	0	0	0	0	0	1	0	0
1993	28	KAN	NFL	16	3.5	0	1	13	13	0	0	0	1	16	1
1994	29	KAN	NFL	14	1.0	0	0	0	0	0	0	0	1	0	0
1995	30	KAN	NFL	16	7.0	0	1	0	0	0	0	0	1	0	0
1996	31	KAN	NFL	15	0.0	0	0	0	0	0	0	0	0	0	0
1997	32	SEA	NFL	16	3.5	0	0	0	0	0	0	0	1	0	0
1998	33	SEA	NFL	11	0.0	0	0	0	0	0	0	0	0	0	0
12 NFL Season Totals				177	35.5	0	3	34	0	0	1	0	18	18	2

Punts and kickoffs:

Year	AGE	Team	LG	GP	RET	YDS	AVG	FC	LNG	TD	RET	YDS	AVG	LNG	TD
1987	22	DET	NFL	9	0	0	0.0	0	0	0	3	57	19.0	21	0
1988	23	DET	NFL	16	0	0	0.0	0	0	0	1	0	0.0	0	0
1989	24	KAN	NFL	16	0	0	0.0	0	0	0	1	8	8.0	8	0
1990	25	KAN	NFL	16	0	0	0.0	0	0	0	0	0	0.0	0	0
1991	26	KAN	NFL	16	0	0	0.0	0	0	0	0	0	0.0	0	0
1992	27	KAN	NFL	16	0	0	0.0	0	0	0	0	0	0.0	0	0
1993	28	KAN	NFL	16	0	0	0.0	0	0	0	0	0	0.0	0	0
1994	29	KAN	NFL	14	0	0	0.0	0	0	0	0	0	0.0	0	0
1995	30	KAN	NFL	16	0	0	0.0	0	0	0	0	0	0.0	0	0
1996	31	KAN	NFL	15	0	0	0.0	0	0	0	0	0	0.0	0	0
1997	32	SEA	NFL	16	0	0	0.0	0	0	0	0	0	0.0	0	0
1998	33	SEA	NFL	11	0	0	0.0	0	0	0	0	0	0.0	0	0
12 NFL Season Totals				177	0	0	0.0	0	0	0	5	65	13.0	0	0
