= Lenny McGill =

American football player and administrator (born 1971)

Las Vegas Raiders
- Title: Senior national scout

Personal information
- Born: May 31, 1971 (age 55); Long Beach, California, U.S.
- Listed height: 6 ft 1 in (1.85 m)
- Listed weight: 202 lb (92 kg)

Career information
- Position: Cornerback (No. 22, 28)
- High school: Orange Glen (Escondido, California)
- College: Arizona State
- NFL draft: 1994: undrafted

Career history

Playing
- Green Bay Packers (1994–1995); Atlanta Falcons (1996–1997); Carolina Panthers (1998); Seattle Seahawks (1999)*
- * Offseason or practice squad member only

Operations
- Green Bay Packers (2000–2008) Scout; Denver Broncos (2009–2014) Scout; Miami Dolphins (2015–2022) Scout; Las Vegas Raiders (2022–present) Senior national scout

Career NFL statistics
- Tackles: 104
- Sacks: 1
- Interceptions: 4
- Stats at Pro Football Reference

Charles Leonard McGill III (born May 31, 1971) is an American former professional football player who was a cornerback in the National Football League (NFL). He played college football for the Arizona State Sun Devils. He currently is the senior national scout for the Las Vegas Raiders. He played five seasons for the Green Bay Packers, the Atlanta Falcons, and the Carolina Panthers.
