= Grossmont Middle College High School =

Coordinates: 32°48′54″N 117°0′27″W

- Grossmont Middle College High School occupies building 38G on the Grossmont College campus.

Location
- 8800 Grossmont College Dr. El Cajon, California; United States

Information
- Type: Middle College
- Established: 2001
- Founder: Cathy Zemlick
- School district: Grossmont Union High School District
- Grades: 11-12
- Enrollment: 51 (2023-2024)
- Campus: Suburban
- Colors: Green and Yellow (unofficial)
- Mascot: Griffin (unofficial)
- Accreditation: WASC
- Website: Grossmont Middle College

Grossmont Middle College High School (GMCHS) is a high school in San Diego County, California.

Founded in 2001, GMCHS is located on the Grossmont College campus and is run entirely by two teachers, a secretary and a counselor. GMCHS is a WASC-accredited alternative high school, providing a bridge to college education and career training. Juniors and seniors who are capable of succeeding at the college level and who are not challenged by traditional high school work have the opportunity to complete requirements for high school graduation while earning college credits and obtaining job experience. GMCHS used to require internships, but from successful negotiations from the counselor to the district, this requirement is no longer necessary.

Open by application to students living throughout San Diego County, GMCHS best suits bright and mature students interested in a serious learning environment who are out of place in the traditional, comprehensive high school. They take high school English, social studies and study skills courses taught by district instructors while completing an internship in an area related to their chosen career path. In addition, all students are required to complete a minimum of six college credits per semester. These credits either fulfill high school graduation or college general education requirements, or both. Classes taken from the community college generally count for both, but students may need to finish certain high school requirements. (from the GMCHS website)

GMCHS offers the comfort of a small school with big school course offerings; a high school diploma with college credits; a supportive environment with individualized attention; enrichment; challenge; and a head start for the future. (from the GMCHS website)

== See also ==
- Middle College Program
- List of high schools in San Diego County, California
