= Cardinal Newman High School (Santa Rosa, California) =

Private school in Santa Rosa, California, United States

Location
- 4320 Old Redwood Hwy; Santa Rosa, (Sonoma County), California 95403; United States; 38°29′39″N 122°44′29″W

Information
- Type: Private
- Motto: Cor Ad Cor Loquitur (Heart Speaks to Heart)
- Religious affiliation: Roman Catholic
- Patron saint: St. John Henry Newman
- Established: 1964
- Oversight: Roman Catholic Diocese of Santa Rosa, California
- Superintendent: Dr. Linda Norman
- School code: 053-326
- CEEB code: 053326
- President: Dr. Paul Raccanello
- Chaplain: Father Christopher Girolo
- Faculty: 52
- Grades: 9-12
- Enrollment: 613 (2025-2026 <https://www.cardinalnewman.org/academics/gpa-stats>)
- Average class size: 22
- Student to teacher ratio: 13:1
- Education system: College-preparatory
- Campus type: Suburban
- Colors: Cardinal Red and Gold
- Athletics: Baseball, Basketball, Cheer, Cross Country, Flag Football, Football, Golf, Lacrosse, Soccer, Softball, Swimming, Tennis, Track and Field, Volleyball, Beach Volleyball, Water Polo
- Mascot: Cardinal
- Team name: Cardinals
- Accreditation: Western Association of Schools and Colleges
- Publication: The Trinity
- Tuition: $24,300 (2026-27)
- Communities served: Sonoma County
- Affiliation: Ursuline High School
- Website: www.cardinalnewman.org

Cardinal Newman High School is an American Catholic high school located in Santa Rosa, California. The school was originally for boys, but shared some facilities with Ursuline High School for girls; it has been coeducational since Ursuline's closure in 2011. Its colors are Cardinal Red and Gold; its mascot is the cardinal. It is located in the Roman Catholic Diocese of Santa Rosa in California.

In October 2017, the school was significantly damaged by the Tubbs Fire, causing around 15 million dollars worth of damage to the campus. The school collected a 10 million dollar insurance payout, and received an additional 12 million in rebuilding donations.

== History ==
=== 20th century ===
Cardinal Newman High School was founded on April 24, 1964, and named for Cardinal John Henry Newman. It was the brother school of Ursuline High School, a girls' secondary school located on the same road. The campuses shared a common eating area. The schools' academic programs were also intertwined, with most classes for juniors and seniors and some freshman and sophomore language classes taught co-educationally.

The two schools also collaborated on school-sponsored social events such as the drama program. The schools had separate associated student bodies that collaborated in carrying out their duties. Athletics, with the exceptions of cross country, track & field, swimming, and water polo, were not collaborations. The schools had separate offices, libraries, computer labs, classrooms, and gymnasiums, but in addition to the cafeteria, they shared a multipurpose facility and some athletics facilities. Class rankings for Newman and Ursuline were separate, but the students graduated together, with at least one valedictorian and salutatorian from each school addressing their graduation class.

=== 21st century ===
Ursuline announced on November 9, 2010, that it would close at the end of the academic year. Cardinal Newman became coeducational at the start of the 2011–2012 academic year.

== Academics ==
Cardinal Newman's curriculum includes mathematics, starting at pre-algebra to Advanced Placement calculus; sciences, consisting of biology, chemistry, Agricultural Sciences, and physics; English; social studies, including government, economics, and history; Spanish language; and theology. Freshmen are required to complete physical education, basic computer literacy, health, public speaking, and drawing. Advanced placement classes are offered in most subject areas. Electives include psychology, the school newspaper, weight training, Modern Rock Band and Guitar, and advanced art classes. Students take seven courses each school year.

According to the Acton Institute's Catholic High School Honor Roll, Cardinal Newman was one of the top 50 Catholic high schools in the nation for 2005.

== Athletics ==
Keith Dorney, a nine-year offensive lineman with the Detroit Lions assisted the team from 2003 to 2006.

- In the 2005-2006 season, CN football won both NBL and Section 3A champs.
- In 2019, the team recorded a 14-1 record and won the AAA-level state championship in California.

The school also has baseball and basketball teams.

== Notable alumni ==
- Jason Alexander, current professional baseball player, Houston Astros
- Scott Alexander, former professional baseball player, Kansas City Royals, Los Angeles Dodgers, and San Francisco Giants
- Robert C. O'Brien, former National Security Advisor
- Jerry Robinson, former professional football player, Los Angeles Raiders and Philadelphia Eagles, and College Football Hall of Fame inductee
- Stephen Tomasin, professional rugby player, United States Rugby Union
- John Wetteland, former professional baseball player, Los Angeles Dodgers, Montreal Expos, New York Yankees, and Texas Rangers, and World Series Most Valuable Player in 1996 World Series
- Scooby Wright, professional football player, Birmingham Stallions of the United States Football League

== Notable staff ==
In 2005, San Francisco 49ers Hall of Famer Joe Montana became a part-time quarterback coach for the team.
