= Hilmar High School =

Location
- 7807 Lander Avenue; Hilmar, California 95324; United States; 37°24′05″N 120°51′05″W

Information
- School type: Rural
- Established: 1911
- School district: Hilmar Unified School District
- Principal: Melissa Brewer
- Grades: 9–12
- Gender: M/F
- Enrollment: 698 (2023-2024)
- Colors: Green and gold
- Athletics: CIF Sac-Joaquin Section
- Athletics conference: Trans Valley League
- Mascot: Yellowjacket
- Website: http://hhs.hilmarusd.org/

Hilmar High School serves students from the rural community of Hilmar and Stevinson, California, United States.

== History ==
Hilmar High School was founded in 1911, and was originally known as Hilmar Colony Union High School. There were 26 students the first year. Classes were originally held on the second floor of an elementary school. The high school moved into its own brick building in 1919, and then to its current campus in 1957.

Future Farmers of America (FFA) has been active at the school since 1930.

It is part of the Hilmar Unified School District, which is a K-12 rural school district with approximately 2277 students. The district operates five schools: Hilmar High School, Irwin and Colony High School, Hilmar Middle School, Elim Elementary School, and Merquin Elementary School.

== Extracurricular activities ==
Much of the community revolves around the high school's sports and agricultural programs. The school has had particular success with its FFA activities, including several national championships.

== Athletics ==
Hilmar High School belongs to the Trans Valley League in the Sac-Joaquin Section of the California Interscholastic Federation. The school's teams, known as the Hilmar Yellowjackets, compete in: baseball, basketball, cross country, football, golf, soccer, softball, tennis, track, volleyball, swimming and wrestling.

== Notable alumni ==
- Nate Costa
- Dot Jones
- Lee Neves- Principal Owner, Stockton Cargo Soccer Club (https://www.stocktonsc.com/about-us/) & Nationally recognized Political Consultant (https://www.24-7pressrelease.com/press-release/504260/lee-neves-honored-by-marquis-whos-who-for-excellence-in-political-consultancy)
