= Orange Glen High School =

Coordinates: 33.129°N 117.042°W

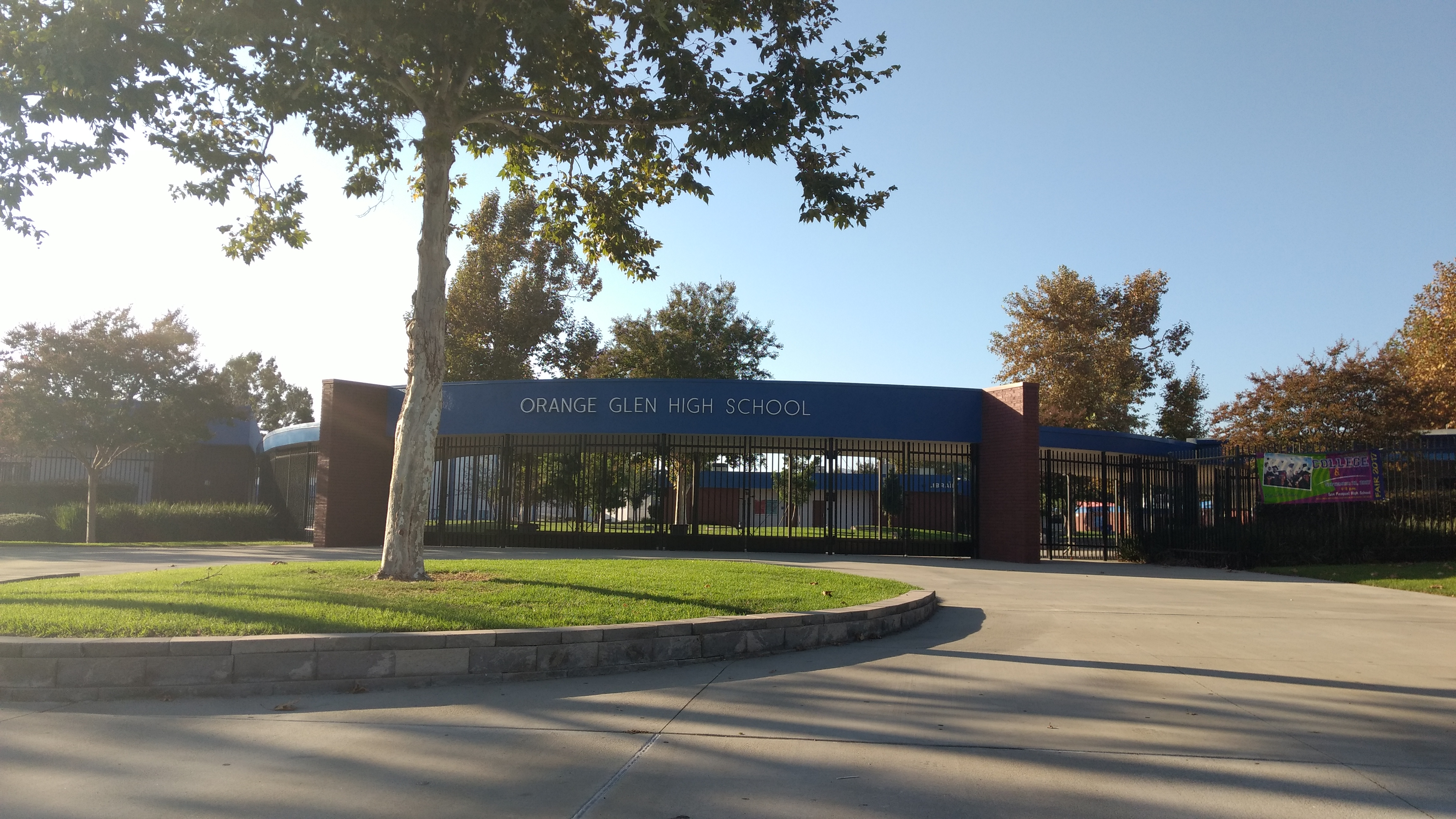
- Main entrance

Location
- 2200 Glenridge Rd; Escondido, California 92027

Information
- Type: Public
- Established: 1961; First graduating class 1964
- School district: Escondido Union High School District
- Principal: Stacey Adame
- Staff: 97.11 (FTE)
- Enrollment: 1,871 (2023–2024)
- Student to teacher ratio: 19.27
- Colors: Blue, red, and white
- Slogan: "Once a Patriot, Always a Patriot"
- Mascot: Patriot
- Newspaper: The Musket
- Website: http://www.orangeglenhigh.org/

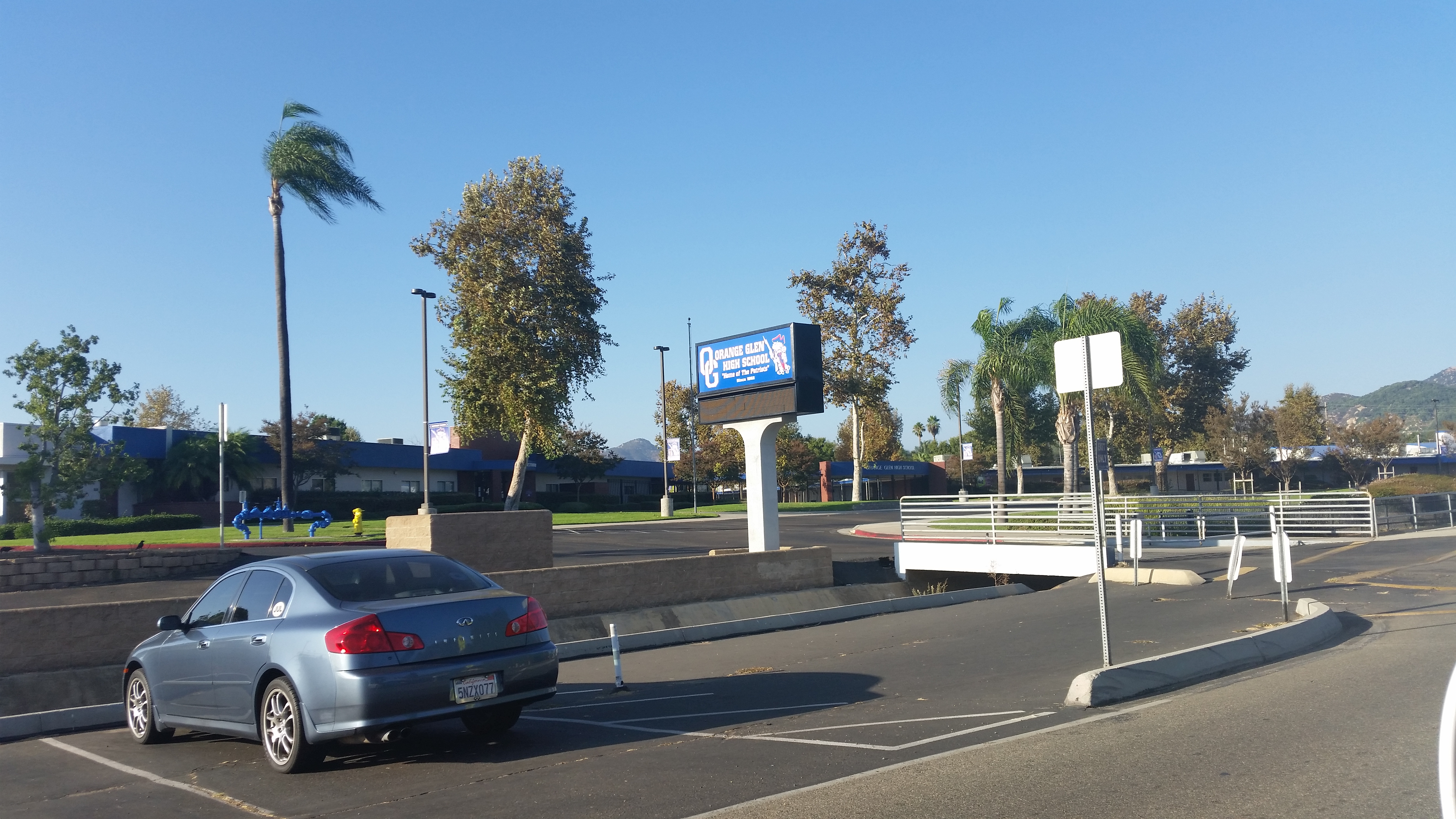
South exterior of Orange Glen High School

Orange Glen High School (OGHS) is one of the five public high schools in the Escondido Union School District in Escondido, California. It was established in 1962. The school earned the California Distinguished School Award in 2007.

In the 2005-06 school year Orange Glen High School served 2,370 students from grades 9 to 12. It has six academic counselors. The school's yearbook is known as The Torch. The Musket school newspaper is part of the High School National Ad Network.

== Athletics ==
Orange Glen High School is a Division II school and a member of the Valley League of CIF San Diego Section.

Fall (August)	Winter (November)	Spring (February)
High school football; Girls Field hockey; Girls Flag Football; Girls & Boys Cross Country; Girls Volleyball; Girls Golf; Girls Tennis; Boys Water Polo	Girls & Boys Basketball; Girls Water Polo; Soccer; Wrestling; Cheer	Boys Tennis; Football; Boys Volleyball; Girls & Boys Swimming; Boys Golf; Boys Baseball; Girls Softball; Track & Field; Beach Volleyball

- In 2009 and 2010, the Orange Glen Drum Majors earned the Field Conducting Championship in World Drum Major Association (WDMA.)

== Notable alumni ==
- Janese Swanson, co-developer of the Carmen Sandiego educational games, and founder of the company Girl Tech

=== Athletics ===
- Ken Block, rally car driver and founder of DC Shoes
- Lenny McGill, former football player and current Denver Broncos scout
- Brett Salisbury, college football player and author
- Sean Salisbury (1981), football player and ESPN broadcaster

== Notable staff ==
- Mike Solari, current Offensive Line Coach with New York Giants NFL Hall of Famer and former Oakland Raider Fred Biletnikoff

== See also ==
- List of high schools in San Diego County, California
