= Cesar Chavez High School (Stockton, California) =

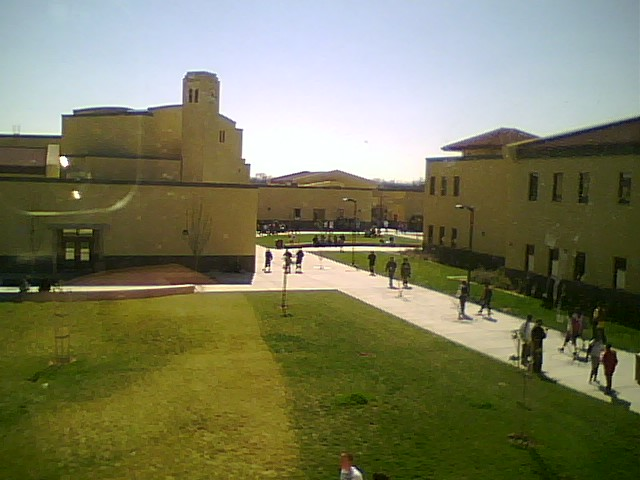
- Art (F) and D building

Location
- 2929 Windflower Ln; Stockton, California 95212; United States; 38.01321°N 121.2677°W

Information
- School type: Public secondary school
- Established: 2005
- School district: Stockton Unified School District
- Principal: Cynthia Cardenas Sanchez
- Staff: 88.86 (on an FTE basis)
- Grades: 9–12
- Enrollment: 2,018 (2023-2024)
- Student to teacher ratio: 22.71
- Color
- Mascot: Titan
- Website: chavez.stocktonusd.net

Cesar Chavez High School is a public four-year high school in Stockton, California. It is part of the Stockton Unified School District.

== History ==
Cesar Chavez High School was completed and began educating students in August 2005. It is the newest high school in Stockton Unified School District in the last 50 years. The school was dedicated on August 18, 2005. The school initiated its first classes in August 2005 starting with only Freshman and Sophomore classes, then added a Junior class during the 2006–07 school year with the addition on the school's first varsity teams.

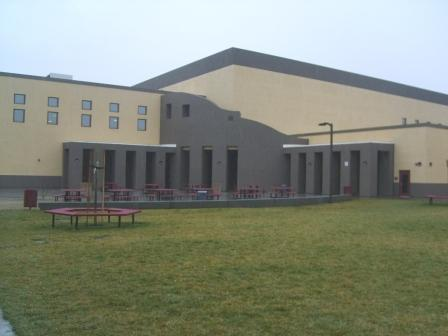
The lunch area

== Notable alumni ==
- Henry Galinato, professional basketball player
