= Mayfield Senior School =

Mayfield Senior School of the Holy Child Jesus

Location
- 500 Bellefontaine Street; Pasadena, Los Angeles County, California 91105; United States; 34°7′49″N 118°9′41″W

Information
- Type: Private
- Motto: "Actions Not Words"
- Religious affiliations: Roman Catholic; Society of the Holy Child Jesus
- Established: 1931
- Founder: Society of the Holy Child Jesus
- Head of school: Laura Farrell
- Grades: 9–12
- Gender: Girls
- Average class size: 16
- Student to teacher ratio: 7:1
- Campus size: 7.5 acres (30,000 m^{2})
- Colors: Red, brown and white
- Athletics conference: CIF Southern Section (Prep League)
- Sports: 23 teams
- Team name: Cubs
- Accreditation: Western Association of Schools and Colleges
- Newspaper: Crier www.mayfieldcrier.org
- Yearbook: Crossroads
- Tuition: $33,800
- Website: www.mayfieldsenior.org

Mayfield Senior School is an independent Catholic college preparatory school, founded in 1931 for young women grades 9–12. It is sponsored by the Society of the Holy Child Jesus, a member of the Holy Child Network of Schools and is guided by the educational philosophy of the Society's foundress, Cornelia Connelly.

== Description ==
Mayfield is affiliated with the Roman Catholic Archdiocese of Los Angeles. The total enrollment is about 330, with a 1:7 faculty/student ratio, an average class size of 15, has a 100% college acceptance rate and is 52% ethnically diverse. The school located at 500 Bellefontaine Street in Pasadena, California. It offers nine Conservatory of the Arts programs and 23 competitive teams in 12 sports.

== History ==
Mayfield School was founded in 1931 by the Society of the Holy Child Jesus at the invitation of John Joseph Cantwell, then the Bishop of Los Angeles-San Diego (as the Archdiocese of Los Angeles was then known as). In 1950, the school split into Senior and Junior Schools due to space constraints and zoning regulations. The Junior School (K - 8) remains on the original Euclid Avenue campus while the Senior School (high school) moved to its current location on Bellefontaine Street. The Senior School remains girls-only while the Junior School became coeducational after the split.

== Academics ==
It offers 28 AP classes. Students take classes in eight different subject areas: English, Fine Arts, World Languages, Mathematics, Physical Education, Theology, Science, and Social Studies.

Mayfield is accredited by the Western Association of Schools and Colleges. The school is also a member of:

- The Holy Child Network of Schools
- The National Association of Independent Schools
- The California Association of Independent Schools
- The National Coalition of Girls' Schools
- The National Catholic Education Association
- The College Entrance Examination Board
- The National Association for College Counseling
- The Western Association for College Admission Counseling
- The Educational Records Bureau
- The Pasadena Area Independent Schools Association
- Council for the Advancement and Support of Education

Mayfield has two full-time college counselors that help every student through the college application process. College counseling is an extension of Mayfield education and each student has access to both counselors. Both counselors stay current and up to date with their knowledge by touring colleges each year. This helps give the girls the best opportunity to fit the school with the best "fit".

== Strub Hall ==
Originally known as the Marshallia mansion, Strub Hall, on Grand Avenue, was built in 1919. It became Mayfield's Bellefontaine campus home in 1950, having been gifted by Dr. Charles H. Strub and his wife, Vera.

== Appearances in popular culture ==
Mayfield has also served as a filming location for many TV shows and movies, such as Marvel’s Runaways, The Lost World: Jurassic Park , The Nutty Professor, All About Steve, and Legally Blonde.
