= Central Valley Christian Schools =

Location
- 5600 West Tulare Avenue; Visalia, California 93277; United States; 36°19′14″N 119°21′9″W

Information
- Type: Private
- Established: 1979
- Superintendent: Darryl De Ruiter
- Grades: Pre K–12
- Enrollment: 1,206 (2023)
- Colors: Navy blue, Columbia Blue and white
- Nickname: Cavaliers
- Website: www.cvc.org

Central Valley Christian Schools is a private Christian school in Visalia, California, United States. It was established as an elementary school in 1979 with a high school being added in 1982. It is accredited by both the Western Association of School & Colleges and Christian Schools International.

== Notable alumni ==
- Stephen Vogt, Major League Baseball player. World Series Champion (2021 - Atlanta Braves)
