= Vincent Memorial Catholic High School =

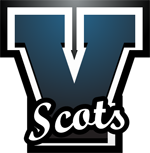

Location
- 525 West Sheridan Avenue; Calexico, (Imperial County), California 92231; United States; 32°40′39″N 115°30′22″W

Information
- Type: Private, Coeducational
- Motto: Benedictus Deus (Blessed Be God)
- Religious affiliations: Roman Catholic; Sister Servants of the Blessed Sacrament
- Established: 1949
- Principal: Sister Guadalupe Hernandez SJS
- Teaching staff: 14.1 (on an FTE basis)
- Grades: 9–12
  - Grade 9: 72
  - Grade 10: 50
  - Grade 11: 65
  - Grade 12: 58
- Student to teacher ratio: 17.4
- Colors: Navy Blue, White and Gold
- Athletics conference: San Diego Southern Conference
- Mascot: Scots
- Team name: The Scots
- Accreditation: Western Association of Schools and Colleges
- Newspaper: Scots' News
- Athletic Director: Jesus Gonzalez
- Website: www.vmchs.com

Vincent Memorial Catholic High School is a private, Roman Catholic high school in Calexico, California. It is located in the Roman Catholic Diocese of San Diego The school serves approximately 300 students.

== Background ==
Vincent Memorial was established in 1949 as Our Lady of Guadalupe Academy, (OLGA) an all-girls school. High School moved, to its present location in 1966, became coeducational, and was renamed Jean B. Vincent Memorial High School (who was a priest who served the parish of Guadalupe in Calexico for many years, and also the nuns and students of that school). In 2002, the school was renamed Vincent Memorial Catholic High School to better reflect the Catholic identity. It is staffed by the Sister Servants of the Blessed Sacrament.

== Academics ==
Graduation Requirements

Students are required to take a full load of seven courses per semester. Each course is worth five (5) units per semester. A student may earn thirty-five (35) units in the first semester and thirty-five (35) units in the second semester for a total of seventy (70) units per school year. A student must earn a minimum of 260 units to graduate.

Students must pass core curriculum courses at VMCHS. A student who receives an “F” grade receives no credit for that course. The student must make up the credits. Religion, English and Math core courses must be repeated at VMCHS. Teachers may request mandatory after school tutoring for students with deficiencies (D or F) in any given grading period until grade becomes satisfactory (C or better). The eight-semester religion requirement does include the Christian Service component. This component is managed through the Religious Studies department. Students will be assigned community service according to grade level, and service component will be 10% of final semester grade for freshmen, sophomores and juniors. In addition, participation in a structured Christian service program is a requirement for graduation and may be completed prior to senior year.

Courses Required Classes

These are core courses required for graduation – An “F” for the semester grade cannot be received in the following courses in order to graduate.

- 4 years of Religion/Family Life
- 4 years of English
- 1 semester of Speech
- 3 years of Math*, which include: Algebra I, Geometry and Algebra II
- 3 years of Social Studies, which include: World History, U. S. History, 1 semester of Economics and 1 semester of U.S. Government
- 2 and 1/2 years of Science* include: 1 year of Biology, 1 semester of Health, and 1 year of Physics or Chemistry
- 2 years of Foreign Language
- 2 years of Physical Education***P.E. credits may be substituted upon request by participating in one or more interscholastic sports by semester
- If planning to attend a UC university, one year of Fine Arts is required.

*Requirements for Mexico may vary

Elective Courses offered

- AP English IV
- AP Psychology
- AP United States Government and Politics
- AP US History
- AP World History: Modern
- AP Spanish/Literature III
- Accounting I
- Accounting II
- Business/Accounting
- Geography
- Junior/Senior Health
- Trigonometry and Calculus
- Physics
- Chemistry
- Anatomy/Physiology

College Credit Courses

Any student may take elective courses as long as they do not interfere with the VMCHS core curricular program, and previous administrative approval has been obtained.

Semester Exams

All grades for each semester are cumulative; that is, the work of each nine weeks is counted into the overall average grade of the semester. Semester examinations are required for all students at VMCHS, and they constitute a percentage of the semester grade, as indicated by the syllabus for each course. At the teacher’s discretion, any student maintaining a 98% or higher average and good conduct during the whole semester may be exempted from having to take the semester final exam for that course.

Each semester, a special schedule is set up for administering of exams in each academic subject. Failure to take any semester exam on the scheduled date will result in loss of credit for that exam. A physician’s letter is required to make up a semester exam if the exam was missed because of illness. All other justified absences must obtain Administrative approval and make arrangements prior to exam date.

Standardized Testing Program

Freshman, sophomores and juniors will take Preliminary Scholastic Assessment Test PSAT

Juniors and seniors will take Armed Services Vocational Aptitude Battery ASVAB at school every other year, and the Scholastic Assessment Test SAT independently.

== Sports ==
Vincent Memorial Catholic High School offers the following sports:

Fall Sports: Cross Country (Boys and Girls): Varsity Football (Boys): Junior Varsity Football (Boys): Junior Varsity Tennis (Girls): Varsity Volleyball (Girls): Varsity, Junior Varsity Cheerleading (Girls)

Winter Sports: Basketball (Boys): Varsity, Junior Varsity and Freshmen. Basketball (Girls): Varsity Soccer (Boys and girls) Varsity Spring Sports: Baseball (Boys): Varsity Softball (Girls): Varsity Golf (Boys): Varsity Tennis (Boys): Varsity Track and Field Volleyball (Boys)

All athletic events and teams are subject to the rules and regulations of the California Interscholastic Federation. Vincent Memorial High is affiliated with the San Diego Southern Conference and participates in the Imperial Valley and Manzanita Leagues.
