= Delta Charter High School =

Coordinates: 37.6682°N 121.3245°W

Location
- 31400 S. Koster Road; Tracy, California 95304; United States

Information
- Type: Public
- Motto: "One student at a time, where success is the only option"
- Established: 2001
- Principal: Cristy Rickets
- Grades: K-12
- Enrollment: 450
- Colors: Green and Silver
- Mascot: Dragon
- Website: https://www.deltacharter.net/en-US

Delta Charter High School (DCHS) is located on the outskirts of Tracy, California. DCHS has a student population of about 300. It is a Charter School focused on balancing a mix of both independent study and classroom instruction, and is accredited by the Western Association of Schools and Colleges. It also tailors "Personal Learning Plans," or "PLPs," for each individual student to maximize their learning experience. DCHS has an active Speech and Debate team, competing in the National Forensic League and in YFL tournaments. It also has volleyball, basketball, and soccer teams.
