= Sonora Union High School =

Location
- 430 North Washington Street; Sonora, California 95379; United States
- 37.991187°N 120.386063°W

Information
- School type: Public high school
- School district: Sonora Union High School District
- Principal: Karen Sells
- Teaching staff: 37.79 (FTE)
- Grades: 9–12
- Enrollment: 960 (2023-2024)
- Student to teacher ratio: 25.40
- Colors: Green and yellow
- Mascot: Wildcat
- Website: Sonora High School

Sonora Union High School, also known as Sonora High School, is a public high school in Sonora, California. It is a part of and the largest school in the Sonora Union High School District.

== History ==
The first school in Tuolumne County was located in Sonora, established June 1852. The second legislative session of the California legislature in 1855 when it received funding from the state. SHS's predecessor, the Tuolumne County High School, was opened in 1902 and held its first classes in the basement of the old Sonora courthouse. In 1915, the Tuolomne County High School was named as the Sonoran Union High School. The school board of trustees voted to rename the school Sonora High School in 1982. The use of the official name for the school was so scarce, the school clerk reported no expenses would be incurred bringing labels up to date.

In 1916 students at Sonora Union founded a real, legal bank.

In 1920 funds were raised to build a new gymnasium at a cost of $12,000.

== Notable alumni ==
- Phil Coke (2001), former baseball player
