= Sweetwater High School (National City, California) =

Public high school in National City, California, United States

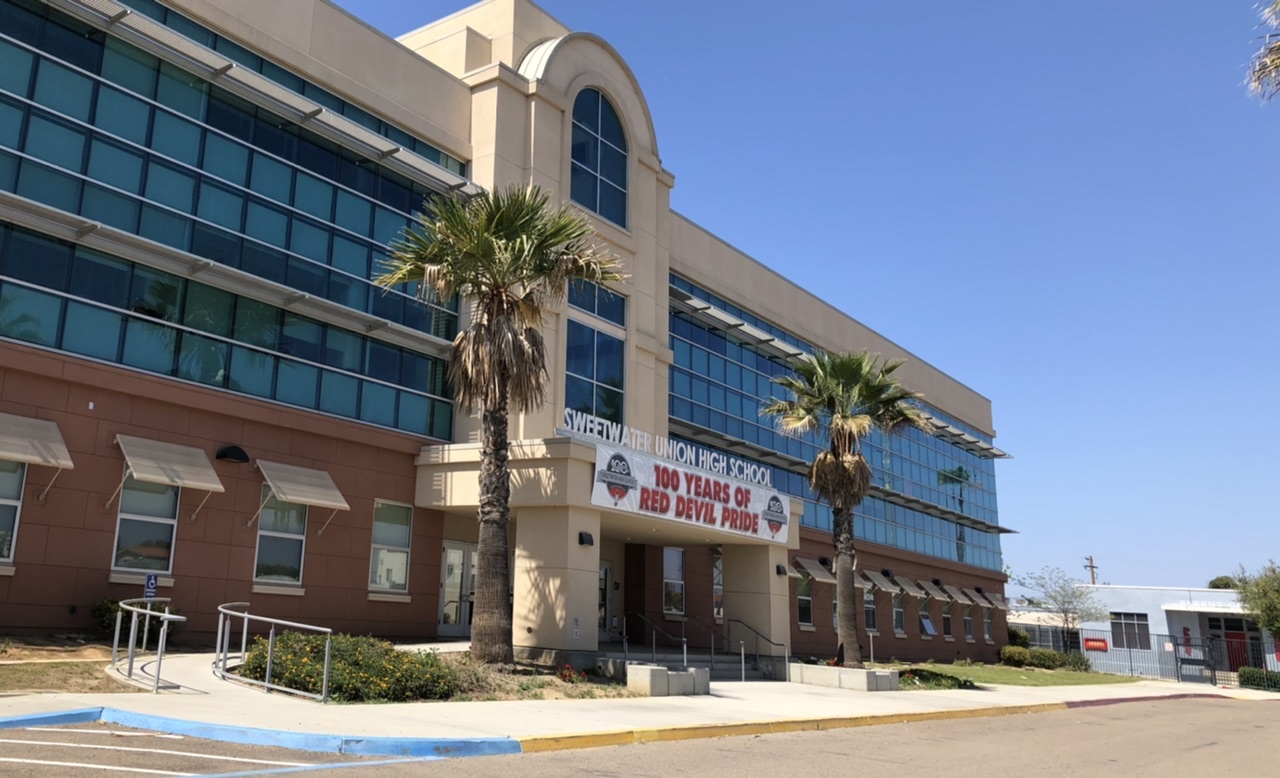
- Main entrance to the Administration Building as seen off of Highland Ave.

Location
- 2900 Highland Ave. National City, California 91950; United States; 32°39′34″N 117°05′37″W

Information
- Type: Public high school
- Motto: “in our Hearts SUHi LIVES!”
- Established: 1920; 106 years ago
- School district: Sweetwater Union High School District
- Superintendent: Moisés G. Aguirre
- Principal: Joe Lara
- Teaching staff: 99.58 (FTE)
- Grades: 9–12
- Enrollment: 2,425 (2023-2024)
- Student to teacher ratio: 24.35
- Colors: Cardinal; White; Gray
- Mascot: Captain Inferno
- Nickname: Red Devils
- Newspaper: The Devils Advocate
- Yearbook: Red & Gray
- Feeder schools: Granger Junior High School; National City Middle School
- News: Red Devils Review
- Website: suh.sweetwaterschools.org

Sweetwater High School (SUHI or SUH) is a high school in National City, California, United States. Established in 1920, it is one of the oldest high schools in San Diego County. The flagship of Sweetwater Union High School District, SUHI predominantly serves the National City community with an enrollment of 2,675 students.

== History ==
Built in 1882 near the present site of Central Elementary School at 9th Street and E Avenue, National School was the South Bay's first high school. National's successor, National City High School, was built in 1908 around that same location, where Central Elementary School now stands. To accommodate the growing population of high school students, Sweetwater Union High School was built in 1921 at 2900 Highland Avenue. The present-day administration building was originally two stories with the library upstairs.

== School structure ==
The campus houses the main administration building, library, theater, counseling center, classrooms, and athletic facilities.

=== Demographics ===
Based on the 2013–2014 school year, 99% of SUHI's student body is "minority enrollment", with 87% coming from economically disadvantaged households, determined by eligibility for California's reduced-price meal program. Approximately 25.5% of students are English Language Learners and 12.8% are students with disabilities.

== Curriculum ==
SUHI provides a standard California high school curriculum. Electives include the arts, technology, and career pathways. Advanced Placement courses are offered for college credit.

== Extracurricular activities ==
Students participate in athletics, clubs, performing arts, and student governance. The school maintains programs in soccer, American football, and track and field.

== Campus ==
The campus underwent a major renovation funded by California Proposition O in the late 2000s. Upgrades included a three-story building containing classrooms, administration offices, library, theater, and counseling center, completed in 2011. A new gymnasium was added in the early 2000s, It's as a blueprints where used for other Sweetwater Union High School District school's gyms. Originally, 80% of the campus was proposed to be renovated, but only the new building and gym were completed due to district “pay-to-play” scandal contracting controversies.

== Awards and recognition ==
In 2009, SUHI was listed among the top 1,500 public high schools by Newsweek. In 2016, it ranked 2,065th on U.S. News & World Report’s list of best high schools.

== Notable alumni ==
- Orley Ashenfelter - Class of 1960; professor of economics at Princeton University
- Chris Combs - Class of 1976; former NFL and USFL football player
- Joe Corona - Class of 2008; former professional soccer player and U.S. men's national team member
- Roberto de la Madrid - Governor of Baja California from 1977 to 1983
- Rebekah Del Rio - Class of 1985; recording artist on several motion picture soundtracks
- Gail Devers - Class of 1984; sprinter, two-time Olympic 100m champion in National Track and Field Hall of Fame
- Robert Lopez - Class of 1977; singer-songwriter known as El Vez
- Corky McMillin - Businessman, philanthropist and off-road racer
- Gino Minutelli - Class of 1982; former MLB baseball player
- Vidal Nuño - Class of 2005; MLB baseball player
- James Primus - Class of 1983; former NFL football player
- Dan Saleaumua - Class of 1982; former NFL football player
