= Monte Vista High School (Spring Valley, California) =

Public high school in California, United States

Coordinates: 32°44′10.42″N 116°58′29.87″W

Location
- 3230 Sweetwater Springs Boulevard; Spring Valley, California 91977; United States

Information
- Type: Public comprehensive secondary
- Motto: This is Monarch Territory
- Established: September 17, 1961
- School district: Grossmont Union High School District
- Principal: Joel Tropp
- Teaching staff: 76.87 (FTE)
- Grades: 9–12
- Enrollment: 1,543 (2024–2025)
- Student to teacher ratio: 20.07
- Campus: Suburban
- Colors: Crimson and gold
- Mascot: Monty the Lion
- Team name: Monarchs
- Accreditation: Western Association of Schools and Colleges (WASC)
- Website: monarchs.guhsd.net

Monte Vista High School is public, comprehensive high school located in Spring Valley, California, and serves 1,960 students in grades nine through twelve. Opened in 1961, Monte Vista is the seventh of twelve high schools built in the Grossmont Union High School District.

== Students ==
Monte Vista's student body is composed of pupils from the following ethnic backgrounds (2015–2016 school year):

- American Indian or Alaska Native – 0.1%
- Asian – 4.7%
- Black – 12.3%
- Hispanic – 59.7%
- Native Hawaiian or Pacific Islander – 0.8%
- White (not Hispanic) – 15.5%
- Two or More – 6.9%

== Extracurricular activities ==
=== Athletics ===
Monte Vista's athletic teams, the Monarchs, compete in the South League of the Grossmont Conference and the California Interscholastic Federation (CIF) San Diego Section. Monte Vista offers a total of 21 Sports over a span of 3 Athletic seasons.

Fall	Winter	Spring
High school football; Cross Country; Girls Volleyball; Girls Golf; Girls Tennis; Boys Water Polo	Girls & Boys Basketball; Girls Water Polo; Soccer; Wrestling; Cheer	Boys Tennis; Boys Volleyball; Girls & Boys Swimming; Boys Golf; Boys Baseball; Softball; Track & Field; Gymnastics; lacrosse

== Notable alumni ==
- Jessica Aber, 1999, attorney
- Nick Cannon, 1998, rapper and actor
- Florence Choe, 1991, navy officer
- Brooks Conrad, 1998, Major League Baseball player
- Carly Craig, 1998, actress and producer
- Erika Davies, 1999, American jazz vocalist and actress
- Larry Moore (American football)
- Royce Ring, 1999, Major League Baseball player
- Alexandra Slade, 2012, actress
- B.Slade, 1993, gospel singer
- Fred Stanley, 1966, Major League Baseball player
- Simon Tam, 1999, author, musician, activist, and entrepreneur.
- Mike Whitmarsh, 1980, professional volleyball player and Olympic silver medalist (1996)
- Michael Wiley, 1996, NFL football player

== See also ==
- List of high schools in San Diego County, California
