= Sierra High School (Manteca, California) =

Location
- 1700 Thomas Street; Manteca, California 95337; United States; 37.7926°N 121.2434°W

Information
- School type: Public
- Established: August 1994
- School district: Manteca Unified School District
- Principal: Steve Clark
- Teaching staff: 72.27 (FTE)
- Enrollment: 1,674 (2024-25)
- Student to teacher ratio: 23.43
- Colors: Blue and Gray
- Fight song: Timberwolves, Go, Fight, Win!
- Mascot: Timberwolf
- Rivals: Manteca High School, East Union High School
- Website: sierrahigh.mantecausd.net

Sierra High School is a public high school located in Manteca, California, opened in August 1994.

== Sports ==
Sierra High School is part of the Valley Oak League, of the CIF Sac-Joaquin Section.

It has 12 athletic teams - track, cross country, wrestling, soccer, basketball, football, baseball, softball, swimming, golf, water polo, and tennis. They have won 20 Sac-Joaquin Section Championships, 3 in cross country, 8 in track, 4 in women's soccer, 3 in softball, 1 in boys basketball, and 1 in football.

During the 2014–15 school year, Sierra became the first school in the history of the Valley Oak League to win league titles in the traditional "Big 3" sports of football, basketball and baseball during the same school year. This year also marked the first Sac-Joaquin Section title for the boys basketball team. Sierra's basketball team won four league titles in a row, 2012–15.

In the fall of 2015, the football team won its first Sac-Joaquin Section football title and followed that with a CIF State division IVA title by beating Chowchilla HS 20–15 on a score with 54 seconds left in the game. In the fall of 2019, the football team won its second Sac-Joaquin Section football title by beating Oakdale High School 22–19, after losing to Oakdale 38-14 during the regular season. Sierra High School finished 3-3 in the Valley Oak League, having lost to Manteca High School, Central Catholic High School, and Oakdale High School qualifying for the Division 4 CIF Playoffs.

== Academic rallies ==
Rallies are held twice a year for students with grade point averages above 2.25, 3.25 and with 4.0's. They are referred to as Lobo Blue (2.25), Lobo Silver (3.25) and Lobo Gold (4.0).

== Notable alumni ==
- Joshua Patton (born 1997), basketball player in the Israeli Basketball Premier League
- Justin Roiland (born 1980), co-creator of Rick and Morty
- Justin Vallesteros (born 1987), musician, singer, songwriter and creator of Craft Spells
- Dev (born 1989), singer and songwriter
