= El Capitan High School (California) =

Public secondary school in San Diego, California, United States

Coordinates: 32°52′04″N 116°54′57″W

Location
- 10410 Ashwood Street; Lakeside, California 92040; United States

Information
- Type: Comprehensive high school
- Motto: Spanish: Ahora Y Siempre ("Now and Always")
- Established: 1959
- Status: Open
- School district: Grossmont Union High School District
- NCES District ID: 0616230
- CEEB code: 051346
- NCES School ID: 061623002019
- Principal: Carrie Gaeir
- Faculty: 100
- Teaching staff: 82.69 (FTE)
- Employees: 150
- Grades: 9–12
- Enrollment: 1,810 (2024-2025)
- Classes: 7
- Average class size: 30
- Student to teacher ratio: 21.89
- Colors: Black and gold
- Nickname: Vaqueros
- Accreditation: Western Association of Schools and Colleges
- Newspaper: The El Capitan Horizon

El Capitan High School (commonly known as El Cap) is a public high school in Lakeside, California, United States, a census-designated place in San Diego, and serves students in grades nine through twelve. Opened in 1959, El Capitan is the fifth of twelve high schools to be constructed in the Grossmont Union High School District. El Capitan High School is accredited by the Western Association of Schools and Colleges.

== History ==
As of 2008, El Capitan High School is the only high school in the Grossmont Union High School District to feature an agriculture program. In September 2018, construction began on an $11 million event center that included an event space, lobby and concession areas, band room, practice room, dance studio, and drama classroom. The construction of the event center was completed in December 2019.

== Rankings ==
For the 2017–2018 school year, El Capitan High School ranked 9th out of 17 ranked high schools in the district, 13th out of 134 in the San Diego metropolitan area, 801st out of 1,612 in the state of California, and 5,997th out of 17,792 in the United States according to the U.S. News & World Report. For their 2021 rankings, Niche ranked the school 437th among 2,572 California high schools.

== Athletics ==
The school fields teams in the following sports:

Fall	Winter	Spring
High school football; Cross Country; Girls High school volleyball; Girls Golf; Girls Tennis; Boys Water polo	Girls & Boys High school basketball; Girls Water Polo; High school soccer; Scholastic wrestling; Competitive cheerleader	Boys Tennis; Boys Volleyball; Girls & Boys Swimming; Boys Golf; Boys Baseball; Softball; Track and field; Gymnastics; lacrosse

== Students ==
Academic year	Total	Race or ethnicity								
Academic year	Total	African American	AIAN	Asian	Filipino	Hispanic or Latino	Pacific Islander	White	Multiracial	Not reported
2014–2015	1,649	1.3%	1.5%	0.4%	0.5%	25.2%	0.2%	63.5%	6.2%	1.2%
2015–2016	1,591	1.7%	1.9%	0.8%	0.4%	28.7%	0.2%	60.2%	6.1%	0.0%
2016–2017	1,600	1.8%	2.0%	0.8%	0.6%	29.9%	0.3%	59.1%	5.6%	0.0%
2017–2018	1,675	1.9%	1.8%	0.9%	0.4%	32.8%	0.3%	55.5%	6.4%	0.0%
2018–2019	1,659	2.2%	2.2%	1.0%	0.8%	29.4%	0.2%	59.0%	5.2%	0.0%
2019–2020	1,649	2.8%	2.8%	1.4%	1.1%	25.0%	0.2%	61.8%	4.9%	0.0%

== Notable alumni ==
- Ashli Babbitt, protester killed in the 2021 United States Capitol attack
- Jeff Byrd, MLB pitcher for the Toronto Blue Jays
- Kevin Ginkel, MLB pitcher for the Arizona Diamondbacks
- Delanie Gourley, softball pitcher
- Matt LaChappa, minor league pitcher for the San Diego Padres
- Ryan Lindley, NFL quarterback for the Arizona Cardinals
- Nic Long, Olympic BMX cyclist
- Jaime Preciado, bass player for Pierce The Veil
- Stacie Terry-Hutson, college basketball coach and women's basketball head coach at San Diego State

== See also ==
- List of high schools in San Diego County, California
- List of high schools in California
