= Hughson Union High School =

Location
- 7419 E. Whitmore Avenue; Hughson, California 95326; United States; 37.5956°N 120.8597°W

Information
- Established: 1911
- School district: Hughson Unified School District
- CEEB code: 051215
- Principal: Loren Lighthall
- Teaching staff: 34.22 (on an FTE basis)
- Grades: 9-12
- Enrollment: 835 (2023–2024)
- Student to teacher ratio: 24.40
- Campus size: 41 acres (170,000 m^{2})
- Campus type: Suburban
- Color
- Athletics: CIF Sac-Joaquin Section
- Athletics conference: Trans Valley League
- Mascot: Husky
- Website: https://hhs.hughsonschools.org

Hughson Union High School serves students from the rural community of Hughson, California, as well as the outer towns of Hickman, California and La Grange, California.

== Athletics ==
Hughson Union High School belongs to the Trans Valley League in the Sac-Joaquin Section of the California Interscholastic Federation. The school's teams, known as the Hughson Huskies, compete in baseball, basketball, cross country, football, golf, soccer, softball, tennis, track, volleyball, and wrestling.

== Notable alumni ==
- Paul Stine (1957), victim of the Zodiac Killer
