= St. Vincent de Paul High School (Petaluma, California) =

Private, coeducational school in Petaluma, California, United States

Vincent de Paul High School

Location
- 849 Keokuk Street; Petaluma, (Sonoma County), California 94952; United States
- Coordinates: 38°14′37″N 122°39′1″W

Information
- Type: Private, Coeducational
- Motto: Enter to learn, leave to serve.
- Religious affiliation: Roman Catholic
- School district: Diocese of Santa Rosa
- CEEB code: 052455
- Principal: Tony Greco
- Grades: 9-12
- Student to teacher ratio: 6:1
- Colors: Blue, White and Red
- Athletics conference: Coastal Mountain Conference
- Mascot: Mustang
- Accreditation: Western Association of Schools and Colleges
- Publication: Amused (literary magazine)
- Newspaper: The Onlooker
- Yearbook: Vincentian
- Feeder schools: Our Lady of Loretto, Novato. St. Isabella's, Terra Linda
- Website: http://www.svhs-pet.org

St. Vincent de Paul High School is a private, Roman Catholic high school in Petaluma, California. It is located in the Roman Catholic Diocese of Santa Rosa in California.

Alumni have attended Brown University, Harvard University, Stanford University, and schools in the University of California system, among others.
