= Bakersfield Christian High School =

- School Logo

Location
- 12775 Stockdale Highway corner of Stockdale Hwy. and Allen Road; Bakersfield, California 93314; United States; 35°21′10″N 119°8′34″W

Information
- Type: Private
- Motto: "Honoring God ... Helping Students Soar!"
- Established: 1979
- President: Matt Guinn
- Faculty: 76
- Grades: 9-12
- Enrollment: 599
- Campus size: 47 acres (190,000 m^{2})
- Colors: Blue, Gold, White
- Mascot: Eagles
- Website: www.bakersfieldchristian.com

Bakersfield Christian High School (BCHS) is a private, college-preparatory, nondenominational Christian school. It is fully accredited by the Western Association of Schools and Colleges and the Association of Christian Schools International.

== History ==
In 1979, Omega High School was founded and run by a local church, teaching students from kindergarten to 12th grade. In 1986, the church and Omega High separated, leaving the school to operate independently, after which it became Community Christian High School. Ten years later, the school renamed itself Bakersfield Christian High School to reflect its status as the only nondenominational Christian high school in Bakersfield.

== Campus ==
BCHS is located on a 46-acre campus on the corner of Stockdale Highway and Allen Road, in the growing west side of Bakersfield. The facilities feature highlights such as the Media Center, Student Union, Fine Arts Center and a Sports Center which houses one of the largest high school gymnasiums in Kern County.

== Academics ==
BCHS offers two paths to a diploma: college preparatory and the scholars program.

=== College preparatory diploma ===
241 credits are required for graduation. Each class earns 5 credits each semester. Community service earns 1 credit for 40 or more hours of service.

=== Scholars program diploma ===
Full-time, on campus students, who attend for 4 years, qualify for the Scholars Program by completing a required minimum of 6 advanced courses (effective class of 2012): 2 from the sophomore year and 4 from the junior/senior years.

=== Advanced Placement ===
The school offers AP courses which cover the breadth of information, skills and assignments found in corresponding college courses. Each AP course has an exam that participating schools administer in May and represents the culmination of college-level work in a given discipline in a secondary school setting.

== Athletics ==
The Eagles participate in the South Yosemite Valley League and CIF Central Section and have varsity, JV and frosh/soph teams.

=== 2006 volleyball state champions ===
In 2006, the BCHS women's varsity volleyball team won the Division V state championship against the Castilleja High School Gators.

== Notable alumni ==
- Derek Carr - Former NFL quarterback (Oakland / Las Vegas Raiders, New Orleans Saints)
- Benjamin Yurosek - Current NFL tight end for the Minnesota Vikings
