= Polytechnic School (California) =

Prep school in Pasadena, California, US

Location
- 1030 E. California Blvd. Pasadena, Los Angeles Co., California 91106-4099; United States; 34.1337°N 118.1296°W

Information
- School type: Private, K–12 school
- Opened: 1907; 119 years ago
- Status: Active
- NCES District ID: 0629940
- NCES School ID: 00083655
- Head of school: John Bracker
- Faculty: 198
- Grades: K–12
- Gender: Coed
- Enrollment: 877 (2021-22)
- Average class size: 17
- Student to teacher ratio: 9:1
- Language: English
- Campus size: 15 acres
- Campus type: Suburban
- Colors: Orange & White
- Athletics: 25 varsity sports
- Athletics conference: CIF Southern Section; Prep League
- Nickname: Panthers
- Rival: Flintridge Preparatory School
- Accreditation: WASC/CAIS/NAIS
- Publication: OakTree Times
- Newspaper: The Paw Print
- Website: Official website
- Last updated: December 4, 2021

Polytechnic School, often referred to simply as Poly, is a college preparatory private day school located in Pasadena, California with approximately 850 students enrolled in grades Kindergarten through 12.

The school is a former member of the G20 Schools group.

== History ==
The school was founded in 1907 as the first non-profit, independent school in Southern California. It descends from the Throop Polytechnic Institute founded by Amos G. Throop, the same institution that grew into the present California Institute of Technology.

In the spring of 1907, the Institute decided to focus on the college level and closed the grammar school. Citrus tycoon and noted eugenicist Ezra S. Gosney donated $12,500, a sum matched by twelve other donors. This money allowed them to purchase the property at the present site, originally an orange grove. The school opened in October 1907 with 106 students. At the time, the school was named Polytechnic Elementary School. The school added a ninth grade in 1918 and expanded to high school in 1959. Polytechnic ended its pre-kindergarten program in 2005.

== Academics ==
Poly has a rigorous academic curriculum, which includes Advanced Placement and Honors classes as well as arts and athletic programs. In 2006, Poly was named a world leader in student participation and performance on Advanced Placement exams by the College Board. The school frequently had the highest percentage of its students receive a 3 or above on the AP Calculus AB examination when compared to all other small schools administering the test across the globe, according to the College Board.

As of 2016, the most popular college destination for Poly students was the University of Southern California. The Wall Street Journal ranked Poly 4th in the world as a feeder school for "elite colleges," including Harvard University, Princeton University, Massachusetts Institute of Technology, Williams College, Pomona College, Swarthmore College, the University of Chicago and Johns Hopkins University. In the 2016-17 class, 35% of the class were National Merit Semi-Finalists & Commended students and 80% of students were accepted to 'highly-selective' top tier universities (institutions with an admit rate of 30% or lower).

Los Angeles Magazine has also consistently recognized Poly as one of the best high schools in Los Angeles. The September 2008 issue praised Poly for its "national reputation for producing scholars, artists and athletes." Using test score data, the September 2014 issue of Los Angeles Magazine ranked Poly 2nd of 75 Los Angeles high schools. With an average score of 2150, Poly students had the highest average SAT score of any school included in the rankings. The Washington Post ranked Poly the 84th most challenging high school in the United States in 2017. In their 2022 evaluations, Niche ranked Poly as the 3rd best private high school in Los Angeles, the 9th best private high school in California, and the 36th best private high school nationally.

== Campus ==
Polytechnic School covers 15 acres and is divided by Cornell Road into two campuses, north (Lower and Middle School) and south (Upper School), and is adjacent to the Caltech campus. Most of the North Campus buildings were designed by Myron Hunt, who also designed the Rose Bowl and The Huntington, and Elmer Gray, who designed the Beverly Hills Hotel and the Pasadena Playhouse. Some of the classrooms on the lower campus were also done by Gordon Kaufmann, and Roland Coate. The Cornett Mansion (now called the Haaga House) in the south campus was designed in 1907 and serves as the administration building and houses several classrooms for the Upper School. Facilities include a Lower and Middle School Library, Upper School Library, Pool, Boys and Girls Gyms, Athletic field, Performing Arts Center, and historic as well as new classrooms.

== Athletics ==
Poly's Athletic Department currently offers 25 Varsity sports in the three seasons of play and is a member of the Prep League. Poly has been competing in the California Interscholastic Federation (CIF) since 1962. In 2016–17, 82% of the students in the Upper School participated in some type of sport.

The CIF Southern Section has recognized Poly for its commitment to sportsmanship and awarded Poly the CIF Southern Section Jim Staunton Champions of Character Award in 2012. Poly was named the ESPN Rise California/Cal-Hi Sport's Division 5 School of the Year in 2011.

CIF-SS Team Championships (38)

- Football (2) - 1999, 2002
- Baseball (2) - 2011, 2018
- Boys Basketball (5) - 1978, 1979, 1984, 1995, 2021
- Girls Basketball (2) - 1992, 2011
- Girls Cross Country (2) - 1994, 1997
- Boys Soccer (2) - 2000, 2025
- Girls Soccer (8) - 1991, 1992, 1993, 1994, 2001, 2002, 2003, 2013*
- Girls Swimming (2) - 2015, 2016
- Boys Tennis (3) - 1989, 1991, 1992
- Girls Tennis (5) - 1992, 1993, 1994, 1997, 2014
- Girls Track & Field (2) - 1999, 2001
- Girls Volleyball (2) - 1997, 1998
- Boys Water Polo (1) - 2012
- Girls Water Polo (2) - 2015, 2017
- CIF-State Southern California Regional Championship

CIF-SS Individual Championships (69)

- Boys Cross Country (2*)
- Girls Cross Country (1)
- Boys Swimming & Diving (23**)
- Girls Swimming & Diving (27**)
- Boys Track & Field (1)
- Girls Track & Field (15)
- CIF-SS & CIF-State Championships
- CIF-SS & CIF-Masters Championships

== Notable alumni ==
- Olugbenga Ajilore, economist
- Ini Archibong, designer
- Koko Archibong, former professional and Olympic basketball player
- Sean Bailey, television and film producer
- John Battelle, author, journalist, and co-founder of Wired magazine
- Alec Berg, screenwriter, actor, and film producer
- Bruce Beutler, 2011 Nobel Laureate in Medicine
- Otis Booth, billionaire investor and philanthropist
- Stephen J. Cannell, television producer and creator of 21 Jump Street, The A-Team, and Silk Stalkings
- Otis Chandler, publisher, The Los Angeles Times
- Julia Child, television chef and personality
- Anna Christy, soprano opera singer
- Steve Cohen, member of the United States House of Representatives representing Tennessee's ninth district
- Keegan de Lancie, actor
- Harriet Huntington Doerr, author
- Rebecca Eaton, television producer
- David Ebershoff author of the international bestselling novels, The 19th Wife, The Danish Girl and Pasadena, and Executive Editor at Random House
- Kevin Greutert, film director and editor of the SAW series
- Spencer Grammer, actress
- Ted Griffin, screenwriter, actor, and film producer
- Michael Grimes, managing director and Head of Global Technology Investment Banking at Morgan Stanley
- R. Stanton Hales, former president of the College of Wooster
- Howard Hawks, director
- Walter Hopps, museum director, gallerist, and groundbreaking curator of contemporary art
- James C. Ho, United States circuit judge of the United States Court of Appeals for the Fifth Circuit
- Leondra Kruger, Supreme Court of California Associate Justice and potential Supreme Court pick by President Joe Biden
- Macky Makisumi, speedcuber
- F.O. Matthiessen, Harvard professor, literary critic and author of American Renaissance: Art and Expression in the Age of Emerson and Whitman
- Randall Miller, director, screenwriter, producer, actor
- Charlie Paddock, American athlete, Olympic champion
- Drew Pinsky, physician, radio and television personality
- Rob Rasmussen, retired Toronto Blue Jays pitcher
- Arthur Emmons Raymond, Aeronautical Engineer
- Kristina Reed, film producer for DreamWorks Animation and Walt Disney Animation Studios
- Coleman Shelton, center for the Los Angeles Rams
- Alison Sweeney, actress
- Mike White, film director, screenwriter, and actor
- David Wiseman, sculptor
- Derek Yu, video game designer and artist
