= Ripon High School (California) =

Coordinates: 37°44′29″N 121°7′43″W

Location
- 301 North Acacia Ave. Ripon, California

Information
- NCES District ID: 0632880
- NCES School ID: 05112
- Principal: Keith Rangel
- Teaching staff: 51.38 (FTE)
- Enrollment: 1,048 (2023–2024)
  - Grade 9: 281
  - Grade 10: 248
  - Grade 11: 267
  - Grade 12: 252
- Student to teacher ratio: 20.40
- Colors: Red and white
- Athletics conference: CIF Sac-Joaquin Section
- Mascot: Indian
- Yearbook: The Mission
- Graduates (2016): 200
- Website: https://www.riponhigh.net
- Last updated: August 9, 2024

Ripon High School is a public high school located in Ripon, California, United States. It enrolls an average of around 900 students, from grades 9 through 12. It is the only high school in the Ripon Unified School District. The school colors are red and white. In 2006, Ripon High School became one of the first schools in California to install video cameras around the school with a stream to the local police department.

== Sports ==
Ripon High School's mascot is Estanislao, to honor those who occupied the land before modern times.

The school is part of the Trans Valley League (TVL) for division IV high schools. Sports facilities include the Abeyta-Hortin Gym, North Gym, Stouffer Field, and other sports venues. The Abeyta-Hortin Gym, North Gym, and swimming facility have all had major renovations within the past several years.

Ripon offers six boys' varsity sports (football, soccer, basketball, baseball, and golf), five girls' varsity sports (volleyball, basketball, soccer, softball, and golf), and five co-ed sports (cross country, tennis, track, wrestling, and cheerleading).

Football

Ripon High School's football team won their first section championship since 1996 in 2019 with their varsity squad, claiming league, section, and state titles that year.

The school was Southern League Champion and Sac Joaquin Section runner-up in 1976, captained by Scott MacDonald, David O'Leary and Ed Beeler.

Basketball

Ripon's girls' basketball team is currently ranked 2nd in the TVL. Ripon's boys' basketball team has done equally well and is currently ranked highly in the TVL.

Tennis

Ripon tennis has won three league titles, in 1965, 1987, and 2007.

== Other activities ==
Army JROTC

The high school has a JROTC unit, and typically around 100 are enrolled in the program each year. It was formed in 1998 as an NDCC, and earned JROTC in the 2000–2001 school year. In the 2001–2002 school year, the battalion was named an Honor Unit with Distinction. It competes throughout the year in drill competitions including the National Drill Competition in Daytona Beach Florida and performs in parades.

Leadership

Ripon High School has a Leadership/ASB program, which is the equivalent of high school student government.
