= Denair High School =

Public high school in California, United States

Coordinates: 37.5243°N 120.8044°W

Location
- 3431 Lester Rd. Denair, Stanislaus, California

Information
- Former name: Denair Grammar School
- School type: Public
- Founded: 1912
- School district: Denair Unified
- NCES District ID: 0611040
- NCES School ID: 01218
- Principal: Breanne Aguiar
- Teaching staff: 16.68 (FTE)
- Enrollment: 277 (2023–2024)
- Student to teacher ratio: 16.61
- Colors: Purple and White
- Mascot: Coyote
- Website: https://dhs.denairusd.org/

Denair High School is a public high school located in Denair, California founded in 1912.

== Statistics ==
The school has an enrollment of 276 children enrolled in grades 9 to 12. 8.3% of all students are English language learners and 57.6% of students receive free or reduced lunch.

=== Demographics ===
2016-17

African American	American Indian	Hispanic/ Latino	Pacific Islander	White	Two or more Races
1.4%	0.4%	45.7%	0.4%	49.3%	2.5%
