= Winters High School (California) =

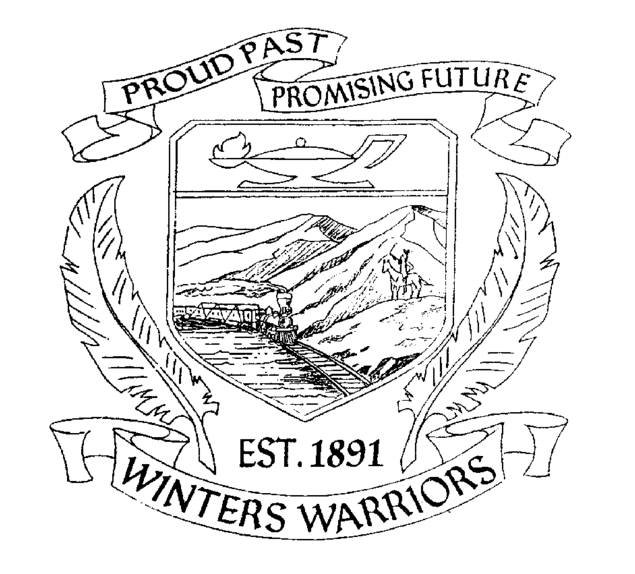

Location
- Winters, Yolo County, California; United States
- Coordinates: 38.5246°N 121.97297°W

Information
- Type: Public
- Motto: Proud Past, Promising Future
- Established: 1891
- School district: Winters Joint Unified School District
- Superintendent: Diana Jimenez
- Principal: John Barsotti
- Teaching staff: 26.98 (FTE)
- Grades: 9 to 12
- Enrollment: 437 (2023-2024)
- Student to teacher ratio: 16.20
- Colors: Red; White
- Athletics: Football, Basketball, Baseball, Soccer, Wrestling, Volleyball, Swimming, Track and Field, Softball, Cheer
- Mascot: Warrior
- Team name: Winters Warriors
- Website: whs-wintersjusd-ca.schoolloop.com

Winters High School in Winters, California had its first graduating class in 1895.

The school is located at 101 Grant Avenue in Winters, California.

The school mascot is "The Warrior."

== Courses and clubs ==
Physical Education-Daniel Ward

Student Body Government and Yearbook-Courtney Casavecchia

National FFA Organization - Kayla Roberts & Donnie Whitworth

Rotary Interact - Olivia Rodriguez

Friday Night Live - Olivia Rodriguez

American Field Service - Marcella Heredia

Friends Without Borders - Olivia Rodriguez

Band - Rebecca Ciardelli

Art - Kate Humphrey

ROP Culinary/ Food Science - Christopher Novello

Engineering - Raena Lavelle

AP Spanish/Foreign Language (Spanish) - Guadalupe Clanton & Polita Gonzales

AP Biology/AP Physics - Constance Coman & Evan Barnes

AP Literature/AP Composition and Literature - Kari Mann & Matt Biers-Ariel

AP Calculus- Mike Challender

English 9,10,11,12 - Kari Mann, and Matt Ariel Biers

Integrated Math I, II, and III, Business Math, Math Applications- Matt Baker and Mike Challender

Earth Science, Biology, Chemistry, Agricultural Biology- Evan Barnes, Danielle Bertrand, and Kayla Roberts

World History, US History, Government and Economics- Courtney Caruso, James Stark, and Jessica Williams

Psychology- James Stark

Other: Teacher Assistant, Library Intern, Cross Age Tutor, Office Assistant

== Notable alumni ==
- Rich Chiles, former Major League Baseball player (1971–78)
