= Oakdale High School (California) =

Location
- 739 West "G" Street; Oakdale, California 95361; United States; 37°45′41.02″N 120°51′17.06″W

Information
- School type: Public
- Established: 1893
- Principal: Mike Moore
- Teaching staff: 72.26 (FTE)
- Grades: 9-12
- Enrollment: 1,607 (2023–2024)
- Student to teacher ratio: 22.24
- Colors: Red and Gold
- Team name: Mustangs
- Website: oakdalehigh.com

Oakdale High School is a high school located in the Oakdale Joint Unified School District in Oakdale, California, United States. Its mascot is the Mustang. The school serves students in grades nine through twelve.

== Athletics ==
Oakdale High School offers water polo, swimming, track, wrestling, rodeo, golf, tennis, volleyball, cross country, football, baseball, softball, basketball, cheerleading, wrestling, e-sports and women's basketball.

== Notable alumni ==
- Eric Medlen – former NHRA Funny Car Driver
- Oscar Zeta Acosta – lawyer, Chicano activist, and author
- Bruce Coslet – former NFL football player and professional football coach; played for the Cincinnati Bengals
- Brett Dennen – musician
- Eddie LeBaron – NFL football player for the Washington Redskins and Dallas Cowboys; four-time Pro Bowl player; College Football Hall of Famer
- Seth Burford – NFL football player for the San Diego Chargers.
- Beef Ryan – notable political figure in Chicago.
