= Le Grand High School =

Coordinates: 37.2276°N 120.2539°W

Location
- 12961 East Le Grand Rd; Le Grand, Merced, California

Information
- School type: Public
- Founded: 1909
- School district: Le Grand Union High
- NCES District ID: 0621270
- NCES School ID: 02548
- Principal: Javier Martinez
- Teaching staff: 27.02 (FTE)
- Enrollment: 462 (2023-2024)
- Student to teacher ratio: 17.10
- Color
- Mascot: Bulldog

Le Grand High School is a public high school located in Le Grand, California.

== Statistics ==
In the 2016–17 school year, the school had a total of 463 students.

African American	Hispanic/Latino	American Indian	Asian	White	Not Reported
0.9%	86.4%	1.3%	0.6%	6%	4.8%
