= The Classical Academy High School (California) =

Public high school in California, United States

Classical Academy High School

Location
- 207 East Pennsylvania Avenue; Escondido, California; United States; 33°07′31.40″N 117°05′09.10″W

Information
- Type: Public charter school
- Motto: Honor and Harmony
- Established: 2006
- Principal: Dana Moen
- Faculty: Around 100
- Enrollment: 1,329 (2020-21)
- Colors: Red and Black
- Mascot: Caiman
- Information: 760-480-9845
- Website: www.classicalacademy.com

Classical Academy High School (CAHS) is a public charter school located in Escondido, California. First enrollment began in 2006, offering grades 9 and 10. In 2007, 11th grades positions were open. Beginning in the 2008-2009 school year, CAHS offered grades 9-12. The Principal for CAHS is Dana Moen.

CAHS is part of a group of four charter schools; Others are Coastal Academy, Classical Academy Vista, and Classical Academy Online.

== Program choices ==
CAHS offers 4 program choices for students:

1. Studio: This program allows students to take all of their courses on campus Tuesday – Friday with a credentialed teacher.
2. Three Day Workshop: This program allows students to take all of their courses on campus Tuesday - Thursday with a credentialed teacher.
3. Virtual: This program allows students to take all of their courses virtually with a credentialed teacher.
4. Five Day Independent Study: This program allows students to take their courses at home under the direction of their parent with the support and accountability of a credentialed teacher.

Students may also blend between the programs as well as take concurrent enrollment at the community college.

== Academics ==
A wide range of college prep, honors, Advanced Placement, and elective classes are available for students to choose from.

The average class size is 25-30 students.

== Athletic ==
CAHS is a member of the California Interscholastic Federation (CIF) and participates in the Coastal Conference. CAHS offers the following sports for the 2024-25 school year:

- Fall: Football, Girls Flag Football, Girls Volleyball, Boys Beach Volleyball, Boys Water Polo, Cross Country, Girls Tennis and Girls Golf
- Winter: Boys and Girls Basketball, Boys and Girls Soccer, Boys and Girls Wrestling, Girls Water Polo, Roller Hockey and Mountain Bike
- Spring: Baseball, Softball, Boys Volleyball, Girls Beach Volleyball, Boys and Girls Lacrosse, Track & Field, Swim & Dive, Boys Tennis and Boys Golf

State Championship
Division 6-AA	The Classical Academy (Escondido) def. Santa Teresa (San Jose) 7-0	2022

== Controversies ==
In 2023, after reviewing recent lawsuits against other school districts, the school revoked its policy prohibiting staff from disclosing the gender identities of transgender students without that student's permission. The school's new policy allows school staff to decide whether to notify parents. The school issued a statement saying that its new policy strengthens support for students, but local LGBTQ-supporting organizations criticized the policy change.

== See also ==
- List of high schools in San Diego County, California
