= Central Catholic High School (California) =

Location
- 200 South Carpenter Road; Modesto, California 95351; United States; 37°38′10″N 121°1′48.5″W

Information
- Other name: CCHS
- Type: Private, college-preparatory school
- Religious affiliation: Roman Catholic
- Established: 1966
- Oversight: Diocese of Stockton
- NCES School ID: 00077798
- President: James Pecchenino
- Teaching staff: 20.3 (on an FTE basis)
- Grades: 9–12
- Gender: Co-educational
- Enrollment: 377 (2017–2018)
- Student to teacher ratio: 18.6
- Colors: Navy blue and gold
- Nickname: Raiders
- Accreditation: Western Association of Schools and Colleges
- Website: www.cchsca.org

Central Catholic High School (CCHS) is a private, Roman Catholic, co-educational, college-preparatory school in Modesto, California, United States. It was established in 1966 and is part of the Diocese of Stockton.

== Controversy ==
In April 2016, two 16-year-old students were arrested for their involvement in a hate crime targeting an African American student.

== Notable alumni ==
- DaRon Bland, NFL player
- Johnny Mundt, NFL player
- Chris Pritchett, MLB player
- Byron Storer, NFL player
