= Middle College =

Middle College may refer to:

- Middle College Program
- Middle College High School (disambiguation)
- Dr. Wright L. Lassiter Jr. Early College High School, formerly "Middle College", in Dallas, Texas
- Middle College for Technology Careers, Houston, Texas
