= Middle College High School =

Middle College High School can refer to several schools in the United States:

- Grossmont Middle College High School, El Cajon, California
- Hamilton County Middle College High School at Chattanooga State, Tennessee
- Middle College for Technology Careers, Houston, Texas
- Middle College High School at DTCC, Durham, North Carolina
- Middle College High School at GTCC, at three locations in Guilford County, North Carolina
- Dr. Wright L. Lassiter Jr. Early College High School, formerly Middle College High School, (Dallas), Texas
- Middle College High School at LaGuardia Community College, Long Island City in Queens, New York City
- Middle College High School (Los Angeles), California
- Middle College High School (San Pablo), California
- Middle College High School (Santa Ana), California
- Middle College High School (Seattle, Washington)
- Middle College High School (Stockton), California
- Middle College High School (Tennessee), Memphis, Tennessee
- Middle College High School (Franklin, Tennessee), Franklin, Tennessee
- Academy of Health Sciences at Prince George's Community College
