= Patty Berg-Burnett =

American volleyball player and coach

Personal information
- Nationality: United States
- Education: Pacific 1977–80

Volleyball information
- Position: Middle blocker

Patty Berg-Burnett (née Berg) is a volleyball player and coach. She played collegiately for San Joaquin Delta College and the University of the Pacific.

== Early years ==
Berg grew up in Lodi, California. She attended Lodi High School, where she excelled in volleyball, basketball and softball.

== College ==
Berg initially attended San Joaquin Delta College for a single year, then transferred to Pacific where she graduated in 1980 with a Bachelor’s degree in physical education. While at Pacific, she played for coach Terry Liskevych. In 1980, as a middle blocker, she helped lead her volleyball team to the title match of the AIAW National Championship, where Pacific finished as runner up to USC. Berg won the Broderick Award (now the Honda Sports Award) as the nation's best female collegiate volleyball player for 1980–81. She was named an All-American by the AIAW for 1980.

Berg represented the USA at the World University games of 1981, held in Bucharest, Romania.

== Coaching career ==
Berg-Bernett taught in the Lodi Unified School District for 31 years. She served as a coach of volleyball and badminton at Tokay High School in the 1980s, and later coached at another school in the district, McNair High School.

== Awards and honors ==
- 1980 AIAW All-American
- 1981 Honda Sports Award (volleyball)
- 1990–91 University of the Pacific Athletic Hall of Fame.
- 2008–09 CIF Model Coach Award
- 2011Ý-12 Amos Alonzo Stagg Award of Honor
- 2012 Stockton Athletic Hall of Fame
