= New Technology High School =

Public school in Napa, California, U.S.

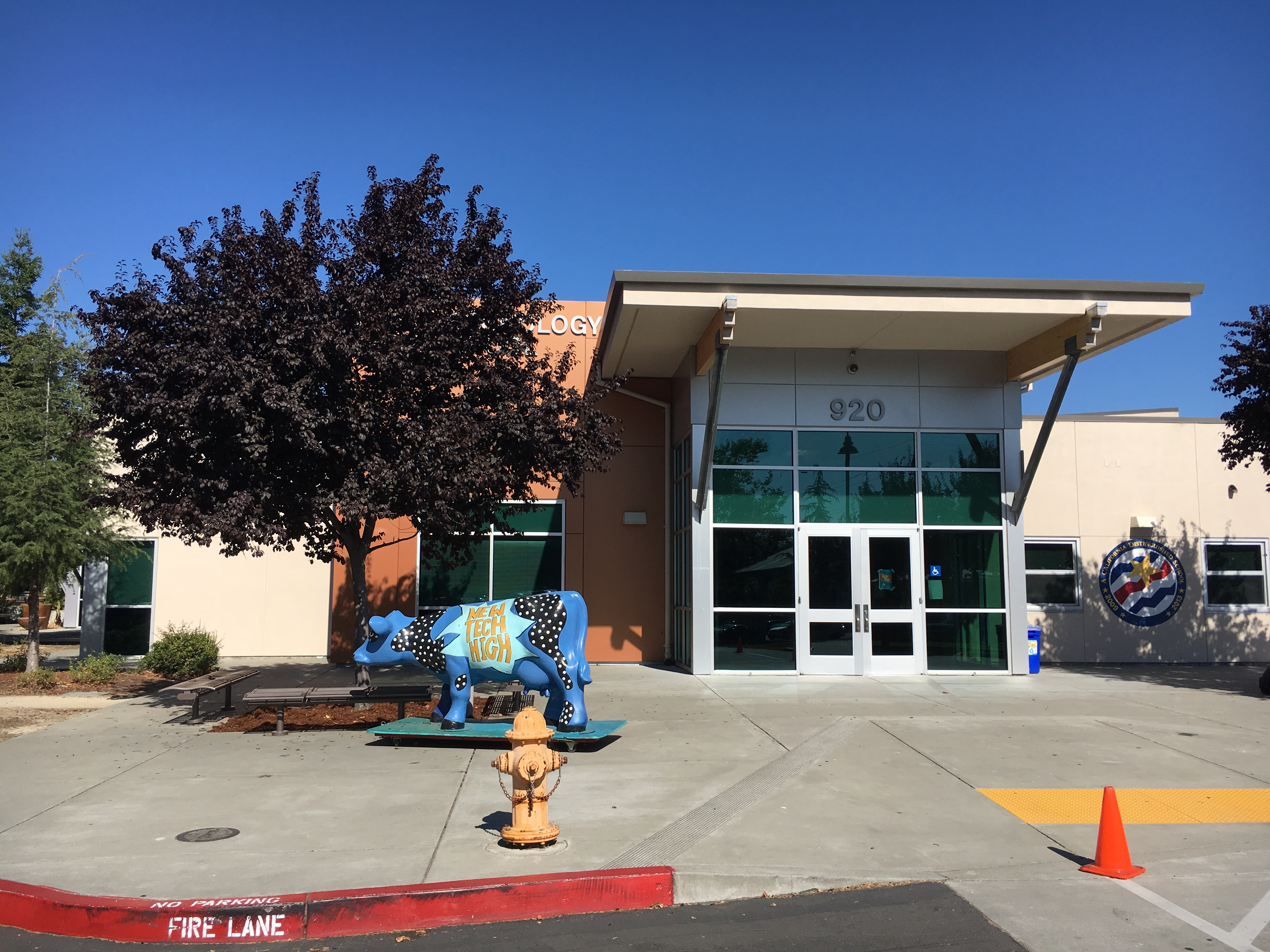

Location
- 920 Yount Street; Napa, California 94559; United States; 38°18′18″N 122°17′20″W

Information
- Type: Public
- Motto: Trust, Respect, Responsibility
- Established: 1997
- Status: Open
- School district: Napa Valley Unified School District
- Principal: Abinav Dev
- Staff: 16.94 (FTE)
- Grades: 9–12
- Enrollment: 356 (2022–2023)
- Student to teacher ratio: 21.02
- Color
- Mascot: Penguin
- Affiliation: New Tech Network
- Website: http://www.newtechhigh.org

New Technology High School is a secondary school located in Napa, California. It focuses on project-based learning, student-centered culture, college and workforce readiness, and technology integration. It is the flagship school of the New Tech Network, a school design organization with nearly 200 schools in the United States and Australia.

== History ==
In 1991, Vincent Butler began working on the concept for a high school designed to prepare students for the workforce. Butler began working with the Napa Valley Unified School District, who were looking to relieve crowding at Napa High School and Vintage High School. In 1996, New Technology High School was opened as a two-year, 11th - 12th grade only, school of 240 students, and was officially established the next year.

During the first few years of the school's operation, educators from across the United States grew interested in the model. In 2000, the New Tech Network was established to support similar schools, and quickly received grants from the Bill & Melinda Gates Foundation. By 2005, New Tech had expanded to a four-year high school, with a wait list for prospective students. Vincent Butler left the board of New Technology High School in 2006, severing the school's ties to the business community. However, New Tech continued its focus on college and career readiness.

== Design ==
New Technology High School is designed to teach students the skills to thrive in college and future careers. This is accomplished through the use of Project-based learning in all classrooms. Technology, such as computers and the Internet, is heavily utilized, including New Tech Network's Learning Management System, Echo. In addition, students are made familiar with computer programming, digital design, and animation.

Alongside the methods of teaching in the classroom, skills are taught through requirements outside of the high school. All students are required to take 12 transferable units through Napa Valley College. Several college classes are held on the New Tech campus each semester. Further graduation requirements include an internship related to the career a student wishes to pursue, 30 hours of school and community service, and the completion of a digital portfolio showcasing a student's work over four years.

== School Culture ==
New Tech fosters a student-led culture. The design of the learning method trusts students to regulate themselves and their learning. Without bells or hall passes, the campus is run somewhat like a college or workplace. Students are also trusted to run the school in some capacity, with the student-elected government allotting funds to clubs and making and modifying rules. The school culture assumes trust, respect, and responsibility, the source of the New Tech motto.

=== La Strada ===
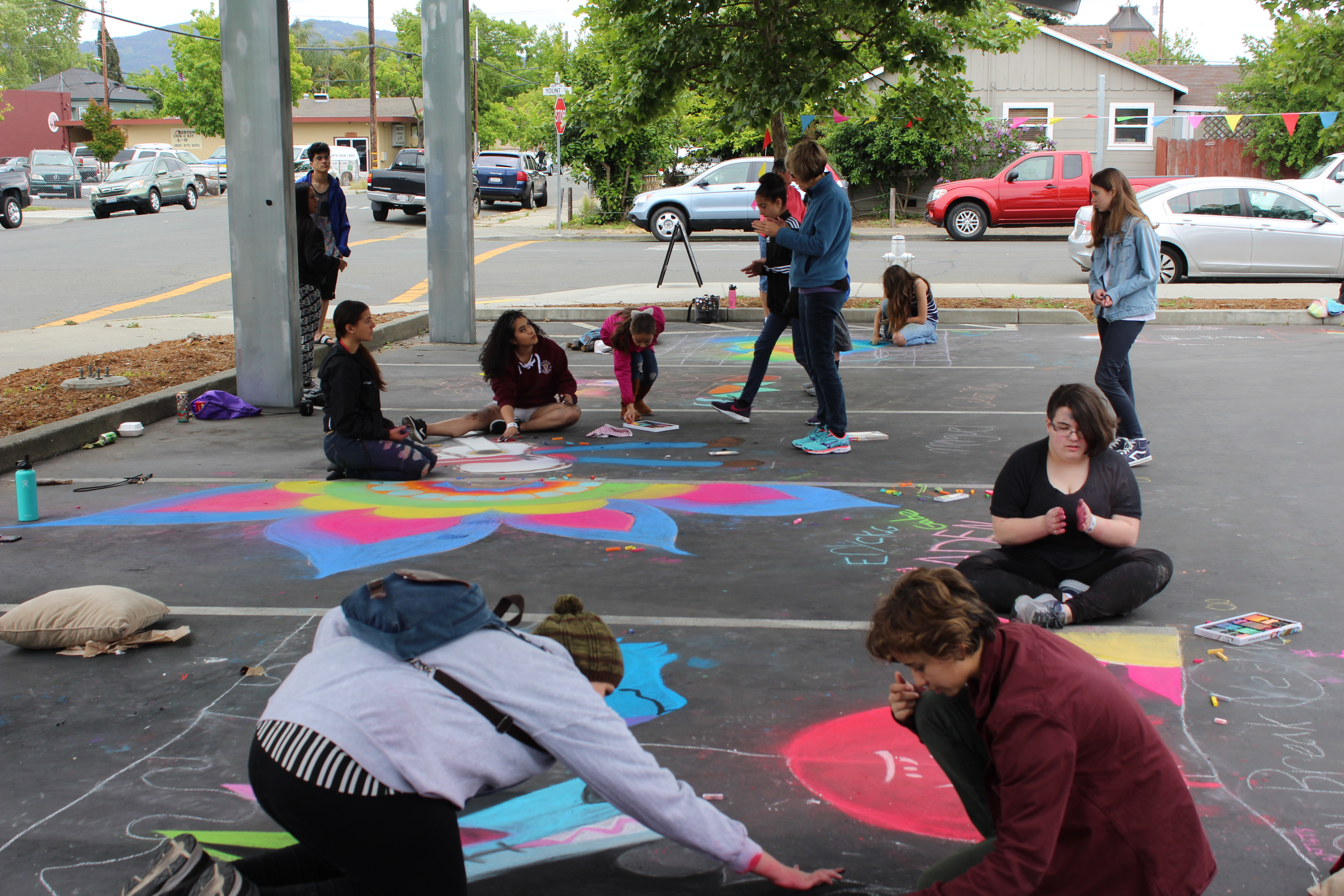
Artists at New Technology High School's La Strada, 2018

La Strada dell' Arte is an annual community festival hosted by New Technology High School. The students showcase their year's work, raise funds for clubs, and exhibit art and music. A chalk art competition is open to both students and local artists, including many New Tech graduates. La Strada began in 2006 and was originally a student-lead gallery of Project Based Learning at the Copia. Although La Strada was a success, there was a brief cancellation in 2009 due to financial issues, and the festival was relocated in 2010 to the New Tech campus.

== Center for Excellence ==
Since its inception, New Technology High School has hosted over 20,000 visitors from around the globe in its Center for Excellence. The Center for Excellence offers tours and training in the New Tech style of learning to educators and schools across the globe. Aaron Eisberg, a nationally certified project-based learning trainer, runs the program.

== See also ==
- American Canyon High School
- Napa High School
- Vintage High School
- Leonardo da Vinci High School
