= Napa High School =

Public high school in Napa, California

Location
- 2475 Jefferson Street; Napa, California 94558; United States; 38°18′40″N 122°17′50″W

Information
- Type: Public
- Established: 1897
- School district: Napa Valley Unified School District
- Superintendent: Rosanna Mucetti
- Principal: Ean Ainsworth
- Teaching staff: 76.01 (FTE)
- Grades: 9–12
- Enrollment: 1,757 (2023–24)
- Student to teacher ratio: 23.12
- Colors: Blue and Gold
- Mascot: Grizzly bear
- Nickname: Grizzlies
- Website: https://napahigh.nvusd.org/

Napa High School, established in 1897, is a four-year comprehensive high school located in Napa, California with 1860 students. It is one of three comprehensive high schools in the Napa Valley Unified School District. The other comprehensive high schools are Vintage High School and American Canyon High School. In addition, the district has a small technology high school, New Technology High School; a Catholic high school, Justin-Siena High School; and four comprehensive middle schools fed by 19 elementary schools.

== Sports ==
Napa High was part of the Monticello Empire League (MEL). However, Napa High switched leagues in the 2018–19 school year and now play in the Vine Valley Athletic League. The Vine Valley Athletic League consists of seven California high schools: Napa High School, American Canyon High School, Casa Grande High School, Justin Siena High School, Petaluma High School, Sonoma Valley High School, and Vintage High School. Napa has a rivalry game against Vintage high school, called the Big Game.

Napa High School offers several sports, which are separated into Fall, Winter, and Spring seasons with Summer practice for certain sports.

Fall Sports: Cross Country, Football, Girls Golf, Girls Tennis, Volleyball, and Water Polo

Winter Sports: Basketball, Wrestling, and Soccer

Spring Sports: Baseball, Boys Golf, Badminton, Lacrosse, Softball, Swimming, Boys Tennis, and Track and Field

== Mascot controversy ==
Following other schools and organizations in California, it was decided that the fate of the mascot, the Indian, would be voted on by the Napa Valley Unified School District Board in 2017. Protests and controversies delayed the vote until March 2018. On March 22, 2018, the school board voted to drop the Indian mascot.

During the first days of the 2018–19 school year, the students of Napa High School voted the "Grizzly" as the new mascot.

== Notable alumni ==
- Brock Bowers, tight end for the Las Vegas Raiders
- John Boyett, former National Football League player
- Warren Brusstar, former Major League Baseball player
- Bill Buckner, former Major League Baseball player
- Mary C. Dunlap, civil rights lawyer
- Michael Gage, member of the California State Assembly from 1976 to 1980
- Mike Gibson, former National Football League player
- Steve Hendrickson, former National Football League player
- Thomas McDermott Jr., Mayor of Hammond, Indiana and 2020 congressional candidate
