= MCTC =

MCTC can refer to:

- Maysville Community and Technical College in Maysville, Kentucky
- Melbourne Community Television Consortium in Victoria, Australia
- Middle College for Technology Careers in Houston, Texas
- Minneapolis Community and Technical College in Minneapolis, Minnesota
- Mountwest Community and Technical College in Huntington, West Virginia
- Message Community Telephone Company
- Mysore Road Satellite Bus Station in Bangalore
- Manual Career & Technical Center in Missouri, United States
- Military Corrective Training Centre in Colchester, Essex, England
