= New Technology High School at GHS =

New Technology High School at Garinger

Location
- 1100 Eastway Dr; Charlotte, North Carolina 28205; United States
- 35.2401°N 80.7832°W

Information
- Established: 2006
- Closed: 2013
- School district: Charlotte-Mecklenburg Schools
- Colors: Black and Grey
- Mascot: Charger
- Website: http://schools.cms.k12.nc.us/ntGHS

New Technology High School at GHS was a public high school in Charlotte, North Carolina, United States. It was one of five small schools located on the Garinger campus of schools in Charlotte-Mecklenburg Schools.

== History ==
New Technology High School at Garinger was established in 2006. Modeled after the New Technology High School in Napa, California, the school opened in 2006 with a class of 91 ninth graders and added a grade with each successive year. The school's first graduating class was the class of 2010.

New Technology High School at Garinger was the result of a joint vision by Charlotte-Mecklenburg Schools, The New Tech Network, the New Schools Project, and the Bill & Melinda Gates Foundation.

The school closed in 2013, with the five small schools becoming one large school again under the name Garinger High School.

== Campus ==
New Technology High School shared the Garinger campus with four other new small schools: Math and Science High School, International Studies High School, Business and Finance High School, and Leadership and Public Services High School.
