= Steve Hendrickson =

American football player (1966–2021)

No. 50, 56, 34, 44
- Positions: Linebacker, tight end

Personal information
- Born: August 30, 1966; Richmond, California, U.S.
- Died: January 8, 2021 (aged 54); Nampa, Idaho, U.S.
- Listed height: 6 ft 0 in (1.83 m)
- Listed weight: 250 lb (113 kg)

Career information
- High school: Napa (Napa, California)
- College: California
- NFL draft: 1989: 6th round, 167th overall pick

Career history
- San Francisco 49ers (1989); Dallas Cowboys (1989); San Francisco 49ers (1989); San Diego Chargers (1990–1993); Los Angeles Raiders (1994)*; San Diego Chargers (1994); Arizona Cardinals (1995)*; Philadelphia Eagles (1995); Houston Oilers (1995)
- * Offseason or practice squad member only

Awards and highlights
- Super Bowl champion (XXIV)

Career NFL statistics
- Interceptions: 1
- Fumble recoveries: 3
- Receptions: 5
- Receiving yards: 48
- Total touchdowns: 2
- Stats at Pro Football Reference

Steven Daniel Hendrickson (August 30, 1966 – January 8, 2021) was an American professional football player who was a linebacker in the National Football League (NFL). Hendrickson attended Napa High School where he was an outstanding varsity player during all four years at the school. His No. 30 jersey remains the only one ever retired by the school. He played college football for the California Golden Bears where he graduated with a major in history. He was named defensive player of the game at the 1988 Blue–Gray Football Classic and was drafted in the sixth round of the 1989 NFL draft by the San Francisco 49ers. He played seven NFL seasons for the San Francisco 49ers, Dallas Cowboys, San Diego Chargers, Houston Oilers and Philadelphia Eagles. Hendrickson was a member of the San Francisco 49ers when they won their fourth Super Bowl XXIV on January 28, 1990. During his professional career, he played various positions despite his relatively small stature. With the Chargers Hendrickson was used as a short-yardage, goal-line running back, despite being a defensive player. He scored on a 1-yard run against the Kansas City Chiefs in a January 1993 playoff game in San Diego, to cap off a 17–0 shutout.

== Personal life ==
Hendrickson resided in Napa, California. He has two children, Courtney and Kyle, who graduated from the University of California and Fresno State University respectively. Hendrickson suffered several concussions during his playing years. He suffered from many of the same symptoms as other former NFL players who have been diagnosed with trauma-related brain injuries resulting from concussions during their playing years. He collected disability payments from the Social Security Administration in addition to a disability pension from the NFL Player Retirement Plan. The NFL pension plan's six-person board determined his injuries were "non-football related", which made him ineligible for enhanced benefits.

Hendrickson's nephew, Dave Lewis, confirmed that Hendrickson died on January 8, 2021, at his home in Nampa, Idaho.
