= Mike Gibson (American football) =

American football player (born 1985)

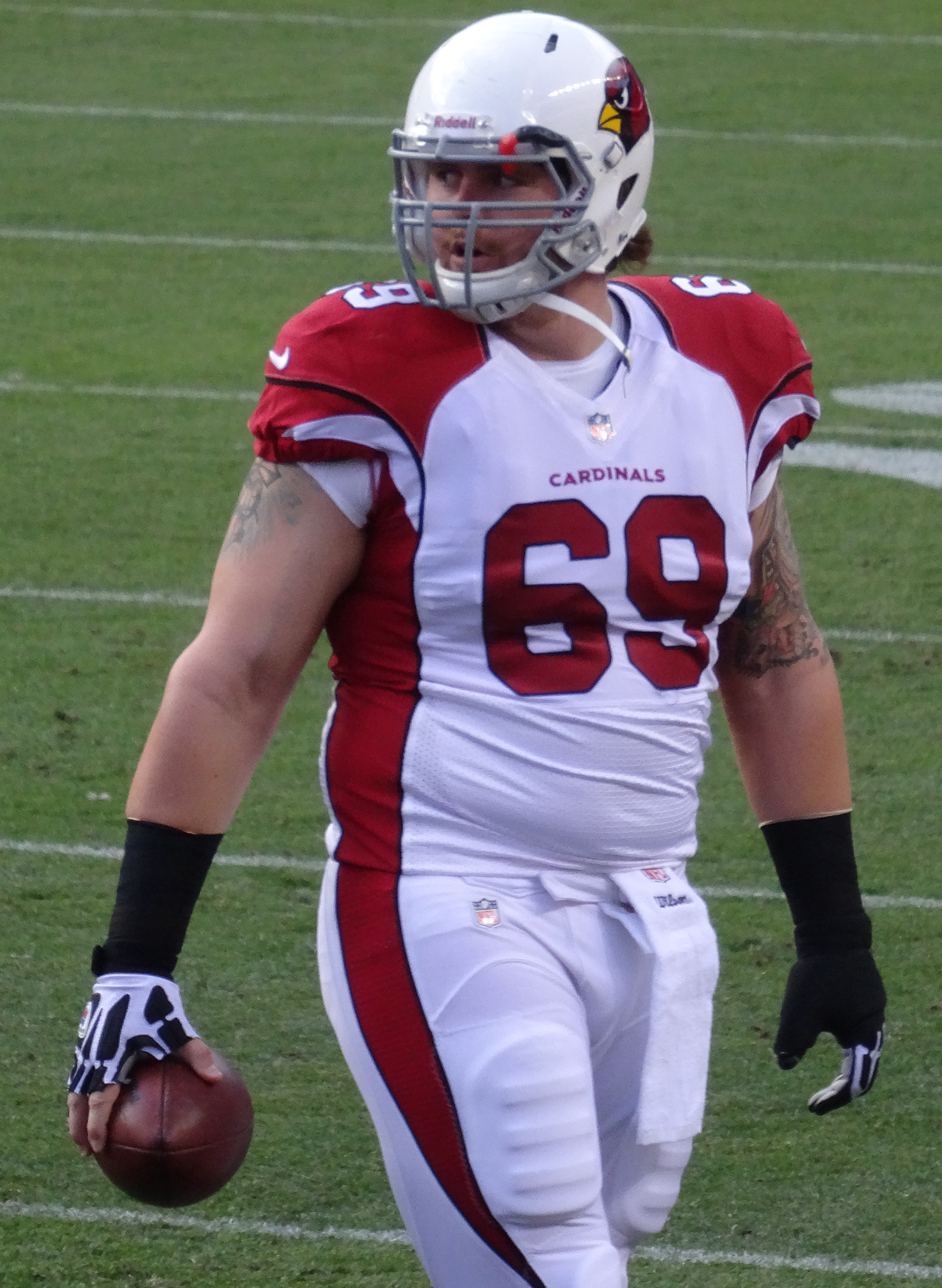
- Gibson with the Arizona Cardinals in 2013

No. 64, 69
- Position: Guard

Personal information
- Born: November 18, 1985 (age 40); Napa, California, U.S.
- Listed height: 6 ft 3 in (1.91 m)
- Listed weight: 302 lb (137 kg)

Career information
- High school: Napa
- College: California
- NFL draft: 2008: 6th round, 184th overall pick

Career history
- Philadelphia Eagles (2008–2009); Seattle Seahawks (2009–2011); Philadelphia Eagles (2012)*; Arizona Cardinals (2012–2013)
- * Offseason or practice squad member only

Awards and highlights
- Second-team All-Pac-10 (2006)

Career NFL statistics
- Games played: 36
- Games started: 8
- Stats at Pro Football Reference

Michael Thomas Gibson (born November 18, 1985) is an American former professional football player who was a guard in the National Football League (NFL). He was selected by the Philadelphia Eagles in the sixth round of the 2008 NFL draft. He played college football for the California Golden Bears.

Gibson also played for the Seattle Seahawks and Arizona Cardinals.

== Early life ==
Gibson played high school football at Napa High School where he was Second-team All-State player and the Monticello Empire League's Lineman of the Year.

== College career ==
Following high school, he attended and played for Solano Community College where he was All-Bay Valley Conference and an All-American. He transferred to University of California, Berkeley, in 2006 and All-Pacific-10 Conference Honorable Mention for Cal his senior year.

== Professional career ==
Pre-draft measurables
Height	Weight	Arm length	40-yard dash	10-yard split	20-yard split	20-yard shuttle	Three-cone drill	Vertical jump	Broad jump	Bench press
6 ft 4 in (1.93 m)	308 lb (140 kg)	32 in (0.81 m)	5.27 s	1.75 s	2.97 s	4.64 s	7.21 s	27 in (0.69 m)	9 ft 2 in (2.79 m)	31 reps
All measurables were taken at the NFL Scouting Combine.

=== Philadelphia Eagles (first stint) ===
Gibson was selected by the Philadelphia Eagles in the sixth round of the 2008 NFL draft with the 184th overall pick. During the 2008 preseason, he sustained a shoulder injury and was placed on injured reserve for the remainder of the year. He was waived on September 5, 2009. He was re-signed to their practice squad on September 6.

=== Seattle Seahawks ===
Gibson was signed off of the Eagles practice squad on October 21, 2009 by the Seattle Seahawks. He played in his first NFL game on December 20 against the Tampa Bay Buccaneers. He started for the Seahawks in their 2010 season opening game against the San Francisco 49ers on September 12. He was waived on September 28, 2010, but later re-signed to the team's practice squad. He was promoted to the active roster on October 3, 2010, made 8 starts at right guard, and played in a total of 14 regular season games during the season. He also started the NFC wild card playoff game against New Orleans and the divisional playoff game against Chicago. He was released by the team on September 3 before the start of the 2011 NFL season.

On December 7, 2011, Gibson was re-signed by the Seattle Seahawks after Russell Okung was placed on the injured reserve.

=== Philadelphia Eagles (second stint) ===
Gibson was re-signed to a two-year contract with the Eagles on March 15, 2012, after his contract with Seattle expired.

He was released by the Eagles on August 30, 2012.

=== Arizona Cardinals ===
The Arizona Cardinals signed Gibson on December 17, 2012. He played in 16 games for the Cardinals in 2013.
