= John Boyett =

American football player (born 1989)

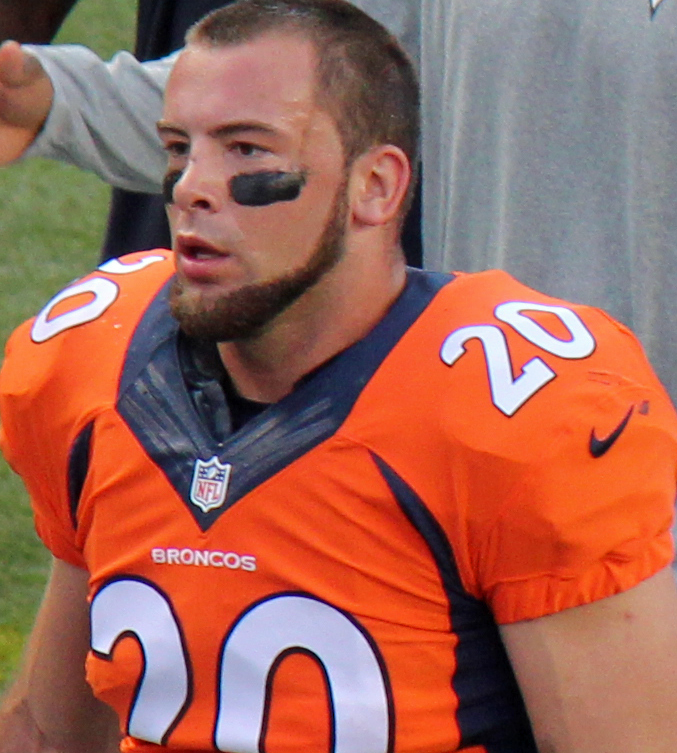
- Boyett with the Denver Broncos in 2014

No. 20, 31
- Position: Safety

Personal information
- Born: December 20, 1989 (age 36); Woodland, California, U.S.
- Listed height: 5 ft 10 in (1.78 m)
- Listed weight: 204 lb (93 kg)

Career information
- High school: Napa (CA)
- College: Oregon (2008-2012)
- NFL draft: 2013: 6th round, 192nd overall pick

Career history
- Indianapolis Colts (2013)*; Denver Broncos (2013–2014)*; Ottawa Redblacks (2015–2016)
- * Offseason or practice squad member only

Awards and highlights
- Grey Cup champion (2016); Second-team All-Pac-12 (2011)
- Stats at Pro Football Reference

John Newcomb Boyett (born December 20, 1989) is an American former professional football player who was a safety with the Ottawa Redblacks of the Canadian Football League (CFL). He was a member of the Indianapolis Colts and Denver Broncos, but did not play a game in the National Football League (NFL) due to several legal incidents. He won a Grey Cup with Ottawa.

== Early life ==
Boyett played high school football at Napa High School. He was inducted into the school's Hall of Fame in 2023.

== College career ==
Boyett played college football for the Oregon Ducks from 2008 to 2012. In 2011, he was voted Second-team All-Pac-10. In 2012, Boyett was named to watch lists for the Bednarik Award, Bronko Nagurski Trophy and Jim Thorpe Award. His Oregon career ended one game into the 2012 season due to surgeries on both patellar tendons.

== Professional career ==
=== Indianapolis Colts ===
Boyett was selected by the Indianapolis Colts in the sixth round in the 2013 NFL draft with the 192nd overall pick. He signed with the Colts on May 9, and was placed on the non-football injury list on July 23, 2013. On September 3, 2013, he was released by the Colts after being arrested the day prior for disorderly conduct, public intoxication and resisting law enforcement. Boyett tried to enter a bar and was turned away for being already intoxicated. After refusing to leave, the police were called, and he reportedly threatened officers and said, "You can’t arrest me, I’m a Colts player" after attempting to flee. Boyett issued an apology on September 4.

=== Denver Broncos ===
Boyett was signed to the Denver Broncos' practice squad on November 19, 2013. He was released by the Broncos on October 23, 2014, following an arrest for third-degree assault, theft, and harassment. After headbutting a cab driver, Boyett reportedly stole a shovel from a nearby construction site and attempted to cover himself in mulch. After being found, he demanded the officers call John Elway before repeatedly hitting his head against a patrol car window while yelling and spitting.

=== Ottawa Redblacks ===
Boyett signed with the Ottawa Redblacks of the Canadian Football League (CFL) in July 2015. In his first season in the CFL, Boyett played in only 4 games, but contributed 6 defensive tackles, 2 special teams tackles and 1 interception in limited playing time. During the off-season and into the early part of the 2016 season, Boyett was transitioned into a linebacker role, resulting in the release of veteran David Hinds. In his new position, Boyett saw increased play time appearing in 11 games for the Redblacks and amassing 28 defensive tackles with 10 special teams tackles, 2 sacks and 1 interception as the Redblacks went on to win the Grey Cup.
