= Ronald E. McNair High School (California) =

Location
- 9550 Ronald E. McNair Way; Stockton, California 95210; United States; 38.03827°N 121.29914°W

Information
- Type: Public
- Established: 2005
- Principal: Nicole Vertar
- Faculty: 210
- Teaching staff: 93.22 (FTE)
- Grades: 9–12
- Enrollment: 1,713 (2023-2024)
- Student to teacher ratio: 18.38
- Colors: Green, white, and black
- Athletics: Wrestling, baseball, cheerleading, cross country, football, softball, track and field, volleyball, men's and women's water polo, men's and women's swimming, men's and women's basketball, men's and women's golf, tennis, badminton
- Mascot: Eagle
- Rivals: Bear Creek High School
- Website: mcnair.lodiusd.net

Ronald E. McNair High School is a high school in Stockton, California, United States, which opened in August 2005. It is a newer high school in Lodi Unified School District. The school is named after Dr. Ronald E. McNair (1950–1986), a physicist and astronaut who died in the 1986 Space Shuttle Challenger explosion.

The mission of RMHS is "To ensure that all Ronald McNair students learn, to embrace diversity and a commitment to create a respectful community that develops academic and interpersonal skills".
