= Larry Allen =

American football player (1971–2024)

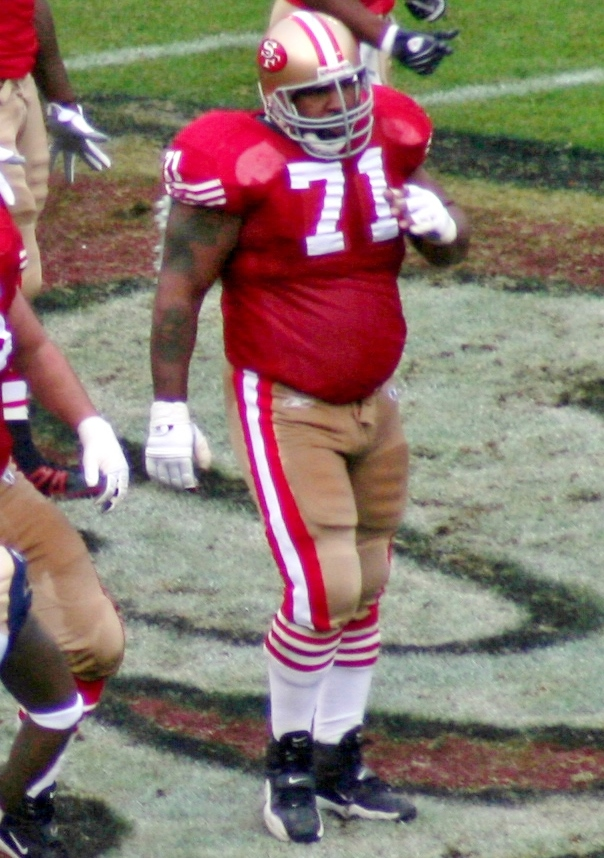
- Allen with the San Francisco 49ers in 2007

No. 73, 71
- Position: Guard

Personal information
- Born: November 27, 1971; Los Angeles, California, U.S.
- Died: June 2, 2024 (aged 52); Mexico
- Listed height: 6 ft 3 in (1.91 m)
- Listed weight: 335 lb (152 kg)

Career information
- High school: Vintage (Napa, California)
- College: Butte (1989–1990); Sonoma State (1992–1993)
- NFL draft: 1994: 2nd round, 46th overall pick

Career history
- Dallas Cowboys (1994–2005); San Francisco 49ers (2006–2007)

Awards and highlights
- Super Bowl champion (XXX); 6× First-team All-Pro (1996–2001); Second-team All-Pro (1995); 11× Pro Bowl (1995–2001, 2003–2006); PFWA All-Rookie Team (1994); NFL 1990s All-Decade Team; NFL 2000s All-Decade Team; NFL 100th Anniversary All-Time Team; Dallas Cowboys Ring of Honor

Career NFL statistics
- Games played: 203
- Games started: 197
- Fumble recoveries: 4
- Stats at Pro Football Reference
- Pro Football Hall of Fame

Larry Christopher Allen Jr. (November 27, 1971 – June 2, 2024) was an American professional football player who was a guard in the National Football League (NFL) for 14 seasons, primarily with the Dallas Cowboys. He played college football for the Butte Roadrunners and the Sonoma State Cossacks, and was selected by the Cowboys in the second round of the 1994 NFL draft. A player capable of using his speed against defenders, Allen was regarded as one of the strongest players to ever play in the NFL, and has been ranked as the best offensive lineman of all-time by Fox Sports.

Spending his first 12 seasons with the Cowboys, Allen earned ten Pro Bowl selections and six first-team All-Pro honors. He was also part of the team that won a Super Bowl title in Super Bowl XXX over the Pittsburgh Steelers. Allen played his final two seasons with the San Francisco 49ers, where he received his 11th Pro Bowl selection. He was inducted to the Pro Football Hall of Fame in 2013.

== Early life ==
Allen grew up in Compton, California, and had a troubled childhood, including contracting meningitis and almost dying at six weeks old, as well as being stabbed 12 times in the head, shoulder, and neck by a young neighbor while trying to protect his brother at the age of 10. He attended a different school in each of his four years of high school. As a freshman at Centennial High School in Compton, Allen lettered in football. For his sophomore year, he attended Tokay High School in Lodi. As a junior, Allen transferred to Edison High School in Stockton. He finished high school at Vintage High School in Napa, California, but did not graduate.

== College career ==
Allen was not academically eligible to play NCAA Division I football, so he attended Butte College in Oroville, California. In each of his two years at Butte, the team went 10–1 while winning the Golden Valley Conference, and Allen was named to the All-Conference and All-State teams both seasons. Allen was also recognized as a J.C. All-American after his sophomore year. Allen did not attend any school the following year. After a year away from school, he enrolled at Sonoma State University, a Division II school north of San Francisco. In two years with the Cossacks, Allen gave up just one sack and was a two-time All-American. The Cossacks were primarily a passing team and established 10 new school records, including most yards gained, most touchdown passes, best gain-per-completion rate and highest passing efficiency. During Allen's senior season, the team set a school mark with 334 rushing yards against the Cal State Hayward Pioneers. As a senior, he participated in the East–West Shrine Game and the Senior Bowl.

== Professional career ==
Pre-draft measurables
Height	Weight	Arm length	Hand span	40-yard dash	10-yard split	20-yard split	20-yard shuttle	Vertical jump
6 ft 2 3/4 in (1.90 m)	325 lb (147 kg)	34 in (0.86 m)	9 3/4 in (0.25 m)	5.21 s	1.90 s	3.05 s	5.11 s	25.5 in (0.65 m)
All values from NFL Combine

=== 1994 NFL draft ===
Allen's stock dropped in the 1994 NFL draft because of his small-school background and a rotator cuff injury. Allen was the tenth offensive lineman selected in the draft and the first player ever chosen from Sonoma State. He was selected in the second round (46th overall), which marked the highest offensive lineman selection by the Cowboys since Howard Richards in 1981.

=== Dallas Cowboys ===
==== 1990s ====
Allen's #73 jersey exhibited at the Pro Football Hall of Fame

In 1994, Allen started 10 regular-season games rotating between guard and tackle. During the season, he tied Burton Lawless in 1975 and Kevin Gogan in 1987, for the most starts on the offensive line as a rookie in club history at the time; Flozell Adams broke the record in 1998. Allen helped Dallas establish a then team record by allowing just 20 sacks totaling just 93 yards (fewest in the NFL) while earning all-rookie honors.

Allen was forced into a starting spot just four games into his rookie season when Mark Tuinei suffered back spasms on the road against the Washington Redskins. He received the game ball for helping keep the Redskins sackless for the game. He recorded his first NFL start at left tackle, replacing an injured Tuinei against the Arizona Cardinals. This marked the first time a rookie offensive lineman had started for Dallas since November 24, 1991, when Erik Williams started at right tackle against the Redskins. Allen returned to a back-up role for the next two weeks, but early in the morning on October 24, Williams was injured in an automobile accident and was out for the rest of the season, after which Allen was permanently moved into the starting lineup at Williams' right tackle position beginning with a game at Cincinnati on October 30. He received the game ball, along with Tuinei, for helping hold the New Orleans Saints without a sack in a Monday night win in New Orleans on December 19. In that Monday night contest, the 325-lb. Allen shocked the Saints by running down linebacker Darion Conner from behind on an interception return early in the game, as Allen was beginning from a standing start at the moment of the interception. The game's announcers (Al Michaels, Frank Gifford, and Dan Dierdorf) talked more about Allen's amazing feat than the actual interception. In his first playoffs, Allen received the game ball against the Green Bay Packers on January 8, when the Dallas offense recorded 450 total yards and Troy Aikman completed 23 of 30 passes for 337 yards. Allen sprained his left ankle during the game, but he returned to play. In the NFC Championship Game at San Francisco, he struggled playing through three quarters on his injured ankle before leaving the game.

In 1995, Allen, after just one year of experience as a starting guard, earned his first of seven consecutive trips to the Pro Bowl. He was one of a club record four Dallas offensive linemen named to the Pro Bowl, with Ray Donaldson, Nate Newton, and Mark Tuinei being the others. The team finished fifth in the league in total offense with Emmitt Smith gaining a franchise record 1,773 rushing yards, his fourth NFL rushing title in five years. Smith also scored a then NFL record 25 rushing touchdowns.

Allen made his first NFL start at right guard in the season opener at the Meadowlands against the New York Giants on September 4, helping the Dallas offense record 459 yards, including 230 rushing yards. In the regular-season finale, on the road against the Cardinals on Christmas Day, the offensive line enabled Dallas to record 474 yards of total offense for the most yardage by a Cowboys team since September 15, 1985.

On January 28, 1996, Allen earned his first start in a Super Bowl as well as his only Super Bowl ring when the Cowboys defeated the Pittsburgh Steelers 27–17 in Super Bowl XXX.

In 1996, Allen earned a second consecutive trip to the Pro Bowl, along with earning consensus All-Pro and All-NFC honors. The Dallas offensive line led the league by allowing just 19 sacks, one shy of the team record set the previous year. For the third consecutive season behind Allen, Emmitt Smith ran for over 1,200 yards while eclipsing 100 rushing yards four times, including a season-high 155 yards and three touchdowns against the Redskins on November 28.

In 1997, Allen, despite being moved between guard and tackle during the season, was selected to his third consecutive Pro Bowl at guard and earned first-team All-Pro honors. He also spent part of training camp working at left tackle and returned to his right guard position for the first 13 games of the season.

Allen started his third season at right guard and helped Dallas gain 380 total yards against the Pittsburgh Steelers, including 295 passing yards, while not allowing a sack. He left the September 15 win over the Philadelphia Eagles after suffering a strained left hamstring in the second quarter and did not return. Allen returned to the starting lineup following the bye week against the Chicago Bears on September 28, but was forced to leave in the second quarter with insufficient strength in his left leg to block effectively. He was back in the starting lineup the following week at the Giants, where he was forced to move to left tackle after the loss of Tuinei during a game at Washington on October 13. Allen remained at left tackle in third-down passing situations against the Eagles and Redskins on October 26 and November 16. He became a full-time starter at left tackle against the upstart Carolina Panthers on December 8 and remained there the final three weeks of the season.

In 1998, Allen was slated to start at left tackle. In his first full season guarding Troy Aikman's blindside, he earned consensus All-Pro and All-NFC honors. Allen became just the third player in league history to be selected to the Pro Bowl at more than one offensive line position when peers voted him to NFC Pro Bowl team at tackle. He earned recognition as part of an offensive line that allowed just 19 sacks for 110 yards in 493 pass plays for a season, the fewest in the NFL. Allen's blocking helped Emmitt Smith to record seven 100-yard rushing games and 1,332 yards on the season.

He debuted at his new position in the season opener against the Cardinals and helped Dallas gain 444 total yards (188 rushing); both totals were the team's highest since 1996. He helped lead the way as two running backs topped the 100-yard mark for just the third time in franchise history at Washington on October 4; Smith finishing with 120 yards and one touchdown while Chris Warren recorded 104 yards and two touchdowns. In November, he faced four of the NFC's top defensive ends in Hugh Douglas, Chad Bratzke, Simeon Rice, and John Randle. Allen's no-sacks-allowed streak started at Philadelphia on November 2, when he limited Douglas to one tackle and no sacks. The following week against the Giants and Bratzke, his blocking helped Emmitt Smith rush for 163 yards on 29 carries, a 5.6 average. The Dallas offensive line allowed no sacks to the Giants defense that led NFL in sacks in 1998. In Arizona, Allen limited Rice to one tackle and was part of an offensive line that allowed no sacks to the Cardinals defense as well. He led the way for Smith's 118 rushing yards and three touchdowns. The Seattle Seahawks had the AFC's top sacking defense of 1998 (11 sacks for 22 yards) and came away with just one sack (on an Aikman fumble), while the Cowboys ran for 173 yards. He also limited Randle to one tackle and no sacks in 81 offensive plays against the Minnesota Vikings on November 26. Allen helped set a franchise record for pass attempts in a game without a sack (57) and led the way as Smith rushed for three touchdowns to tie Marcus Allen's NFL record of 123 career rushing touchdowns. In the regular-season finale against Washington on December 27, Allen was part of an offensive line that saw Smith run for two more touchdowns to break the NFL's all-time rushing touchdown record.

In 1999, despite starting in his third offensive line position in as many years and missing five games due to injury, Allen was selected to his fifth consecutive Pro Bowl while earning consensus All-Pro honors at guard.

Allen earned recognition as part of an offensive line that allowed the second-fewest sacks (24) in the league, behind Indianapolis who allowed just 14, and one or fewer sacks in nine of 16 games. He helped lead the way as the Cowboys gained 541 total yards while giving up only one sack in 50 pass plays in his first career start at left guard at Washington on September 12. He helped lead the way as Emmitt Smith became just the third player in the last 29 games to rush for over 100 yards against the Atlanta Falcons on September 20, when he rushed for 109 yards. Allen's blocking helped the Cowboys offensive line allow only one sack in 40 pass plays in Philadelphia on October 10. Allen gave up no sacks to the Redskins on 32 pass plays on October 24. His blocking helped Smith to rush for 140 yards and two touchdowns in the first half as the Dallas offense recorded 205 rushing yards in Minnesota on November 8. Allen helped the Cowboys running backs record 149 yards before leaving the game in the third quarter with a sprained medial collateral ligament (MCL) in his right knee against the Packers on November 14. He missed his first career game in Arizona on November 21, snapping strings of 97 consecutive games played and 90 consecutive starts. He missed the next four games with a sprained knee. He returned to the starting lineup in New Orleans on Christmas Eve and helped the Cowboys offensive line give up no sacks on 39 pass plays while helping Smith to rush for his eighth 100-yard game of the season. In the season finale against the Giants on New Year's Day, he blocked for Smith as the latter recorded his ninth 100-yard game of the season. Allen was part of an offensive line that did not allow a sack in 33 pass plays during the game. In the NFC Wild Card Playoff Game in Minnesota on January 9, he opened holes for Smith to rush for 99 yards, including a Dallas postseason record 65-yarder.

==== 2000s ====
In 2000, Allen was selected to his sixth consecutive Pro Bowl and earned consensus All-Pro and All-NFC honors. He was part of an offensive line unit that allowed just 35 sacks in 480 pass plays on the season. Six times during the season, opponents were held to one sack-or-less.

Despite suffering a fractured right hand in practice on June 20, Allen returned to play by the end of the preseason and started all 16 games. His blocking helped limit the Cardinals to one sack while protecting Randall Cunningham as he completed 24-of-34 passes for 243 yards and three touchdowns on September 10. His blocking against Arizona on October 22 was key to the offense as it recorded 347 total yards, including 200 rushing yards. He allowed just one sack. He helped limit Warren Sapp to two tackles for the game in Tampa Bay, on December 3, while the entire Tampa Bay starting defensive line was limited to six tackles. He was also part of an offensive line that helped Smith rush for 150 yards and a touchdown against the Washington Redskins and the NFL's fourth-ranked defense on December 10. The Cowboys rushed for 242 yards against the Redskins for most by Dallas offense since recording 271 rushing yards in Philadelphia on Halloween 1993.

In 2001, Allen was named All-Pro by the Associated Press for the seventh consecutive season. He was also named a Pro Bowl starter at guard. However, he was unable to attend the game in Hawaii due to elbow surgery that was performed after the season ended. This marked his seventh consecutive Pro Bowl selection.

Allen played a key role in Dallas’ third rank in the league in rushing at 136.5 yards per game. The season rushing total of 2,184 yards was the second-best total by a Cowboys team in last 20 years (1995, 2,201). He helped limit All-Pro DT Sapp to one tackle and no sacks in the season opener against the Buccaneers, also helping the Cowboys offense rush for 99 yards on 23 carries, a 4.3 average. He led the way for Emmitt Smith to his first 100-yard rushing game of the season, 107 yards, and offense to 211 total rushing yards in the Cowboys Monday night win over the Redskins on October 15. He played a part in helping Troy Hambrick gain 127 rushing yards as well as Michael Wiley gain 85 en route to the Cowboys gaining 207 rushing yards (6.3 avg.) at Atlanta on November 11. He played a key role in Dallas' 20–14 win over the Redskins on December 2, as the Cowboys recorded their third 200-plus yard rushing game of the season as the team rushed the ball 44 times for 215 yards, a 4.9 average, including 102 yards by Smith.

It is believed 2002 was the first time an NFL franchise had five African-American starters on their offensive line, when the Cowboys lined up rookie center Andre Gurode, tackles Flozell Adams and Solomon Page, guards Allen and Kelvin Garmon. Allen had a challenging season due to injuries. He played through off-season surgery and a nagging early-season ankle sprain that limited him to five starts on the season between left guard and right tackle. Due to his off-season rotator cuff surgery on his left shoulder, and was limited in training camp and played in just the final two preseason games. He was selected as an offensive captain by his teammates, entering the regular season.

Allen sprained his left ankle in the second quarter against the Tennessee Titans on September 15. He attempted to return in the second half but lasted just two plays before returning to the sideline. He was inactive at Philadelphia on September 22, due to his ankle injury. He moved to right tackle during practice the week leading up to St. Louis Rams game on September 29, and opened the game at that position before re-aggravating his sprained left ankle. He then left the game in the first quarter. He returned to the starting lineup at right tackle against the New York Giants on October 6, but came out during first drive after aggravating left ankle. He fought the pain and was in and out of the game in the second half at left guard for Kelvin Garmon who suffered a hip injury. Following the trade of Garmon to the Chargers, Allen returned to left guard against the Panthers on October 13, but left the game in the second quarter with an ankle pain. He was then inactive next the three games to let the injury heal. He returned to practice the week against the Colts on November 17 but was inactive for a fourth straight game. He was placed on injured reserve on November 21, and underwent successful surgery on December 3, to remove bone spurs from left ankle.

In 2003, Allen returned after missing most of the 2002 season with a sprained left ankle that required off-season surgery to remove bone spurs. He returned and started all 16 regular-season games and the playoff game at Carolina on January 3. Despite missing parts of four games with injuries, he returned and was honored for play with eighth Pro Bowl selection at guard.

He began the season by straining his hamstring during practice four days before the season opener. However, he still started against the Falcons, but aggravated his hamstring in the second quarter and sat out remainder of half before coming back for the second half as offense recorded 403 total yards. He played at the New York Giants on September 15, and helped protect Quincy Carter, allowing him to throw for 321 yards in leading Dallas to a come-from-behind overtime win. He suffered a sprained left knee in the second quarter against the Cardinals on October 5, but returned in the second half to help Dallas total 365 yards of offense. Despite playing sporadically against the Washington on November 2, due to a sprained left knee suffered in the first quarter, he helped the Cowboys record 400 yards of total offense, including 208 rushing yards. Allen also helped hold DT Kris Jenkins to zero sacks, while the Dallas line allowed only one sack for zero yards in 45 pass plays against the Panthers on November 23. He also helped lead way for Troy Hambrick to run for 189 yards against the Redskins on December 14.

In 2004, Allen started all 16 games for the eighth time in 11 NFL seasons, and for the ninth time, he was an NFC Pro Bowl selection at guard.

In the season opener in Minnesota, Allen's blocking helped the Cowboys offense record 423 yards of total offense. In the home-opening win over the Cleveland Browns on September 19, the Cowboys recorded a season-high 441 total yards, and Vinny Testaverde passed for 322 yards with only one sack in 36 passes. The Cowboys also rushed for 126 yards. He helped the Cowboys record 166 rushing yards for the game against the Giants on October 10. On Thanksgiving Day, in a win over Chicago, he was part of a line that led the way for Julius Jones to rush for 150 yards. In a Monday night win at Seattle on December 6, the Cowboys offensive line's blocking opened holes for Jones to run for 198 yards, the third-best rushing game in franchise history and the second-best ever by a Cowboys rookie. In the season finale loss at the Giants, the Cowboys offensive line ended the season by opening holes for Jones to rush the ball 29 times for 149 yards a 5.1 average and a touchdown.

In 2005, Allen was selected to his 10th Pro Bowl. He played every offensive snap for the Cowboys in 2005, starting all 16 games at left guard.

He started his 11th season as a full-time starter and his seventh consecutive season opener at left guard at San Diego on September 11. He helped the Cowboys offense record 28 points and 301 yards of total offense. He started against the Eagles on October 9, and helped the Cowboys offense record a season-high 456 yards of total offense. His blocking helped protect Drew Bledsoe and allowed him to complete 26-of-37 passes for 312 yards against the Giants on October 16. Allen helped the Cowboys running backs record 164 yards averaging 4.2 yard-per-carry in Seattle on October 23. He helped lead way as Marion Barber III rushed for 127 yards and two touchdowns on 27 carries against the Cardinals on October 30. He was part of an offensive line that allowed Bledsoe time to throw for 332 yards and three touchdowns while the running backs recorded 129 yards and a touchdown against the Kansas City Chiefs on December 11, the 445 yards of total offense was the second-best of the season. His run blocking allowed Julius Jones to rush for 194 yards, the fourth-best performance in franchise history in Carolina on Christmas Eve. The Cowboys' offense recorded 22 first downs, 394 total yards, including a season-high 214 rushing, and 24 points in the come-from-behind win. During the Pro Bowl weekend in Honolulu, Hawaii, he won ESPN's "Strongest Man Award" during the Pro Bowl weekend in 2006 by bench pressing 43 reps with 225 pounds.

On March 21, 2006, Allen was released by the Dallas Cowboys, after spending his first 12 seasons with the organization from 1994 to 2005.

=== San Francisco 49ers ===
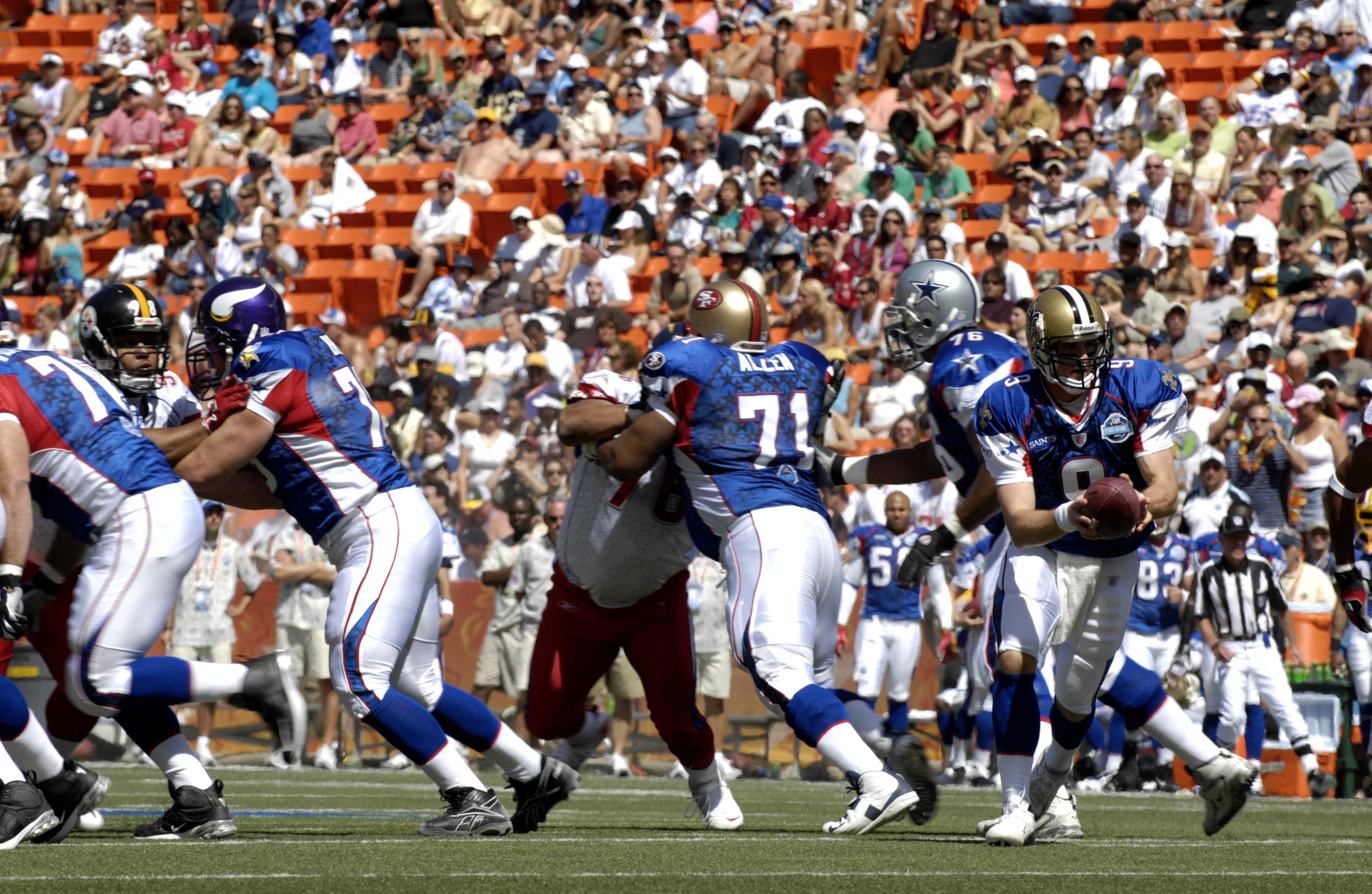
Allen (#71), blocking Jamal Williams at the 2007 Pro Bowl.

In 2006, three days after being released by the Dallas Cowboys, Allen was signed by the San Francisco 49ers as an unrestricted free agent. Along with changing teams, he also changed numbers, from the only number he had worn in his professional career, 73, to number 71. For the season, he played and started in 11 games and was inactive for five with sprained medial collateral ligament (MCL). He was voted to his 11th career Pro Bowl after blocking for RB Frank Gore's franchise record 1,695 rushing yards on the season.

Allen started at left guard, but left the game due to a sprained medial collateral ligament suffered in the first quarter in Arizona on September 10, and was replaced by Tony Wragge. He was then inactive for the next five weeks due to the sprained MCL. He returned to the starting lineup in Chicago on October 29. The entire offensive line was awarded game balls by Head Coach Mike Nolan, in part for their job blocking for the running back, who rushed for 198 yards against the Lions on November 12. He started at left guard against the Seahawks on November 19, and played with an offensive line that blocked for Gore's single-game franchise record 212 rushing yards. The 49ers accumulated 262 total rushing yards in the game, the eighth-most in franchise history. The last time they rushed for that many yards was against Detroit on December 14, 1998, when they ran for a then-franchise-record 328 yards. Gore, who was awarded a game ball by Nolan, in turn gave game balls to the entire offensive line. Allen started at left guard in Seattle on December 14. In one of the best offensive line performances of the season, QB Alex Smith was not sacked once and the 49ers ran for 228 yards, 144 of which were by Gore. Allen was named as a reserve guard for the NFC in the Pro Bowl during the game week to mark his 11th Pro Bowl selection. He started in Denver on New Year's Eve and blocked for Frank Gore to break the 49ers franchise's single-season rushing record and franchise combined yardage record (2,180). During the Pro Bowl weekend he successfully defended his ESPN's "Strongest Man Award" title at the 2007 Pro Bowl.

In 2007, Allen started all 16 games at left guard. He was also voted as an alternate to the Pro Bowl.

=== Retirement ===
On August 29, 2008, the Dallas Cowboys signed Allen to a one-day contract so he could retire as a Cowboy. The following day, the Cowboys placed him on the retired list.

=== Career summary ===
Allen was chosen as a member of the NFL's All-Decade Team for the 1990s and the 2000s. Also, he has been widely recognized as one of the NFL's all-time best offensive linemen, and one of the most powerful men to play the game. In his 14 seasons in the National Football League, he was named to the Pro Bowl 11 times, including his last as a 49er in 2006. He was also named All-Pro seven times, six times at guard (1995–1997, 1999–2001) and once at tackle (1998). With his Pro Bowl selection at tackle in 1998, he became just the third player in league history to be selected to the Pro Bowl at more than one offensive line position during his career, joining Bruce Matthews of the Houston/Tennessee Oilers/Titans (guard/center) and Chris Hinton of the Atlanta Falcons/Indianapolis Colts/Minnesota Vikings (guard/tackle). He played all but one position along the offensive line in his 11 seasons in Dallas, moving between right tackle (1994), right guard (1995–1997), left tackle (1997–1998) and left guard (1999–2003).

During the half-time show of the Cowboys-Seahawks game, November 6, 2011, Allen, Drew Pearson, and Charles Haley were inducted into the Dallas Cowboys Ring of Honor.

On February 2, 2013, Allen was voted into the Pro Football Hall of Fame. Cowboys owner Jerry Jones was his presenter at the induction ceremony.

== Personal life ==
Allen resided in Danville, California, after his retirement. His son, Larry Allen III, played guard for the Harvard Crimson football team. He was later signed by Dallas Cowboys in 2019 as an undrafted player. His nephew is Dakarai Allen, a professional basketball player who has played in the NBA G League.

Allen died on June 2, 2024, while on vacation with his family in Mexico, at the age of 52. The cause of death is currently undetermined.
