= Reagan Maui'a =

American football player (born 1984)

No. 45, 36
- Position: Fullback

Personal information
- Born: July 6, 1984 (age 42); American Samoa
- Listed height: 6 ft 0 in (1.83 m)
- Listed weight: 265 lb (120 kg)

Career information
- High school: Tokay (Lodi, California, U.S.)
- College: Hawaii
- NFL draft: 2007: 6th round, 181st overall pick

Career history
- Miami Dolphins (2007); Cincinnati Bengals (2008); Arizona Cardinals (2009)*; (2010–2012); San Jose SaberCats (2012)
- * Offseason or practice squad member only

Career NFL statistics
- Rushing yards: 5
- Rushing average: 1.3
- Stats at Pro Football Reference

Career AFL statistics
- Rushing yards: 8
- Rushing average: 2.7
- Rushing touchdowns: 1
- Stats at ArenaFan.com

Tuioti Reagan Maui'a (born July 6, 1984) is an American Samoan former professional football fullback. He was selected by the Miami Dolphins in the sixth round of the 2007 NFL draft. He played college football at Hawaii.

Maui'a also played for the Cincinnati Bengals, Arizona Cardinals, and San Jose SaberCats.

== Early life ==
Maui'a was born in American Samoa. He attended Tokay High School in Lodi, California, and was a four-year letterman in football and track and field athletics. In football, he was an All-League and an All-Area selection. In track and field athletics, he broke the school record in the shot put with a throw of 52 ft 8 in (16.05 m). Maui'a graduated from Tokay High School in 2002. At the University of Hawaii, Maui'a was originally a 351-pound defensive lineman. He was switched to fullback after Senior Adam Olis tore his ACL and played that position at 295 pounds. He subsequently dropped to 270 pounds before the NFL Draft.

== Professional career ==
=== Miami Dolphins ===
Maui'a was selected in the sixth round with the 181st overall pick by the Miami Dolphins in 2007. He took over the starting job in training camp when he beat out Cory Schlesinger for the starting job.

In 2008, Maui'a lost a preseason competition with Boomer Grigsby for the team's starting fullback job and was released on August 30 during final cuts.

=== Cincinnati Bengals ===
On September 3, 2008, Maui'a was signed by the Cincinnati Bengals after the team's starting fullback, Jeremi Johnson, was placed on injured reserve. Maui'a played in two games for the Bengals before being waived on October 11 when the team signed placekicker Dave Rayner.

Maui'a was re-signed on October 22 when Rayner was released. However, he was placed on season-ending injured reserve just two days later.

=== Arizona Cardinals ===
Maui'a was signed by the Arizona Cardinals on August 5, 2009, after fullback Justin Green was placed on injured reserve. He was waived on September 4.

Maui'a was re-signed to a future contract on January 21, 2010, after spending the 2009 season out of football.

He was released September 2, 2011, and then re-signed on November 2. He was waived again on November 29. He was re-signed again on August 11, 2012, and waived again on August 25. He re-signed with the team on September 28.

== Personal life ==
Maui'a is a distant cousin of Samson Satele, who was also drafted by the Dolphins in the 2007 NFL Draft. He lived in Stockton.

In 2010 he was awarded the matai title of Tuioti by his mother's village of Falelima, Savai'i, in Samoa.
