= Brandi Hitt =

American journalist

- Born: Brandi Michele Hitt; January 7, 1980 (age 46); Lodi, California,
- Education: California State University, Fresno (B.A.)
- Years active: 2002–2022
- Known for: Television anchor & reporter

Brandi Michele Hitt (born January 7, 1980) is a former reporter and anchor for KABC-TV in Los Angeles. She previously worked for NewsOne, the affiliate news service operated by ABC News, KMPH-TV in Fresno, and for KOVR in Sacramento, California.

She has been criticized for a 2007 story she filmed at Mexico City's Parque EcoAlberto in which she claimed without evidence that the theme park was training people to enter the United States illegally. In 2011 she received a Northern California regional Emmy Award for "best public-current-community affairs feature segment" for a segment titled "A Soldier's Portrait" which she made for KOVR.

== Life ==
She was born in Lodi, California, attended Tokay High School, and graduated from California State University, Fresno. In 2018 the university presented her with the Tucker Award, an annual award honoring media professionals from the San Joaquin Valley.
