= Davis Joint Unified School District =

School district in California, United States

Location
- 526 B Street Davis, Yolo, California, 95616; United States
- Coordinates: 38.5475°N 121.7452°W

District information
- Type: Public
- Grades: KG–12
- Superintendent: (vacant)
- Deputy superintendent(s): Matt Best
- Business administrator: Amari Watkins
- School board: 5 members
- Chair of the board: Joe DiNunzio
- Director of education: Rody Boonchouy
- Governing agency: California Department of Education
- Schools: Elementary 10, Middle 5, High 4, Other 2
- Budget: $113,711,000 (2020-2021)
- NCES District ID: 0610620

Students and staff
- Students: 8228
- Teachers: 500
- Staff: 500

Other information
- Schedule: M-F except holidays
- Website: www.djusd.net

Davis Joint Unified School District (DJUSD) is the school district for the city of Davis, California. The adjacent town of El Macero is also within the District.

== Elementary schools ==
The elementary schools in the DJUSD are:

- Birch Lane Elementary
- Monarca (previously Cesar Chavez) Elementary
- Fairfield Elementary
- Fred T. Korematsu Elementary
- Marguerite Montgomery Elementary
- North Davis Elementary
- Patwin Elementary
- Pioneer Elementary
- Valley Oak Elementary School
- Willett Elementary
- Davis School for Independent Study

== Junior Highs ==
The Junior Highs in the DJUSD are:

- Da Vinci Academy Junior High
- Emerson Junior High
- Harper Junior High
- Holmes Junior High
- Davis School for Independent Study

== High schools ==
- Da Vinci Charter Academy
- Davis Senior High School
- Martin Luther King, Jr High School
- Davis School for Independent Study

== Other ==
- Davis Adult and Community Education
- Children's Center Preschool
