= Carl Kammerer =

American football player (born 1937)

No. 66
- Positions: Defensive end, linebacker

Personal information
- Born: March 20, 1937 (age 89); Stockton, California, U.S.
- Listed height: 6 ft 3 in (1.91 m)
- Listed weight: 243 lb (110 kg)

Career information
- High school: Lodi (Lodi, California)
- College: San Francisco State (1956); Pacific (1957-1960)
- NFL draft: 1960: 2nd round, 22nd overall pick

Career history
- San Francisco 49ers (1961–1962); Washington Redskins (1963–1969); Atlanta Falcons (1970)*
- * Offseason or practice squad member only

Awards and highlights
- Second-team All-PCC (1960)

Career NFL statistics
- Fumble recoveries: 7
- Interceptions: 3
- Sacks: 43.5
- Stats at Pro Football Reference

Carlton Cordell Kammerer (born March 20, 1937) is an American former professional football player who was a defensive end and linebacker in the National Football League (NFL) for the San Francisco 49ers and the Washington Redskins. He played college football for the Pacific Tigers.

== Early life and career ==
Kammerer was born on March 20, 1937, in Stockton, California. He attended Lodi High School in Lodi, California. He played college football for one year at San Joaquin Delta College (then called Stockton College), where he was named to the Junior College All-America Team in 1956. Kammerer then played for three seasons at College of the Pacific, now University of the Pacific, in 1957, 1958 and 1960, sitting out the 1959 season due to a broken hip in a logging accident during the summer of 1959.

Kammerer was selected 22nd overall in the second round of the 1960 NFL draft before completing dual degrees in History and Physical Education at College of the Pacific in the spring of 1961. After playing two years for the San Francisco 49ers and seven seasons for the Washington Redskins, Kammerer was traded to and later released by the Atlanta Falcons, retiring in 1969.

Subsequent to his 9-year NFL career, he served in government positions, including as a senior executive at the Atomic Energy Commission and its successor agency the United States Nuclear Regulatory Commission. Kammerer is a retired charter member of the federal government's Senior Executive Service. He is currently involved in community service projects in the metropolitan Washington DC area.

Kammerer completed graduate work at San Francisco State University during the offseason and in night school while playing for the 49ers from 1961-62. He also took a sabbatical from the Nuclear Regulatory Commission in 1993-94 to attend the University of Maryland for a year to study German, History and Culture, including two months in a German language immersion program. In all, he completed 80 post-graduate credits.
