= Napa Valley Unified School District =

School district in California, United States

Address
- 2425 Jefferson Street Napa, California, 94558; United States

District information
- Type: Public
- Grades: K–12
- Established: 1965
- Superintendent: Rosanna Mucetti
- Schools: 29
- NCES District ID: 0626640

Students and staff
- Students: 16,971 (2020–2021)
- Teachers: 712.56 (FTE)
- Staff: 783.92 (FTE)
- Student–teacher ratio: 23.82:1

Other information
- Website: www.nvusd.org

The Napa Valley Unified School District (NVUSD) is a public school district located in Napa County, California. It was the first school district to purchase a plug-in hybrid diesel school bus. The school district, founded on 1965, serves the cities of Napa, American Canyon, and Yountville. During the 2018–19 school year, it served 17,849 students.

== Schools ==
NVUSD has 18 elementary schools, 5 middle schools, 5 high schools, an independent studies school, and adult education.

High schools in Napa Valley Unified School District
School	Napa	Vintage	American Canyon
Location	Napa	Napa	American Canyon
Year opened	1897	1972	2010
School colors	Blue, Yellow	Burgundy. Gold	Black, gold
School mascot	Grizzly	The Crusher	Wolves

Middle schools

- Harvest Middle School
  - Harvest Middle School is an English-Spanish immersion school. In spring 2022 Harvest Middle School is to close and River is to become the new English-Spanish school.
- River Middle School
  - Celeste Akiu served as principal of River Middle School until 2018, when Peter Hartnack replaced her. The school was supposed to move into its current facility, the former Salvador Elementary School, in 2018, but there were construction delays. It finally moved into its current location in 2020. In 2022 River Middle will take the English-Spanish immersion program from the closed Harvest Middle.
