= Tokay High School =

Public school in California, United States

Location
- 1111 W. Century Boulevard; Lodi, California; United States; 38.1092°N 121.2842°W

Information
- Type: Public
- Established: 1972
- School district: Lodi Unified School District
- Principal: Enrique Avalos
- Faculty: 210
- Teaching staff: 105.18 (FTE)
- Grades: 9-12
- Enrollment: 2,088 (2023-2024)
- Student to teacher ratio: 19.85
- Colors: Purple and gold
- Athletics: 250
- Mascot: Tiger
- Website: tokay.lodiusd.net Tokay football website

Tokay High School is one of two high schools in Lodi, California, United States, the other being Lodi High School. Tokay High School is part of the Lodi Unified School District. The school's colors are purple and gold, and its mascot is the tiger. In 2004, the school earned the Lodi Schools' Association Award.

== Class colors ==
Class Color Day is often a semi-annual event at the beginning of each semester to kick off the new term. Each of the four grade levels are designated a color in which to show their class spirit. At the conclusion of the first day of Welcome Back Week, the school assembles for a rally.

- Seniors: pink
- Juniors: black
- Sophomores: purple
- Freshmen: yellow

== Notable alumni ==
- Larry Allen, NFL Hall of Fame offensive lineman
- Chi Cheng, original bassist for the band Deftones; author of poetry anthology The Bamboo Parachute, released in 2000 as a spoken-word album
- David Cooper, MLB player, 17th overall pick of the Toronto Blue Jays
- Nate Diaz, professional MMA fighter; won The Ultimate Fighter 5; UFC lightweight competitor. The original "BMF".
- Nick Diaz, professional mixed martial artist; competed in the Ultimate Fighting Championship; former WEC Welterweight Champion and Strikeforce Welterweight Champion
- Brandi Hitt, reporter/anchor at KABC-TV in Los Angeles
- Stephen Malkmus, musician with the band Pavement
- Reagan Mauia, NFL player with the Arizona Cardinals
- Julius Thomas, NFL tight end for the Jacksonville Jaguars
- Eric Crocker, NFL cornerback for the New York Jets and AFL cornerback for San Antonio Talons, Portland Thunder & San Jose SaberCats
