= Eric Crocker =

American football player (born 1987)

No. 41, 2, 6
- Position: Cornerback

Personal information
- Born: May 20, 1987 (age 39); Stockton, California, U.S.
- Listed height: 6 ft 2 in (1.88 m)
- Listed weight: 197 lb (89 kg)

Career information
- High school: Tokay (Lodi, California)
- College: Arkansas-Monticello
- NFL draft: 2012: undrafted

Career history
- San Antonio Talons (2012–2013); New York Jets (2013)*; Portland Thunder (2014); San Jose SaberCats (2015)
- * Offseason or practice squad member only

Awards and highlights
- ArenaBowl champion (2015)

Career AFL statistics
- Tackles: 159.5
- Pass deflections: 26
- Interceptions: 16
- Forced fumbles: 4
- Stats at ArenaFan.com

Eric Crocker (born May 20, 1987) is an American former football cornerback. He was signed as an undrafted free agent by the San Antonio Talons in 2012. He played college football at the University of Arkansas at Monticello.

== Early life ==
Crocker grew up in Stockton, California, where he witnessed crime in his neighborhood at a young age but decided to turn to sports for a positive path. He attended Tokay High School in Lodi, California where he played football and also played basketball and ran track and field.

== College career ==
He attended Modesto Junior College for one year. He also was awarded Golden Gate First-team All-Conference Honors. He earned a scholarship and finished college at division II University of Arkansas-Monticello. Crocker was named to the Great American All-Conference Team as a senior

== Professional career ==
He signed with the San Antonio Talons of the Arena Football League as an undrafted free agent. He finished the 2012 AFL season with 70 tackles, 2 forced fumbles, 3 fumble recoveries, and 3 interceptions.

On March 1, 2013, he signed with the New York Jets. He was released on August 4, 2013.

On December 20, 2013, Crocker was selected by the Portland Thunder in the 2014 AFL Expansion Draft.

On September 29, 2014, Crocker was assigned to the San Jose SaberCats.

== Personal life ==
His father, who died in June 2013, was Brian Crocker. His mother is Elnora Rucker. He has one brother named Brian Crocker, Jr. and has three sisters named Jade, Diamond and Belicia Crocker. He has a son named Jayden "Juice" Crocker with ex-girlfriend Lorianne Prado. He is married to Styvie Angelo and inherited one boy David “Dee” and Styvie and Eric have a baby together named Dilynn and Eric has at least one more girl named Shayne from a previous relationship and now lives in Arkansas
