= Da Vinci Charter Academy =

High school in California, United States

Coordinates: 38.552°N 121.733°W

Da Vinci Charter Academy (DVCA) is located at 1400 E. 8th street in Davis, California. This school is a member of the New Technology Foundation, an organization that promotes the integration of technology and high school education by establishing schools modeled after the Napa's New Technology High School, a project-based small learning community with a large focus on technology. Enrollment for the 2025-26 school year is 354 students.

== Philosophy ==
Da Vinci Charter Academy's educational approach focuses on preparing students for the workplace. To simulate a professional environment, the school's curriculum relies heavily on daily computer integration, and students are not required to use hall passes. The campus utilizes an alternative disciplinary model in place of traditional detention; students who violate rules may lose privileges or be assigned campus community service tasks, such as organizing the lost and found.

== Academic success ==
Leonardo da Vinci High School has been rated as the fifth best high school on the West Coast. U.S. News & World Report gave DVHS a bronze medal in its national survey of high schools, in part based on DVHS's 98.7 percent standardized test proficiency rate.. Also, average SAT percentile for students at the school were roughly 80% in Math and Critical Reading, and 74% in Writing. The small class sizes and small overall community size, leading to increased individual attention, are usually cited as the reason for this excellent academic performance, as well as the reason for the 96% graduation rate.

== Application and selection ==
Students at Da Vinci go through an application process including an essay. Applications are evaluated to find students who will work better in a problem-solving based and group based environment than in a regular high school, and students who have something to contribute to the community and learning environment.

However, DVHS is not classified as a "magnet school" because there are no academic criteria for entering the school. The school has no technical programs, and does not focus on any academic areas, so DVHS is not classified as a "technical school" either.

Courtyard; notice the painted door

== Environment ==
Da Vinci, formerly located in a ring of portables towards the back of the Davis Senior High School campus, moved to the vacant Valley Oak elementary campus in the 2009/10 school year. Three buildings in the front of the campus have been allocated to a special education preschool, while (roughly) seven buildings of varying size were given to the High School. The campus has kept the murals made by former Valley Oak graduates. In addition, each year, the graduating senior class creates a mural in a new area of the school together, with each student in the grade adding their name to it.

== Sports ==
DVHS does not compete in any sports leagues except Ultimate Frisbee, which is growing in popularity as a sport among schools in the New Tech Foundation. The league consists of a team from Napa New Tech, the Penguins, and the Dinos (unofficially the Fighting Lasagnas) from DVHS. The DVHS frisbee team has recently. begun playing intramural games with UC Davis students. DVHS students are also permitted to participate in sports through Davis Senior High School.

Another Door

== Course offerings ==
All courses required for graduation are offered at DVHS. However, students who choose to can take classes which are not offered at Da Vinci. These are taken at Davis High School, which is about a mile away. About a third of the students bike, drive, or otherwise transport themselves to the DHS campus for these classes, leading to transportation concerns that, as of winter 2009, are unresolved.

As of spring 2007, DVHS has a partnership with Sacramento City College's extension program to offer community college courses for free to DVHS students.

== Funding and partnerships ==
The school is funded in part by a grant to the New Tech Foundation from the Gates Foundation. Bill Gates was interested in the program because he wanted a larger pool of technologically literate workers that required less training after employment. The New Tech Foundation runs schools around the country with a similar focus on problem-based learning.

== Budget and layoff challenges ==
During both 2008 and 2009, massive budget cuts to the Davis Joint Unified School District put many of the da Vinci teachers jobs in jeopardy. However, due in part to fundraising from the Davis community, no da Vinci teachers were let go from the district. In an attempt to save their teachers, the da Vinci students went before the Davis school board to protest that their teachers (many of whom have special training), were being laid off before other, less-skilled teachers. This student effort received attention from many regional media outlets such as KGO, KALW, KXJZ, and the Local News10 Television Channel.

== Major events ==
On October 4, 2018, a sophomore student gave out cookies at both Davinci and the nearby Davis Senior High School (California). Students described the cookies as having a grainy texture, similar to sand. It turned out the student baked her grandfather's ashes into the cookies and distributed the cookies to her classmates. Nobody was ill as a result of the cookies, though several students who ate some of the cookies were horrified. In the end, the girl received no legal punishment, and ended up getting expelled from the school, to go attend one of the other high schools in Davis.

== See also ==
- New Technology High School
