= Lodi Unified School District =

School district in California

Address
- 1305 East Vine Street Lodi, California, 95240; United States

District information
- Type: Public
- Grades: K–12
- NCES District ID: 0622230

Students and staff
- Students: 27,896 (2020–2021)
- Teachers: 1,312.46 (FTE)
- Staff: 1,508.67 (FTE)
- Student–teacher ratio: 21.25:1

Other information
- Website: www.lodiusd.net

Lodi Unified School District is a school district headquartered in Lodi, California. It currently has roughly 28,396 students.

The district includes the following San Joaquin County communities: Lodi, Acampo, Lockeford, Terminous, Victor, and Woodbridge, as well as portions of northern Stockton, most of Morada, and a section of Dogtown.

== Specifics ==
LUSD has 7 high schools, 10 middle schools and 38 elementary schools. Serving 350 square miles (910 km^{2}), LUSD was created in 1967 when voters approved a measure to merge 18 elementary districts and a union high school district. The district changed from a 'Concept-6' Year Round Calendar to that of a Modified Traditional Calendar in 2006 for most schools in the district with the creation of new schools.

== Demographics ==
Race/Ethnicity	Percentage
White	38%
Black	6%
Hispanic or Latino	33%
Asian	20%
American Indian/Alaskan Native	0%
Hawaiian and Other Pacific Islander	1%
Some other Race alone	0%
Two or More Races	3%

== Schools ==
=== High schools ===
- Bear Creek High School
- Liberty High School
- Lodi High School
- Middle College High School
- Ronald E. McNair High School
- Plaza Robles High School
- Tokay High School
- Valley Robotics Academy

=== Middle schools ===
- Christa McAuliffe Middle School
- Delta Sierra Middle School
- Elkhorn School
- Henderson Community Day School
- Houston School
- Lodi Middle School
- Millswood Middle School
- Morada Middle School

=== Elementary schools ===
- Ansel Adams Elementary School
- Beckman Elementary School
- Borchart Elementary School
- Clairmont Elementary School
- Clements Elementary School
- Creekside Elementary School
- Davis Elementary School
- Elkhorn Elementary School
- Ellerth Larson Elementary School
- George Lincoln Mosher Elementary School
- Heritage Primary Elementary School
- Houston School
- Joe Serna Jr. Charter School
- John Muir Elementary School
- Julia Morgan Elementary School
- Lakewood Elementary School
- Lawrence Elementary School
- Lockeford Elementary School
- Live Oak Elementary School
- Borchardt Elementary School
- Manlio Silva Elementary School
- George Lincoln Mosher Elementary
- Clyde Needham School
- Nichols Elementary School
- Oakwood Elementary School
- Parklane Elementary School
- Podesta Ranch Elementary
- Erma B. Reese Elementary School
- Sutherland Elementary
- Tokay Colony Elementary School
- Turner Elementary School
- Victor Elementary School
- Vinewood Elementary School
- Wagner Holt Elementary School
- George Washington Elementary School
- Westwood Elementary School
- Woodbridge Elementary School
