= El Macero, California =

El Macero
- Unincorporated community Census-designated place
- Location in California El Macero (the United States)
- Coordinates: 38°32′38.47″N 121°41′6.61″W
- Country: United States
- State: California
- County: Yolo

Area
  - Total: 0.587 sq mi (1.52 km^{2})
  - Land: 0.587 sq mi (1.52 km^{2})
  - Water: 0 sq mi (0 km^{2})

Population (2020)
  - Total: 1,074
- Time zone: UTC-8 (Pacific)
  - Summer (DST): UTC-7 (PDT)
- GNIS feature ID: 2804443

El Macero is an unincorporated community and census-designated place (CDP) just outside the city limits of Davis, California, United States, in Yolo County. Until 2006 it had a separate ZIP Code, 95618. In 2006, eastern and southern parts of Davis were added to the 95618 zone. Formerly, a separate post office served El Macero; this is now closed. El Macero was named for Bruce Mace, on whose land it was built. The community is in area code 530. It lies at an elevation of 36 feet (11 m). A golf course is in the community.

As of the 2020 census, El Macero had a population of 1,074.

== History ==
The ownership of the land can be traced back to General Mariano Guadelupe Vallejo. The land was bought by the Montgomery Family in 1851 who settled during the gold rush. One century later, the land was bought by Bruce Mace. Mace hired Robert Baldock, a golf course designer from Fresno. He then opened the club house a decade later by spring of 1961, along with the golf course and the first 175 lots for sale.

== Demographics ==
Historical population
Census	Pop.	Note	%±
2020	1,074		—
U.S. Decennial Census; 1850–1870 1880-1890; 1900 1910 1920; 1930 1940 1950; 1960 1970 1980; 1990 2000 2010; 2020

El Macero first appeared as a census designated place in the 2020 U.S. census.

=== 2020 census ===
As of the 2020 census, El Macero had a population of 1,074. The median age was 58.0 years. 16.2% of residents were under the age of 18 and 39.1% of residents were 65 years of age or older. For every 100 females there were 96.3 males, and for every 100 females age 18 and over there were 89.5 males age 18 and over.

100.0% of residents lived in urban areas, while 0.0% lived in rural areas.

There were 428 households in El Macero, of which 23.1% had children under the age of 18 living in them. Of all households, 74.5% were married-couple households, 5.8% were households with a male householder and no spouse or partner present, and 17.1% were households with a female householder and no spouse or partner present. About 15.6% of all households were made up of individuals and 11.9% had someone living alone who was 65 years of age or older.

There were 451 housing units, of which 5.1% were vacant. The homeowner vacancy rate was 0.0% and the rental vacancy rate was 2.8%.

El Macero CDP, California – Racial and ethnic composition Note: the US Census treats Hispanic/Latino as an ethnic category. This table excludes Latinos from the racial categories and assigns them to a separate category. Hispanics/Latinos may be of any race.
Race / Ethnicity (NH = Non-Hispanic)	Pop 2020	% 2020
White alone (NH)	769	71.60%
Black or African American alone (NH)	9	0.84%
Native American or Alaska Native alone (NH)	0	0.00%
Asian alone (NH)	155	14.43%
Pacific Islander alone (NH)	1	0.09%
Other race alone (NH)	4	0.37%
Mixed race or Multiracial (NH)	47	4.38%
Hispanic or Latino (any race)	89	8.29%
Total	1,074	100.00%

== Education ==
The CDP is served by the Davis Joint Unified School District.
