= Vintage High School =

Coordinates: 38.333493°N 122.306457°W

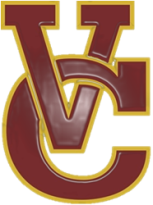

Location
- 1375 Trower Ave. Google map Napa, California; United States

Information
- Type: Public
- Established: 1972
- School district: Napa Valley Unified School District
- Principal: Jessica Hutchinson
- Teaching staff: 73.16 (FTE)
- Grades: 9 - 12
- Enrollment: 1,712 (2023–2024)
- Student to teacher ratio: 23.40
- Colors: Burgundy and gold
- Nickname: Crushers
- Website: https://vintagehigh.nvusd.org/

Vintage High School is a public, comprehensive high school with a student body of over 1800. It is one of three comprehensive high schools in the Napa Valley Unified School District. The other comprehensive high schools are Napa High School and American Canyon High School. In addition, the district has a small technology high school New Technology High School, an Independent Studies school, an alternative high school (Valley Oak), and four comprehensive middle schools fed by 21 elementary schools. Assignment of students to the high schools is determined by the elementary area in which the student resides.

In 1996, the California Department of Education recognized Vintage as a California Distinguished High School. In 1997, Vintage was selected as a California Department of Education Digital High School. Vintage has also received a California Distinguished High School award in 2009.

== Staff ==
All teachers of college preparatory subjects teach in their major fields. Some vocational education and physical education teachers teach in their minor fields as well. Administrative staff includes the Principal, three Assistant Principals, and one Teacher on Special Assignment. There are five full-time counselors. Four of them work with one grade level and one is a college and career counselor. Professional development opportunities are encouraged for all faculty and staff and support the goals outlined in the Vintage High School Single Plan for Student Achievement.

== Sports ==
Vintage High School participates in the Vine Valley Athletic League (VVAL) along with Napa, Justin-Siena, American Canyon, Sonoma Valley, Petaluma and Casa Grande. The VVAL is part of the CIF-North Coast Section of Northern California. Athletes are involved in fall, winter and spring sports that include:

Fall—Cross Country, Football, Girls' Golf, Girls' Tennis, Volleyball, and Water Polo

Winter—Boys' Basketball, Girls' Basketball, Boys' Soccer, Girls' Soccer, and Wrestling

Spring—Badminton (co-ed), Baseball, Boys' Golf, Softball, Swimming/Diving, Boys' Tennis, and Track & Field.

Their football and soccer teams play at Memorial Stadium, a facility the school shares with Napa High School.

== Notable alumni ==
- Kathleen Rubins, NASA Astronaut and microbiologist
- Jeff Bridewell, former professional football player
- Larry Allen, former professional football player, member of the Pro Football Hall of Fame, did not graduate
- Sean LaChapelle, former football player
