= Middle College High School (Stockton) =

Coordinates: 37°59′42″N 121°19′3″W

Location
- 5151 Pacific Avenue, Holt 208; Stockton, California; United States

Information
- Type: Public
- Motto: Be Someone. Go Somewhere. Seek Excellence.
- Established: August 2000
- School district: Lodi Unified School District
- Principal: Jara
- Teaching staff: 10.66 (FTE)
- Grades: 9-12
- Enrollment: 343 (2024-2025)
- Student to teacher ratio: 32.18
- Colors: Silver, White, Red, and Black
- Mascot: Dragon
- Website: middlecollege.lodiusd.net

Middle College High School (also known as Middle College or by its initials MCHS) is located in Stockton California, on the San Joaquin Delta College campus and is part of the Lodi Unified School District (LUSD). Middle College was founded in the fall of 2000. Its target enrollment is 360 students in grades nine through twelve, each grade having about 90 students.

In 2007 and 2011 Middle College was named a California Distinguished School and in 2008 was named a National Blue Ribbon School. It was considered to be one of the more prestigious schools in the area, with an Academic Performance Index (API) Score of 915 in 2013. The school is accredited by the Western Association of School and Colleges Accrediting Commission for Schools.

Middle College is an AVID school, where students take an AVID class for all four years of enrollment.

Middle College has a Dual Enrollment program, which allows students to enroll in college courses while completing their traditional high school credits.

The school's mission is, "to provide a supportive, academically challenging environment where students are able to successfully complete 30-60 transferable college units in order to directly apply to a 4-year college." The majority of Middle College students graduate with one or more associate degrees in arts (AA) or sciences (AS) in addition to their high school diploma. Given this, it is typical for students to complete their general education and move on to four-year universities with junior standings.

Due to the school's small school setting, the school does not offer AP courses, Honors classes, or sports. Enrollment at Middle College mostly consists of minorities.

Middle College participates in well-known organizations such as AVID, American Red Cross, National Honor Society, United States Academic Decathlon, Mathematics, Engineering, Science Achievement (MESA), Key Club International, and Science Olympiad.

== See also ==
- Middle College Program
- Lodi Unified School District
