= Bear Creek High School (California) =

Location
- 10555 Thornton Road; Stockton, San Joaquin County, California; United States; 38.05108°N 121.35218°W

Information
- Type: Public high school
- Established: 1991
- School district: Lodi Unified School District
- Principal: Julie Hummel
- Teaching staff: 100.50 (FTE)
- Enrollment: 1,880 (2023-2024)
- Student to teacher ratio: 18.70
- Colors: Blue and Silver
- Athletics: Baseball, Cheerleading, Cross Country, Football, Softball, Track and Field, Volleyball, Women's/Men's WaterPolo, Men/Women's Swimming, Men/Women's Basketball, Men/Women's Golf, Tennis, Badminton
- Mascot: Bruin
- Newspaper: The Bruin Voice
- Yearbook: Cornerstone Yearbook
- Emblem: Bear Creek Paw
- Website: bearcreek.lodiusd.net

Bear Creek High School is a high school located in north Stockton, California. It is part of Lodi Unified School District (Lodi USD). Before Ronald E. McNair High School opened in 2005, Bear Creek was the newest high school in Lodi USD. Current enrollment is approximately 2,300 students. Opportunities for BCHS students includes levels of most core classes, a large variety of electives, AP classes, and a host of extracurricular activities. The Bear Creek High four-year graduation rate exceeds 84%. BCHS continues to prepare Bruin learners for the 21st century by linking the traditions of the past with the challenges of the future.

The mission of BCHS is that students graduate empowered with the academic and personal skills they need to take responsibility for their college and career ambitions and to mature into productive members of the community.

== History ==
Bear Creek High School opened as the third Lodi Unified School District high school in the fall of 1991 to serve the many Lodi USD high school students who reside in north Stockton. Beginning with just freshmen and sophomore classes, Bear Creek is now a large comprehensive high school with an estimated 2024–2025 student population of near 1,950. The student population from its primarily residential attendance area reflects the diversity of the community ethnically, culturally, and economically.

The school's philosophy emphasizes the ability of all students to learn in primarily a heterogeneous environment. Multiple support services and programs have been developed over the years. There are over 100 certificated staff members and 75 support staff personnel.

== Controversies ==
The Record reported in January 2005 that some black students had been arrested for assaulting white students, in incidents near the school gym and in the boys' restroom- which produced some discontent among parents, although there was no evidence the attacks were racially motivated. The report also described gang activity, gambling, and drugs as common on campus.

In the 2010–2011 school year, then-principal Daryl Camp caused controversy by requesting review and restriction of school newspaper The Bruin Voice before it was published monthly, a violation of California Education Code 48907. Despite the Voice having no previous reprimands from administration and winning statewide awards, Camp stated that he wanted to make sure the school is free of libel. Camp was replaced by Jesse M. Bethel High School principal Shirley McNichols after the school year.

Only around 10% of students attended classes on September 19, 2014, after principal Bill Atterberry emailed parents alerting of a possible terrorist threat. Atterberry wrote in his September 18 email: "This afternoon, we received a call from an upset parent who said that he was 'coming down tomorrow and it’s going to be like a Columbine situation.'" The parent, Orlando Johnson, clarified that he wanted to know why his 14-year-old son had missed 30 days of school and told The Record that his exact question to school staff was: "Would you want the school to be like a Columbine, I get a phone call that my kid is dead?"

In November 2017, a widely circulated cell phone video showed a Bear Creek biology teacher asking a student to leave class for being disruptive, attempting to take the student by the arm, and finally dragging the student by his backpack out of the classroom. The student's father began to seek legal recourse.

In May 2019, a video showed a brawl between students and police; amidst the brawl, a trash can was seen thrown at the police. The police officer was trying to arrest a student.

== Athletics ==
Bear Creek High School was well known for their National Champion Cheerleading squads from 1997 to 2001. They were coached by John Hebert, Lisa Deeter (Science teacher) and Gigi Mandujan.

Bear Creek won the San Joaquin Athletic Association track and field league championship over Stagg High School in 1997. They had a 7'1" high jumper Darryl Feilbach and a 16'7" pole vaulter David Gritz. Feilbach tied the 1st place jump at the California State meet and Gritz took 1st alone, just missing on the CIF state meet record of 17'1". There were also some stand outs in the 98 and 99 season, but not to the extent of Feilbach and Gritz. Feilbach and Gritz both went on to compete in the national championships in 1997.

The swimming and water polo teams practiced each day at McNair High School, however in May 2007, groundbreaking began for several new additions to the school, including a new pool. Additionally a second gym and a theater arts center, which were opened for partial use in fall 2008.

Other sports offered at Bear Creek include baseball, water polo, football, badminton, cross country, track and field, basketball, tennis, golf, girls volleyball, soccer, wrestling, and girls softball.

== Notable alumni ==
- Neck Face, (class of 2002), graffiti artist
- Shani Hilton (class of 2002), journalist and current head of US news at BuzzFeed
- Chase Hudson, social media personality
- Ryan Leslie (class of 1994), R&B singer
- Jasmine Sandlas (class of 2006), Punjabi singer
