= Lodi High School (California) =

Location
- 3 South Pacific Avenue; Lodi, California 95242; United States; 38.13362°N 121.29124°W

Information
- Type: Public
- Motto: "Knowledge is Power"
- Established: September 8, 1896
- School district: Lodi Unified School District
- Principal: Jesus Marron
- Teaching staff: 111.26 (FTE)
- Grades: 9–12
- Enrollment: 1,990 (2023–2024)
- Student to teacher ratio: 17.89
- Colors: Red & White
- Athletics: football, basketball, soccer, water polo, swimming and diving, track and field, cheer, drill, cross country, tennis, golf, volleyball, wrestling, badminton, baseball, softball, band
- Team name: Flames
- Website: lodihigh.lodiusd.net

Lodi High School, serving grades 9–12, is one of four comprehensive high schools in Lodi Unified School District. The physical plant encompasses three gymnasiums, 59 permanent classrooms, one cafeteria, 30 portables, four computer labs, one theater complex, a college and career center, one administration center, one counseling center, and one metal, one wood and one automotive technology shop. While the present site was built in 1956, Lodi High School began classes on September 8, 1896, and celebrated its centennial birthday during the 1996–97 school year. At the present time, Lodi High School is on a modified traditional calendar.

== History ==
The school first opened on September 8, 1896.

== Notable alumni ==
- Patty Berg-Burnett - volleyball player and coach
- Greg Bishop - 6-year NFL offensive lineman
- Alyson Huber - Assemblywoman, Judge
- Patrick Ianni - soccer defender for Seattle Sounders FC
- Tayt Ianni - former soccer defender for the San Jose Earthquakes
- Carl Kammerer - NFL player in 1960s
- Bridget Marquardt - Reality television participant and model
- Robert Mondavi - Mondavi Wines
- Bill Munson - 16-year NFL quarterback
- A Skylit Drive - A 6-piece Post-hardcore band.
- Justin Medeiros - 2-time CrossFit Games Champion
