= American Canyon, California =

City in California, United States

- City
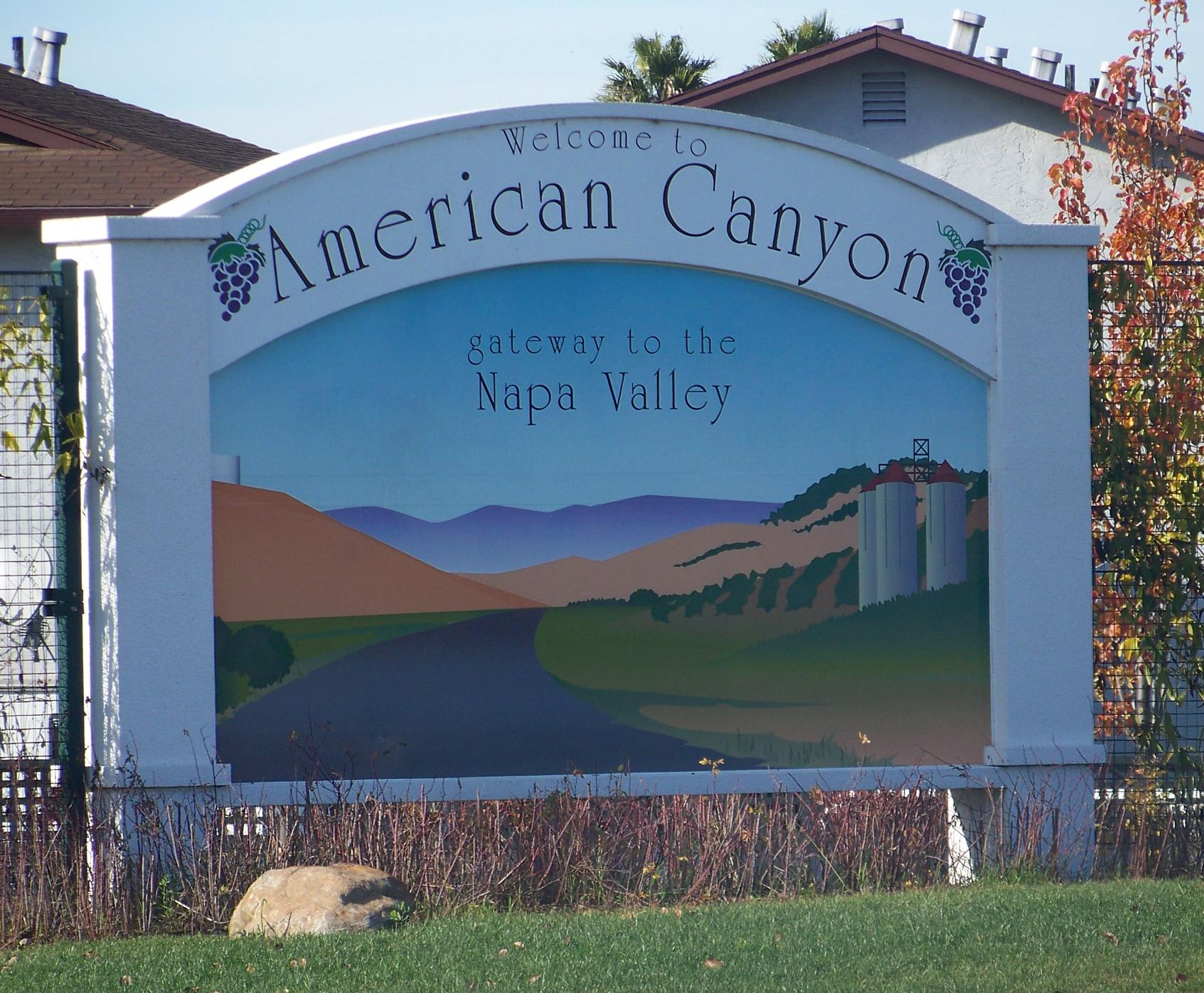
- "Welcome to American Canyon; The Gateway to the Napa Valley" sign

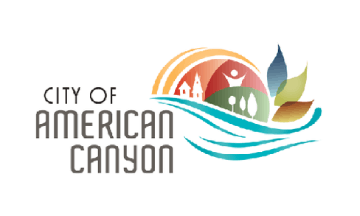
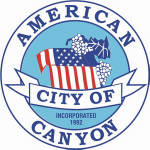
- Flag Seal
- Nicknames: Gateway to the Napa Valley; AmCan
- Interactive map of American Canyon, California
- Location in California American Canyon, California (the United States) American Canyon, California (North America)
- Coordinates: 38°10′5″N 122°15′9″W
- Country: United States
- State: California
- County: Napa
- Incorporated: January 1, 1992

Government
  - Mayor: Pierre Washington

Area
  - Total: 6.13 sq mi (15.87 km^{2})
  - Land: 6.08 sq mi (15.76 km^{2})
  - Water: 0.039 sq mi (0.10 km^{2}) 0.17%
- Elevation: 46 ft (14 m)

Population (2020)
  - Total: 21,837
  - Density: 3,588.0/sq mi (1,385.32/km^{2})
- Time zone: UTC-8 (Pacific (PST))
  - Summer (DST): UTC-7 (PDT)
- ZIP Code: 94503
- Area code: 707
- FIPS code: 06-01640
- GNIS feature ID: 1668253
- Website: www.americancanyon.gov

American Canyon (previously known as Napa Junction) is a city in southern Napa County, California, United States, 35 miles (55 km) northeast of San Francisco, part of the San Francisco Bay Area. The 2020 census reported the city's population as 21,837. Its ZIP Code is 94503, and its area code is 707. It is in the Pacific Time time zone and observes Daylight-Saving Time. The city was incorporated in 1992.

== Geography ==
American Canyon is bounded geographically by the Napa River to the west, the foothills of the Sulfur Springs Mountains to the east, Vallejo and Solano County to the south and vineyards and the Napa County Airport (IATA airport code APC) to the north. American Canyon Creek, a tributary of the Napa River, runs through the city.

According to the United States Census Bureau, the city has a total area of 4.8 square miles (12 km^{2}), of which 99.83% is land and 0.17% is water.

The unincorporated community of Napa Junction is adjacent to the city.

On August 24, 2014, at 3:20 a.m., the area was struck by a magnitude 6.0 earthquake centered 3.7 miles (6.0 km) northwest of the city.

=== Climate ===
This region experiences warm (but not hot) and dry summers, with no average monthly temperatures above 71.6 °F (22 °C). According to the Köppen Climate Classification system, American Canyon has a warm-summer Mediterranean climate, abbreviated "Csb" on climate maps.

== Demographics ==
American Canyon is the second most populous city in Napa County, after the City of Napa.

=== 2020 census ===
As of the 2020 census, American Canyon had a population of 21,837. The population density was 3,588.1 inhabitants per square mile (1,385.4/km^{2}). The census reported that 99.7% of residents lived in households and 0.3% lived in non-institutionalized group quarters.

The median age was 38.3 years. 24.2% of residents were under the age of 18, 10.3% were between 18 and 24, 24.6% were between 25 and 44, 27.6% were between 45 and 64, and 13.3% were 65 years of age or older. For every 100 females there were 95.0 males, and for every 100 females age 18 and over there were 92.5 males age 18 and over.

There were 6,192 households, of which 46.4% had children under the age of 18 living in them. Of all households, 60.7% were married-couple households, 5.3% were cohabiting couple households, 21.7% had a female householder with no partner present, and 12.3% had a male householder with no partner present. About 12.8% of all households were made up of individuals and 6.2% had someone living alone who was 65 years of age or older. The average household size was 3.51. There were 5,091 families (82.2% of all households).

There were 6,334 housing units at an average density of 1,040.7 units per square mile (401.8 units/km^{2}), of which 97.8% were occupied; 74.9% were owner-occupied and 25.1% were occupied by renters. About 2.2% of housing units were vacant, with a homeowner vacancy rate of 0.3% and a rental vacancy rate of 2.9%.

99.8% of residents lived in urban areas, while 0.2% lived in rural areas.

Racial composition as of the 2020 census
Race	Number	Percent
White	5,313	24.3%
Black or African American	1,480	6.8%
American Indian and Alaska Native	227	1.0%
Asian	7,774	35.6%
Native Hawaiian and Other Pacific Islander	157	0.7%
Some other race	3,734	17.1%
Two or more races	3,152	14.4%
Hispanic or Latino (of any race)	6,705	30.7%

Historical population
Census	Pop.	Note	%±
1980	5,712		—
1990	7,706		34.9%
2000	9,774		26.8%
2010	19,454		99.0%
2020	21,837		12.2%
U.S. Decennial Census

=== 2023 American Community Survey ===
In 2023, the US Census Bureau estimated that 31.1% of the population were foreign-born. Of all people aged 5 or older, 56.7% spoke only English at home, 21.8% spoke Spanish, 3.1% spoke other Indo-European languages, 18.0% spoke Asian or Pacific Islander languages, and 0.4% spoke other languages. Of those aged 25 or older, 83.7% were high school graduates and 32.7% had a bachelor's degree.

The median household income was $123,935, and the per capita income was $43,301. About 7.4% of families and 7.5% of the population were below the poverty line.

== Economy ==
Major employers in American Canyon include Owens Corning Masonry Products and Mezzetta.

== Government ==
The mayor of American Canyon is popularly elected to a four-year term. The current mayor is Pierre Washington. City Council members are elected to four-year terms, and select one of their members to serve as vice mayor. The other current City Council members are Mark Joseph, Melissa Lamattina, David Oro, and Brando Cruz. Pierre Washington is serving his first term as mayor, and Mark Joseph is the vice mayor.

In the California State Legislature, American Canyon is in the 3rd senatorial district, represented by Democrat Christopher Cabaldon, and in the 4th Assembly district, represented by Democrat Cecilia Aguiar-Curry.

In the United States House of Representatives, American Canyon is in California's 4th congressional district, represented by Democrat Mike Thompson.

American Canyon vote by party in presidential elections
Year	Democratic	Republican
2016	71.7% 5,456	22.8% 1,738
2012	71.1% 4,778	26.7% 1,791
2008	68.8% 4,325	29.1% 1,830
2004	65.0% 2,190	34.0% 1,145
2000	63.1% 2,144	32.8% 1,115
1996	57.9% 1,524	27.9% 734
1992	49.7% 1,645	24.3% 805

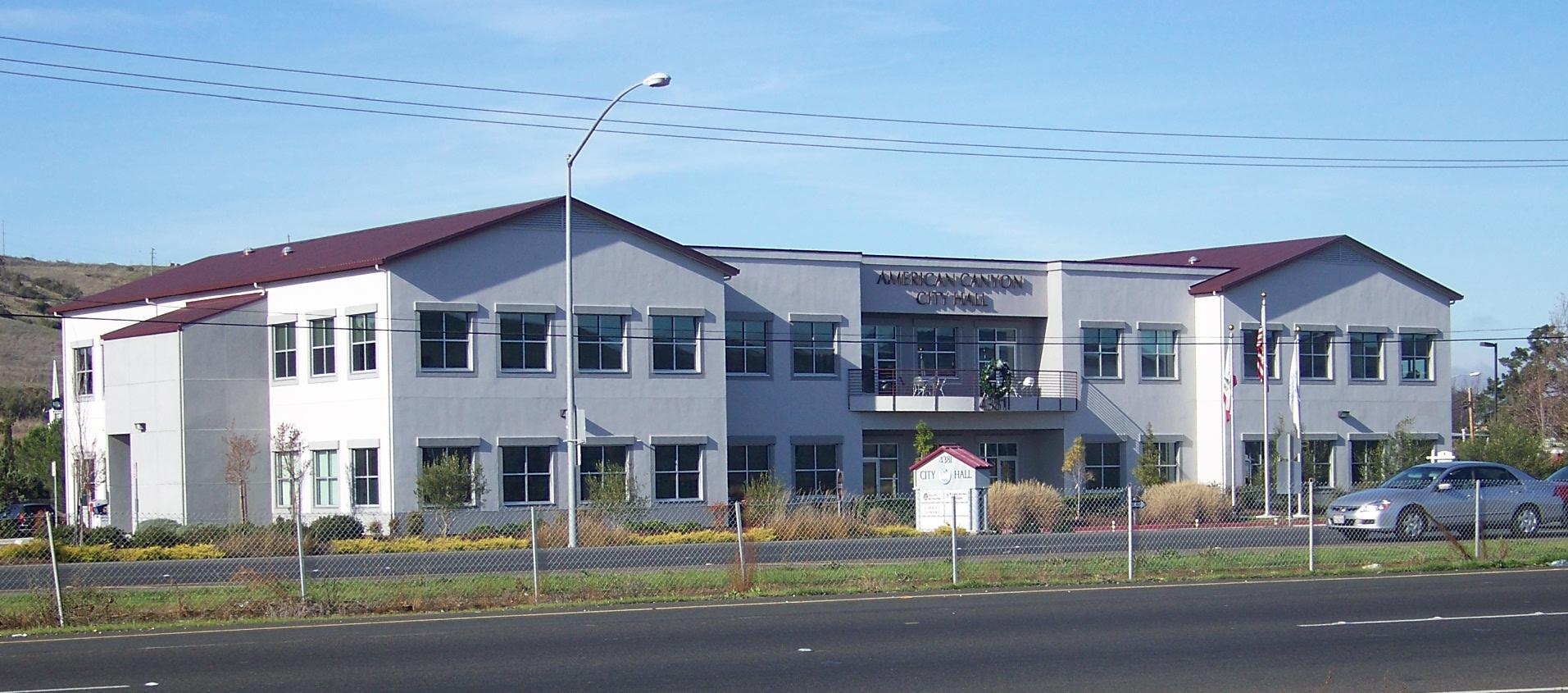
The American Canyon City Hall is located at 4381 Broadway.

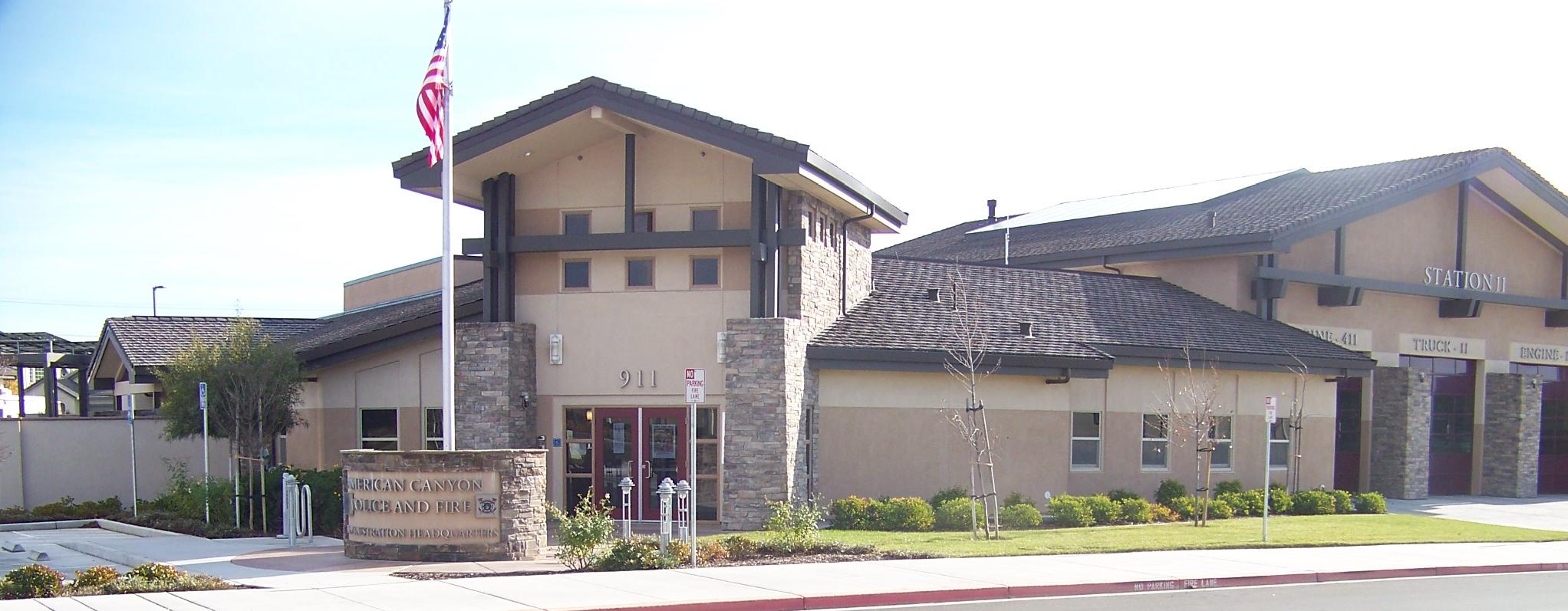
The American Canyon Public Safety Building, located at 911 Donaldson Way East, houses the police department and the fire department.

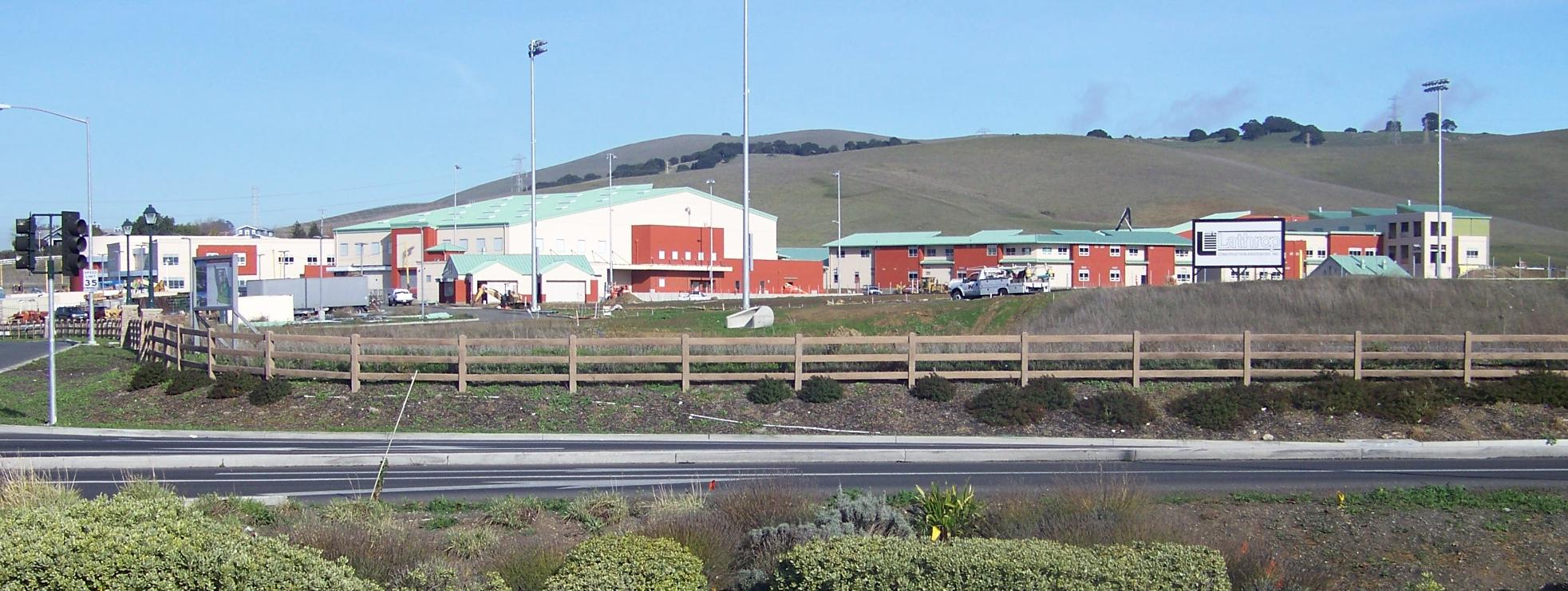
American Canyon High School. Opened on August 18, 2010.

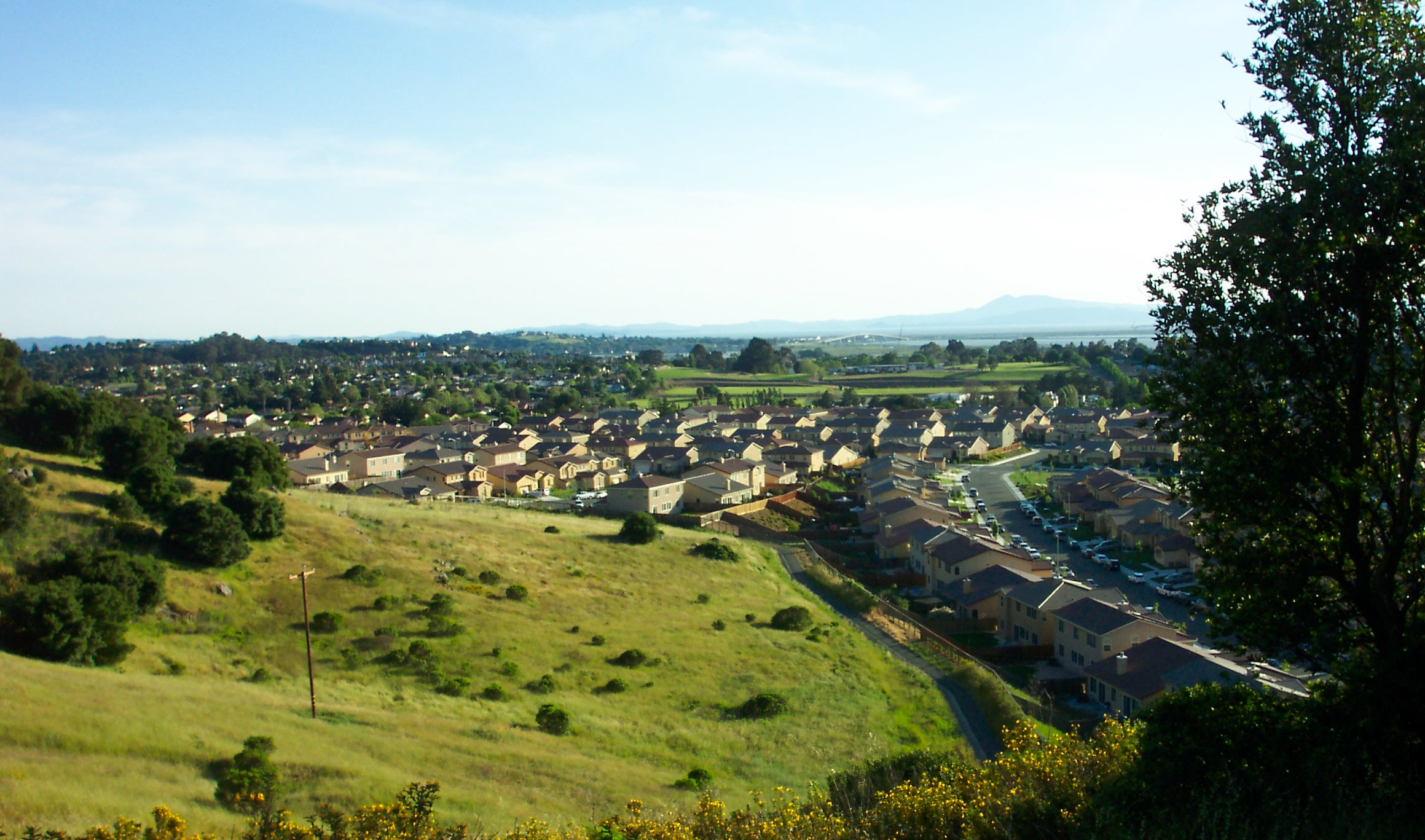
View of the La Vigne neighborhood in American Canyon, California.
