= Dr. Wright L. Lassiter Jr. Early College High School =

Dr. Wright L Lassiter Jr. Early College High School
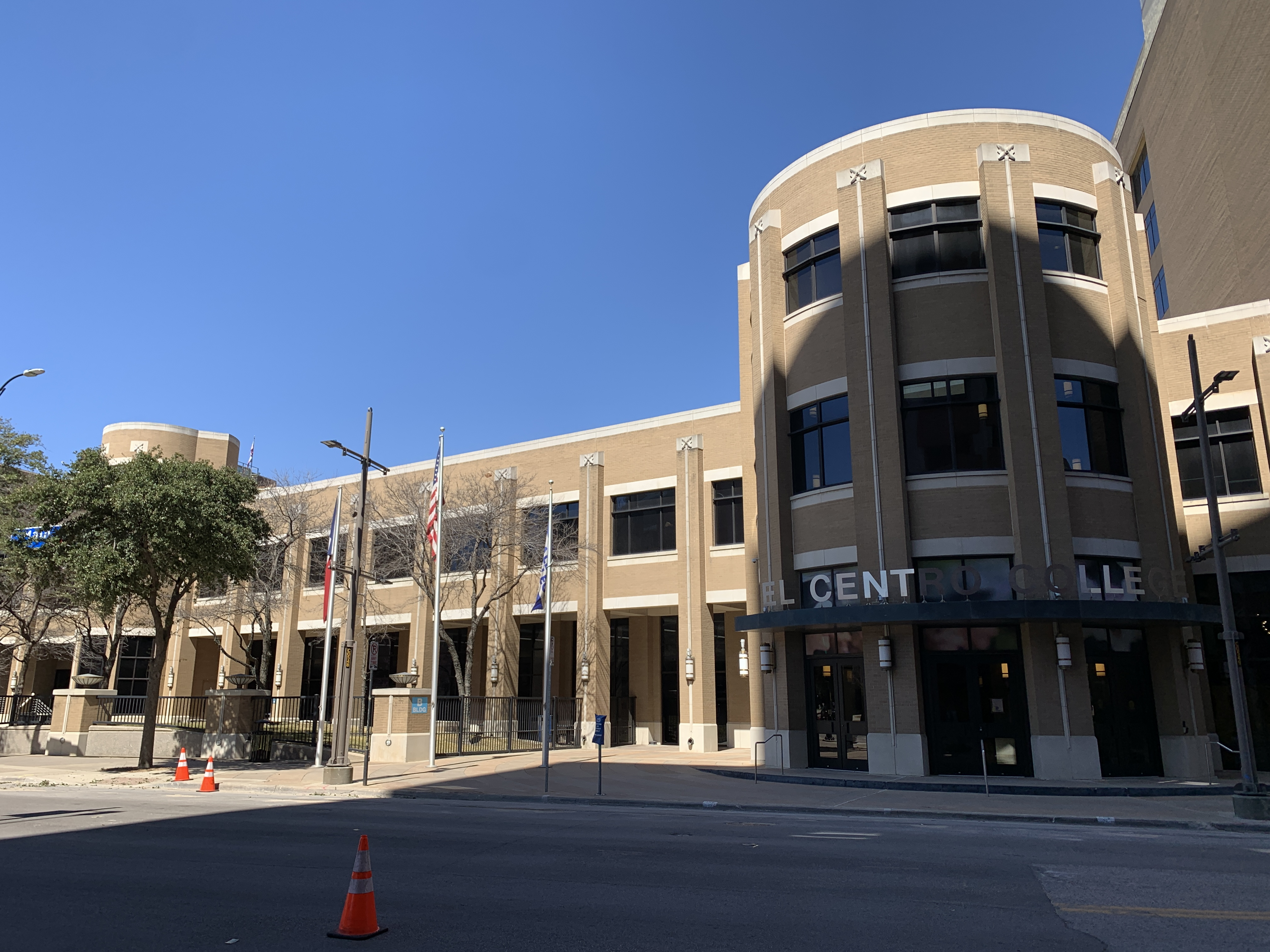

Location
- 701 Elm Street, 1st Floor; Dallas, Texas 75115; United States; 32.779707°N 96.804971°W

Information
- Type: Public high school
- Principal: Yenny Ibarra
- Faculty: 14 (FTE)
- Grades: 9-12
- Enrollment: 226 (2017-18)
- Student to teacher ratio: 16.14
- Color
- Team name: Eagles
- Website: Official Website

Dr. Wright L. Lassiter Jr. Early College High School (LECHS), formerly Middle College High School, is a public high school located at El Centro College in Downtown Dallas, Texas. It is a part of the Dallas Independent School District.

It was established in 1988, and it was later renamed after Wright L. Lassiter Jr., who was the president of El Centro College when LECHS was first established.

In 2014 it won the National Blue Ribbon Award.

In 2015, the school was rated "Met Standard" by the Texas Education Agency.
