= American Canyon High School =

Location
- 3000 Newell Drive; American Canyon, California 94503-1279; United States; 38°10′6″N 122°14′21″W

Information
- Type: Public, Coeducational
- Opened: August 18, 2010
- School district: Napa Valley Unified School District
- NCES District ID: 0626640
- Superintendent: Rosanna Mucetti
- CEEB code: 054406
- Principal: Karin Hatton
- Teaching staff: 69.67 (FTE)
- Grades: 9-12
- Student to teacher ratio: 24.37
- Campus size: 45 acres (18 ha)
- Colors: Black; Gold
- Team name: Wolves
- Newspaper: WolfPrints
- Website: School website
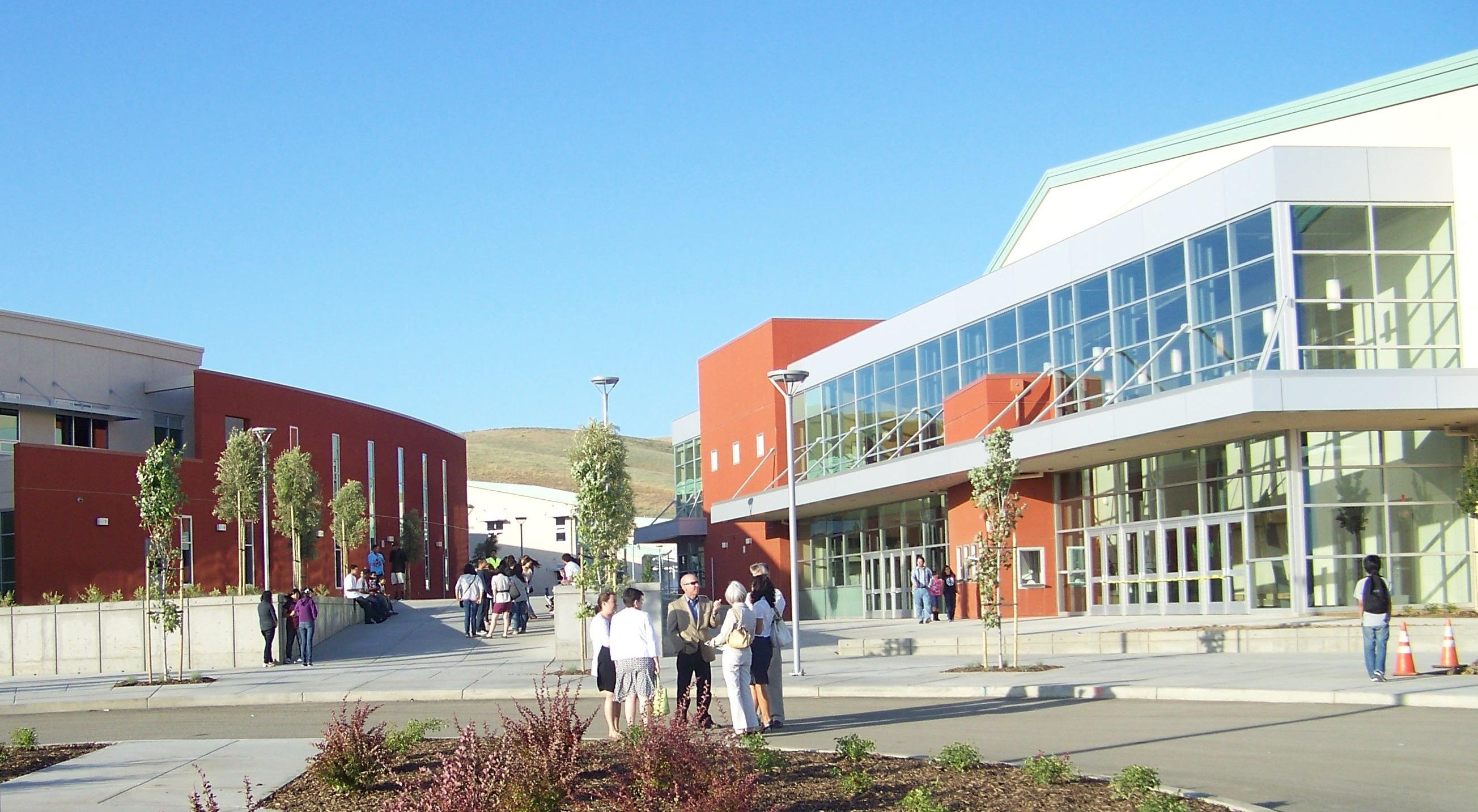

American Canyon High School is a public comprehensive high school located in American Canyon, California. It is operated by the Napa Valley Unified School District.

== History ==
The city of American Canyon, located at the southern end of Napa County, is the fastest growing part of the county. For decades, high school students living in American Canyon were bussed to Vintage High School in the city of Napa, located 15 miles (24 km) to the north. Eventually, strong public support developed for locating a high school in American Canyon.

In 2003 the school district purchased a 49.5 acres (20.0 ha) site for a new high school for $4.5 million.

Voters residing in the Napa Valley Unified School District approved Measure G in November 2006. This $183 million bond measure provided the funding that made construction of American Canyon High School possible, as well as other school improvement projects in the district. The school was designed to incorporate green building principles. Construction began in 2008, and the school was dedicated on June 18, 2010. The construction budget was $169 million.

Classes began for 680 freshmen and sophomores on August 18, 2010. As of the 2012–13 school year, there were students in all four grades, but the school had only reached about half of its full capacity of 2,200 students.

== Campus ==
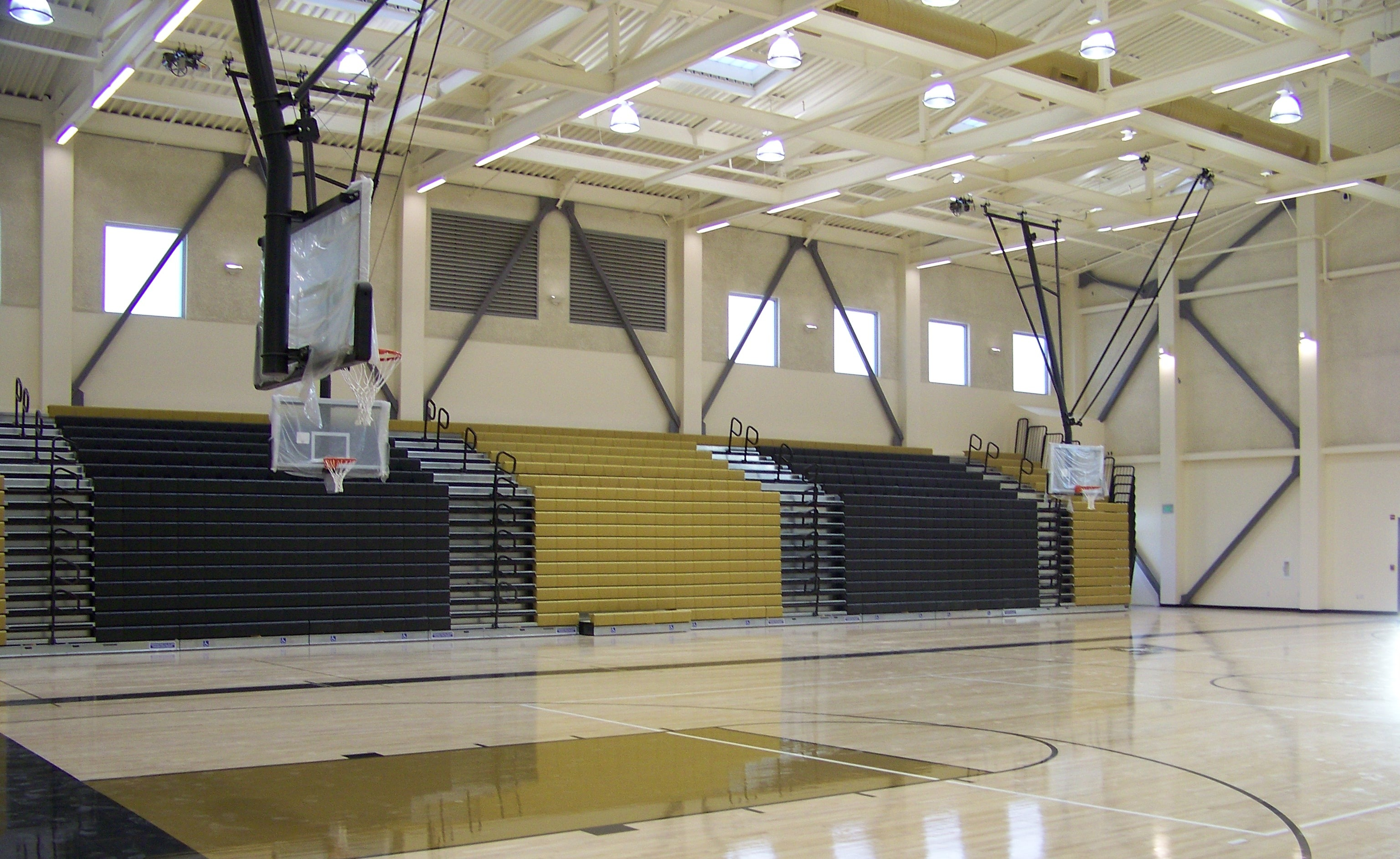
The gymnasium is the largest in Napa County.

The school occupies a 45 acres (18 ha) campus on the northeast corner of American Canyon Road and Newell Drive, and features seven two-story buildings arrayed around a central courtyard. It features a football stadium, baseball and soccer fields, tennis courts, a swimming pool, a 400-seat theater partially funded by the city of American Canyon for community use, and college classrooms funded and operated by Napa Valley College. The school's varsity football team played its first game in the campus stadium under the lights on September 2, 2011. The gymnasium, which seats 2500 people, is the largest in Napa County. The campus is accessible for use by the entire community, not just the high school students.

== Green features ==
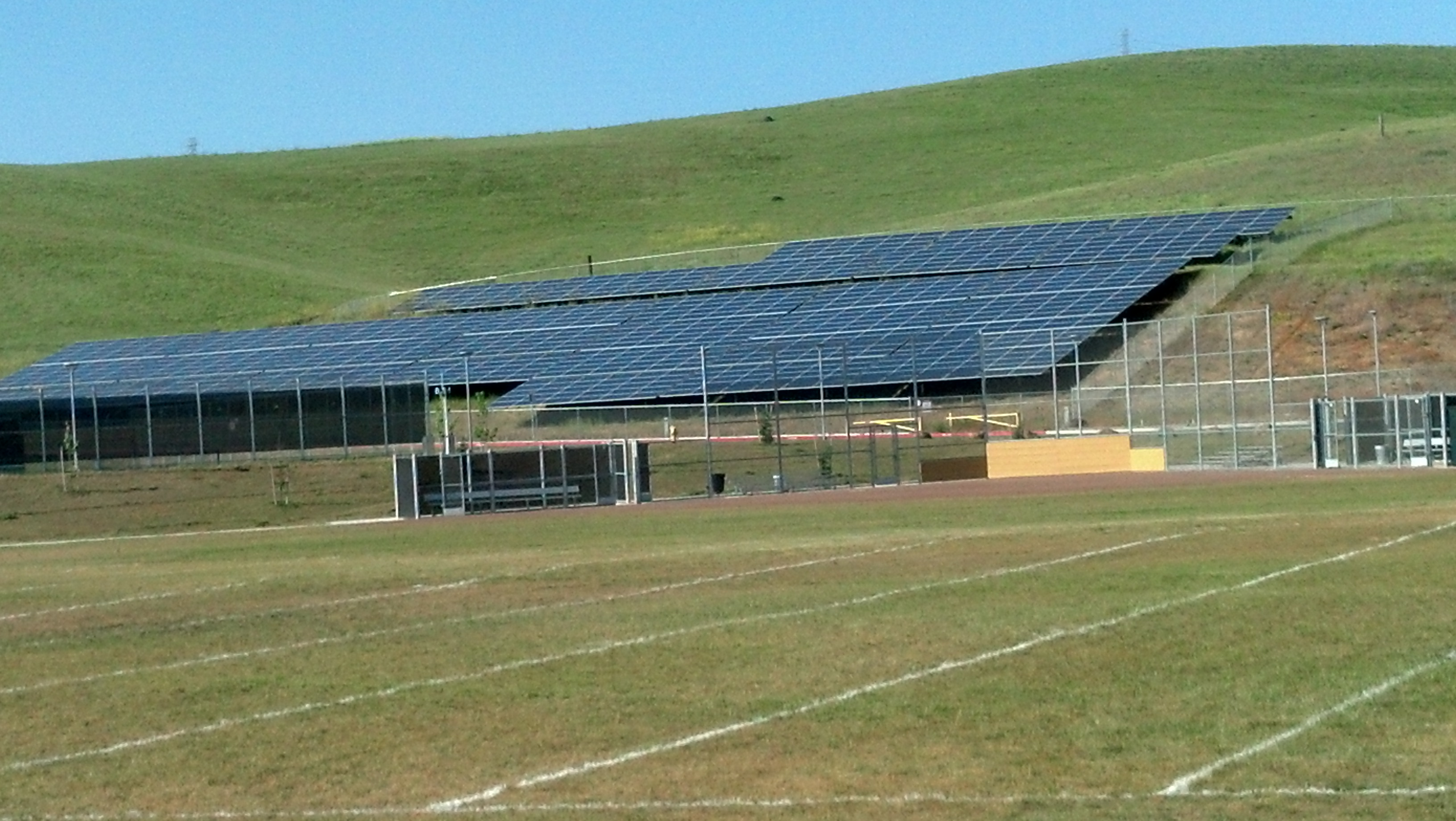
Solar panels installed in 2010

The school was the first in the nation to complete the certification process of the Collaborative for High Performance Schools, a green compliance standard.

The school has natural day lighting in all classrooms, as well as the gymnasium and the multi-purpose room, in order to save electricity. Automatic controls turn off electrical lights when natural lighting is sufficient. It is equipped with low flow water fixtures and the sports fields are irrigated with reclaimed water. It is expected that it will use about half the potable water of a conventional school design of the same size.

Solar photovoltaic panels are integrated into many of the windows. Installation of a $5 million solar photovoltaic field was delayed because of state budget cutbacks. After its dedication on November 16, 2011, the system began generating 1 megawatt of electricity, and produces between 60% and 80% of the school's energy needs.

The high school utilizes an energy efficient geothermal HVAC system based on holes bored deep underground. There are about 300 bores, each 350 feet (110 m) deep. The HVAC system was installed by Bell Products of Napa, CA.

The school district paid $4.6 million to purchase 312 acres (126 ha) of vacant open space in December 2008 in order to mitigate risks to the threatened species known as the California red-legged frog caused by the school construction.
