= Middle College for Technology Careers =

School in Houston, Texas, United States

Middle College for Technology Careers at Texas Southern University (MCTC-HS) was a secondary school located in Houston, Texas, United States.

Middle College, which served grades 9 through 12, was a part of the Houston Independent School District. Middle College, which had Houston ISD's magnet Technology Careers program, was operated in conjunction with Texas Southern University.

== History ==
The school was established in fall 1994 at a Houston Community College (HCC) campus. Originally the school was affiliated with HCC.

In 1998 the school moved to a new location at 3100 Cleburne Street in conjunction with Texas Southern University: the new home was the School of Technology Building. After the Cleburne Street campus developed structural problems, the school later moved to the second floor of the campus of Thomas Middle School at 5655 Selinsky Street.

In fall 2006 the school closed. Some portions of the school were incorporated into Wheatley High School.

== School uniforms ==
Middle College required its students to wear school uniforms.
