= Brett Goodroad =

American painter

- Born: 1979 (age 46–47); Kearney, Nebraska, U.S.
- Education: Montana State University (BFA); San Francisco Art Institute (MFA)
- Known for: Painting
- Awards: Tournesol Award, Headlands Center for the Arts (2012)

Brett Goodroad (born 1979) is an American painter known for landscape-influenced work that moves between figuration and abstraction. He paints largely en plein air, and his paintings have been described as evoking a sense of openness and isolation through their treatment of light, air, and atmosphere. His work received wider critical attention after writer and curator Hilton Als profiled him in The New Yorker in 2021, and Als went on to curate Goodroad's first solo exhibition in New York.

== Early life and education ==
Goodroad was born in 1979 in Kearney, Nebraska, and grew up in rural Montana. He received a Bachelor of Fine Arts from Montana State University and a Master of Fine Arts from the San Francisco Art Institute. While attending the Art Institute, Goodroad was a classmate and close friend of artist Robert Xavier Burden.

== Career ==
After completing his MFA, Goodroad lived and worked in San Francisco, where for a period he supported his painting practice in part by driving trucks for Veritable Vegetable, an organic produce distributor. Early in his career he received fellowships from the Vermont Studio Center (2006) and the Millay Colony for the Arts in New York (2009). In 2012, he received the Tournesol Award from the Headlands Center for the Arts in Marin County, California, an annual award supporting an emerging Bay Area painter with a stipend, studio space, and a culminating exhibition; the award has been credited with helping him develop his mature style. His monograph, A Sequence in Love, was published in 2016.

Goodroad exhibited widely in the San Francisco Bay Area through the 2010s, including shows at Gregory Lind Gallery and the Luggage Store Gallery, and his work was included in group exhibitions at the Berkeley Art Museum and Pacific Film Archive and the Drawing Center in New York. In 2018, he had his first solo exhibition in the United Kingdom at Phoenix Art Space in Brighton, as part of the Brighton Festival.

Goodroad was invited to participate in the festival by his friend, artist David Shrigley.

Following a 2021 solo exhibition at Cushion Works in San Francisco, Goodroad's work drew the attention of Hilton Als, who wrote about the show in The New Yorker and later curated Goodroad's first New York solo exhibition, presented jointly by Greene Naftali and Cushion Works in 2022. Goodroad relocated from San Francisco to a small town in Arizona. He has continued to exhibit at Greene Naftali in New York, including the solo exhibitions Rainy (2024) and On Landscape (2024), as well as at ADZ Gallery in Lisbon.

== Critical reception ==
Writing in The New Yorker, Hilton Als described Goodroad's paintings as seeming to "want to devour the very subjects that inspire them," a tension between figuration and abstraction that has become a recurring theme in critical writing about his work. His work was included in critic Jack Bankowsky's year-end "Best of 2021" list in Artforum, and has also been reviewed in Art in America, the San Francisco Chronicle, and The Manhattan Art Review.

== Collections ==
Goodroad's work is held in the permanent collections of the Museum of Contemporary Art, Los Angeles and the Berkeley Art Museum and Pacific Film Archive.

== Personal life ==
Goodroad is a lute player. He currently resides in Northern California.
