= San Diego Ostrich Ranch =

Ostrich farm in Escondido, California

Coordinates: 33.0807°N 117.0332°W

- Town/City: Escondido
- State: California
- Country: United States
- Established: 1986
- Owner: Phil Sargent; Margaret Sargent
- Area: 35 acres

San Diego Ostrich Ranch was an ostrich farm in Escondido, California. The ranch opened in 1986 and 100 ostriches lived on the 35 acre property owned by Phil and Margaret Sargent, located near the San Diego Wild Animal Park.

== History ==
Philip and Margaret Sargent, along with their three daughters, built a yacht and sailed from Richards Bay, South Africa to San Diego, California to start the San Diego Ostrich Ranch in 1986. The Escondido property was 35 acres on San Pasqual Valley Road.

In 1992, Philip Andrew Rhodes Sargent was arrested after an investigation by United States Fish and Wildlife Service who determined Rhodes had illegally smuggled almost 200 eggs into the country from South Africa through chocolate boxes. Sargent agreed to leave the country, but was fined $50,000 and rearrested after attending an ostrich convention in Las Vegas. An embargo prevented Sargent from importing live birds, meat, feathers or hides.
