= Rincon bleachers =

Skate spot in California, USA

Coordinates: 33.1577°N 117.0827°W

The Rincon Big Four is a famous skate spot in Escondido, California, USA that has shown up numerous times in skateboard media outlets, such as videos and magazines. It is located at Rincon Middle School, which has been a popular landmark for skateboarding for over a decade. In 1997, Jamie Thomas found a newly built bleacher set for shaded basketball.

== Description ==
Rincon consists of a shaded bleacher set, with smooth concrete for skating. There are four sets of bleachers (four levels from top to bottom), as well as a tall rail has been used as a skateboarding obstacle.

== Difficulty ==
Rincon is considered a difficult spot to skateboard; containing both elements of height and length. Being a bleacher set, each tier is the size of three average-sized steps (there are two steps connecting each level), making it as tall as an average flight of twelve stairs. If a skateboarder chooses to do something over the railing, the height, and therefore the impact on the skater, is even greater. Renowned skateboarder Chris Cole describes it as "the most scared I've ever been skating...No matter what, you're going all the way down".

Skateboarding on the rail is considered difficult for a few reasons:

1. Getting on to the rail, because you must go over the first tier, and up onto the rail to perform a maneuver on it.
2. Sliding/grinding across the rail is difficult because the rail is very steep and short; much different from what skateboarders normally skate.
3. The impact of landing after a trick on the rail is high, because from the end of the rail to the ground, it is about a six-foot drop.
