= Valley High School (Escondido, California) =

Coordinates: 33°09′01.17″N 117°01′55.43″W

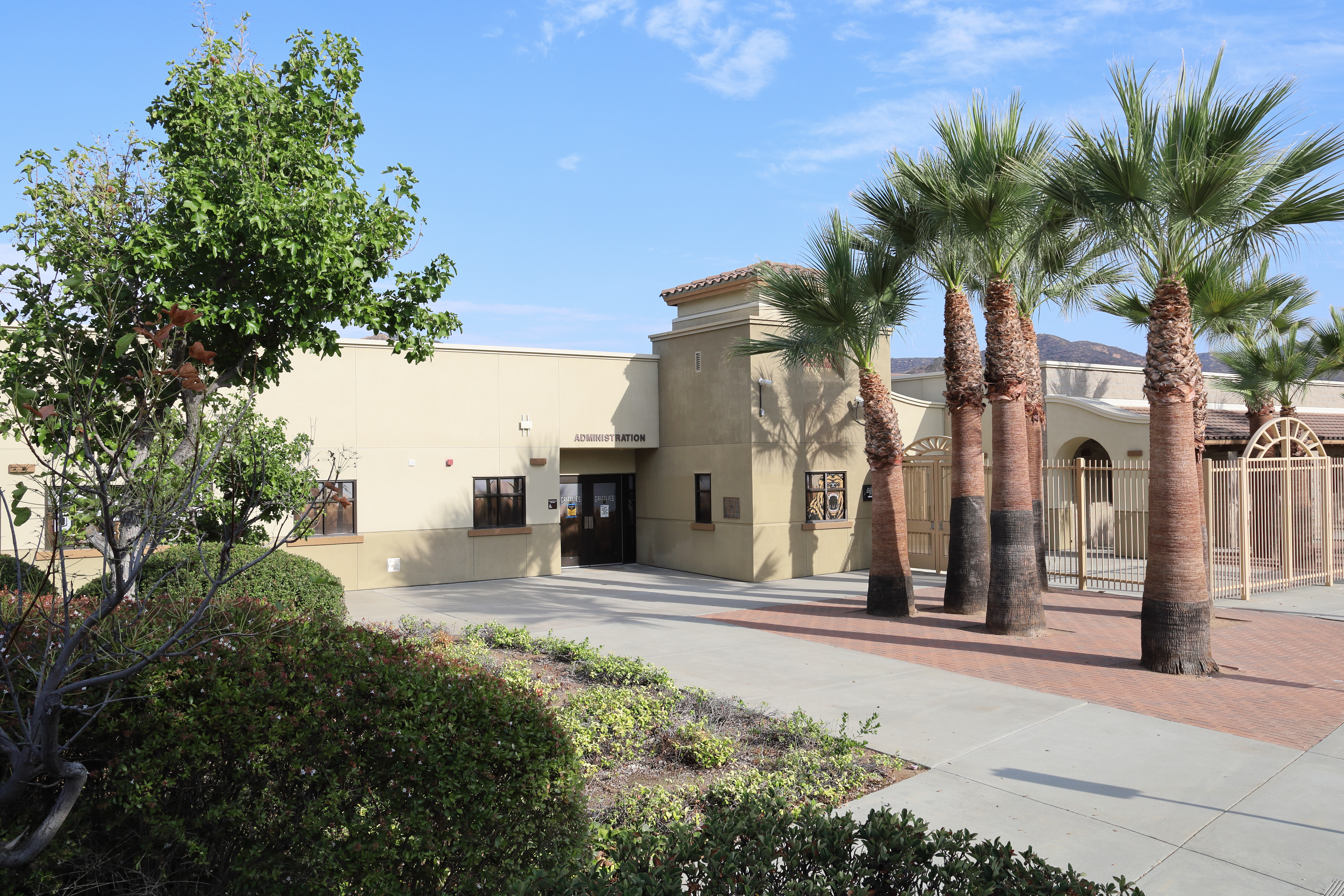

Location
- 410 North Hidden Trails Road; Escondido, California, 92027

Information
- Type: Public High School
- Motto: Learning For All Whatever It Takes
- Principal: Cory Gregory
- Staff: 17.48 (FTE)
- Grades: 10-12
- Enrollment: 279 (2023–2024)
- Student to teacher ratio: 15.96
- Color
- Mascot: Grizzly Bear
- Website: www.vhsgrizzlies.org

Valley High School (VHS) is an alternative, continuation high school, part of the Escondido Union High School District in Escondido, California. VHS has nearly thirty to fifty new students every month.

== Response-Ability Training Program ==
Response-Ability Training Program (RTP) is a Quarter 9 week long program/class that all newly enrolled students at Valley High are required to attend before becoming full-time students, and before receiving a full class schedule at Valley. The training program teaches many things including the importance of an education, personal responsibility, respecting others and always coming to school prepared.
