= Robert Xavier Burden =

Canadian artist

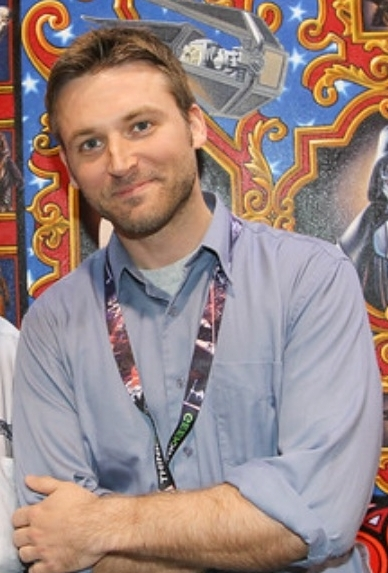
- Born: July 8, 1982 (age 43); Hamilton, Ontario
- Citizenship: Canadian
- Known for: Painting
- Movement: Pop Surrealism, Contemporary Icon painting
- Website: www.robertxburden.com

Robert Xavier Burden is a Canadian artist currently based in California. He is best known for his large-scale decorative oil paintings depicting his childhood action figures, set against wallpaper and fabric patterns from his childhood home.

== Early life and education ==
Burden was born in 1982 in Hamilton, Ontario. He drew at a very early age, and started painting seriously at the age of 16.

As a youth, Burden played competitive ice hockey. He was a minor hockey league teammate of future NHL players Brad Boyes and Steve Ott. Burden was twice awarded the MVP of his high school varsity hockey team.

In 2005, he completed his BFA in Art and Art History at Queen's University.

In 2007, he received his MFA from the San Francisco Art Institute in California.

== Career ==
While at the Art Institute, Burden was awarded the Irène Pijoan Memorial Painting Award. He was also the recipient of the Murphy and Cadogan Fellowship. Burden briefly held part-time faculty positions at City College of San Francisco and Pixar Animation Studios in Emeryville, California. He received a large amount of attention for his 15 foot by 8 foot oil painting The 20th Century Space Opera, which depicts over 150 different vintage Star Wars action figures. The painting received mixed reviews, and was featured on ABC News, StarWars.com, and The Chicago Tribune. Wired Magazine wrote a news article about the painting under the headline The $200k Star Wars Painting That No One Will Ever Buy.

== Exhibitions ==
Burden's work has been exhibited at galleries and museums throughout North America, including The Carnegie Arts Center, The MOAH, The Lesher Center For The Arts, The Huntsville Museum of Art, The California Center For The Arts, Escondido, La Luz De Jesus Gallery, Roq La Rue Gallery, Gregorio Escalante Gallery, and Oceanside Museum of Art.

== Personal life ==
After meeting as art students at Queen's University, Burden was in a long-term relationship with curator Aimee Ng. He currently resides in Southern California.

== Public collections ==
- Mattel, Inc
- UCLA Mattel Children's Hospital
