= Escondido, California =

City in California, United States

- City
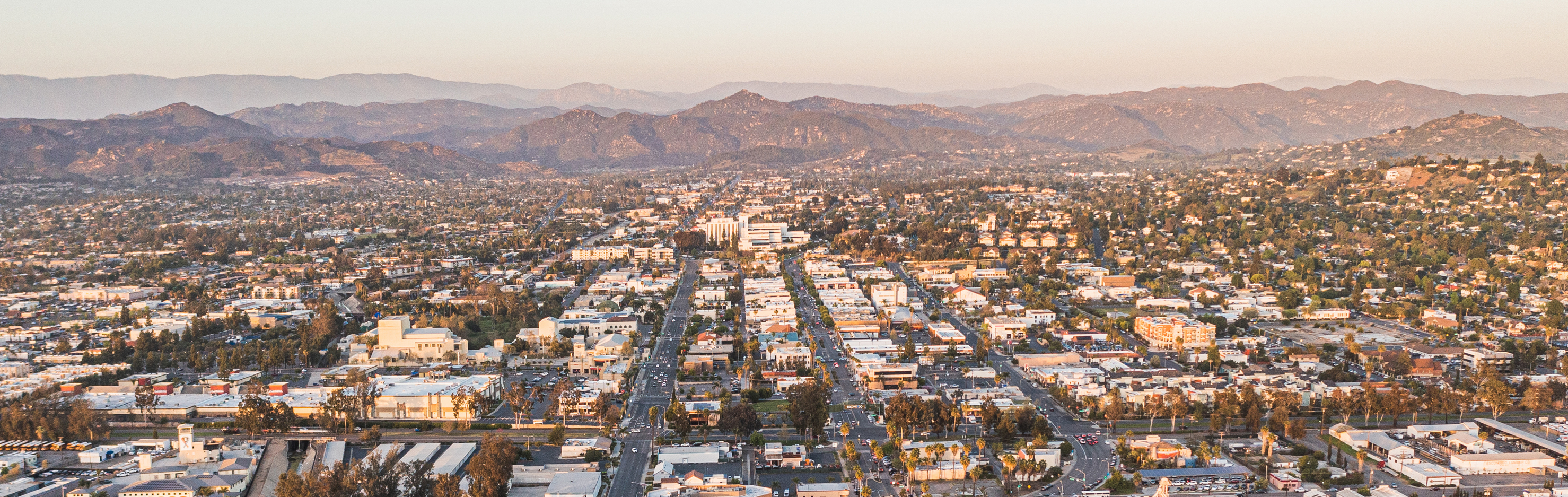
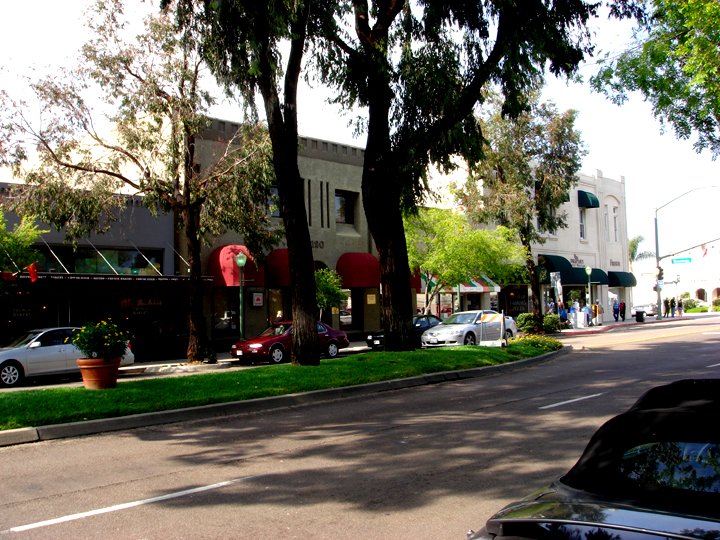
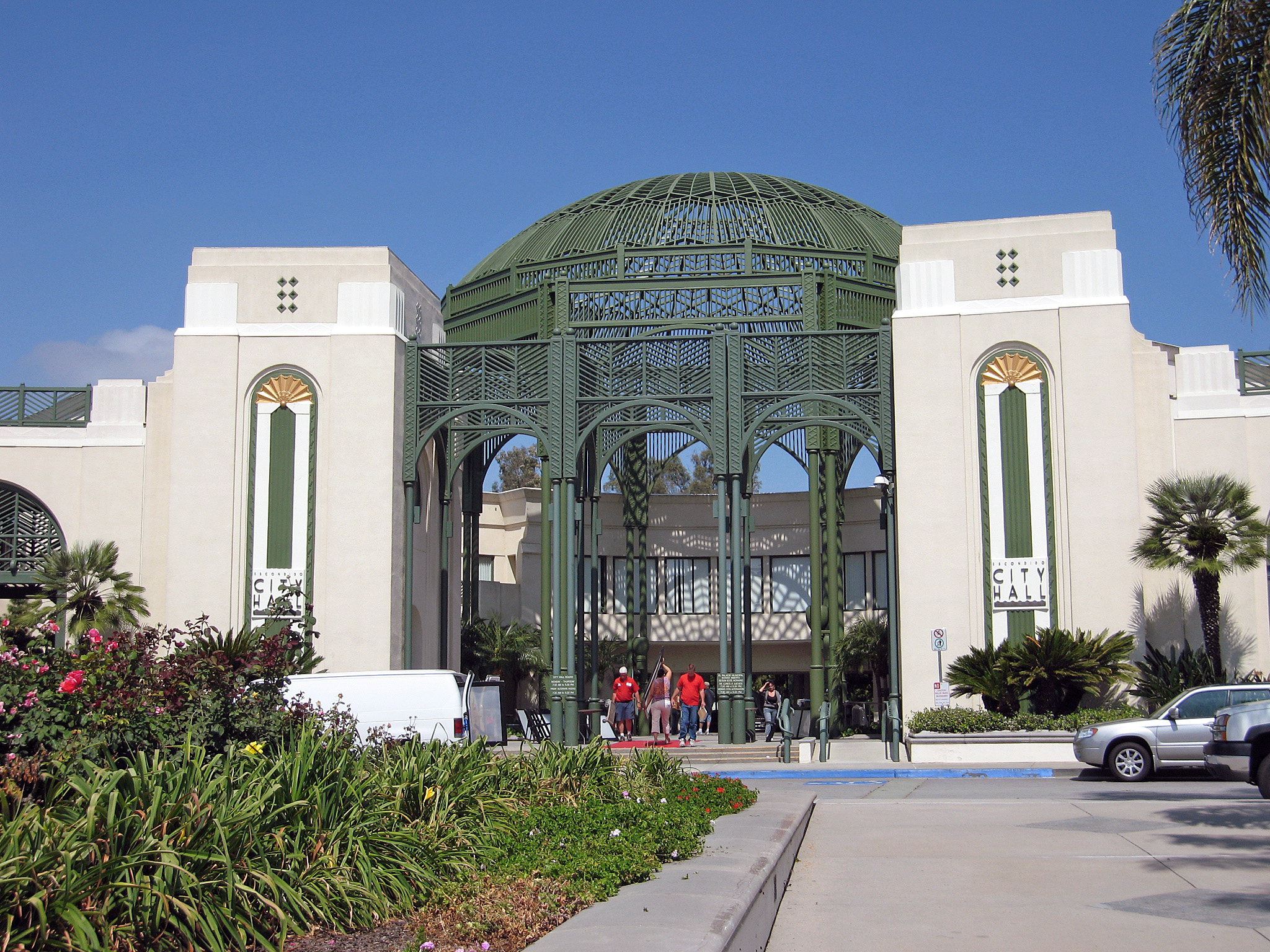
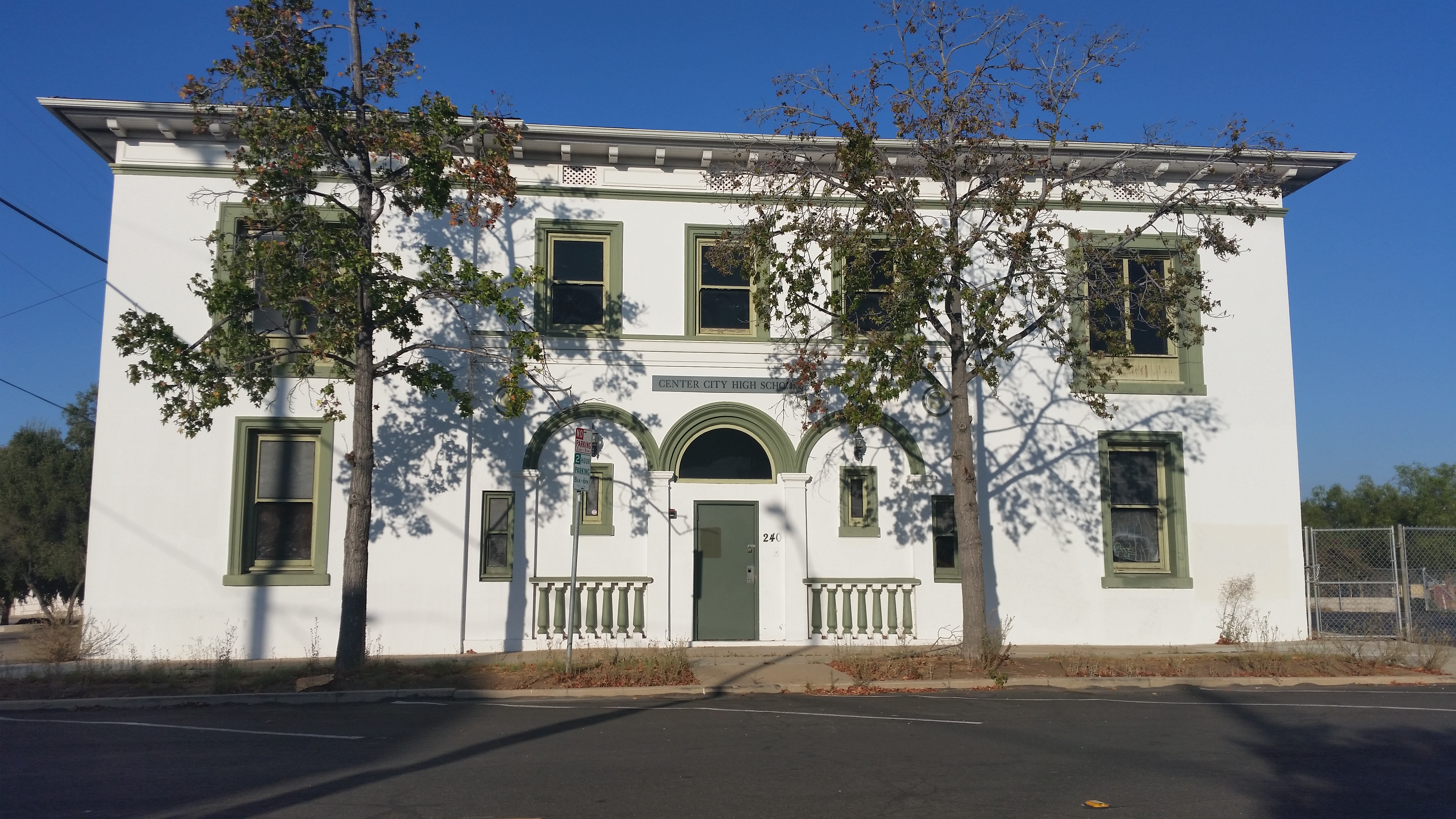
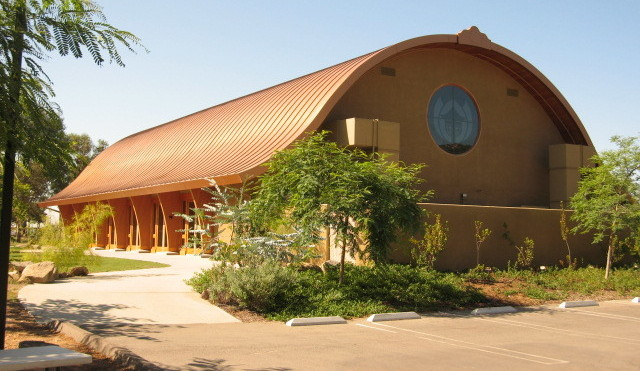
- Clockwise from top right: aerial view of Escondido; City Hall; Deer Park Monastery; Center City High School; Downtown

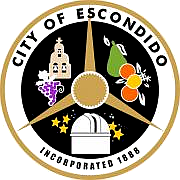
- Flag Seal
- Motto: "City of Choice!"
- Interactive map of Escondido, California
- Location within California Location within the United States
- Coordinates: 33°7′29″N 117°4′51″W
- Country: United States
- State: California
- County: San Diego
- Incorporated: October 8, 1888

Government
  - Type: Council-Manager
  - Mayor: Dane White (R)

Area
  - Total: 37.45 sq mi (97.00 km^{2})
  - Land: 37.34 sq mi (96.72 km^{2})
  - Water: 0.11 sq mi (0.28 km^{2}) 0.28%
- Elevation: 646 ft (197 m)

Population (2020)
  - Total: 151,038
  - Rank: 4th in San Diego County; 38th in California
  - Density: 4,060.1/sq mi (1,567.61/km^{2})
- Time zone: UTC-08:00 (PST)
  - Summer (DST): UTC-07:00 (PDT)
- ZIP codes: 92025–92027, 92029
- Area codes: 442/760
- FIPS code: 06-22804
- GNIS feature IDs: 1652706, 2410455
- Website: www.escondido.gov

Escondido (Spanish for 'hidden') is a city in San Diego County, California, United States. Located in the North County region, it was incorporated in 1888, and is one of the oldest cities in San Diego County. It has a population of 151,038 as of the 2020 census.

== Etymology ==
"Escondido" is a Spanish word meaning "hidden". One source says the name originally referred to agua escondida or hidden water or valley; another says it meant "hidden treasure".

== History ==
The Escondido area was first settled by the Luiseño, who established campsites and villages along the creek running through the area. They named the place Mixéelum Pompáwvo or "Mehel-om-pom-pavo." The Luiseno also had another village north of Mixéelum Pompáwvo called Panakare. The Kumeyaay migrated from areas near the Colorado River, settling both in San Pasqual Valley and near the San Dieguito River in the southwestern and western portions of what is now Escondido. Most of the villages and campsites today have been destroyed by development and agriculture.

=== Spanish and Mexican eras ===
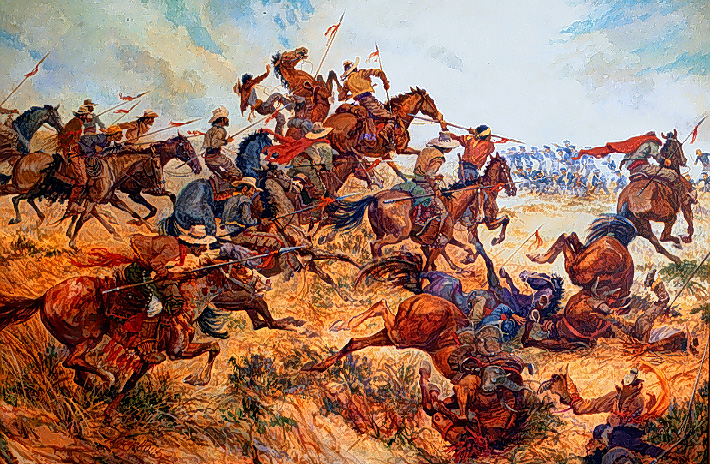
The 1846 Battle of San Pasqual was a battle between American and Californio forces during the U.S. Conquest of California.

Spain controlled the land from the late 18th century to the early 19th century, and established many missions in California to convert the indigenous people. When Mexico gained its independence from Spain, the local land was divided into large ranchos. Most of what is now Escondido occupies the former Rancho Rincon del Diablo ("Devil's Corner"), a Mexican land grant given to Juan Bautista Alvarado (not the governor of the same name) in 1843 by Governor Manuel Micheltorena. Alvarado was a regidor of Los Angeles at the time, and the first Regidor of Pueblo San Diego. The southern part of Escondido occupies the former Rancho San Bernardo, granted in 1842 and 1845.

In 1846, during the Mexican–American War, the Battle of San Pasqual was fought southeast of Escondido. This battle pitted Mexican forces under Andrés Pico (brother of then-California-governor Pío Pico) against Americans under Stephen W. Kearny, Archibald Gillespie, and Kit Carson. A park in Escondido is named for Carson.

=== American era ===
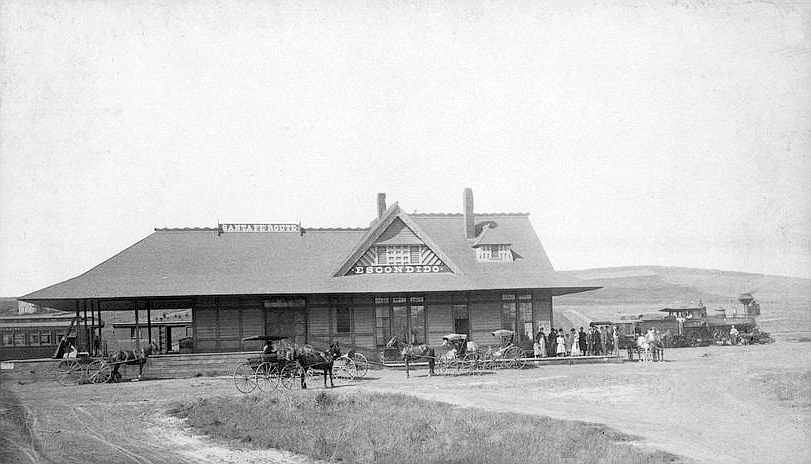
Atchison, Topeka and Santa Fe Railway depot in Escondido, c. 1887–1889

The city was home to a largely Spanish-speaking population in the first census, taken in 1850 when California became a state. After statehood, non-Hispanic settlers came to Southern California in increasing numbers, many of them from the Midwestern states. The decade of the 1880s is known as the "Southern California Land Boom" because so many people moved to the state.

In 1853, pro-Southern Copperheads proposed dividing the state of California to create a new Territory of Colorado (at this time the territory that would become the state of Colorado was named "Jefferson"). San Diego Judge Oliver S. Witherby suggested placing the capitol of the new territory in Rancho Rincon del Diablo. He envisioned a railroad connecting San Diego to Fort Yuma through an area about two miles (3 km) south of the current Escondido site, heading east through San Pasqual. With a series of deeds in 1855 and 1856, the rancho was transferred from the heirs of Juan Bautista Alvarado to Witherby. He planned to profit from the town that he believed would be established from the dividing point on the railroad below the eastern hills. The proposal for splitting the state and creating the new territory passed in the California legislature, but died in Congress in the run-up to the Civil War. It was effectively killed in 1861 when Congress organized the Territory of Colorado in the area previously occupied by the Jefferson Territory. With Witherby's vision of owning a bustling state capitol unrealized, he set up a mining operation on the rancho instead.

In 1868, Witherby sold the rancho for $8,000 to Edward McGeary and John, Josiah, and Matthew Wolfskill. McGeary owned half the rancho, while the three Wolfskill brothers each owned an equal share of the other half. John Wolfskill farmed sheep, horses, and cattle on the rancho for a number of years. Wolfskill had frequent conflicts with the Couts family, owners of the neighboring Guajome, Buena Vista, and San Marcos ranchos, over grazing lands and watering holes.

In October 1883, a group of Los Angeles investors purchased Rancho Rincon del Diablo. This group sold the land to the newly formed Escondido Company in 1884. On December 18, 1885, investors incorporated the Escondido Land and Town Company, and in 1886 this company purchased the 12,814-acre (52 km^{2}) area for approximately $100,000. Two years later, in 1888, Escondido was incorporated as a city; the vote was 64 in favor of cityhood with 12 votes against. The Santa Fe rail line was laid in the 1880s. The opening of U.S. Route 395 in 1930 boosted economic growth in Escondido.

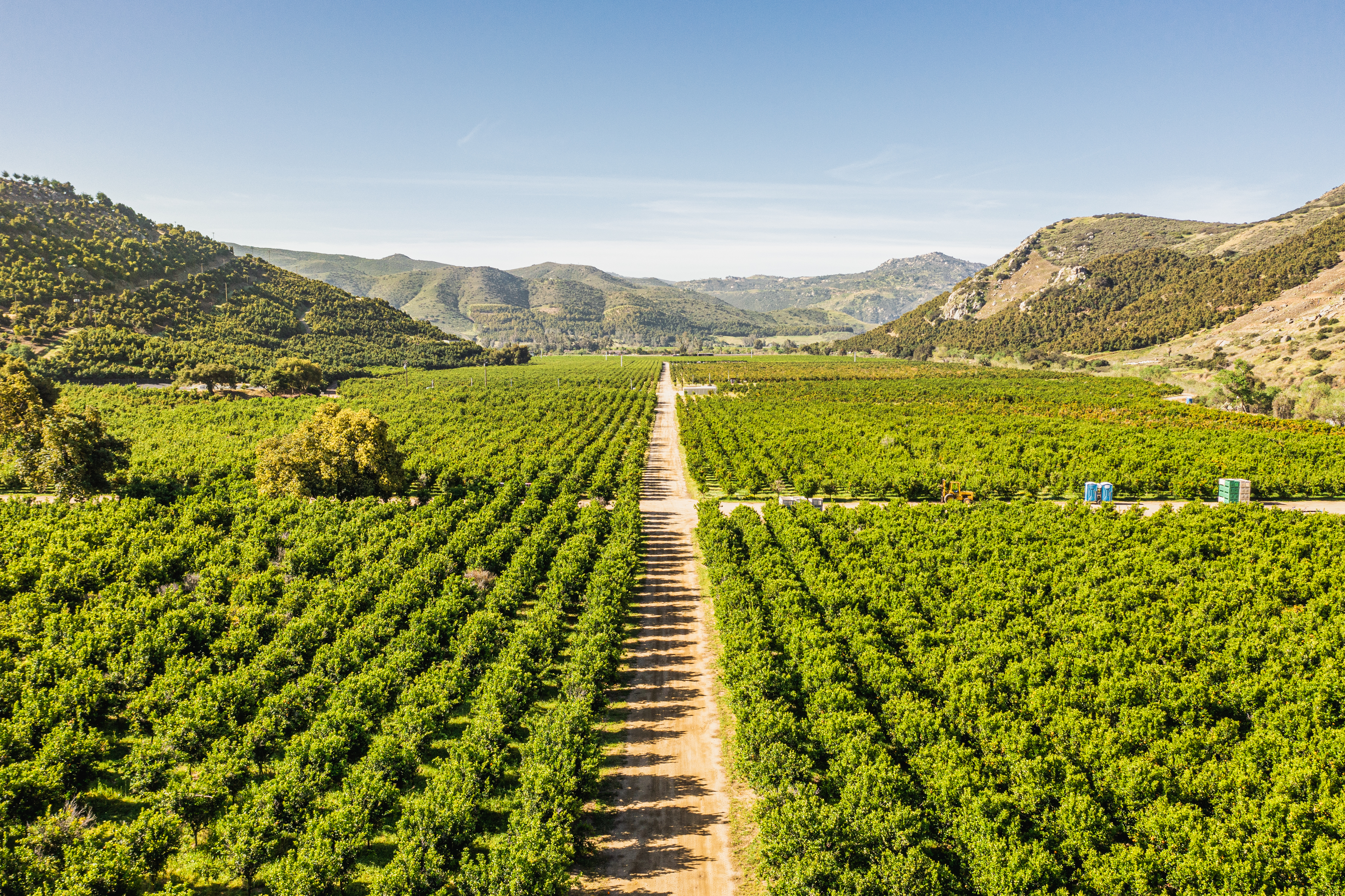
Aerial view of a citrus orchard in the San Pasqual Valley in Escondido

Escondido was primarily an agricultural community, growing muscat grapes initially. After a dam was built in 1894–1895 to form what is known today as Lake Wohlford, orange and lemon trees were planted in large numbers, as were olive and walnut trees. By the 1960s, avocados became the largest local crop. Since the 1970s, Escondido has lost most of its agricultural land to housing developments, but still retains a significant agricultural presence in the San Pasqual Valley, including vineyards, citrus orchards, and avocado orchards.

In 1986, the 35 acre San Diego Ostrich Ranch was home to 100 ostriches.

== Geography ==
According to the United States Census Bureau, the city has a total area of 37.0 square miles (96 km^{2}). 36.8 square miles (95 km^{2}) of it is land and 0.2 square miles (0.52 km^{2}) of it is water. The total area is 0.48% water.

Escondido is also bordered by San Marcos to the west and northern San Diego to the south.

The city contains several neighborhoods, including:

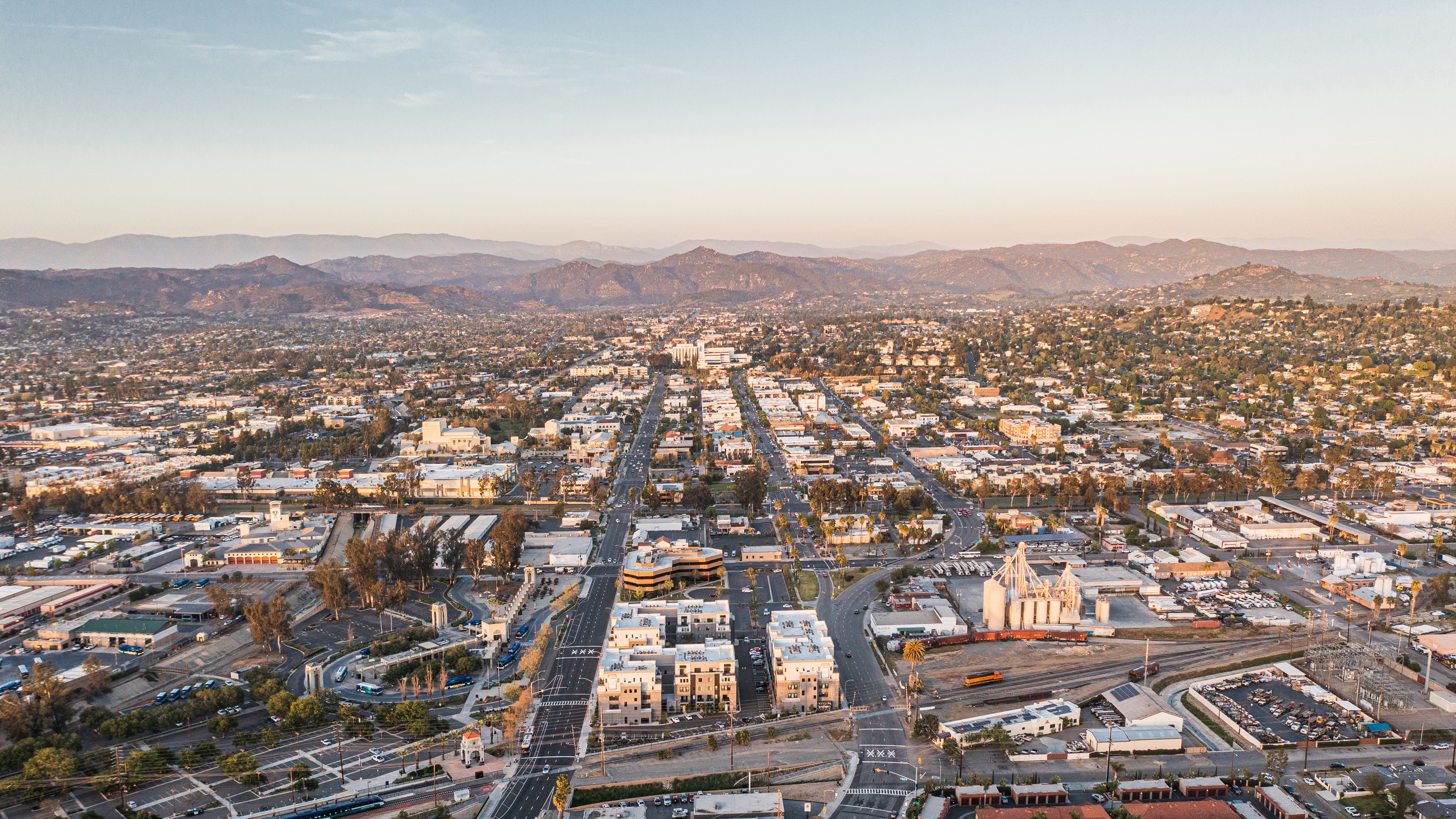
- Sunset aerial view of downtown Escondido
  Downtown Escondido centers on Grand Avenue between Centre City Parkway and the site of the old Palomar Hospital. The city's general plan defines the Downtown Specific Plan Area as approximately 460 acres (1.9 km^{2}) bounded by Centre City Parkway on the west, Hickory and Ivy Streets on the east, Washington Avenue on the north, and Fifth Avenue on the south, with an additional narrow section extending west along Valley Parkway to Interstate 15. Downtown Escondido includes a mix of coffee shops, restaurants, assorted retail, art galleries, bakeries, a comedy club, and the historic Ritz Theater.
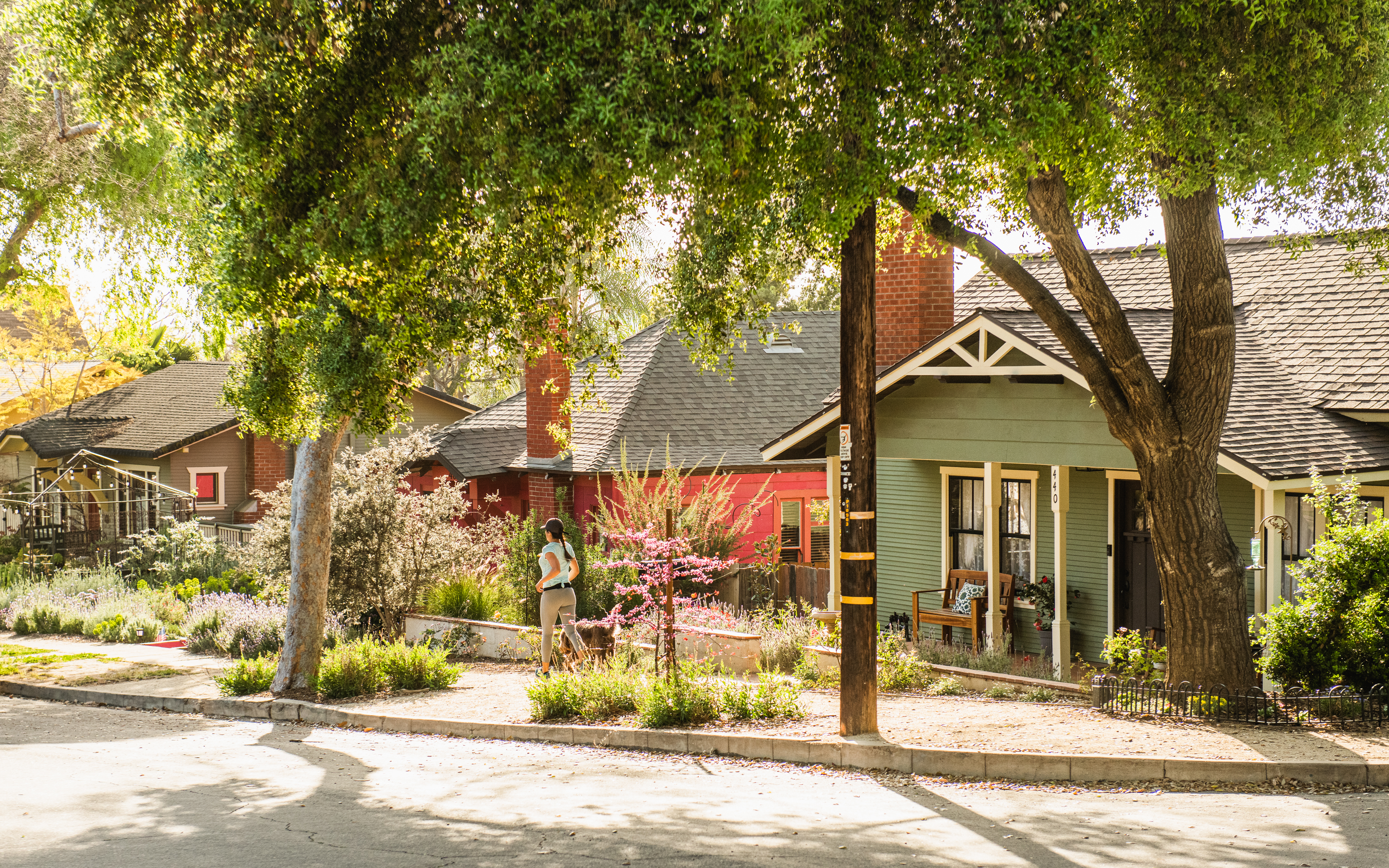
- Neighborhood view in Old Escondido Historic District in Escondido
  Old Escondido Historic District is bounded by Escondido Boulevard on the west, Chestnut Street on the east, Fifth Avenue on the north, and Thirteenth Avenue on the south. This area is made up of mostly single-family residential housing built in the late 1800s and early 1900s in the Victorian and Craftsman styles and is a 5- to 10-minute walk to Grand Avenue in Downtown Escondido.

The Escondido Creek bisects the city. It originates at the Lake Wohlford Dam in the northeast, passes through downtown and leaves the city through the Harmony Grove area in the southwest before eventually emptying into the San Elijo Lagoon. The creek path through the city was developed into a concrete flood control channel in the 1960s. A class I bicycle path runs along most of the channel's length.

The community of Valley Center is located just northeast of Escondido. Valley View Casino, owned by the San Pasqual Band of Diegueno Mission Indians, is located in Valley Center.

Natural vegetation types in the Escondido area include chaparral brushland, oak woodland, riparian (stream) woodland, and grassland. The Daley Ranch Preserve north of the city includes areas representative of this vegetation.

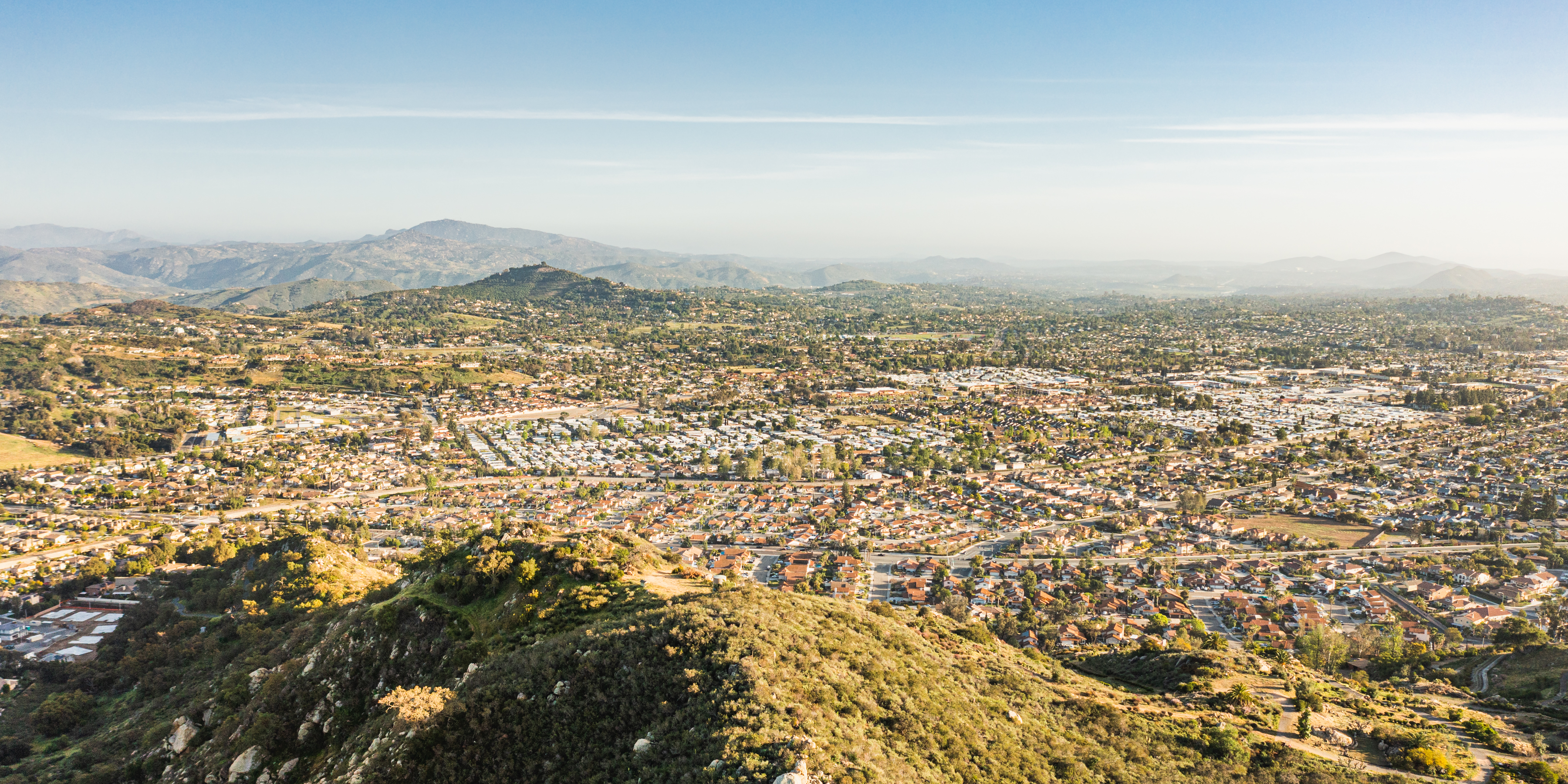
Looking south across Escondido from over Dixon Lake. At the very left in the distance is the peak of El Cajon Mountain, with Mount Woodson looming closer at left of center. Farther right is the flattened rise of Twin Peaks, with Black Mountain at right side of the frame.

=== Climate ===
Escondido has a borderline semi-arid climate (Köppen: BSh) and hot-summer Mediterranean climate (Köppen: Csa) with hot summers and mild, wet winters. Owing to its inland setting, it is considerably hotter than coastal cities like San Diego, Carlsbad or Oceanside during the summertime, and cooler in the winter. The climate is mild enough to allow widespread cultivation of avocados and oranges. Escondido is located in plant hardiness zone 10a. The hottest temperature recorded in Escondido was 115 °F or 46.1 °C on September 6, 2020. The coldest temperature recorded in Escondido was 13 °F or −10.6 °C on January 2, 1901, and January 7, 1913.

Yearly precipitation averages around 15 inches (380 mm) and can vary considerably from year to year. The wettest "rain year" from July 1940 to June 1941 totalled 31.73 inches or 805.9 millimeters, but in the driest "rain year" from July 2013 to June 2014 just 5.75 inches or 146.1 millimeters fell. The wettest month has been January 1916 with 19.55 inches or 496.6 millimeters, and the greatest 24-hour rainfall 6.47 inches or 164.3 millimeters on February 16, 1927. Rainfall totals are higher in the hills to the north and east, with 20–24 inches or 510–610 millimeters falling in most areas above 2,000 feet (610 m) in elevation, and over 30 inches or 760 millimeters on Palomar Mountain, 15 miles (24 km) to the east. More than 80% of all precipitation takes place from November through March. Snow is virtually unheard of, though occasionally winter and springtime thunderstorms will drop small hail.

Climate data for Escondido No 2, California (1991–2020 normals, extremes 1893–present)
Month	Jan	Feb	Mar	Apr	May	Jun	Jul	Aug	Sep	Oct	Nov	Dec	Year
Record high °F (°C)	92 (33)	95 (35)	97 (36)	103 (39)	106 (41)	109 (43)	112 (44)	103 (39)	115 (46)	106 (41)	100 (38)	96 (36)	115 (46)
Mean maximum °F (°C)	83.0 (28.3)	83.3 (28.5)	85.9 (29.9)	90.3 (32.4)	92.1 (33.4)	94.4 (34.7)	98.1 (36.7)	99.7 (37.6)	101.8 (38.8)	96.8 (36.0)	88.5 (31.4)	80.9 (27.2)	104.7 (40.4)
Mean daily maximum °F (°C)	68.8 (20.4)	68.7 (20.4)	71.0 (21.7)	74.2 (23.4)	76.7 (24.8)	81.9 (27.7)	87.2 (30.7)	89.0 (31.7)	86.9 (30.5)	80.8 (27.1)	74.6 (23.7)	68.0 (20.0)	77.3 (25.2)
Daily mean °F (°C)	56.8 (13.8)	57.3 (14.1)	59.9 (15.5)	63.0 (17.2)	66.6 (19.2)	71.1 (21.7)	75.8 (24.3)	77.2 (25.1)	75.0 (23.9)	69.1 (20.6)	61.9 (16.6)	55.9 (13.3)	65.8 (18.8)
Mean daily minimum °F (°C)	44.8 (7.1)	45.9 (7.7)	48.9 (9.4)	51.8 (11.0)	56.4 (13.6)	60.2 (15.7)	64.4 (18.0)	65.3 (18.5)	63.1 (17.3)	57.3 (14.1)	49.1 (9.5)	43.8 (6.6)	54.3 (12.4)
Mean minimum °F (°C)	34.0 (1.1)	36.4 (2.4)	39.4 (4.1)	43.1 (6.2)	48.0 (8.9)	52.5 (11.4)	58.0 (14.4)	57.6 (14.2)	54.1 (12.3)	47.1 (8.4)	39.0 (3.9)	33.4 (0.8)	31.7 (−0.2)
Record low °F (°C)	13 (−11)	20 (−7)	20 (−7)	24 (−4)	30 (−1)	35 (2)	38 (3)	36 (2)	32 (0)	25 (−4)	20 (−7)	15 (−9)	13 (−11)
Average precipitation inches (mm)	3.19 (81)	3.57 (91)	2.20 (56)	0.99 (25)	0.35 (8.9)	0.09 (2.3)	0.12 (3.0)	0.06 (1.5)	0.16 (4.1)	0.57 (14)	1.08 (27)	2.14 (54)	14.52 (369)
Average precipitation days (≥ 0.01 in)	6.4	6.9	5.8	4.0	2.6	0.9	0.7	0.4	1.0	2.3	3.7	6.3	41
Source: NOAA

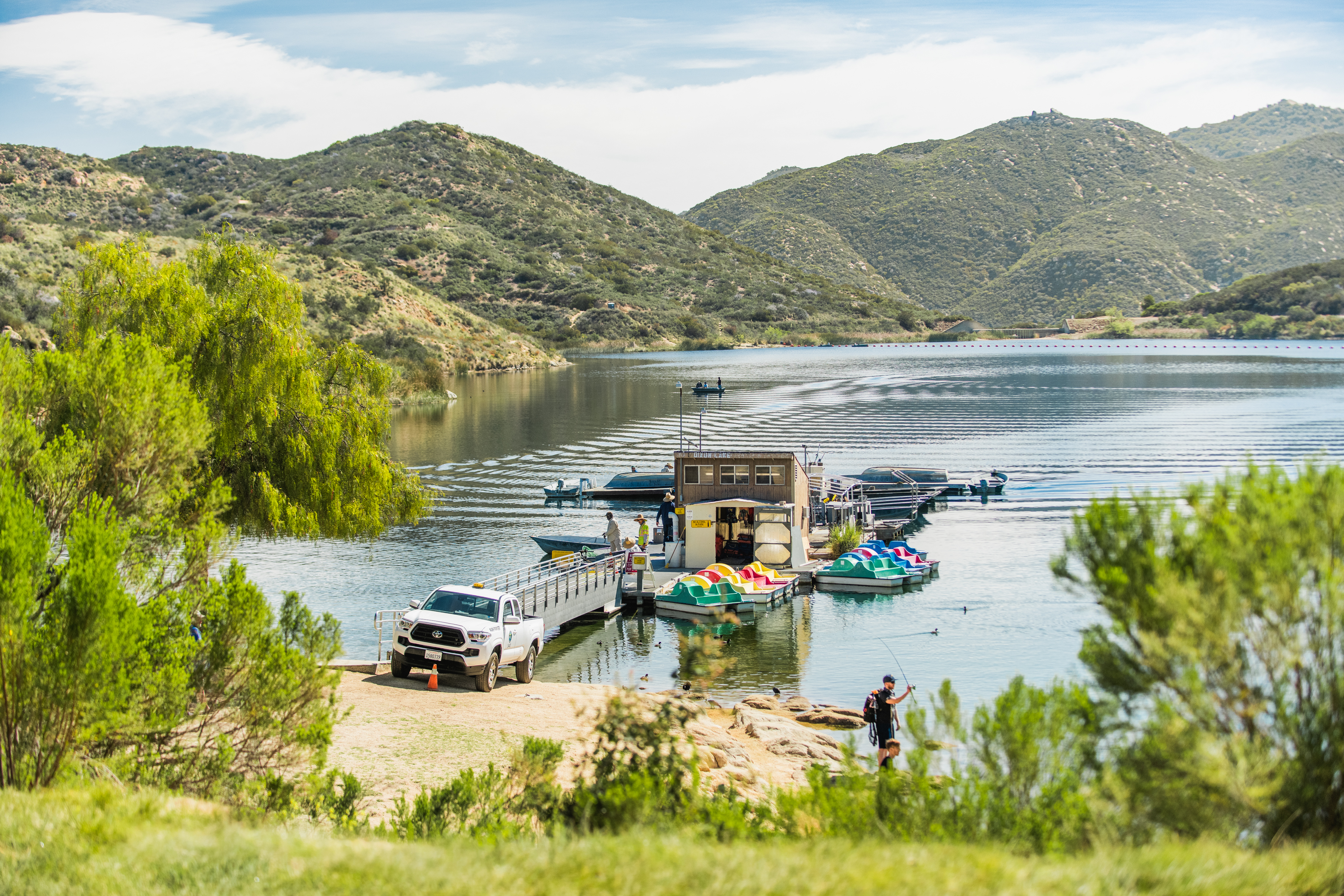
Boating activities at Dixon Lake

=== Dixon Lake ===
Dixon Lake is located in the north of Escondido. Dixon Lake has been granted an Aquaculture Permit by the State of California Department of Fish and Wildlife, so that fishing licenses are no longer required. However, all anglers eight years and older will need daily lake fishing permits, which are available at the concession stand. Throughout the year, the city keeps stocking different types of fish, which include bass, bluegill, carp, catfish, crappie, and trout. Each year the Trout Derby event is also hosted at Dixon Lake.

== Demographics ==
Historical population
Census	Pop.	Note	%±
1890	541		—
1900	755		39.6%
1930	3,421		—
1940	4,560		33.3%
1950	6,544		43.5%
1960	16,377		150.3%
1970	36,792		124.7%
1980	64,355		74.9%
1990	108,635		68.8%
2000	133,559		22.9%
2010	143,911		7.8%
2020	151,038		5.0%
2025 (est.)	150,425	▼	−0.4%
U.S. Decennial Census; 1860–1870 1880-1890; 1900 1910 1920; 1930 1940 1950; 1960 1970 1980; 1990 2000 2010; 2020

Escondido city, California – Racial and ethnic composition Note: the US Census treats Hispanic/Latino as an ethnic category. This table excludes Latinos from the racial categories and assigns them to a separate category. Hispanics/Latinos may be of any race.
Race / Ethnicity (NH = Non-Hispanic)	Pop 2000	Pop 2010	Pop 2020	% 2000	% 2010	% 2020
White alone (NH)	69,305	58,142	50,693	51.89%	40.40%	33.56%
Black or African American alone (NH)	2,734	3,046	3,267	2.05%	2.12%	2.16%
Native American or Alaska Native alone (NH)	776	577	479	0.58%	0.40%	0.32%
Asian alone (NH)	5,812	8,491	11,650	4.35%	5.90%	7.71%
Native Hawaiian or Pacific Islander alone (NH)	251	306	325	0.19%	0.21%	0.22%
Other Race alone (NH)	184	201	664	0.14%	0.14%	0.44%
Mixed race or Multiracial (NH)	2,804	2,822	5,734	2.10%	1.96%	3.80%
Hispanic or Latino (any race)	51,693	70,326	78,226	38.70%	48.87%	51.79%
Total	133,559	143,911	151,038	100.00%	100.00%	100.00%

=== 2020 census ===
The 2020 United States census reported that Escondido had a population of 151,038. The population density was 4,044.4 inhabitants per square mile (1,561.6/km^{2}). The racial makeup was 41.9% White, 2.4% African American, 1.8% Native American, 7.9% Asian, 0.3% Pacific Islander, 29.0% from other races, and 16.7% from two or more races. Hispanic or Latino of any race were 51.8% of the population.

The census reported that 98.6% of the population lived in households, 0.9% lived in non-institutionalized group quarters, and 0.5% were institutionalized.

There were 48,316 households, out of which 38.0% included children under the age of 18, 51.0% were married-couple households, 7.5% were cohabiting couple households, 25.6% had a female householder with no partner present, and 15.8% had a male householder with no partner present. 19.0% of households were one person, and 9.4% were one person aged 65 or older. The average household size was 3.08. There were 35,642 families (73.8% of all households).

The age distribution was 24.1% under the age of 18, 10.0% aged 18 to 24, 28.0% aged 25 to 44, 24.1% aged 45 to 64, and 13.9% who were 65 years of age or older. The median age was 35.7 years. For every 100 females, there were 97.0 males.

There were 49,998 housing units at an average density of 1,338.8 units per square mile (516.9 units/km^{2}), of which 48,316 (96.6%) were occupied. Of these, 51.7% were owner-occupied, and 48.3% were occupied by renters.

In 2023, the US Census Bureau estimated that the median household income was $84,477, and the per capita income was $38,098. About 9.9% of families and 13.4% of the population were below the poverty line.

=== 2010 census ===
In the 2010 United States census, Escondido had a population of 143,911. The population density was 3,890.7 inhabitants per square mile (1,502.2/km^{2}). The racial makeup was 60.4% White (Non-Hispanic White 40.4%), 2.5% African American (2.1% Non-Hispanic black), 1.0% Native American, 6.1% Asian, 0.2% Pacific Islander, 25.4% from other races, and 4.4% from two or more races. Hispanic or Latino of any race were 48.9% of the population.

The Census reported that 141,792 people (98.5% of the population) lived in households, 1,333 (0.9%) lived in non-institutionalized group quarters, and 786 (0.5%) were institutionalized.

There were 45,484 households, out of which 18,989 (41.7%) had children under the age of 18 living in them, 23,535 (51.7%) were opposite-sex married couples living together, 6,082 (13.4%) had a female householder with no husband present, 3,115 (6.8%) had a male householder with no wife present. There were 3,121 (6.9%) unmarried opposite-sex partnerships, and 343 (0.8%) same-sex married couples or partnerships. 9,528 households (20.9%) were made up of individuals, and 4,235 (9.3%) had someone living alone who was 65 years of age or older. The average household size was 3.12. There were 32,732 families (72.0% of all households); the average family size was 3.57.

The age distribution of the population showed 39,778 people (27.6%) under the age of 18, 15,455 people (10.7%) aged 18 to 24, 41,043 people (28.5%) aged 25 to 44, 32,551 people (22.6%) aged 45 to 64, and 15,084 people (10.5%) who were 65 years of age or older. The median age was 32.5 years. For every 100 females, there were 98.2 males. For every 100 females age 18 and over, there were 96.1 males.

There were 48,044 housing units at an average density of 1,298.9 per square mile (501.5/km^{2}), of which 23,759 (52.2%) were owner-occupied, and 21,725 (47.8%) were occupied by renters. The homeowner vacancy rate was 2.2%; the rental vacancy rate was 6.0%. 70,936 people (49.3% of the population) lived in owner-occupied housing units and 70,856 people (49.2%) lived in rental housing units.

The city can be divided into two demographically distinct areas. Peripheral hilly areas to the north, southeast, and southwest are relatively wealthy and populated by non-Hispanic whites, and flat areas adjacent to the downtown are predominantly Hispanic. As of 2006–07 school year, non-Hispanic white children comprised 71.7% of all students in Bernardo Elementary School (southwest), 60.8% of all students in L.R. Green Elementary School (southeast), and 54.7% of all students in Reidy Creek Elementary School (north); In contrast, Farr Avenue, Pioneer and Lincoln Elementary schools (three large schools just north of the downtown) all have more than 85% of Hispanic and less than 6% non-Hispanic white students.

=== Crime ===
Escondido ranks in the top 5 neighborhoods of San Diego County with the highest crime rate as of 2022. Escondido's crime rate is considerably higher than the national average. Escondido's Crime Rate is 72% higher than the national average. The chance of being the victim of a crime in Escondido in 1 in 14. Escondido crime rates rank similar to El Cajon, National City, Oceanside, Lemon Grove, Barrio Logan, Logan Heights, and Santa Ana. The most dangerous neighborhoods in Escondido are Harmony Grove, Vineyard, Midway, Central Escondido, and South Boulevard. The safest neighborhoods in Escondido are Felicita, East Valley, Kit Carson, and East Canyon.

=== Economy ===
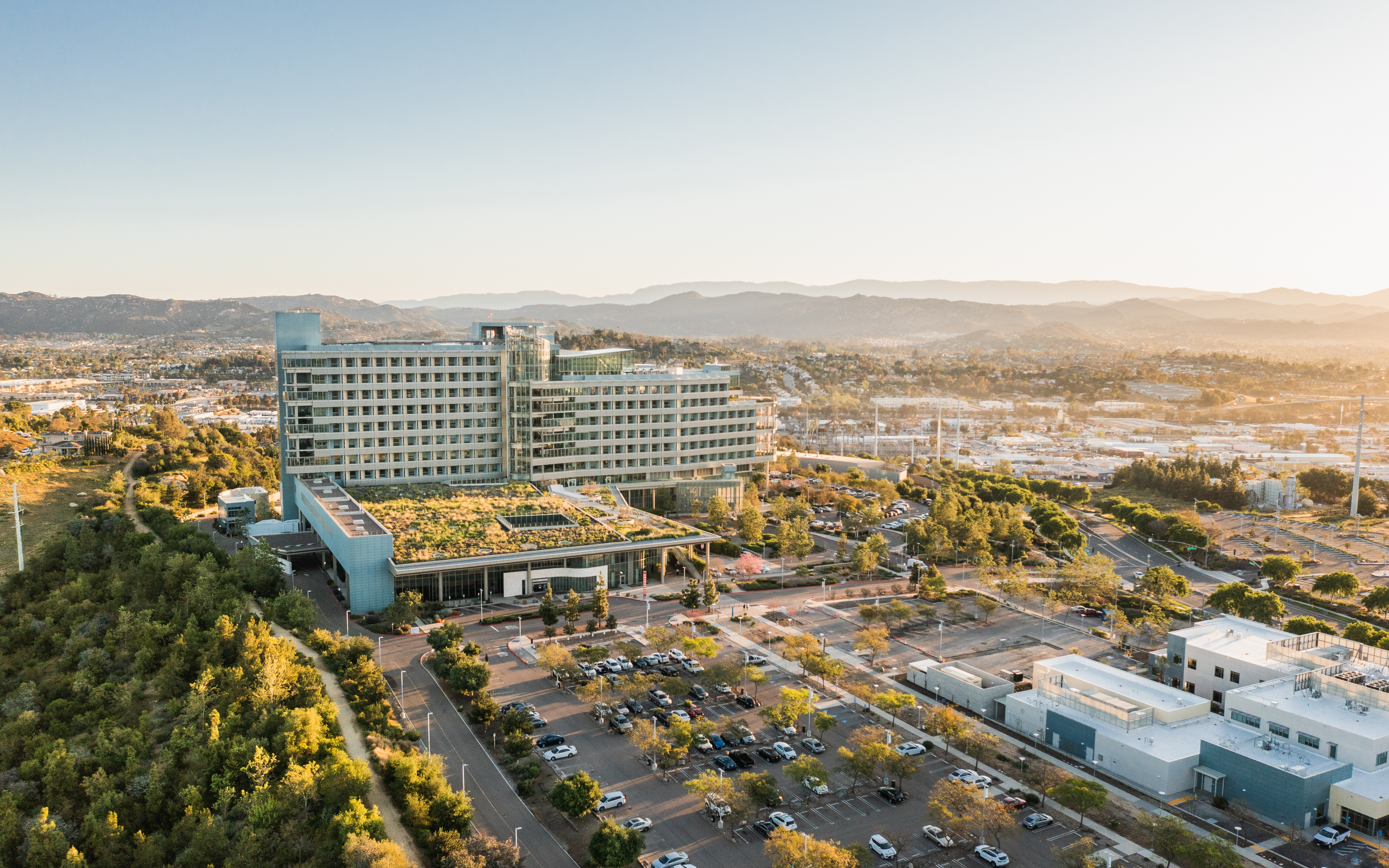
Aerial view of Palomar Medical Center in Escondido

Residents work in a range of industries. Out of the approximately 64,000 employed civilian residents over the age of 16, 15% work in educational, health care and social services; 13% in retail trade; 13% in construction; 12% in professional, scientific, management, administrative, and waste management services; 11% in arts, entertainment, recreation, and accommodation and food services; 11% in manufacturing; and 11% in other services.

=== Top employers ===
According to the city's 2023 Comprehensive Annual Financial Report, the top employers in the city are:

#	Employer	# of Employees
1	Palomar Medical Center	2,906
2	Escondido Union School District	2,077
3	City of Escondido	959
4	Escondido Union High School District	881
5	Toyota of Escondido	368
6	Bergelectric	354
7	The Home Depot	332
8	Vons	266
9	The Classical Academies	225
10	Ne-Mo's Bakery	216

In 2006, Stone Brewing Co. moved its headquarters and brewery from San Marcos, California to a new, much larger facility in the Quail Hills area of Escondido. Dr. Bronner's Magic Soaps is also located in the city.

=== Shopping ===
- The Farmers Market in downtown Escondido is a certified Farmers Market that showcases fresh-picked California-grown fruits, vegetables, and flowers.
- The Escondido Swap Market has operated over 40 years, and features used and new merchandise and food.
- Westfield North County, which opened in 1986, is an indoor shopping mall on Via Rancho Parkway in southern Escondido. It features JCPenney, Macy's, and Target.

== Arts and culture ==
=== Downtown ===
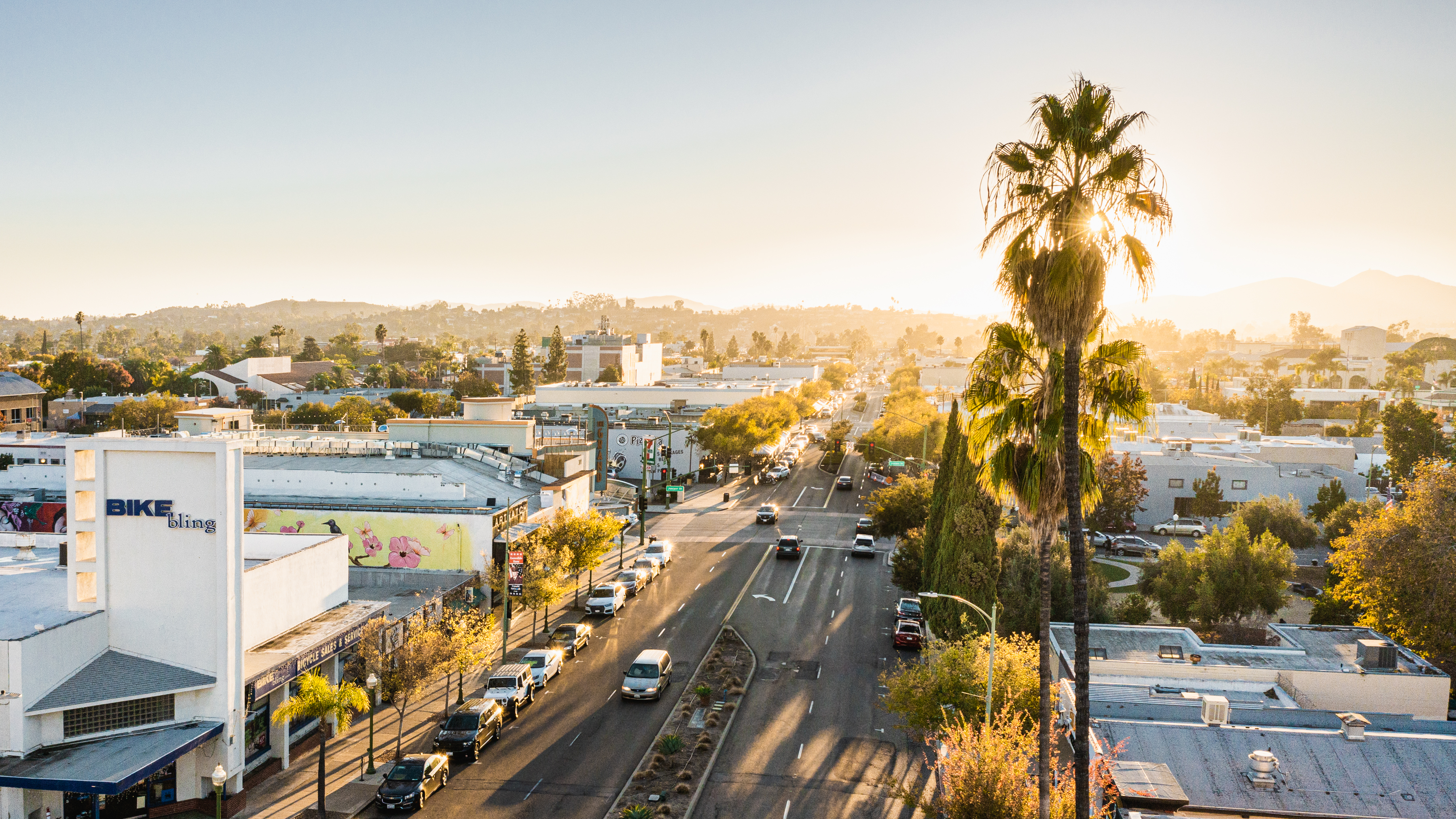
Historic Downtown Escondido

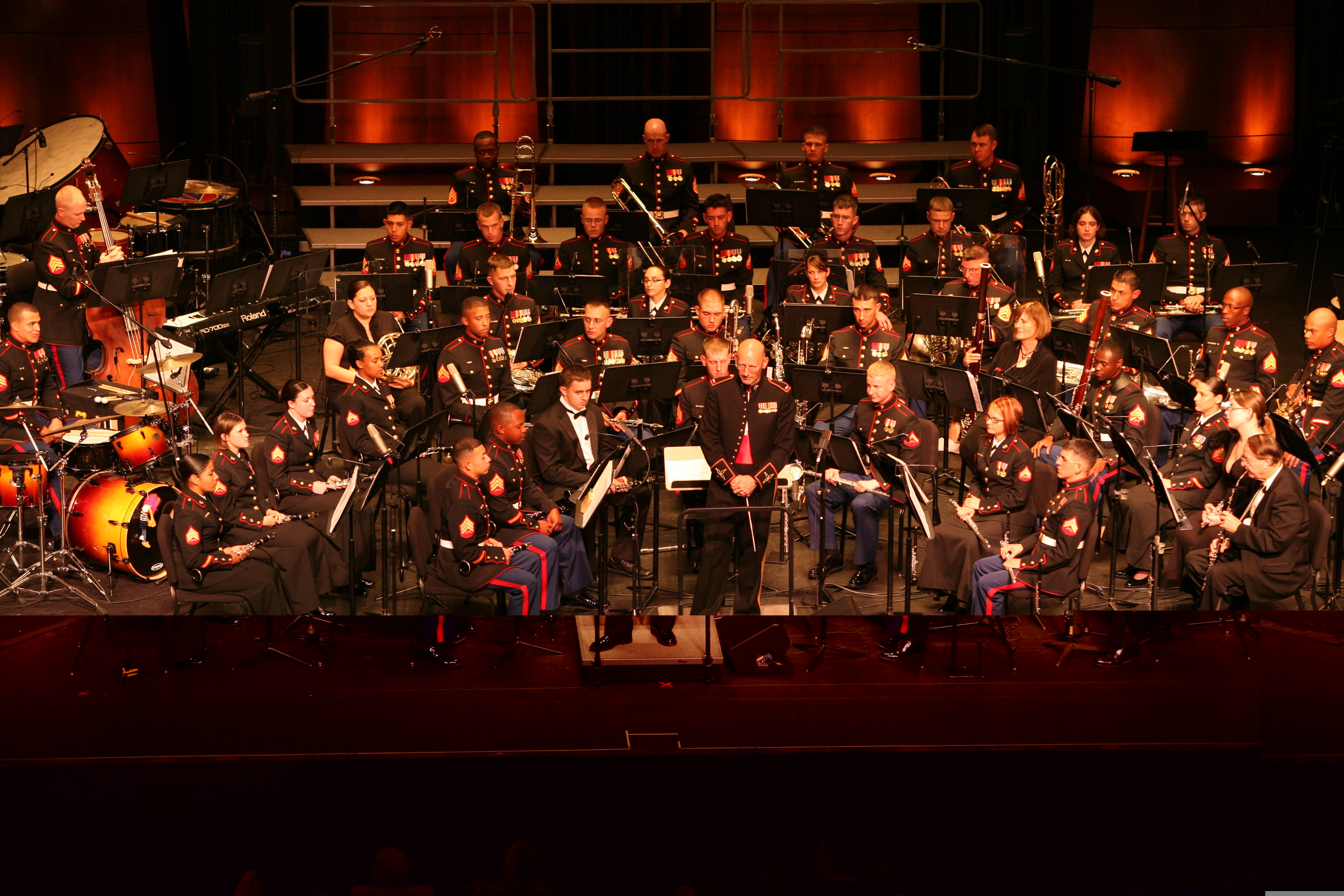
The 1st Marine Division Band performing at the Escondido Arts Center

Downtown has become more active in the past few years with the opening of restaurants, cafes, and galleries. A satellite location of the Mingei International Museum, a well-known museum of folk art from around the world, occupied the former J.C. Penney building on Grand Avenue from 2003 to 2010. One block off Grand Ave. is Grape Day Park with the civic center and the California Center for the Arts, which features two theaters, a visual arts museum, an educational complex, and a conference center. Grape Day Park also hosts the Escondido History Center, an independent non-profit museum. San Diego Children's Discovery Museum, across the street on N Broadway, features hands-on exhibits and programs for children up to 10 years of age, with an authentically regional perspective on natural and social science. The History Center features the city's original Santa Fe Depot, first library, Victorian house, barn, and blacksmith shop. The Pioneer Room of Escondido Public Library (located in the Mathes Center building next to the Main Library) offers photographs, maps, oral histories, genealogical collections, directories and yearbooks documenting Escondido's history. On Friday evenings a car rally called Cruisin' Grand takes place on seven blocks of Grand Avenue, featuring pre-1970 vintage cars every year from April to September.

The Escondido Arts Partnership, a non-profit art organization established in 1995, created and hosts the Second Saturday Art Walk, involving several galleries and museums in Escondido. It also has a Municipal Gallery including five galleries and five art study spaces. It operates the Betty Woodaman Memorial Art Library, a donated-based art library that offers art books local community, and publishes an annual collection of poetry and art called "Summation".

== Sports ==
From 1964 to 1968, the San Diego Chargers held training camp in Escondido.

In 1981, Escondido National Little League became the 19th team to make it to the Little League World Series from the state of California. The team was first District 31 champions, then District 8 champions. They then won the Southern California Divisional Tournament at Youth Athletic Park by beating San Bernardino Civitan 3–2 in the quarterfinals, then beating Granada Hills American 5–1 in the semifinals and then beating Ladera National 7–5 in the finals to earn a trip to the Western Regional. At the Western Regional in San Bernardino, the Escondido team won four straight games to earn the trip to Williamsport.

In October 2010, Merritt Paulson, owner of the AAA Portland Beavers franchise, announced that the team was being sold to the North County Baseball ownership group, led by Jeff Moorad, part-owner and CEO of the Beavers parent team, the San Diego Padres. The ownership group discussed building a stadium in Escondido to become operational for the 2012 baseball season at the earliest. In December 2010, the Escondido city council voted to go ahead with the ballpark. The stadium was slated to open in April 2013. However, the plan to move the team fell through in late 2011.

The San Diego Sabers of the United States Premier Hockey League played at Ice-Plex in Escondido until relocating to Carlsbad Icetown in 2020.

In 2019, San Diego Rebellion of the Women's National Football Conference was established, playing in Escondido High School.

== Parks and recreation ==
=== Parks ===
Escondido has fifteen parks:

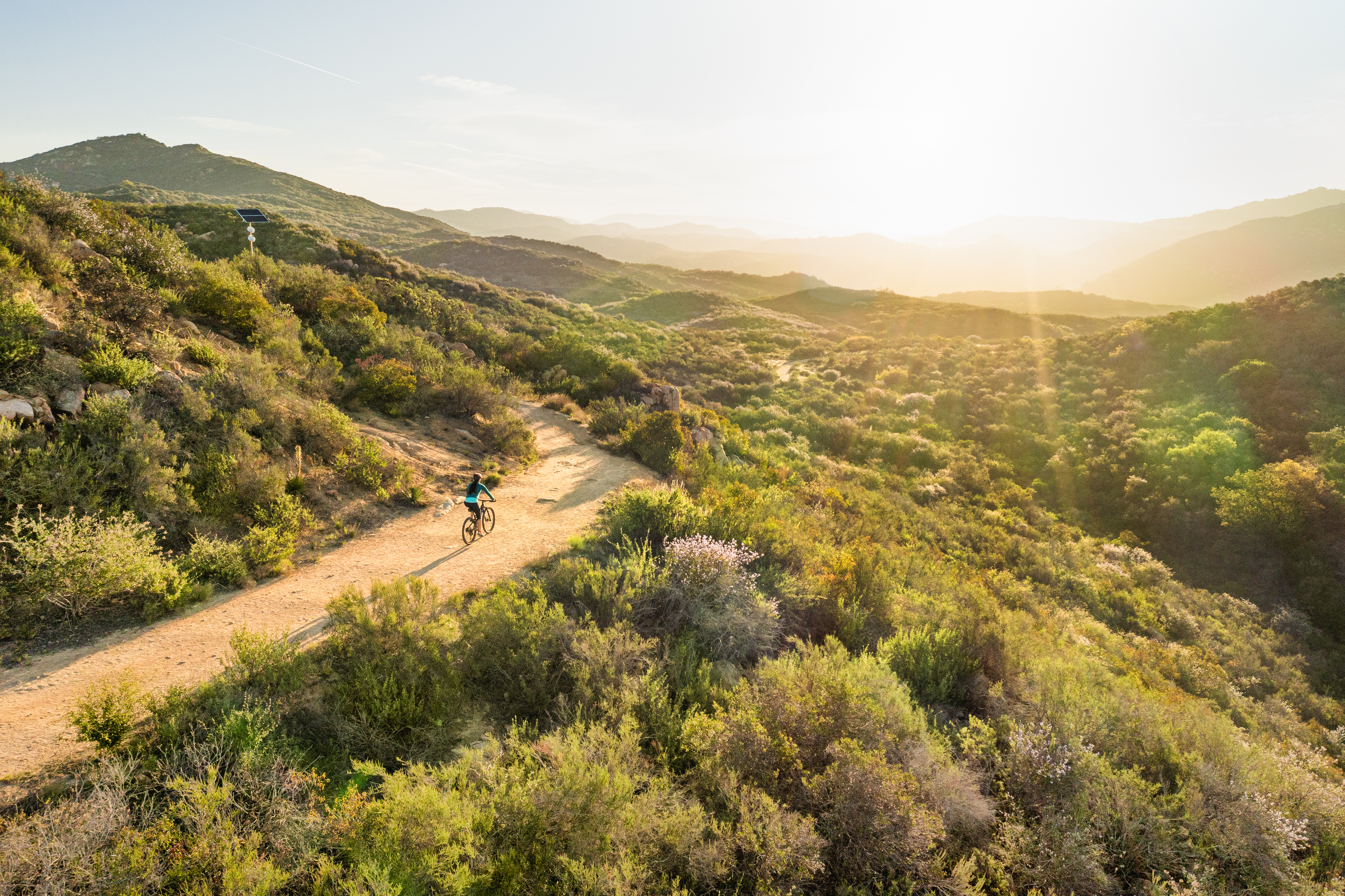
- Aerial view of a mountain biker on Sage Trail in Daley Ranch
  Daley Ranch is a 3,058-acre (12.38 km^{2}) conservation area acquired in 1996 by the City of Escondido and is managed in perpetuity for the preservation of a biologically unique and diverse habitat area of regional importance. Daley Ranch has over 20 miles (32 km) of hiking, mountain biking, and equestrian trails. Six distinct trails cover most of the property. Most popular are the Boulder Loop Trail (2.4 miles) which affords views of Escondido, and the Ranch House Loop (2.5 miles), which passes two small ponds and the site of Daley's original log cabin. Several species of oak trees are common, as well as chaparral (brushland). Wildlife include deer, coyote, bobcats, rabbits and hawks. Cougars are sometimes present, but not frequently seen.
- El Norte Park is a small "green lung" park, off El Norte Parkway in northern Escondido. It features mature trees and a kids playground.

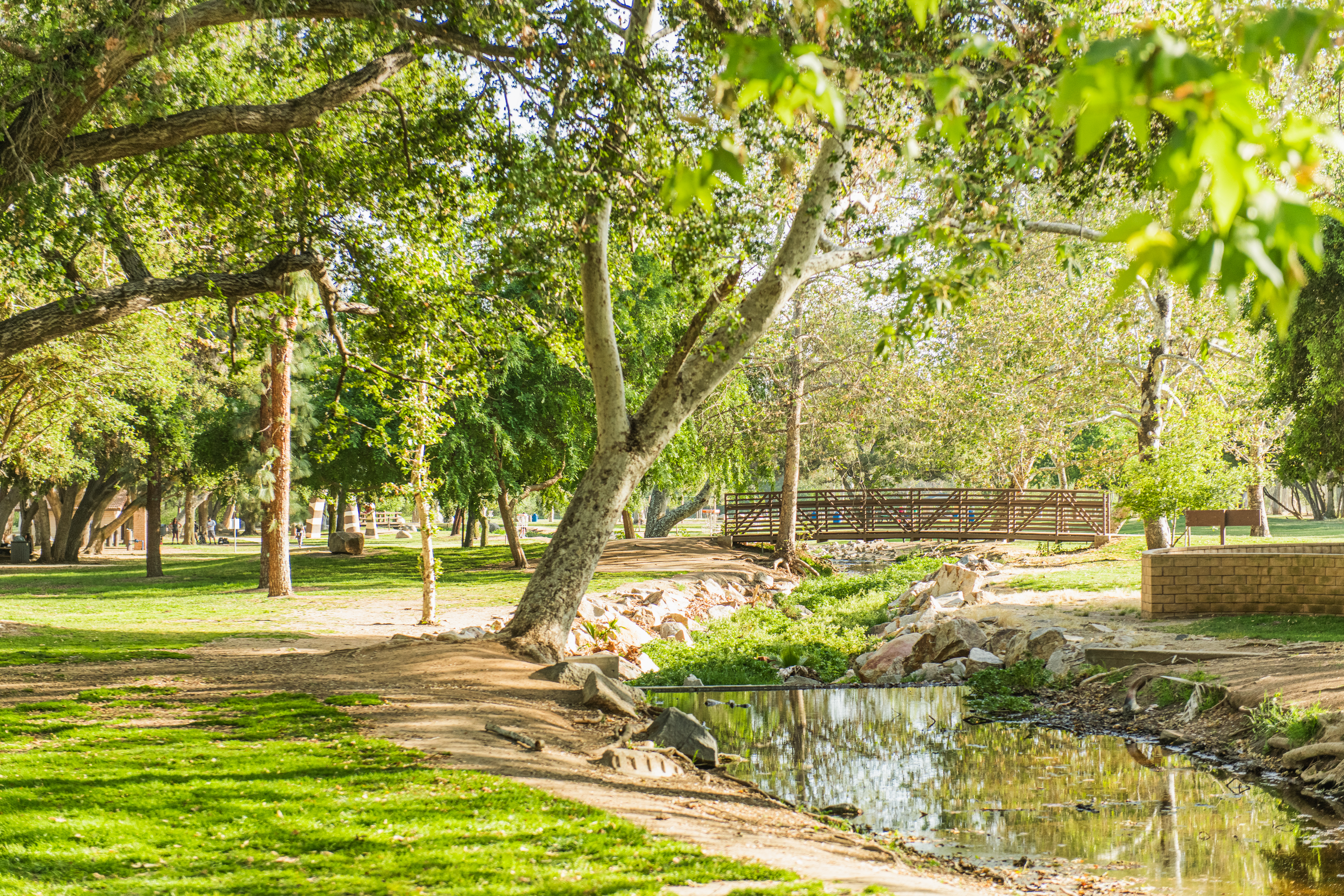
A portion of the disc golf course at Kit Carson Park

- Kit Carson Park is a 285-acre (1.15 km^{2}) municipal park featuring 3 ponds, multiple sports fields, playgrounds, a disc golf course, an arboretum, and Queen Califia's Magical Circle, the last major international work by French artist Niki de Saint Phalle. De Saint Phalle, a colleague of Salvador Dalí and Jasper Johns, is best known for her Stravinsky Fountain, located in Paris, France. The artist chose Escondido as the site for her final work because it reminded her of Italy.
- Grape Day Park is located behind the Escondido City Hall and the performing arts complex. This park was named after the annual grape day harvest, an event held on the first Saturday after Labor Day from 1908 to 1950.
- Jesmond Dene Park in North Escondido features 3 ball fields, a playground, and BBQs.

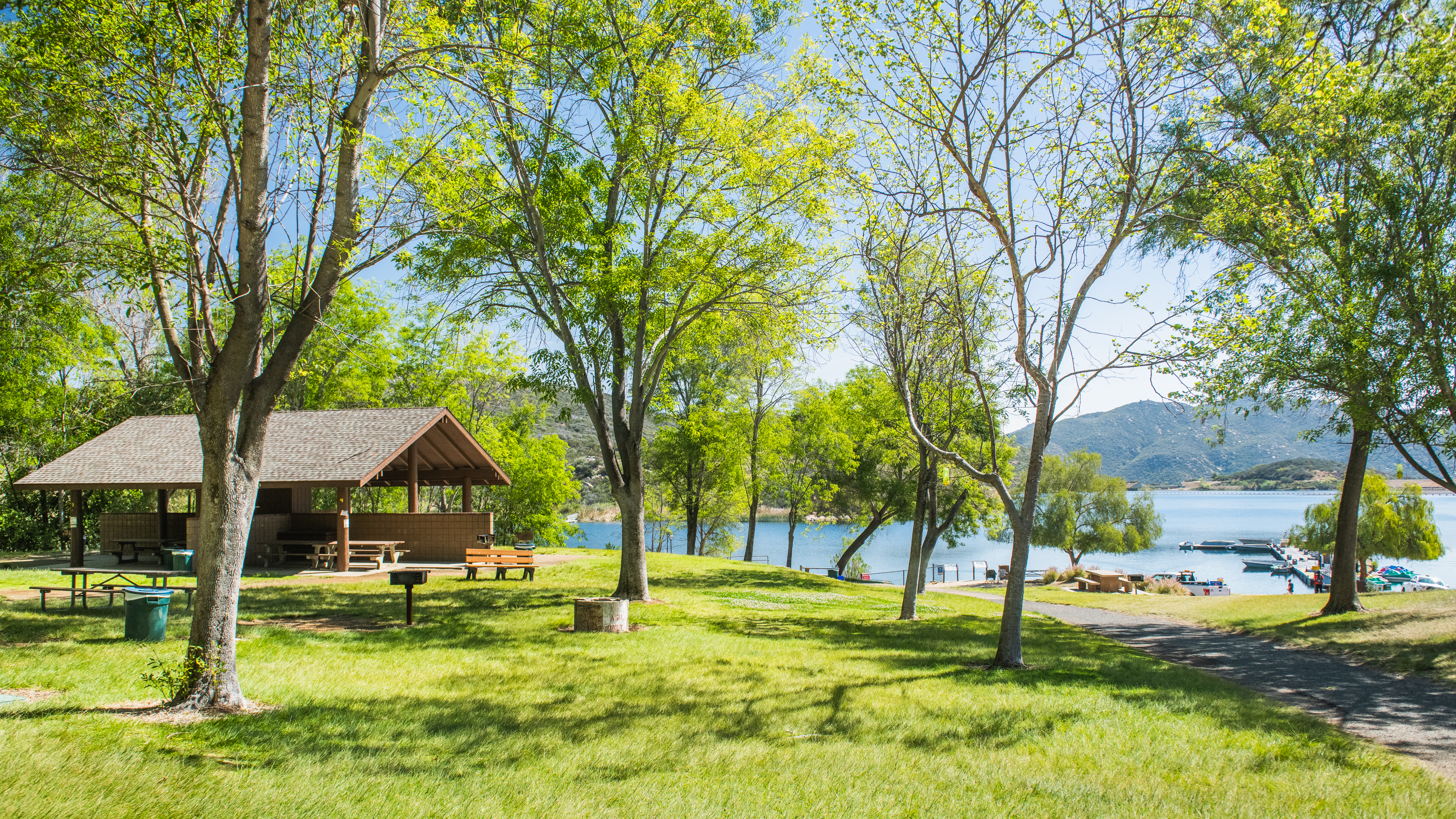
Picnic areas at Dixon Lake

- Dixon Lake supplies Escondido with fresh water and is a popular location for fishing, as fishing permits can be purchased at the store on site. Swimming is not allowed but rowboats, motorized boats, and pedal boats are available for rental. Dixon Lake has about 34 campsites which look out over the lake and/or over Escondido. There are several trails that follow the shoreline of Dixon Lake, as well as several fishing areas and floating docks on both sides of the lake. While entrance to the park is free, the city charges $5.00 on Saturdays and Sundays for taking a car into the park. However, ample free parking next to the trailheads of Daley Ranch is available outside the Dixon Lake gate.
- Lake Wohlford is in the northeast corner of Escondido. The lake has some walking trails around the perimeter and allows fishing. In addition, the northern shore is home to the Lake Wohlford Cafe, founded in 1949 and prominently featuring locally caught catfish in its menus.
- Mountain View
- Rod McLeod Park is an 18-acre (73,000 m^{2}) green space offering a tot lot, a paved trail, restrooms, benches, picnic tables, and BBQs.
- Washington Park is an urban park located on the eastern side of central Escondido. It features lighted facilities for baseball, softball, tennis and basketball, a 25-yard swimming pool and water slide, and a smaller children's pool. The park's numerous mature trees create plenty of shady areas and tables are provided for picnics.
- Westside
- Frances Ryan Park is a 67-acre (270,000 m^{2}) complex of soccer fields, supported by a concession stand and public restrooms. The park is adjacent to Valley High School in eastern Escondido at the corner of Valley Parkway and El Norte Parkway. As of October 2010, the park features 7 soccer fields, 5 of which have lights for night time practice and play. The park is named for a former teacher at Escondido High School.
- Grove Park was so named to recognize the city's agricultural history. It was built about 2008 (approximate date). It is about 4.5 acres (18,000 m^{2}) in size and is located in the Mission Park neighborhood.
- Felicita County Park

=== San Diego Zoo Safari Park ===
The San Diego Zoo Safari Park is located near Escondido, in the San Pasqual Valley within the city limits of San Diego. It is the sister park to the San Diego Zoo. The Safari Park shows animals in open habitats.

== Government ==
=== Local ===
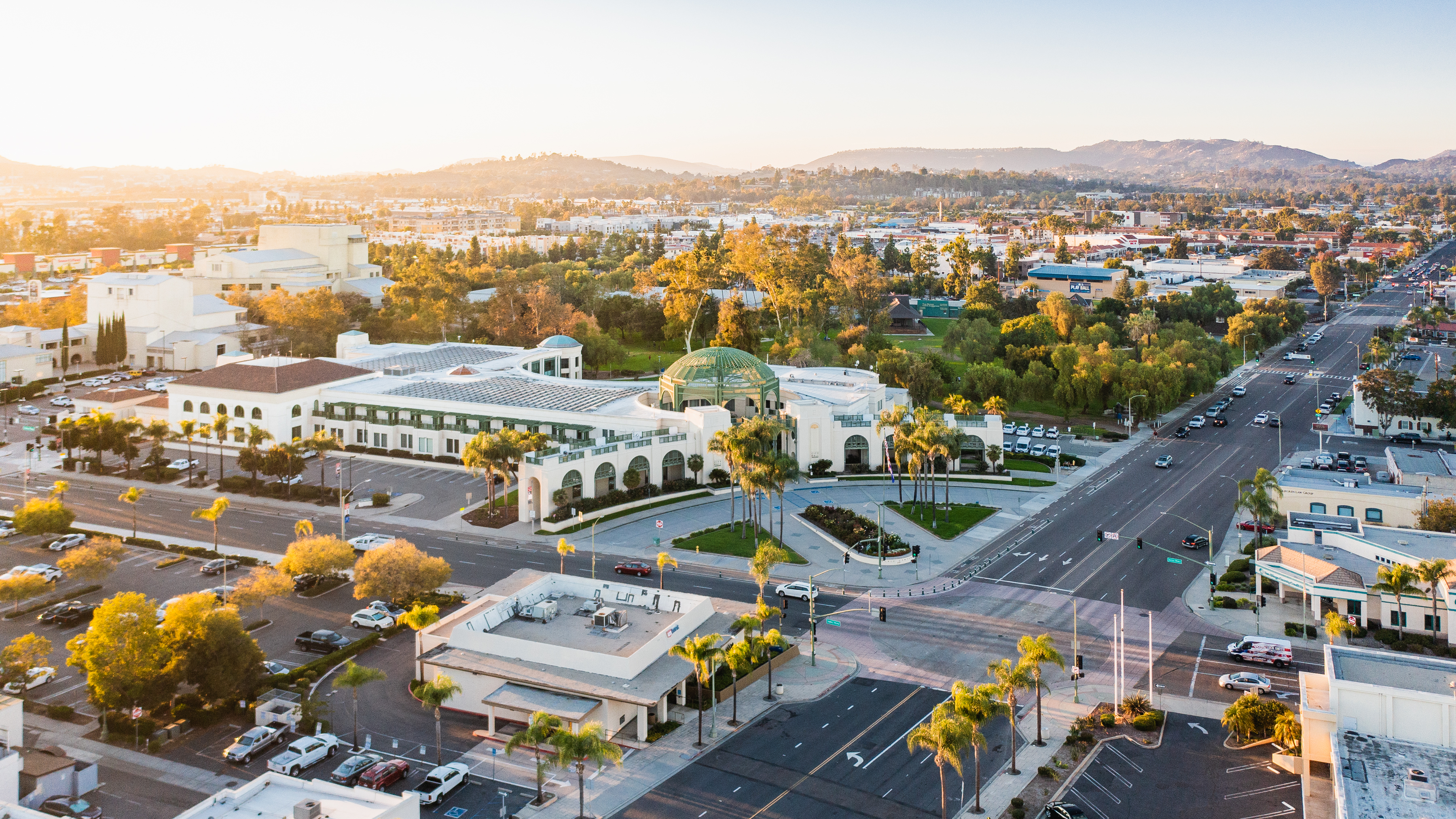
Aerial view of Escondido City Hall and Grape Day Park behind

Escondido is governed by a council-manager system. The city council consists of a mayor and four City Council members. Along with the City Treasurer, they are elected at large to four-year terms. The current mayor is Dane White. Current City Council members are Consuelo Martinez, Jose M. Garcia, and Michael Morasco. The current City Manager is Sean McGlynn. The current City Treasurer is Douglas Shultz. The most recent election was held on November 8, 2022.

The city is particularly known for its positions on illegal immigration. Approximately half of the population is Hispanic, and then-council member Sam Abed estimated in 2006 that 35,000 people, or 25% of the city population, are undocumented. Since 2010 federal immigration officials have worked out of the Escondido police station in an unprecedented city-federal partnership. In 2006 the city council proposed and then abandoned an ordinance to punish landlords who rent to illegal immigrants. Due to a public outcry and legal challenges to that proposed housing ordinance, as well as the election of Diaz to the City Council, the council has ceased any overt measures against illegal immigrants. Council policies now focus on "quality of life" issues instead. Periodic police checkpoints are set up which randomly stop drivers to check drivers licenses, registration, and insurance. An overnight parking ordinance has been proposed that would limit the number of cars each household can legally park on city streets. The city is estimated to have lost as much as a quarter of its non-citizen population between 2006 and 2007; Latino activists attribute this to a perception of the city as hostile to immigrants.

The City of Escondido is a member of the San Diego Association of Governments (SANDAG).

=== State and federal representation ===
In the California State Legislature, Escondido is in the 40th senatorial district, represented by Republican Brian Jones, and in the 76th Assembly district, represented by Democrat Darshana Patel.

In the United States House of Representatives, parts of Escondido are in California's 50th congressional district, represented by Democrat Scott Peters, while others are in California's 48th congressional district, represented by Republican Darrell Issa.

== Politics ==
In the United States presidential election of 2008, 53.3% of voters residing in incorporated Escondido voted for John McCain, 44.9% for Barack Obama, and 1.8% for a third-party candidate. Unincorporated areas were considerably more conservative: among voters in neighborhoods of Rincon Del Diablo, Hidden Meadows, and Valley Center, 62.3%, 65.5%, 66.9% of voters respectively cast their votes for McCain. A survey by The Bay Area Center for Voting Research found that among American cities with populations over 100,000, Escondido was the 11th most conservative city in the United States based on voting results in the 2004 presidential election.

== Education ==
The vast majority of Escondido is within the Escondido Union Elementary School District and Escondido Union High School District. Some portions are within the San Pasqual Union Elementary School District and the Escondido Union HSD. There are portions that extend into the San Marcos Unified School District and into the Valley Center-Pauma Unified School District.

The Escondido Union ESD, San Pasqual Union ESD, and Escondido Union HSD serve the City of Escondido and the Unincorporated communities such as: Jesmond Dene, North Ridge, Hidden Meadows, Deer Springs, San Pasqual Valley, Del Dios, Elfin Forrest, East Canyon, Cloverdale, and Lake Wolford. The city has 19 elementary, seven middle, and seven high schools.

Escondido Adult School was established in 1968 by the Escondido Union High School District. Escondido Adult School is a provider of adult education services in Escondido and its surrounding communities. Escondido Adult School offers adult education services for adults in the areas of: high school diploma, GED, HISET, adult basic education, ESL, parenting classes, community education courses, and career technical education courses. Escondido Adult School also offers a robust selection of short-term medical training courses such as: Certified Nurse Assistant, Certified Home Health Aide, Medical Assistant, Pharmacy Technician, Phlebotomy, Medical Billing and Coding, CPR/BLS training and certification, and Veterinary Assistant. Escondido Adult School is a member of the Education to Career Network of North San Diego County. ETCN is one of 71 consortiums in the State of California and is funded by the California Adult Education Program.

Public Post-Secondary schools: Escondido Adult School and Palomar College-Escondido Campus

Public high schools:

- Escondido High School
- Orange Glen High School
- San Pasqual High School
- Classical Academy High School
- Escondido Charter High School
- Valley High School
- Del Lago Academy: Campus of Applied Science
- Balboa School

Middle schools:

- Classical Academy Middle School
- Bear Valley Middle School
- Del Dios Middle School
- Heritage Junior High School
- Hidden Valley Middle School
- Mission Middle School
- Rincon Middle School
- Quantum Academy Middle School
- Limitless Learning Academy

Elementary schools

- Bernardo Elementary
- Central Elementary
- Classical Academy
- Coastal Academy
- Conway Elementary
- Farr Avenue Elementary
- Felicita Elementary
- Glen View Elementary
- Heritage Elementary
- Juniper Elementary
- L. R. Green Elementary
- Lincoln Elementary
- Miller Elementary
- North Broadway Elementary
- Oak Hill Elementary
- Orange Glen Elementary
- Pioneer Elementary
- Reidy Creek Elementary
- Rock Springs Elementary
- Rose Elementary

There is a wide range of API scores for Escondido schools, reflecting the demographic diversity of the city. As of 2009, two elementary schools in the district scored above the 80th percentile of all schools in the state, and nine elementary schools scored below the 20th percentile.

The Escondido Public Library system consists of the Main Branch, the Pioneer Room, Computer Center, and a bookmobile.

Westminster Seminary California is located in Escondido. In 2013 John Paul the Great Catholic University relocated its main campus to Escondido.

== Infrastructure ==
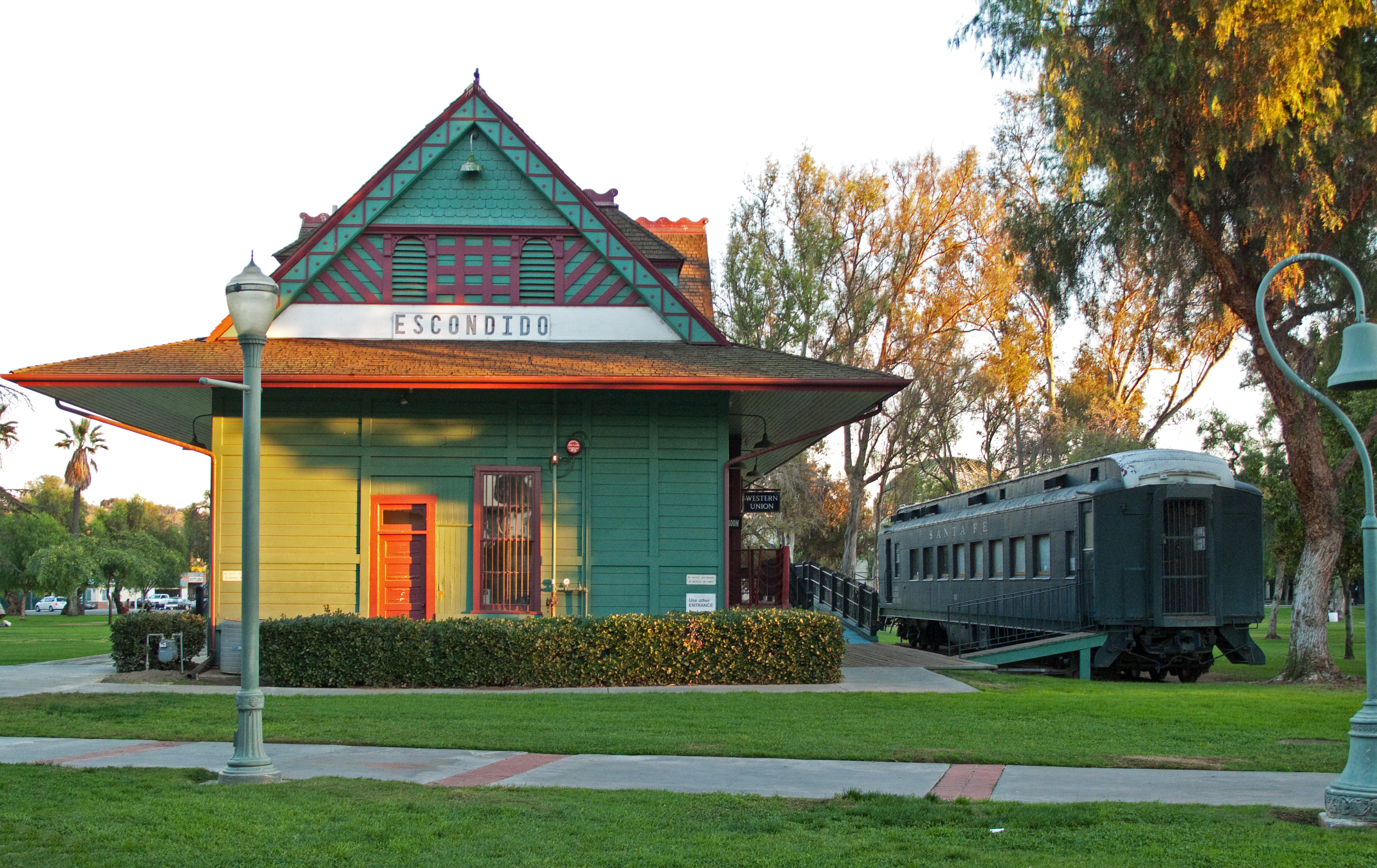
Historic railroad station

=== Transportation ===
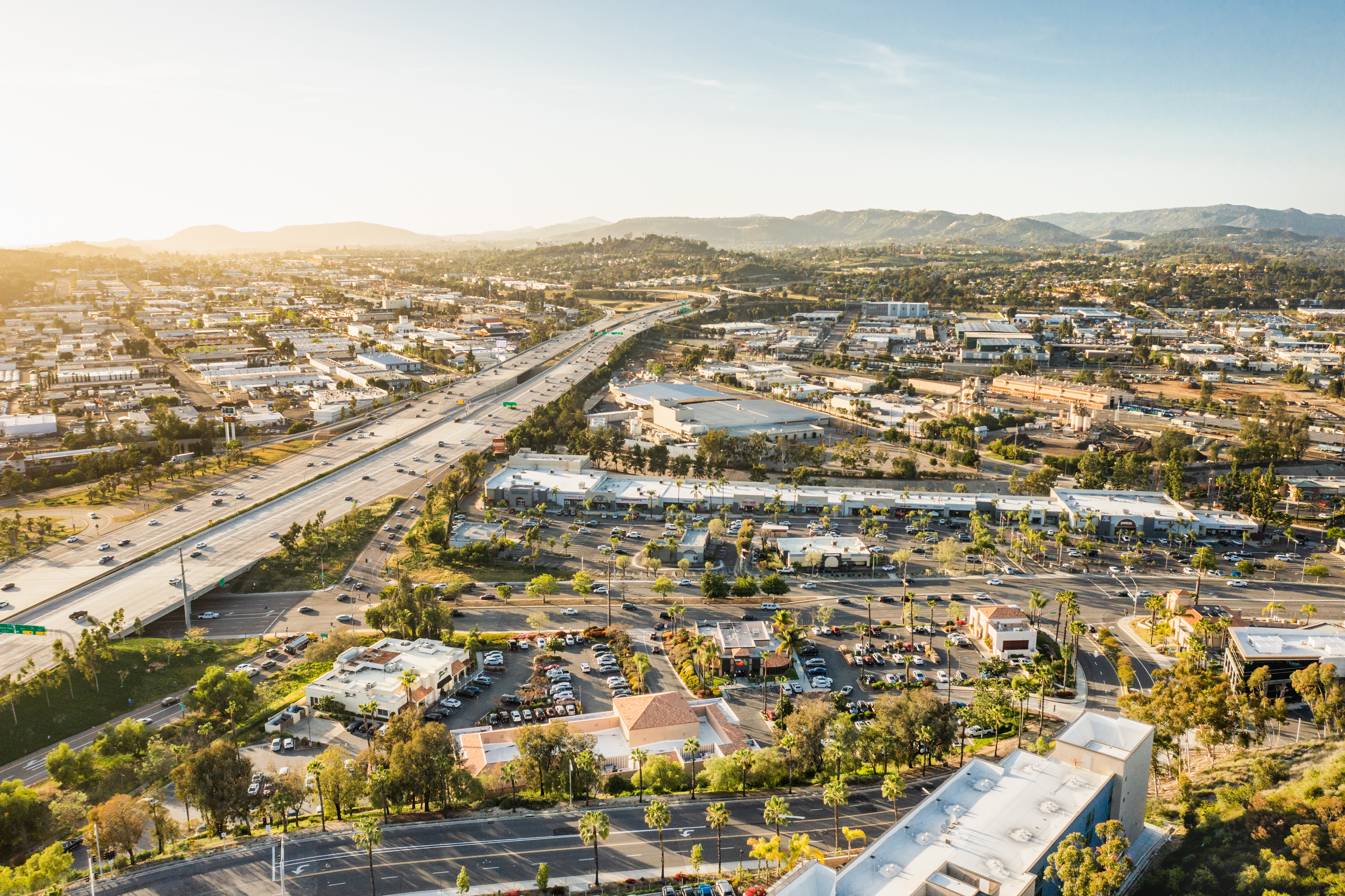
An aerial view of Interstate 15 approaching the Route 78 interchange in Escondido

Two highways serve Escondido: Route 78 and Interstate 15. Route 78 enters from the west as a freeway from Oceanside, which ends at Broadway. The highway follows surface streets and leaves the city heading east into the San Pasqual Valley. I-15 continues from the city to Temecula in the north and San Diego in the south.

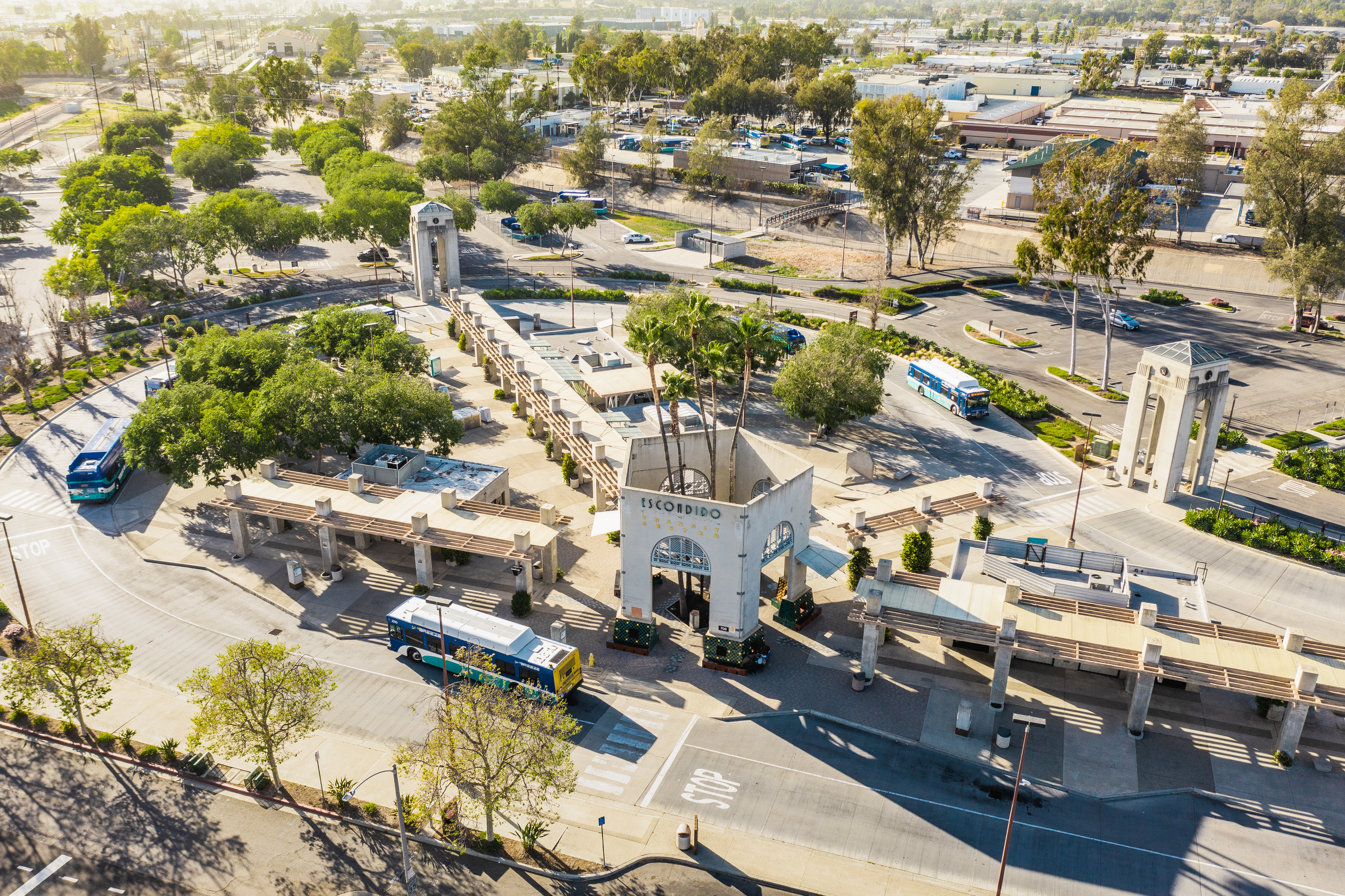
Escondido city buses entering and departing the Escondido Transit Center

The North County Transit District (NCTD) operates local bus service, with the Escondido Transit Center serving as a hub. The transit center has connections to both the San Diego Metropolitan Transit System and the Riverside Transit Agency.

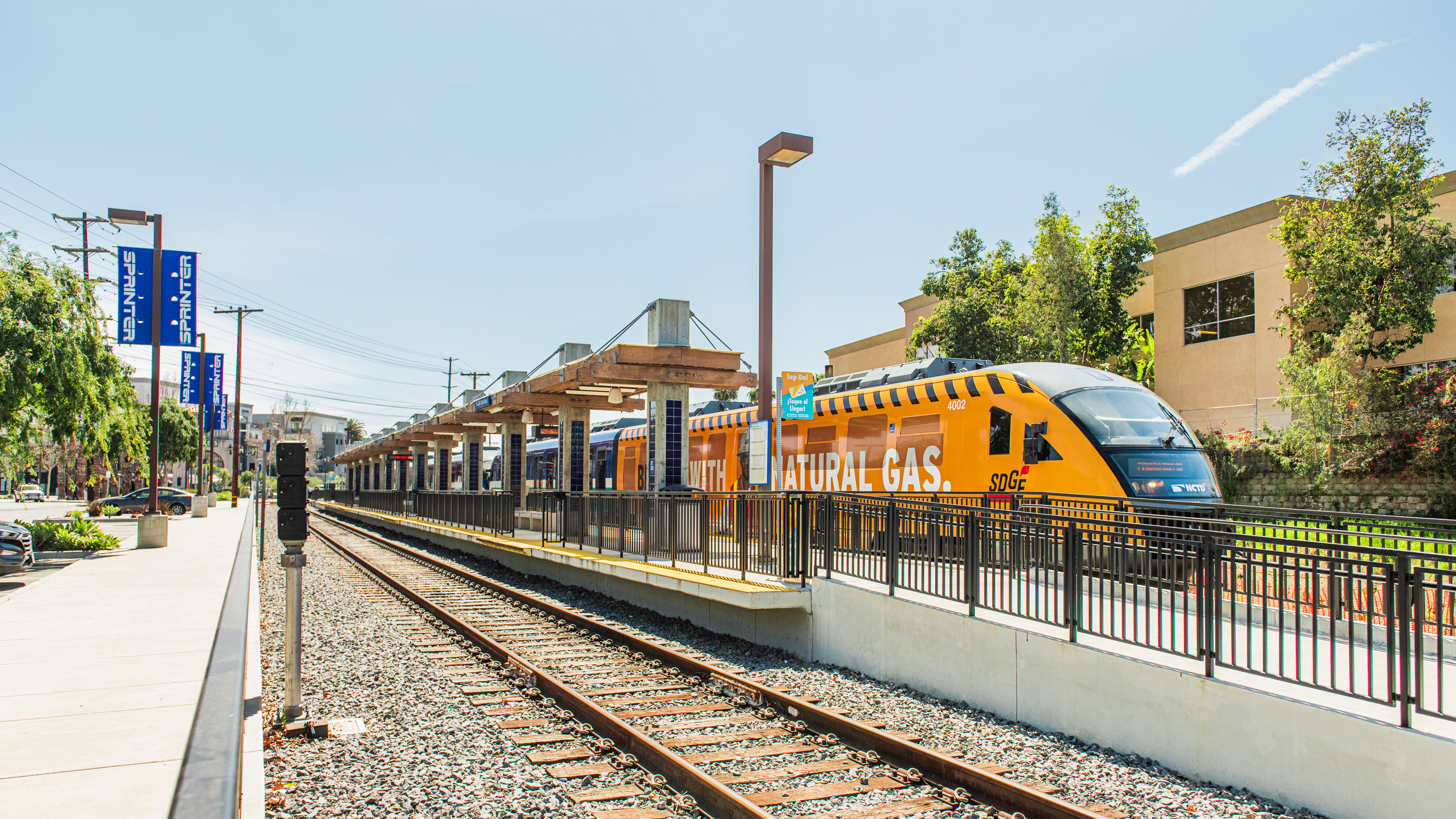
The Sprinter light rail train preparing to depart the platform at the Escondido Transit Center

The Sprinter hybrid rail service, operated by NCTD, links the transit center to Oceanside using the existing 22-mile (35 km)-long Escondido Subdivision trackage of the San Diego Northern Railroad. The rail line opened in 2008, making Escondido one of the first cities in the United States to operate Siemens Desiro class diesel multiple units manufactured in Germany. At the Oceanside Transit Center, the Sprinter connects to three commuter rail lines (the Coaster, Orange County and Inland Empire–Orange County lines) and is also served by Amtrak's Pacific Surfliner.

The California High Speed Rail Authority listed Escondido as a stop along the proposed high-speed rail system running from Southern to Northern California.

BNSF Railway provides freight rail service to Escondido on the Escondido Subdivision.

=== Utilities ===
San Diego Gas & Electric is the electric utility for the city. The City of Escondido Water Utilities serves most customers within the city while Rincon del Diablo Municipal Water District serves potable and recycled water to the greater Escondido valley and some portions of the incorporated city.

=== Health care ===
Palomar Medical Center is a hospital located in west Escondido near the I-15/78 interchange. It is the only designated trauma center in northern San Diego County. It opened in 2012, replacing a PMC facility that has stood in central Escondido since 1950. The original Palomar hospital, located east of downtown at the Valley Parkway/Grand Avenue junction, remained open and was rebranded Palomar Medical Center Downtown, serving as a standby/overflow medical center until 2021, when it was scheduled for demolition. The building was completely demolished in 2022.

== Religion ==
Westminster Seminary California is located in Escondido.

The Meeting of the Lord Monastery is located at 14952 Stonebridge Road outside of Escondido. The monastery, in the care of V. Rev. Milan Vuković, is under the omophorion of Bishop Maksim Vasiljević of the Serbian Orthodox Church.

Ascension Lutheran Church is a Christian church of the Wisconsin Evangelical Lutheran Synod in Escondido.

Deer Park Monastery is a Buddhist sanctuary that occupies 400 acres (1.6 km^{2}) in the hills north of Escondido and west of Daley Ranch. It is one of three monasteries in the United States under the direction of well-known Zen teacher Thich Nhat Hanh.

== Notable people ==
- Anacani: featured singer with the Lawrence Welk orchestra
- Tom Anderson: co-founder of MySpace
- Corey Baird: soccer player
- Lester Bangs: rock music critic
- Texas Rose Bascom: movie actress, "World's Greatest Female Trick Roper," National Cowgirl Hall of Fame inductee
- Billy Bevan: silent and talkies movie actor, born Orange, New South Wales, Australia 1887; died Escondido, California 1957.
- Ken Block: rally car driver, and founder of DC Shoes
- Harold F. Blum: physiologist who first explored sunlight-induced skin cancer
- Sam Brannan: California's first millionaire
- E. H. Bronner: soapmaker
- Ray Conniff: bandleader and arranger
- Joe Coscarart, former Boston Braves infielder
- Pete Coscarart: former Brooklyn Dodgers infielder
- D. D. Crabb, rancher and Arizona State Senator
- Gavvy Cravath: former right fielder for the Philadelphia Phillies
- Madison Cunningham: musician
- Richard Denning: actor, An Affair to Remember, Creature from the Black Lagoon; died in Escondido
- Alan H. Friedman, novelist and literary critic.
- Caitlin Glass: voice actress and ADR director
- Tony Gorodeckas: actor and film producer
- Robert Klark Graham: eugenicist and inventor, founder of the Repository for Germinal Choice ("Nobel Prize Sperm Bank")
- Chapman Grant (1887–1983) herpetologist, historian
- Steve Hendrickson: former Chargers football player
- George Horine: held world record in the high jump; won an Olympic bronze medal
- Milan Iloski: soccer player
- Randy Johnson: Major League infielder, special assistant to Oakland A's GM Billy Beane; graduate of Escondido High School
- Jacque Jones: former baseball player for the Minnesota Twins
- Kevin Kiner: film and television composer
- Jovan Kirovski: forward for the L.A. Galaxy MLS team
- Elisabeth Kübler-Ross: founder and resident of the "Shanti Nilaya" (Home of Peace), retreat in Escondido in the late 1970s and early 1980s
- Korey Lee: Major League Baseball catcher for the Chicago White Sox
- Jim Londos: professional wrestler
- Shannon MacMillan: professional soccer player and graduate of San Pasqual High School
- Anthony Menconi: marine engineer from California Maritime Academy
- Haley Moore: amateur golfer
- Deborah Jeane Palfrey: the so-called D.C. Madam
- Robbie Peralta: MMA UFC fighter
- Pamela Radcliff: historian and professor at the University of California at San Diego and an authority on the history of modern Spain.
- Mark Redman: professional baseball player and graduate of Escondido High School
- Steve Reeves: bodybuilder, Mr. Universe, and actor, Hercules; died in Escondido
- Brett Salisbury: college football quarterback, member of Escondido's 1981 Little League World Series team, and younger brother of Sean Salisbury.
- Sean Salisbury: former NFL quarterback and ESPN anchorman, and graduate of Orange Glen High School; older brother of Brett Salisbury
- Brian Simnjanovski: punter for the Berlin Thunder, New York Jets, Arizona Cardinals, and Tampa Bay Buccaneers NFL teams
- Riley Steele: pornographic actress
- Randy Vasquez: actor
- Hernán D. Vera: federal judge on the United States District Court for the Central District of California
- Eric Weddle: free safety for the NFL San Diego Chargers; resides in Escondido
- Royce Williams: ace Navy pilot during the Korean War
- Harold Bell Wright: author in the 1920s and 1930s
- Andrea Zittel: contemporary artist, graduate of San Pasqual High School

== See also ==
- Daily Times-Advocate – Escondido newspaper published from 1909 to 1995
- North County Times
- Rincon bleachers
- The Road to Escondido, an album by J.J. Cale, Colin Tappe and Eric Clapton
