= Escondido Public Library =

Public library system in California, United States

Coordinates: 33°7′15″N 117°4′46″W

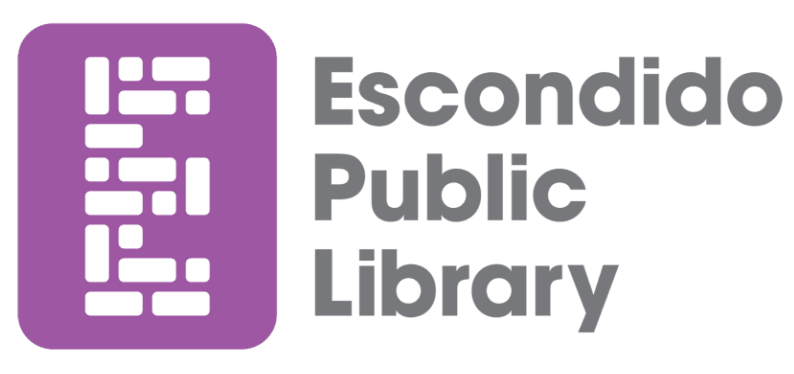

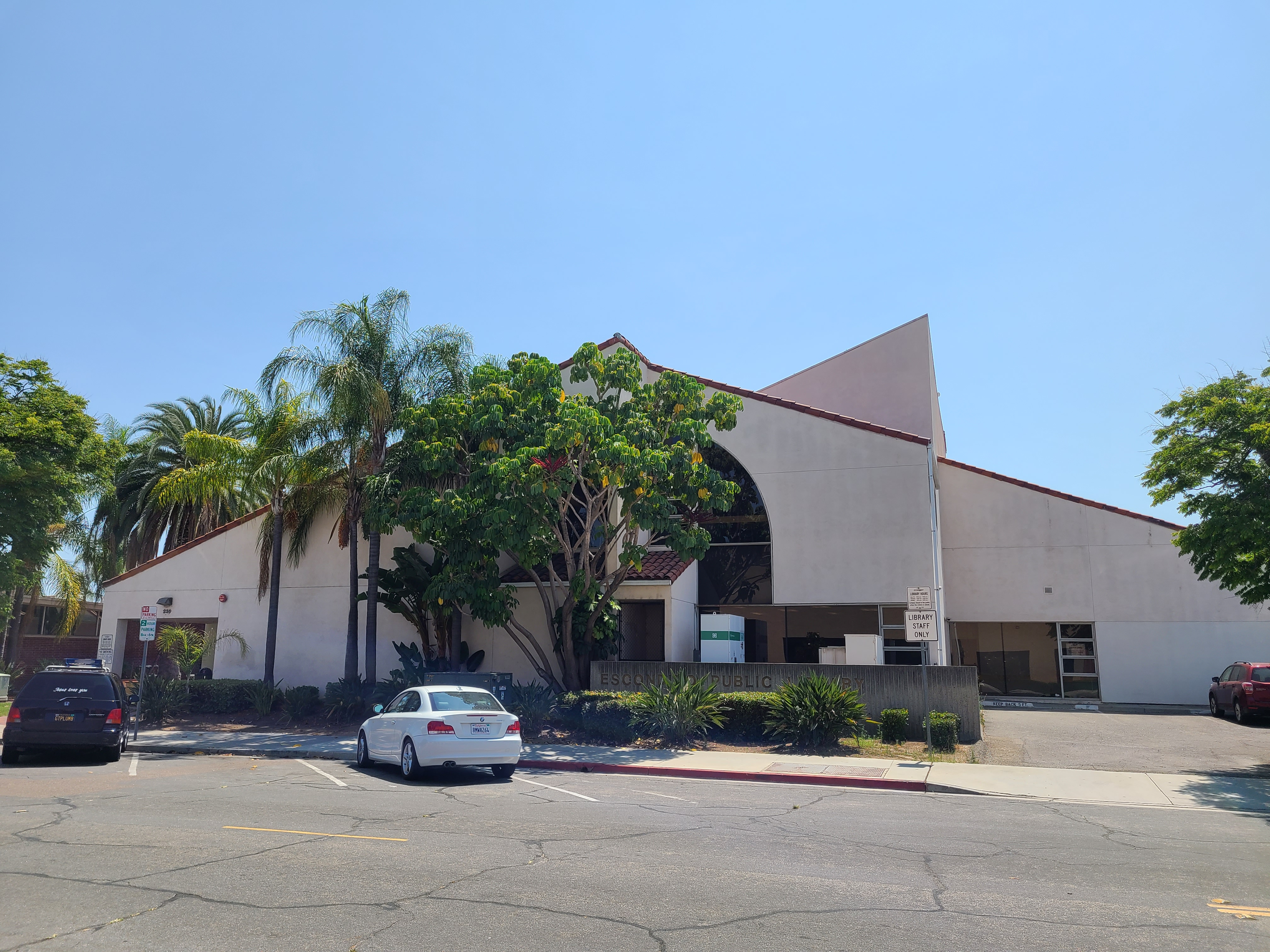
- Exterior of the main library, 2021
- Location: 239 S. Kalmia St., Escondido, California
- Established: 1893

Access and use
- Circulation: 514,792
- Population served: 151,613

Other information
- Website: escondido.gov/162/Library/

The Escondido Public Library is a public library system serving Escondido, California. The collection of the library contains 166,629 volumes, circulates 514,792 items per year, and serves a population of 151,613 residents.

The library system consists of the Main Branch and the Pioneer Room, its local history and genealogy archive.

== History ==
In 1890, the Escondido Dramatic Club donated its profits to purchase books and distributed them at a local school "for the use of the pupils and the general public". The Escondido Public Library was founded in February 1891.

The Escondido Public Library Association was established in 1893 and moved to the Bank of Escondido, located at the corner of Grand Avenue and Lime (now Broadway). On March 13, 1893, the by-laws and constitution were adopted, and a week later, the Library Board of Trustees were elected for a term of one year.

=== First library ===
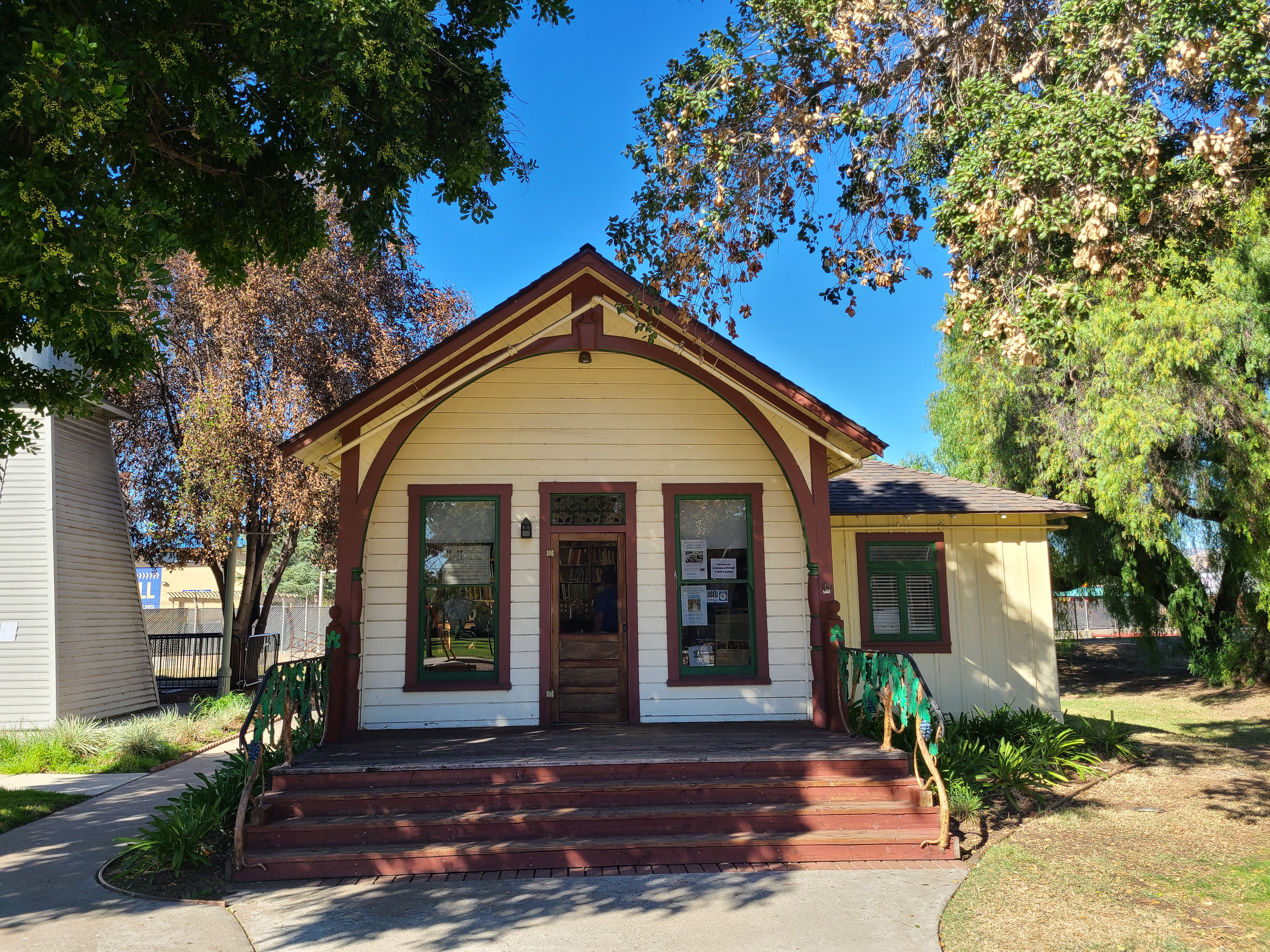
First library, now located at Grape Day Park

In 1894, the Escondido Land & Town Company donated two lots of land to the Escondido Public Library. The first library building was a small one-room building located on the eastern end of Grand Avenue and would remain in operation until 1910. It was relocated to Grape Day Park in 1971.

In April 1898, the City of Escondido took over operation, making the Library a City department.

=== The second (Carnegie) and third libraries ===
Mrs. W.H. Baldridge, secretary of the Library Board of Trustees, appealed to Carnegie Library committee for funding to build a new library. With Andrew Carnegie funds and a gift of land, a new library was built in 1910 on Kalmia and Third Avenue.

Due to limited space, a new library building (now the Mathes Center) was constructed in 1956. By 1980, Escondido had grown to 67,000 persons, and the library incorporated children's and audiovisual services.

=== Current library and the East Valley Branch ===
Revenue-sharing funds were set aside for a new facility. Library operations were moved in December 1980 into the present two-story, 40,000-square-foot (3,700 m^{2}) building.

In June 1996, the 13,000-square-foot (1,200 m^{2}) East Valley Branch was opened in the East Valley Community Center on East Valley Parkway. In December 1996, the Pioneer Room was opened in the Mathes Center adjacent to the main library. In 2011, the East Valley Branch Library was closed. In January 2013, the Escondido Technology Center (ETC) was re-opened in part of the original space of the East Valley Branch but closed in June 2016.

==== Pioneer Room ====
Adjacent to the main library, the Pioneer Room was established in 1992, with bequest from local historian Frances Beven Ryan (1901–1990). It contains a research room and a local history collection with books, journals, photographs, and archival material. The family history genealogy research material primarily contains reference books.

=== Grand Jury Report ===
In March 2016, the San Diego County Grand Jury issued a report after "questions [were] raised concerning the adequacy of the library to server the community."

The 2016/2017 Grand Jury Report found that:

1. The Escondido Public Library is inadequate to serve the community.
2. The Escondido library's programs do not meet the community needs.
3. Unused allocated funds from the Escondido Library operating budget are not used to benefit the library.
4. An effective marketing plan is not being employed to attract more people to the library's resources, programs, and activities.

The City responded, disagreeing with many of the findings.

=== Outsourcing library services ===
On October 18, 2017, the Escondido City Council voted 4–1 to contract with Maryland-based Library Systems & Services to operate the library. Councilmembers Ed Gallo, Michael Morasco, John Masson, and Mayor Sam Abed voted in favor of the 10-year contract, with councilmember Olga Diaz in opposition.
