= Manteca High School =

Location
- 450 East Yosemite Avenue; Manteca, California 95336; United States; 37.79684°N 121.21191°W

Information
- Type: Public high school
- Motto: "A Tradition of Excellence"
- Established: 1920; 106 years ago
- School district: Manteca Unified School District
- CEEB code: 051900
- Principal: Megan Peterson
- Teaching staff: 95.04 (FTE)
- Grades: 9-12
- Gender: Co-educational
- Enrollment: 1,858 (2023–2024)
- Student to teacher ratio: 19.55
- Colors: Forest Green and White
- Fight song: On Manteca
- Athletics conference: Valley Oak League; Sac-Joaquin Section
- Mascot: Buffalos
- Accreditation: Western Association of Schools and Colleges
- Newspaper: The Tower
- Yearbook: Tower
- Website: www.mantecausd.net/mantecahighschool

Manteca High School is a public, co-educational secondary school in Manteca, California, United States that was established on May 21, 1920. It is the oldest school within Manteca Unified School District. Although originally built with a tower, it was torn down because the structure failed to meet earthquake regulations.

== Athletics ==
Manteca High is mainly known for the success in its football program. The Buffaloes are one of the most victorious teams in the area and have won nine section titles since the beginning of the 21st century (2001, 2005, 2006, 2013, 2016, 2017, 2019, 2021, 2022) with 13 appearances. They also had the state's longest winning streak (26) for a few months that stretched from October 21, 2005, to October 19, 2007. Additionally, Manteca has won a total of 15 Sac-Joaquin Section Team Championships (6 since 2013) and 32 Individual Sac-Joaquin Section Championships in the sports of wrestling, basketball, track & field, golf, tennis and swimming. The baseball team won its first ever section and state championship in 2014, followed by another section title in 2016. The girls soccer team won its first ever section championship in 2016 as well, followed by a girls tennis section title the same year. Finally, also in 2016, Manteca won its first state title in boys basketball by defeating Ayala High School of Chino Hills 60–51. It was the first state championship in boys basketball in Manteca Unified history.

== Notable alumni ==
- Ernie Barber, former NFL center for the Washington Redskins
- Jay Blahnik, fitness expert, author, speaker and Vice-President of Fitness Technologies for Apple Inc.
- Milo Candini, former Major League Baseball player
- Sammy L. Davis, Medal of Honor recipient
- Jacob De Jesus, NFL wide receiver for the Kansas City Chiefs
- Tony Dominguez Jr., retired professional boxer
- Kiwi Gardner, basketball player
- Ken Huckaby, Major League Baseball player
- Kim Komenich, Pulitzer Prize-winning photojournalist
- John J. McFall, former Democratic member of the United States House of Representatives
- Don Morgan, former NFL strong safety for the Minnesota Vikings and Arizona Cardinals
- Ted Nuce, World Champion bull rider, Pro Rodeo Hall of Fame
- Justin Roiland, executive producer, voice actor and co-creator of Rick and Morty
- Paul Wiggin, former American football player and coach
- Kenny Wooten, basketball player
