= Giana Riley =

American-Mexican soccer player (born 2004)

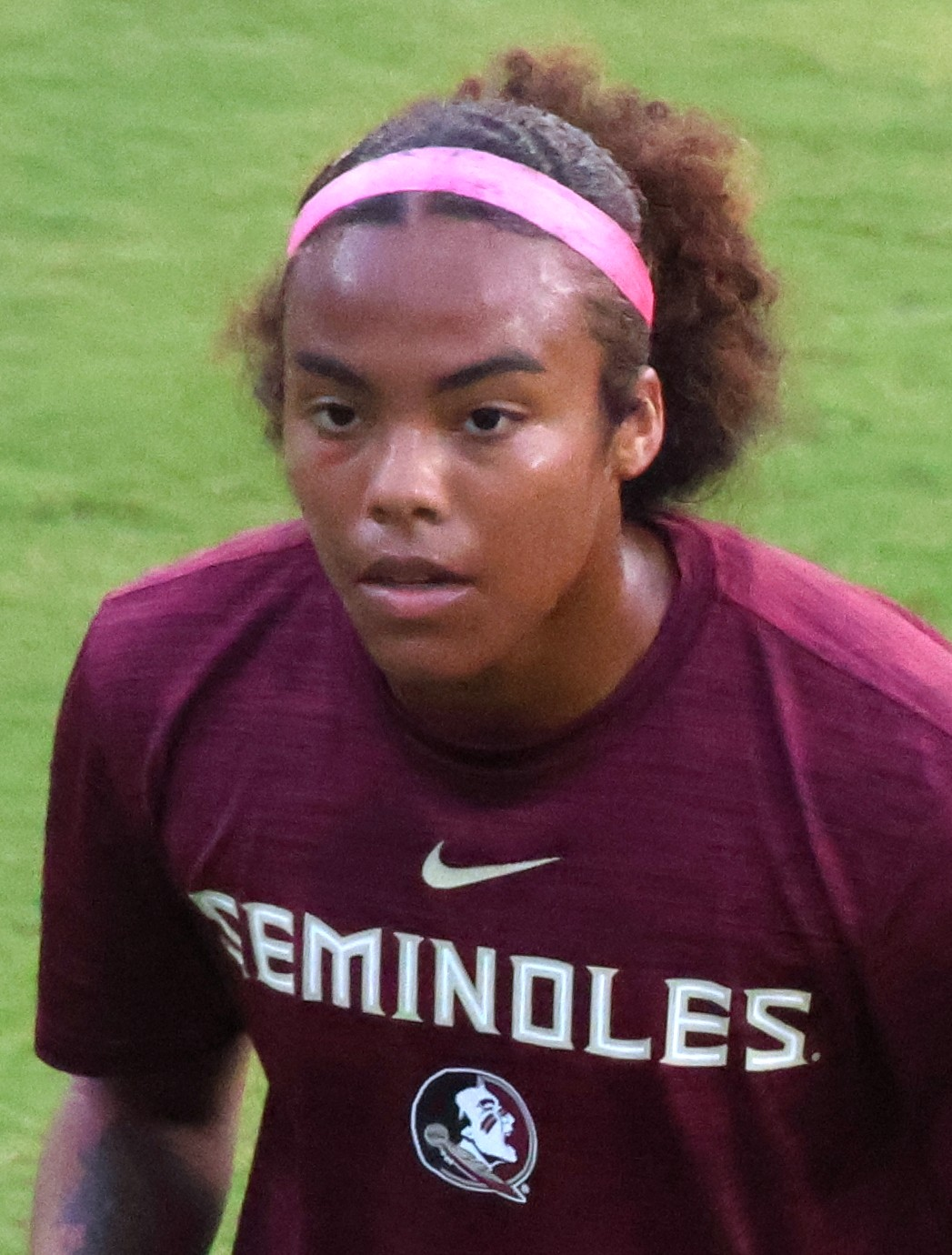
- Riley with Florida State in 2025

Personal information
- Full name: Giana Alexandria Riley
- Date of birth: April 13, 2004 (age 22)
- Height: 5 ft 8 in (1.73 m)
- Position: Forward

Team information
- Current team: Club América
- Number: 30

Youth career
- De Anza Force
- Kimball Jaguars

College career
Years	Team	Apps	(Gls)
2022–2023	Gonzaga Bulldogs	34	(17)
2024–2025	Florida State Seminoles	29	(3)

Senior career*
Years	Team	Apps	(Gls)
2023–2024	California Storm	21	(18)
2025	Oakland Soul	4	(3)
2026–	Club América	10	(0)

International career^{‡}
2024	United States U-20	10	(1)
- * Club domestic league appearances and goals as of 24 May 2026 ‡ National team caps and goals as of 8 September 2024

Giana Alexandria Riley (born April 13, 2004) is a professional soccer player who plays as a forward for Liga MX Femenil side Club América. Born in the United States, she has committed to play for the Mexico national team.

Riley played college soccer for the Gonzaga Bulldogs and the Florida State Seminoles, winning the 2025 national championship with the Seminoles. She also played college basketball and ran track for the Bulldogs. She won bronze with the United States at the 2024 FIFA U-20 Women's World Cup.

== Early life ==
Riley grew up in Manteca, California. She was a multi-sport athlete at Kimball High School in Tracy, where she played soccer, basketball, and track. She played club soccer for De Anza Force, earning ECNL all-conference honors. She committed to play college soccer for the Gonzaga Bulldogs in her junior year.

== College career ==
Riley scored 5 goals with 4 assists in 18 appearances for the Gonzaga Bulldogs as a freshman in 2022, earning West Coast Conference (WCC) all-freshman honors. In her sophomore year in 2023, Riley led the WCC with 12 goals and added 6 assists in 20 games, earning first-team All-WCC honors. She scored a hat trick against Pepperdine to clinch Gonzaga's first-ever WCC championship and earn their first NCAA tournament berth since 2005, reaching the second round.

While at Gonzaga, Riley also walked on to the school's injury-depleted basketball team, giving them numbers in training and appearing in nine games and posting two blocks as a freshman. In the spring as a sophomore, she joined the Gonzaga track and field team and set the program record in the 200 meters (25.86 s). She also played summer soccer for the California Storm in the USL W League, scoring a goal a game and leading the expansion team to the national playoffs. She later played for Oakland Soul in the USL W League.

Riley transferred to the reigning national champion Florida State Seminoles before her junior year in 2024, occupying a reserve role. While she missed part of the season at the 2024 FIFA U-20 Women's World Cup, she played in 14 games and scored 3 goals with 2 assists. She helped Florida State win their fifth consecutive ACC tournament and earn a one seed in the NCAA tournament, where they lost in the second round on penalties. In her senior year in 2025, she played in 15 games and had 2 assists as the Seminoles won their fifth national championship.

== Club career ==
In January 2026, Riley signed her first professional contract with Liga MX Femenil club América. She made her professional debut as a 59th-minute substitute for Sarah Luebbert in a 6–0 win over Necaxa on January 17.

== International career ==
Riley was first called into training with the United States under-20 team in January 2024. She made the roster for the 2024 FIFA U-20 Women's World Cup, appearing in four games as the team placed third, its best result since 2012. In April 2025, she was called into training with the Mexico under-23 team. Two months later, she trained with the United States under-23 team concurrently with the senior national team.

On 25 June 2026, Riley's change of association request was granted, successfully switching her allegiance to play for the Mexico national team ahead of the 2026 CONCACAF W Championship in the United States.

== Honors and awards ==
Club América

- Liga MX Femenil: Clausura 2026
- Liga MX Femenil: Campeón de Campeonas 2025–26
- CONCACAF W Champions Cup: 2025–26

Gonzaga Bulldogs

- West Coast Conference: 2023

Florida State Seminoles

- NCAA Division I women's soccer tournament: 2025
- ACC women's soccer tournament: 2024

United States U-20

- FIFA U-20 Women's World Cup bronze medal: 2024

Individual

- First-team All-WCC: 2023
- WCC all-freshman team: 2022
