= Lathrop High School =

Lathrop High School may refer to:

- Lathrop High School (Alaska)
- Lathrop High School (California)
