= Stanford Crossing, California =

Stanford Crossing
- Planned community
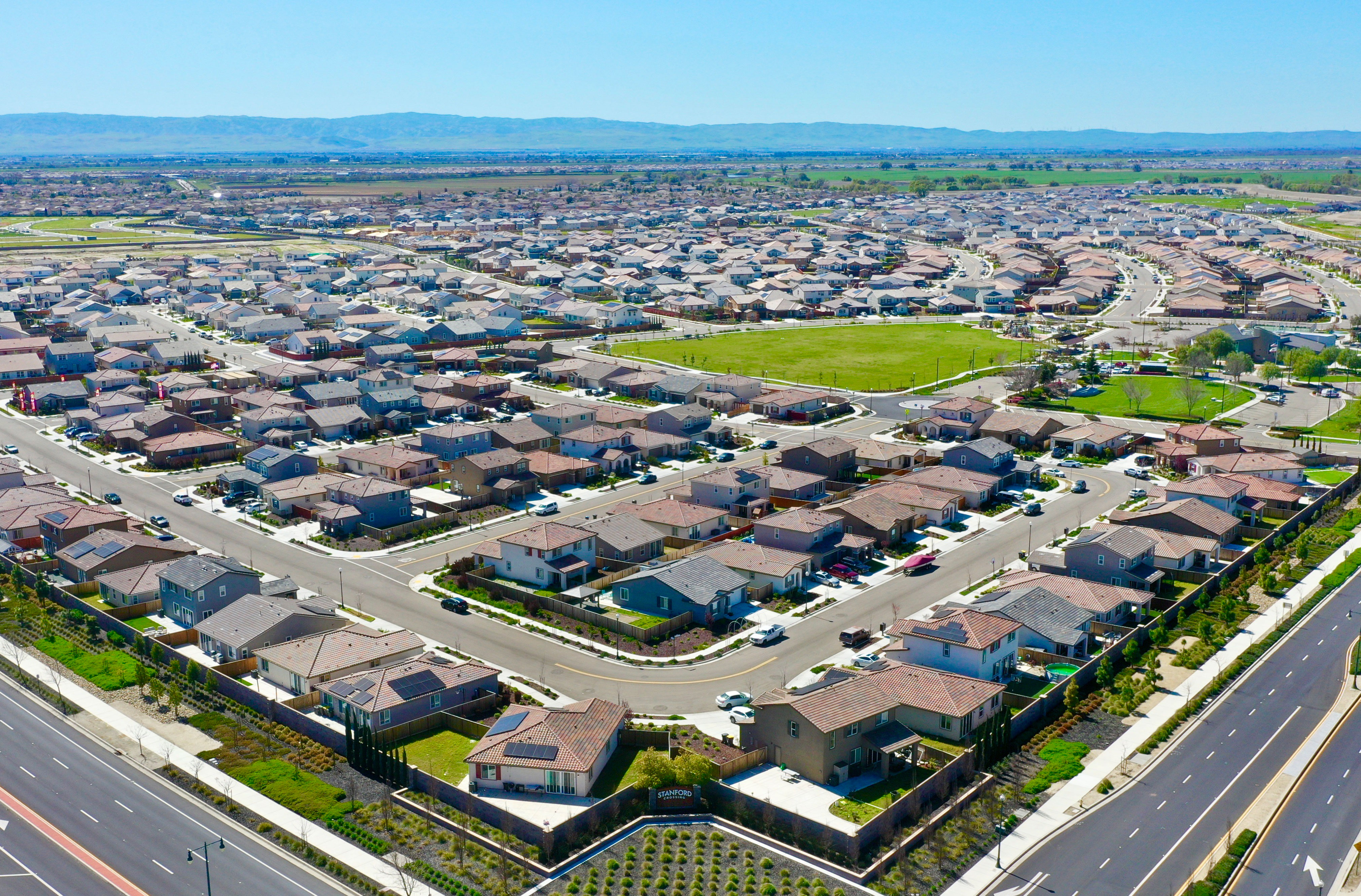

- Location within California Location within the United States
- Coordinates: 37°49′14″N 121°18′6″W
- Country: United States
- State: California
- County: San Joaquin
- City: Lathrop
- Time zone: UTC-8 (PST)
  - Summer (DST): UTC-7 (PDT)
- ZIP code: 95330
- Area code: 209
- Website: standfordcrossing.com

Stanford Crossing is a planned community in Lathrop, California. The community is located west of Interstate 5 and east of the San Joaquin River on 1,068 acres. Stanford Crossing was built as part of the larger Central Lathrop Specific Plan development project to create "a vibrant and livable community" within the area. The community is planned for over 1,500 homes, and includes over 100 acres (40 ha) designated for commercial and retail uses.

As of March 2024, over 900 homes have been built at Stanford Crossing. In addition to those homes, the community holds several parks, athletic facilities, a public library, outdoor amphitheater, and the Lathrop Generations Center, with further plans for a large commercial center to be developed on site.

== History ==
The name Stanford Crossing was inspired by the family who helped found Lathrop — Leland Stanford and his wife Jane Stanford (née Lathrop) — and the city's significant role in the 19th century railroad expansion. At the time, Leland was president of the Central Pacific Railroad and played a large part in the completion of the first transcontinental railroad at Mossdale Crossing in Lathrop, nearby to the site of Stanford Crossing. Similarly, the 4.13 acre Leland and Jane Stanford Park within the community was named in their honor.

On November 9, 2004, the City of Lathrop adopted the Central Lathrop Specific Plan (CLSP) to expand the city limits and develop the surrounding area. The CLSP consisted of two development phases, the first of which designated land usage of approximately 797 acres south of Dos Reis Road for a residential mixed use community that would include public facilities, outdoor features, commercial areas, residential neighborhoods, and the city's first high school, Lathrop High School.

In 2005, the City of Lathrop annexed the site proposed for the project.

== Planning and construction ==
The development of Stanford Crossing and its residential lots were subdivided into four separate phases. The builders contracted to complete these phases were D.R. Horton, K. Hovnanian, KB Home, Meritage Homes, Richmond American Homes, Taylor Morrison, and Tri Pointe Homes. The City of Lathrop Planning Commission initially approved construction on the site in December 2013, and the first homes were delivered in 2020.

The project was initially managed by Richland Planned Communities, a subsidiary of Richard Investments, LLC, however after the 2008 financial crisis, they were unable to fulfill the development agreement and the project was halted. In December 2016, the San Joaquin Council of Governments voted to reassign development of the CLSP to an entity managed by Saybrook Fund Advisors, LLC. Within a year, as the new master developer, Saybrook completed several CLSP construction projects left unfinished by the previous developer, including connecting Lathrop High to the existing city sewer system. This subsequently also helped pave the way for the development of the plan's proposed residential neighborhoods at Stanford Crossing. As part of the development, new stormwater, water, sewer, and recycled water infrastructure was put in place.

== Neighborhoods ==
Stanford Crossing includes the following 14 neighborhoods:

- Arcadia by KB Home
- Bella Vita by D.R. Horton
- Cascade by D.R. Horton
- Encore by Richmond American Homes
- Indigo by D.R. Horton
- Iron Pointe by KB Home
- Journey by Tri Pointe Homes
- Legacy by Taylor Morrison
- Meritage by Meritage Homes
- Northpointe by Richmond American Homes
- Pacifica by K Hovnanian
- Riverchase by KB Home
- Seasons by Richmond American Homes
- Sparrow by D.R. Horton

== Parks ==
Stanford Crossing is home to 35 acres of community parks.

Leland and Jane Stanford Park, located on Spartan Way behind the Lathrop Generations Center, has two playgrounds, covered tables, and areas for concerts and sporting events. Rotary Park sits between Shearwater Road and Tern Drive, and has a pirate-themed playground, basketball courts, and covered picnic area. Between Spartan Way and the San Joaquin River, at the westernmost boundaries of the community, the 5-acre River Park North has a ropes course, playground, picnic tables, workout stations, and large grass areas. Lion's Park is a 4.6 acre park situated on Faber Drive and Brandon lane with a playground, grassy area, and picnic tables.
