= Manteca Unified School District =

School district in California, United States

Manteca Unified School District (MUSD) is a school district based in French Camp, Lathrop, Manteca, and Stockton, in California.

== About ==
Schools in MUSD follow a modified traditional calendar with approximately 23,000 students. Elementary schools are from Kindergarten to eighth grade. The balance of required education is finished in high school. The district was formed in 1966.

== Schools ==
- August Knodt Elementary School
- Brock Elliott Elementary School
- French Camp Elementary School
- George Komure Elementary School
- George McParland Elementary School
- Golden West Elementary School
- Great Valley Elementary School
- Joseph Widmer Elementary school
- Joshua Cowell Elementary School
- Lathrop Elementary School
- Lincoln Elementary School
- Mossdale Elementary School
- Neil Hafley Elementary School
- New Haven Elementary School
- Nile Garden Elementary School
- Sequoia Elementary School
- Shasta Elementary School
- Stella Brockman Elementary School
- Veritas Elementary School
- Walter E. Woodward Elementary School

=== High schools ===
- East Union High School
- Lathrop High School
- Manteca High School
- Sierra High School
- Weston Ranch High School

=== Other ===
- BE.Tech Career Academies
- Calla High School
- Lindbergh Educational Center
- Manteca Day School
- METC (Adult School)
- New Vision Educational Center
- Online Academy

== Transportation ==
Manteca USD consists of the following buses:

- Gen 3 1997-2002 Thomas Saf-T-Liner ER
- Gen 2 Thomas Saf-T-Liner HDX
- 2010 IC Bus RE Series (MaxxForce DT)
- IC Bus CE Series (MaxxForce DT)
- 1989 Crown Supercoach (Detroit 6N71) (to be phased out as soon as possible)
- Blue Bird All American RE (to be introduced in the future, replacing old Crown Supercoach buses)
