= Zelmar Vedder =

American football player (born 2002)

Profile
- Position: Cornerback

Personal information
- Born: November 9, 2002 (age 23)
- Listed height: 6 ft 3 in (1.91 m)
- Listed weight: 195 lb (88 kg)

Career information
- High school: East Union (Manteca, California)
- College: Modesto JC (2021); Sacramento State (2022–2024); Houston (2025)
- NFL draft: 2026: undrafted

Career history
- Kansas City Chiefs (2026)*
- * Offseason or practice squad member only

Zelmar "Z" Vedder (born November 9, 2002) is an American professional football cornerback. He played college football for the Modesto Pirates, Sacramento State Hornets, and Houston Cougars.

== Early life ==
Vedder was born as one of two children to Yolanda Dixon. His father David Vedder played college football at Temple (1982–1986). Vedder's older brother Christopher played college football for San Jose State from 2004–2006 before playing professionally for the Miami Dolphins from 2006–2008 and San Jose SaberCats from 2008–2011. Standing 6 ft 3 in (1.91 m) tall and weighing 175 pounds (79 kg), Vedder was a two-sport athlete in high school, playing both point guard and shooting guard positions for the East Union Lancers basketball team. On the East Union Lancers football team, Vedder played cornerback, slotback and wide receiver. He earned All-Valley Oak League honors and was named the team Most Valuable Player. He graduated in 2021.

== College career ==
=== Modesto Junior College ===
Vedder enrolled at Modesto Junior College where he aided the Pirates football team in finishing the 2021 season with an 8–3 record.

=== Sacramento State ===
In 2022, Vedder transferred to Sacramento State where he redshirted the season to recover from a knee injury. He joined the field as a cornerback with the Hornets in all 13 games of the 2023 season. He finished his debut season with two starts, 14 total tackles, including nine solos, and one pass breakup. During the 2024 season, Vedder started 10 of 11 games finishing with 44 total tackles, including 33 solos, one forced fumble, one interception and eight pass breakups. While at Sacramento, he majored in communications.

=== Houston ===
Vedder transferred to the University of Houston where he played his senior season. He joined the Houston Cougars as a defensive back for the 2025 season. After playing in all 13 games, Vedder finished third on the team with seven pass breakups and was named part of the Academic All-Big 12 Team.

== Professional career ==
Pre-draft measurables
Height	Weight	Arm length	Hand span	Wingspan	40-yard dash	10-yard split	20-yard split	20-yard shuttle	Three-cone drill	Vertical jump	Broad jump	Bench press
6 ft 0 1/2 in (1.84 m)	192 lb (87 kg)	31 3/4 in (0.81 m)	9 1/2 in (0.24 m)	6 ft 5 5/8 in (1.97 m)	4.51 s	1.57 s	2.56 s	4.19 s	6.90 s	39.5 in (1.00 m)	10 ft 10 in (3.30 m)	10 reps
All values from Pro Day

Vedder signed with the Kansas City Chiefs as an undrafted free agent following the 2026 NFL draft. On August 30, 2026, he was waived by the Chiefs as a part of final roster cuts.

== Personal life ==
Vedders enjoys bowling, playing video games and content creation.
