= Central Valley Baptist Church =

Church in California, United States

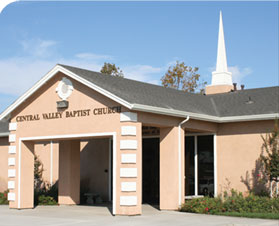
- Central Valley Baptist Church
- 37.862°N 121.255°W
- Location: 10948 S. Airport Way. Manteca, California 95336
- Country: United States
- Denomination: Independent Baptist
- Website: http://www.cvbcmanteca.com/

Clergy
- Pastor: Parry Dalzell

Central Valley Baptist Church is a baptist church located in Manteca, California; centered in between the cities of Stockton and Modesto. Along with the English-language auditorium, the church also houses a Spanish-language ministry, which is sometimes named Iglesia Bautista del Valle Central, other ministries include Filipino-language, Singles, Young Married Couples, Bus/Shuttle, Nursing Home, Youth, and Teen.
