= FIFA association changes in 2026 =

Footballers' changes of international allegiance

This is a list of association footballers who switched their international allegiance to a different football association to the one they previously represented under FIFA eligibility rules in the year 2026.

== List ==
As of 13 September 2026

Player	Former association	New association	Decision date	Ref.
Brielle Tautua	Samoa	American Samoa	12 January 2026	
Richard Ledezma	United States	Mexico	20 January 2026	
Valeria Luzio	Puerto Rico	Peru	26 January 2026	
Jairo Vélez	Ecuador	Peru	29 January 2026	
Mathilde Janzen	Germany	Sweden	3 February 2026	
Álvaro Fidalgo	Spain	Mexico	5 February 2026	
Leandro Padilla	Nicaragua	Honduras	5 February 2026	
Maurício	Brazil	Paraguay	9 February 2026	
Tyra Bagiante	Tonga	Australia	10 February 2026	
Marcelo Flores	Mexico	Canada	11 February 2026	
Somea Položen	Sweden	Bosnia and Herzegovina	13 February 2026	
Layla Drury	Wales	England	19 February 2026	
Christopher Atherton	Northern Ireland	Republic of Ireland	24 February 2026	
Amara Condé	Germany	Guinea	26 February 2026	
Lakeesha Eijken	Netherlands	Suriname	2 March 2026	
Andrei Coubiș	Italy	Romania	4 March 2026	
Rani Khedira	Germany	Tunisia	4 March 2026	
Ayaz Guliyev	Azerbaijan	Russia	5 March 2026	
Lamine Diaby-Fadiga	France	Guinea	6 March 2026	
Bujar Pllana	Kosovo	Albania	9 March 2026	
Paul Wanner	Germany	Austria	9 March 2026	
Carney Chukwuemeka	England	Austria	9 March 2026	
Jordan Semedo	France	Cape Verde	10 March 2026	
Fábio Duarte	Portugal	Cape Verde	10 March 2026	
Dominik Šimić	Switzerland	Croatia	11 March 2026	
Tanya Boychuk	Canada	Ukraine	11 March 2026	
Chardonnay Curran	United States	Philippines	11 March 2026	
Ryan Fosso	Switzerland	Cameroon	11 March 2026	
Emily Cassap	England	Northern Ireland	11 March 2026	
Ibrahim Cissoko	Netherlands	Guinea	11 March 2026	
Sami Bouhoudane	Netherlands	Morocco	13 March 2026	
Adrian Segečić	Australia	Croatia	13 March 2026	
Harvey Vale	England	Republic of Ireland	13 March 2026	
Brenda Meier	Switzerland	Peru	13 March 2026	
Dino Delić	Bosnia and Herzegovina	Austria	13 March 2026	
Jennifer Muñoz	Guatemala	United States	16 March 2026	
Oualid Agougil	Netherlands	Morocco	16 March 2026	
Ayoub Ouarghi	Netherlands	Morocco	16 March 2026	
Joël Piroe	Netherlands	Suriname	17 March 2026	
Ilija Maslarov	Switzerland	North Macedonia	18 March 2026	
Benjamin Khaderi	Netherlands	Morocco	18 March 2026	
Melayro Bogarde	Netherlands	Suriname	18 March 2026	
Lucy Day	England	Wales	23 March 2026	
Indy Botosso Kolster	Denmark	Brazil	24 March 2026	
Lyndon Turrell	Gibraltar	Thailand	25 March 2026	
Rayane Bounida	Belgium	Morocco	25 March 2026	
Dylan Scicluna	Malta	Australia	25 March 2026	
Saif Lazar	Belgium	Morocco	25 March 2026	
Ayres Ava	Samoa	American Samoa	25 March 2026	
Luis Hasa	Italy	Albania	26 March 2026	
Issa Diop	France	Morocco	26 March 2026	
Elye Wahi	France	Ivory Coast	28 March 2026	
Milica Denda	Serbia	Bosnia and Herzegovina	2 April 2026	
Arthur Okonkwo	England	Nigeria	6 April 2026	
Julliana Lisbeth	Dominican Republic	Peru	7 April 2026	
Vildan Kardeşler	Germany	Turkey	7 April 2026	
Ermin Mahmić	Austria	Bosnia and Herzegovina	1 May 2026	
Aleksandr Guboglo	Haiti	Canada	6 May 2026	
Serhiy Ihnatkov	Bosnia and Herzegovina	Ukraine	8 May 2026	
Ange-Yoan Bonny	France	Ivory Coast	8 May 2026	
Evagjelos Gjoka	Albania	Greece	11 May 2026	
Dario Naamo	Finland	Iraq	11 May 2026	
Ahmed Qasem	Sweden	Iraq	11 May 2026	
CJ dos Santos	United States	Cape Verde	13 May 2026	
Matias Fernandez-Pardo	Spain	Belgium	14 May 2026	
Keyrol Figueroa	United States	Honduras	14 May 2026	
Omar Carabalí	Chile	Ecuador	14 May 2026	
Ayyoub Bouaddi	France	Morocco	15 May 2026	
Mirko Milikić	Montenegro	Serbia	18 May 2026	
Cassandra Bogere	Norway	Sweden	19 May 2026	
Willsem Boussaid	France	Algeria	20 May 2026	
Nils Reichmuth	Switzerland	Chile	22 May 2026	
Julia Walentowicz	Sweden	Poland	26 May 2026	
Cristian Volpato	Italy	Australia	29 May 2026	
Valmir Matoshi	Switzerland	Kosovo	1 June 2026	
Hope McSheffrey	England	Wales	2 June 2026	
Omar Bolaños	Mexico	Guatemala	2 June 2026	
Miranda Solís	Mexico	Costa Rica	9 June 2026	
Derrick Luckassen	Netherlands	Ghana	9 June 2026	
Nassim El Harmouz	Netherlands	Morocco	17 June 2026	
Giana Riley	United States	Mexico	26 June 2026	
Nicolai Spatar	Russia	Moldova	25 August 2026	
Yanis Senhadji	Spain	Algeria	3 September 2026	
Alessandro Romano	Switzerland	Italy	9 September 2026	

== Summary ==
As of 13 September 2026

Country	Confed.	Changes		
Country	Confed.	G	L	N
Albania	UEFA	2	1	+1
Algeria	CAF	2	0	+2
American Samoa	OFC	2	0	+2
Australia	AFC	3	1	+2
Austria	UEFA	3	1	+2
Azerbaijan	UEFA	0	1	–1
Belgium	UEFA	1	2	–1
Bosnia and Herzegovina	UEFA	3	2	+1
Brazil	CONMEBOL	1	1	±0
Cameroon	CAF	1	0	+1
Canada	CONCACAF	2	1	+1
Cape Verde	CAF	3	0	+3
Chile	CONMEBOL	1	1	±0
Croatia	UEFA	2	0	+2
Denmark	UEFA	0	1	–1
Dominican Republic	CONCACAF	0	1	–1
Ecuador	CONCACAF	1	1	±0
England	UEFA	1	6	–5
Finland	UEFA	0	1	–1
France	UEFA	0	7	–7
Germany	UEFA	0	5	–5
Ghana	CAF	1	0	+1
Gibraltar	UEFA	0	1	–1
Greece	UEFA	1	0	+1
Guatemala	CONCACAF	1	1	±0
Guinea	CAF	3	0	+3
Haiti	CONCACAF	0	1	–1
Honduras	CONCACAF	2	0	+2
Iraq	AFC	2	0	+2
Italy	UEFA	1	3	–2
Ivory Coast	CAF	2	0	+2
Kosovo	UEFA	1	1	±0
Malta	UEFA	0	1	–1
Mexico	CONCACAF	3	3	±0
Moldova	UEFA	1	0	±0
Montenegro	UEFA	0	1	–1
Morocco	CAF	9	0	+9
Netherlands	UEFA	0	10	–10
Nicaragua	CONCACAF	0	1	–1
Nigeria	CAF	1	0	+1
Northern Ireland	UEFA	1	1	±0
North Macedonia	UEFA	1	0	+1
Norway	UEFA	0	1	–1
Paraguay	CONMEBOL	1	0	+1
Peru	CONMEBOL	4	0	+4
Philippines	AFC	1	0	+1
Poland	UEFA	1	0	+1
Portugal	UEFA	0	1	–1
Puerto Rico	CONCACAF	0	1	–1
Republic of Ireland	UEFA	2	0	+2
Romania	UEFA	1	0	+1
Russia	UEFA	1	1	±0
Samoa	OFC	0	2	–2
Serbia	UEFA	1	1	±0
Spain	UEFA	0	3	–3
Suriname	CONCACAF	3	0	+3
Sweden	UEFA	2	3	–1
Switzerland	UEFA	0	7	–7
Thailand	AFC	1	0	+1
Tonga	OFC	0	1	–1
Tunisia	CAF	1	0	+1
Turkey	UEFA	1	0	+1
Ukraine	UEFA	2	0	+2
United States	CONCACAF	1	4	–3
Wales	UEFA	2	1	+1
Total		79		
