= Lathrop, California =

City in California

- City
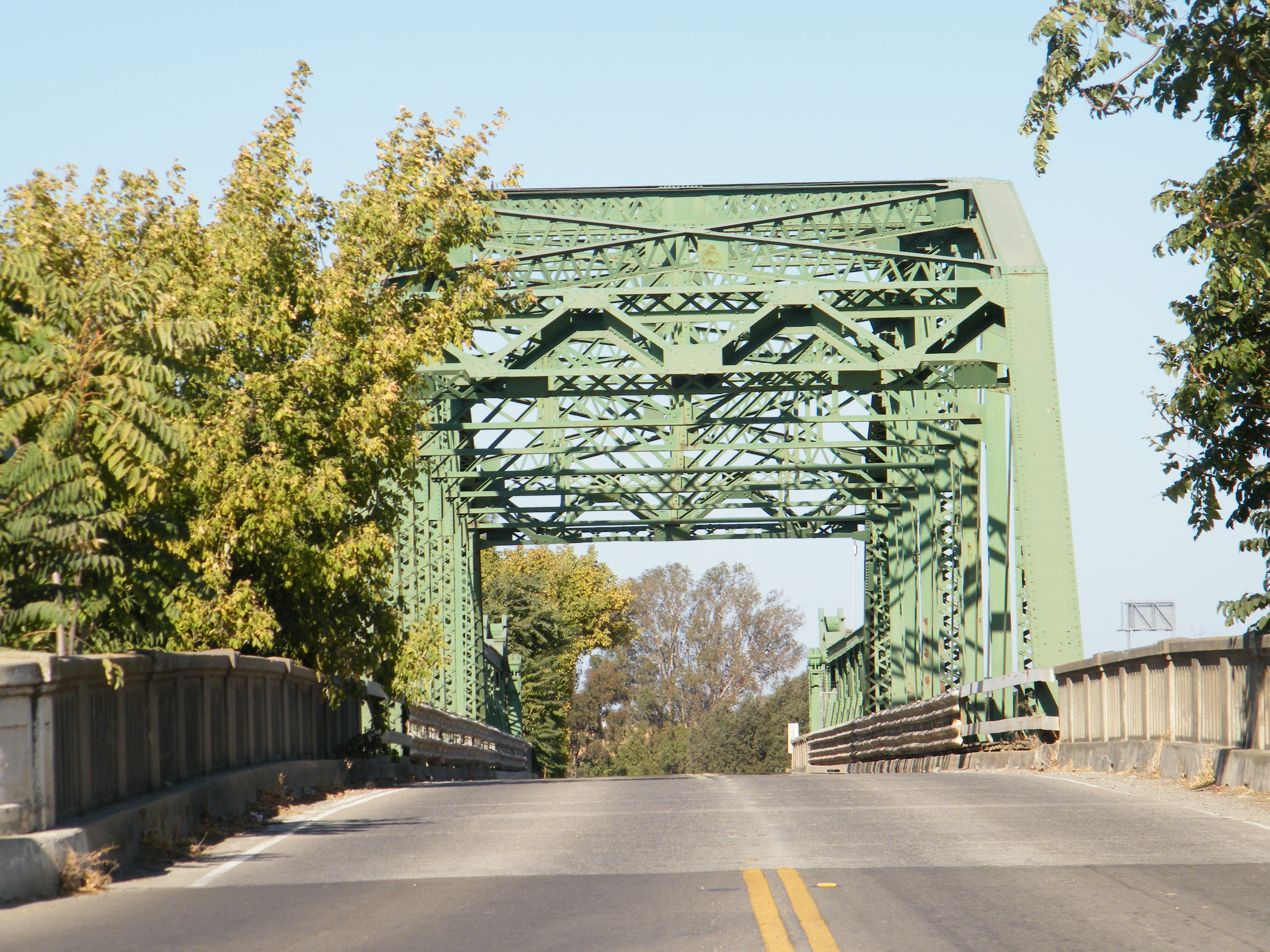
- San Joaquin River road bridge at Mossdale Crossing in Lathrop
- Interactive map of Lathrop, California
- Location within California Location within the United States
- Coordinates: 37°49′1″N 121°17′19″W
- Country: United States
- State: California
- County: San Joaquin
- Incorporated: July 1, 1989

Government
  - Mayor: Paul Akinjo
  - California's 5th State Senate district: Jerry McNerney (D)
  - California's 9th State Assembly district: Heath Flora (R)
  - California's 13th congressional district: Adam Gray (D)
  - City manager: Stephen Salvatore

Area
  - Total: 21.01 sq mi (54.41 km^{2})
  - Land: 19.83 sq mi (51.35 km^{2})
  - Water: 1.18 sq mi (3.06 km^{2}) 5.62%
- Elevation: 23 ft (7 m)

Population (2020)
  - Total: 28,701
  - Density: 1,448/sq mi (558.9/km^{2})
- Time zone: UTC−08:00 (PST)
  - Summer (DST): UTC−07:00 (PDT)
- ZIP Code: 95330
- Area code: 209
- FIPS code: 06-40704
- GNIS feature ID: 1658948
- Website: www.ci.lathrop.ca.us

Lathrop (/ˈleɪθrəp/, LAY-thrəp) is a city located 10 miles (16 km) south of Stockton in San Joaquin County, California, United States. The 2020 census reported that Lathrop's population was 28,701. The city is located in Northern California at the intersection of Interstate 5 and California State Route 120, in the San Joaquin Valley.

== History ==
Lathrop was developed around railroad interests. The town was founded around 1868 when the first transcontinental railroad was extended to the area after a dispute between the president of the Central Pacific Railroad, Leland Stanford, and the City of Stockton. The two parties had struck a right-of-way agreement to build a railroad through Stockton, but when city officials delayed in deciding where the alignment should go, Stanford decided to instead build the railroad around Stockton and set up a new town along the route.

The new town was platted into 16 subdivisions around the site of a train depot named Wilson's Station at a wye built for switching train cars. A merchant store and schoolhouse were built soon after. In 1869, the area was renamed in honor of the family of Leland Stanford's wife, Jane Stanford (née Lathrop), and her brother, Charles Lathrop, who worked for Leland as an engineer at Central Pacific.

On September 6, 1869, four months after the golden spike ceremony at Promontory Summit, the San Joaquin River Bridge at Mossdale in Lathrop was finished by Western Pacific. This completed the last westbound link of the transcontinental railroad to the Pacific coast, with the first through train arriving that evening, making Lathrop an important division point and rail stop. In 1871, a post office opened in Lathrop. That same year, the railroad built a hotel for $50,000 called Hotel Lathrop, said to be one of the largest in the state of California at the time.

Throughout the 1870s, Lathrop was an important rail stop for the transcontinental railroad. This generated steady growth in the area, with the population increasing to about 600 by 1879.

In February 1886, the railroad's hotel caught fire and was destroyed. That, along with the railroad deciding to move its roundhouse and machine shops to nearby Tracy, California around the same time, caused Lathrop to enter into a period of economic and population decline until World War I.

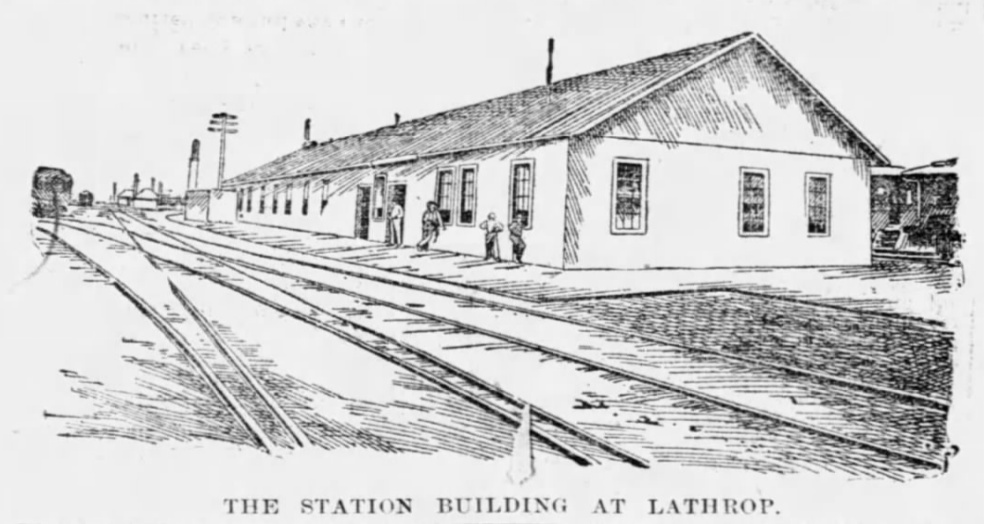
Lathrop railroad station (1889) where former California Chief Justice David Terry assaulted US Supreme Court Justice Stephen Field and was shot by Field's bodyguard

On August 14, 1889, former Chief Justice of California David S. Terry assaulted United States Supreme Court Justice Stephen J. Field, at the train station in Lathrop. Field's bodyguard, United States Marshal David Neagle (formerly assigned to Tombstone, Arizona), shot and killed Terry. The events led to the United States Supreme Court decision In re Neagle, which granted immunity from state prosecution to federal officers acting within the scope of their federal authority.

During the 1940s, Lathrop expanded from its original townsite to an area of about five square miles. Following World War II, housing tracts were built and several large industrial employers moved there. Residential growth slowed during the 1950s and 1960s, but picked up again in the subsequent decades, doubling in population to 2,137 in 1970 and reaching 6,841 by 1990.

Lathrop was incorporated in 1989, and its first General Plan adopted in 1991.

== Geography ==
The San Joaquin River cuts through the middle of Lathrop, the Old River (California) on the west side, and has elevation of 20 feet (7 m).

Neighboring cities and towns include Stockton, Manteca, Ripon, French Camp, and Tracy.

According to the United States Census Bureau, the city covers an area of 21.0 square miles (54.4 km^{2}) of which 1.2 square miles (3.1 km^{2}) (5.62%) is covered by water.

== Demographics ==
Historical population
Census	Pop.	Note	%±
1890	577		—
1960	1,123		—
1970	2,137		90.3%
1980	3,717		73.9%
1990	6,841		84.0%
2000	10,445		52.7%
2010	18,023		72.6%
2020	28,701		59.2%
2025 (est.)	42,783	▲	49.1%
U.S. Decennial Census

=== 2020 census ===
As of the 2020 census, Lathrop had a population of 28,701 and a population density of 1,447.6 inhabitants per square mile (558.9/km^{2}). The median age was 34.0 years. The age distribution was 28.8% under the age of 18, 9.4% aged 18 to 24, 28.4% aged 25 to 44, 23.5% aged 45 to 64, and 9.7% who were 65 years of age or older. For every 100 females, there were 97.8 males, and for every 100 females age 18 and over, there were 96.3 males age 18 and over.

Racial composition as of the 2020 census
Race	Number	Percent
White	6,958	24.2%
Black or African American	2,178	7.6%
American Indian and Alaska Native	352	1.2%
Asian	8,691	30.3%
Native Hawaiian and Other Pacific Islander	382	1.3%
Some other race	6,104	21.3%
Two or more races	4,036	14.1%
Hispanic or Latino (of any race)	11,389	39.7%

The census reported that 99.9% of the population lived in households, 0.1% lived in non-institutionalized group quarters, and no one was institutionalized. In addition, 99.0% of residents lived in urban areas, while 1.0% lived in rural areas.

There were 7,571 households, of which 54.9% had children under the age of 18 living in them. Of all households, 61.6% were married-couple households, 6.5% were cohabiting couple households, 17.6% were households with a female householder and no spouse or partner present, and 14.3% were households with a male householder and no spouse or partner present. About 8.9% of all households were made up of individuals, and 3.0% had someone living alone who was 65 years of age or older. The average household size was 3.79. There were 6,599 families (87.2% of all households).

There were 7,802 housing units at an average density of 393.5 units per square mile (151.9 units/km^{2}), of which 7,571 (97.0%) were occupied and 3.0% were vacant. Of occupied units, 80.2% were owner-occupied and 19.8% were occupied by renters. The homeowner vacancy rate was 1.1%, and the rental vacancy rate was 2.5%.

=== 2023 estimate ===
In 2023, the US Census Bureau estimated that the median household income was $118,605, and the per capita income was $36,037. About 7.3% of families and 8.6% of the population were below the poverty line.

=== 2010 census ===
The 2010 United States census reported that Lathrop had a population of 18,023. The population density was 782.5 inhabitants per square mile (302.1/km^{2}). The racial makeup of Lathrop was 7,410 (41.1%) White, 1,300 (7.2%) African American, 231 (1.3%) Native American, 3,968 (22.0%) Asian (mostly Filipino), 144 (0.8%) Pacific Islander, 3,735 (20.7%) from other races, and 1,235 (6.9%) from two or more races. Hispanics or Latinos of any race were 7,674 persons (42.6%).

The census reported that 18,011 people (99.9% of the population) lived in households, 6 (<0.1%) lived in noninstitutionalized group quarters, and 6 (<0.1%) were institutionalized.

Of the 4,782 households, 2,738 (57.3%) had children under 18 living in them, 2,973 (62.2%) were opposite-sex married couples living together, 719 (15.0%) had a female householder with no husband present, 379 (7.9%) had a male householder with no wife present; 376 (7.9%) were unmarried opposite-sex partnerships, and 35 (0.7%) same-sex married couples or partnerships. About 10.1% of households were made up of individuals, and 2.7% had someone living alone who was 65 or older. The average household size was 3.77. The average family size was 3.99.

The age distribution was 5,819 people (32.3%) under 18, 1,814 people (10.1%) 18 to 24, 5,324 people (29.5%) 25 to 44, 3,897 people (21.6%) 45 to 64, and 1,169 people (6.5%) who were 65 or older. The median age was 30.5 years. For every 100 females, there were 99.7 males. For every 100 females 18 and over, there were 97.7 males.

The 5,261 housing units had an average density of 228.4/sq mi (88.2/km^{2}), of which 3,604 (75.4%) were owner-occupied, and 1,178 (24.6%) were occupied by renters. The homeowner vacancy rate was 3.7%; the rental vacancy rate was 5.5%, and 13,191 people (73.2% of the population) lived in owner-occupied housing units with 4,820 people (26.7%) in rental housing units.

== Economy ==
According to the city's 2022 Comprehensive Annual Financial Report, the top 10 employers in the city are:

#	Employer	# of employees
1	Tesla, Inc.	3,000
2	United Parcel Service	1,500
3	Pflug Packaging	450
4	Army & Air Force Exchange Service	400
5	Wayfair	400
6	Super Store Industries	375
7	California Natural Products	375
8	Simwon America	336
9	Manteca Unified School District	333
10	CBC Steel Buildings	203

=== Economic potential ===
The City of Lathrop has a seven-mile (11 km) radius population of 105,893 with an average household income of $63,072.

Lathrop is centered between the Stockton and Tracy submarkets – both within a 20-mile (32 km) radius.

In April 2014, electric car maker Tesla announced that it would be opening a warehouse in Lathrop, in a 430,000 sq ft (40,000 m^{2}) building that was once a Chrysler distribution center. The company also operates a factory assembling Tesla Megapack lithium-ion battery containers in the former J.C. Penney distribution center, and has become Lathrop's largest employer.

=== Large developments ===
Mossdale Village, located west of I-5 and east of the San Joaquin River, consists of 2375 units and has historical significance. The development abuts, and is named after, the site of the San Joaquin Railroad Bridge at Mossdale crossing, which was the final link to the Pacific coast for the Transcontinental Railroad, actually completed on September 6, 1869, four months after the official celebration and driving of the golden spike at Promontory Utah. California State Historical Marker number 781-7 is at Mossdale Crossing Park.

Stanford Crossing, located west of the I-5 freeway and east of the San Joaquin River, is a master planned community consisting of 2167 lots. It was conceived as part of the Central Lathrop Specific Plan (CLSP), adopted on November 9, 2004, to develop “a vibrant and livable community” across approximately 1,521 acres (616 ha) in Central Lathrop. The community’s name pays homage to Leland Stanford, and his role in the completion of the transcontinental railroad at nearby Mossdale Crossing. A 4.13-acre park (1.67 ha) developed in the neighborhood was also subsequently named Leland and Jane Stanford Park, after the family who helped found Lathrop.

In addition to the residential, parks and other community allotments, the CLSP also designated land usage near to Stanford Crossing for what became the Lathrop Generations Center and Lathrop High School.

== Government ==
=== Local government ===
The Mayor of Lathrop is Paul Akinjo. The current city council consists of Mayor Paul Akinjo, Vice-Mayor Jennifer Torres-O'Callaghan, Councilmember Diane Lazard, Councilmember Minnie Diallo, and Councilmember Steve Dresser.

=== County, state, and federal representation ===
In the San Joaquin County Board of Supervisors, Lathrop is in the 3rd district, which is represented by Sonny Dhaliwal.

In the United States House of Representatives, Lathrop is in California's 13th congressional district, represented by Democrat Adam Gray.

In the California State Legislature, Lathrop is in the 5th senatorial district, represented by Democrat Jerry McNerney, and California's 9th State Assembly district, represented by Republican Heath Flora.

California is represented by US Senators Alex Padilla and Adam Schiff, both Democrats.

== Education ==
Eastern portions of Lathrop are in the Manteca Unified School District. Western portions are in the Banta Unified School District. The western part includes the River Islands development on the west side of Interstate 5.

Manteca Unified School District serves the Lathrop community with three elementary schools, Joseph Widmer Jr, Lathrop School, and Mossdale School. Residents of the River Islands development are served by three public chartered elementary schools under Banta Unified School District.

Banta USD was formerly Banta Elementary School District. It became a unified school district (that is, began to cover up to grade 12) in 2021. Prior to Banta USD's unification, Tracy Unified School District was the high school district for the area. Students living in the boundary of Banta ESD previously attended Merrill F. West High School.

Lathrop High School, under Manteca Unified School District, was the first secondary school in Lathrop; it opened in 2008. Lathrop High features the Spartan band which has performed at Cal Band Day at Cal Berkeley. The Spartan music program includes concert band, symphonic band, marching band, and drum line.

A second high school, River Islands High School, opened in 2024 as part of the Banta Unified School District.

== Transportation ==
The City of Lathrop is served by the San Joaquin Regional Transit District and the Altamont Corridor Express commuter rail train at Lathrop/Manteca station.

== Notable people ==
- Travian Sousa (born 2001), soccer player

== Sister cities ==
- Bacarra, Ilocos Norte, Philippines
