= Karen Jankowski =

- Nationality: American

Karen Jankowski is an American rally team owner, driver & co-driver from Manteca, California. She began her racing career in 2006, and is most closely associated with David Sterckx and Doug Shepherd, with whom she won the Rally America USA championships in 2008 and 2013.

Starting out volunteering for a rally team as their team manager, Jankowski moved to co-driving in 2006 at the Oregon Trail Rally in Portland, Oregon. Since 2006, she has competed throughout North America in the NASA, Rally America, Canadian Rally, and Targa events in Canada and Mexico. She has co-driven for Joseph Burke, Jeff Seehorn, Doug Shepherd, Frank Sprongl, Lauchlin O' Sullivan, and David Sterckx.

Jankowski has competed in a total of 140 events, with 6 wins and 6 USA National Class Championships. She continues to race in North America.
