= FIFA eligibility rules =

Rules to determine player participation

In association football, the FIFA eligibility rules are the eligibility criteria established by FIFA, the sport's governing body, to facilitate the selection of representative teams for international competitions. Specifically, FIFA maintains and implements rules determining a player's eligibility to represent a particular national team in officially sanctioned international competitions and friendly matches.

Traditionally, athlete eligibility has been tied to legal nationality, allowing players with multiple nationalities to represent more than one country, especially after naturalisation. However, national teams are organised by national football associations, not all of which are affiliated with FIFA. Some countries, like the United Kingdom, are represented by constituent associations (England, Wales, Scotland, and Northern Ireland), while other associations represent regions not typically recognised as independent countries, such as dependent territories (e.g., Gibraltar), autonomous states or territories (Faroe Islands), or even independent countries with disputed recognition (Kosovo and Palestine). Not all countries have a FIFA-affiliated association.

In 2004, FIFA introduced a rule requiring players to demonstrate a "clear connection" to any country they wish to represent, in response to the Qatar Football Association offering incentives to uncapped players with no links to the country to play for their national team. FIFA has the authority to overturn results of international matches featuring ineligible players. In January 2021, FIFA revamped the eligibility system, allowing players tied to one nationality the option to switch allegiance to another nation.

Fielding ineligible players can lead to sanctions, including the overturning of match results.

== History ==
Historically, it was possible for players to play for different national teams. For example, Alfredo Di Stéfano played for Argentina (1947) and Spain (1957–61).

Di Stefano's Real Madrid teammate Ferenc Puskás also played for Spain after amassing 85 caps for Hungary earlier in his career. A third high-profile instance of a player switching international football nationalities is José Altafini, who played for Brazil in the 1958 FIFA World Cup and for Italy in the subsequent 1962 FIFA World Cup.

Other 20th-century examples of players representing two or three separate countries are:

- Ernst Wilimowski – (Poland and Germany)
- Joe Gaetjens – (United States and Haiti)
- László Kubala – (Czechoslovakia, Hungary and Spain)
- Raimundo Orsi – (Argentina and Italy)
- Luis Monti – (Argentina and Italy; the only person who played in two World Cup final matches for two different teams)
- José Santamaría – (Uruguay and Spain)
- Alberto Spencer – (Ecuador and Uruguay)
- Paulino Alcántara – (Philippines and Spain)

This does not include the hundreds of players whose teams were affected by changes to geopolitical borders e.g. East Germany/Germany, Soviet Union/Ukraine, Yugoslavia/Croatia.

Furthermore, some international players have played for another FIFA-recognised country in unofficial international matches, i.e. fixtures not recognised by FIFA as full internationals. This category includes:

- Daniel Brailovsky, who played for Uruguay youth teams, was featured in camps for Argentina and years later officially represented Israel.
- Debatik Curri, an Albania international, played in a friendly for Kosovo in 2014, during the period when they were allowed to play against full national teams, but were not members of the confederations. He later played again competitively for Albania. Other players in that match subsequently switched formally from Albania to Kosovo when they began to play official matches.
- Barry Hayles, the English-born forward, played for the Cayman Islands against D.C. United before representing Jamaica at full international level.
- England international Gordon Hodgson, who has an amateur cap for South Africa.
- the aforementioned Di Stefano, who also has four caps for Colombia. These caps are not officially recognised due to a dispute between FIFA and the Colombian Football Federation at the time.
- Michel Platini (France) who later (in 1988) played 21 minutes in a friendly for Kuwait on invitation by the Kuwaiti Emir.

== Modern changes ==
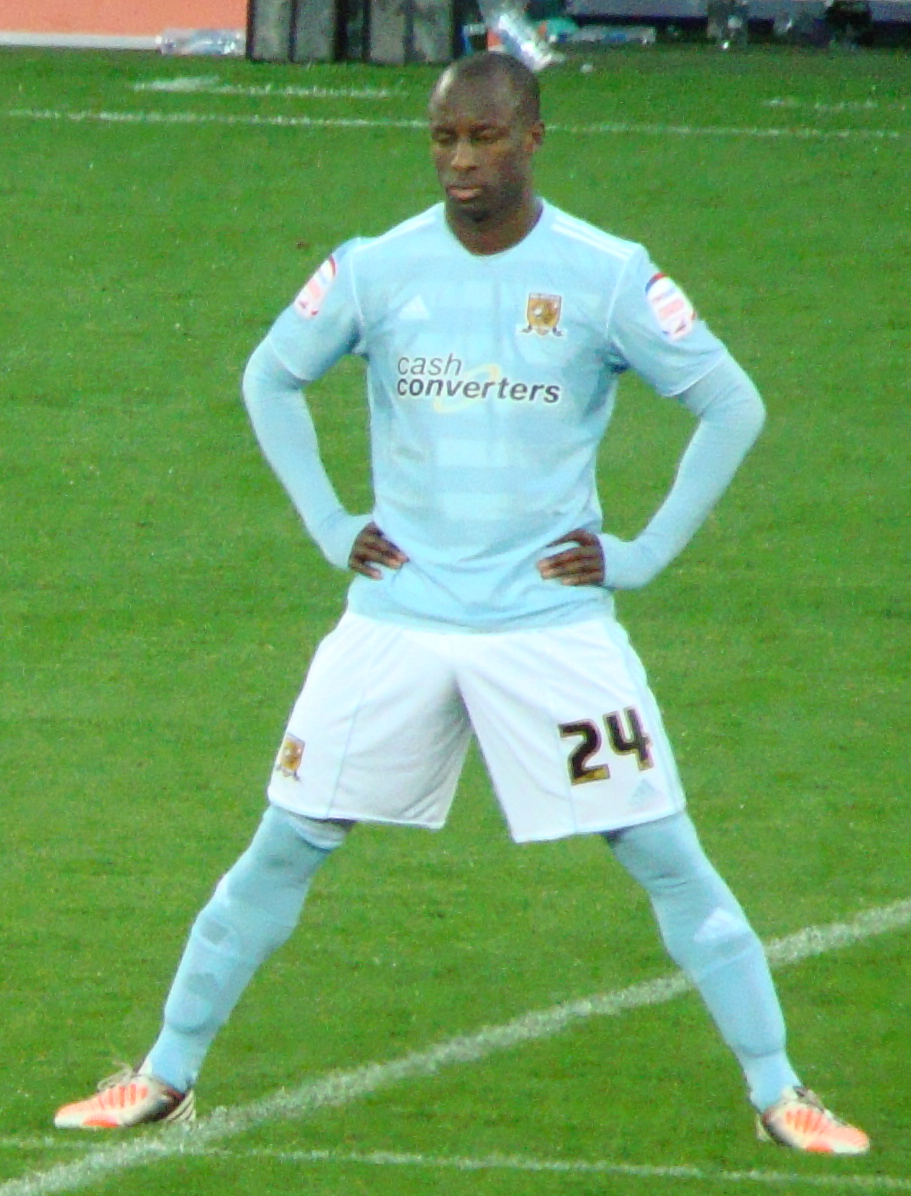
Sone Aluko originally represented England at youth international level, before representing Nigeria at senior international level

In January 2004, a new ruling came into effect that permitted a player to represent one country at youth international level and another at senior international level, provided that the player applied before their 21st birthday. The first player to do so was Antar Yahia, who played for the France under-18s before representing Algeria in qualifiers for the 2004 Olympic Games. More recent examples include Sone Aluko, who has caps for the England under-19s and Nigeria, and Andrew Driver, a former England under-21 representative who is committed to the Scotland national team.

In March 2004, FIFA amended its wider policy on international eligibility. This was reported to be in response to a growing trend in some countries, such as Qatar and Togo, to naturalise players born and raised elsewhere who have no apparent ancestral links to their new country of citizenship. An emergency FIFA committee ruling judged that players must be able to demonstrate a "clear connection" to a country that they had not been born in but wished to represent. This ruling explicitly stated that, in such scenarios, the player must have at least one parent or grandparent who was born in that country, or the player must have been resident in that country for at least two years.

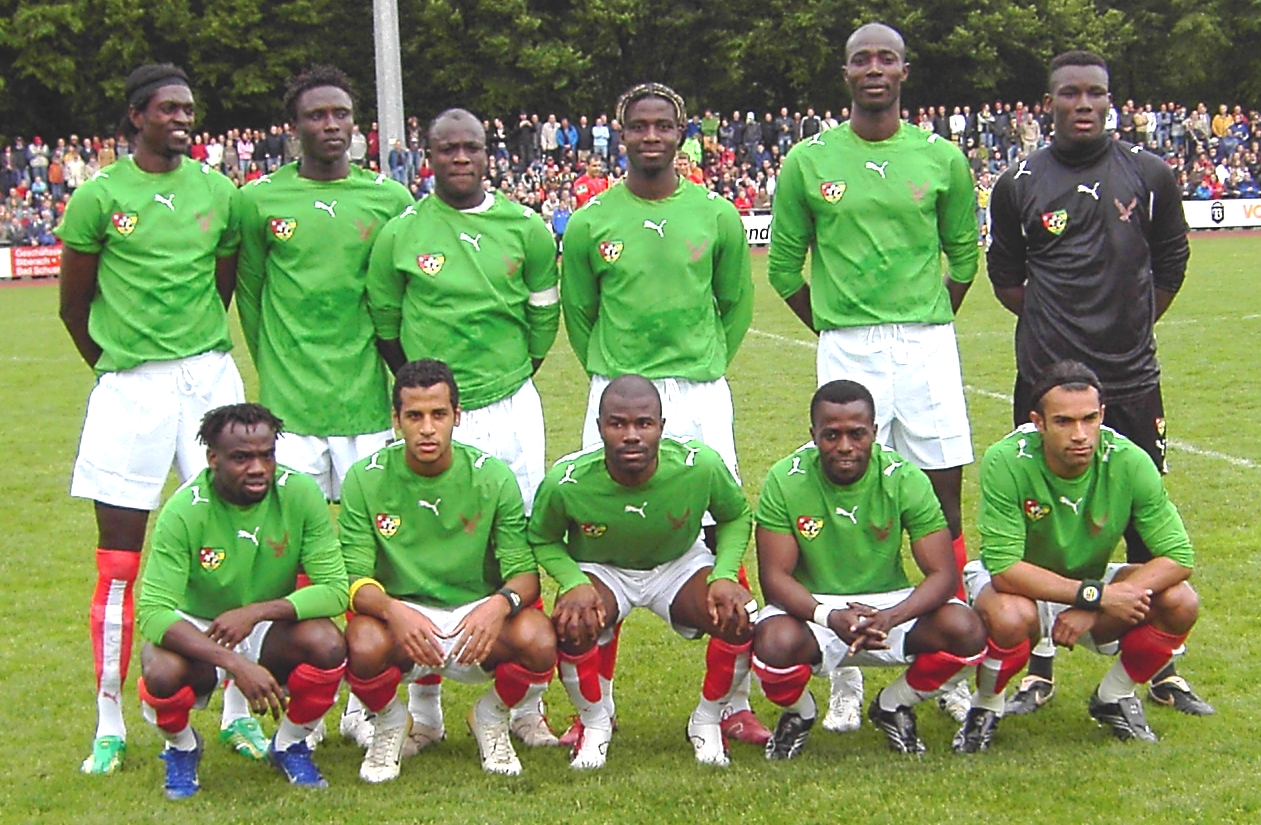
Togo's registration of naturalised players born and raised in Brazil reportedly influenced FIFA's decision to amend eligibility rules in 2004.

In November 2007, FIFA President Sepp Blatter told the BBC: "If we don't stop this farce, if we don't take care about the invaders from Brazil towards Europe, Asia and Africa then, in the 2014 or the 2018 World Cup, out of the 32 teams you will have 16 full of Brazilian players."

The residency requirement for players lacking birth or ancestral connections with a specific country was extended from two to five years in May 2008 at FIFA's Congress as part of Blatter's efforts to preserve the integrity of competitions involving national teams.

The relevant current FIFA statute, Article 7: Acquisition of a new nationality, states:

Any player who refers to art. 5 par. 1 (Note: This states : "Any person holding a permanent nationality that is not dependent on residence in a certain country is eligible to play for the representative teams of the association of that country") to assume a new nationality and who has not played international football [in a match (either in full or in part) in an official competition of any category or any type of football] shall be eligible to play for the new representative team only if he fulfils one of the following conditions:
a) He was born on the territory of the relevant association;
b) His biological mother or biological father was born on the territory of the relevant association;
c) His grandmother or grandfather was born on the territory of the relevant association;
d) He has lived continuously for at least five years after reaching the age of 18 on the territory of the relevant association.

— FIFA.com

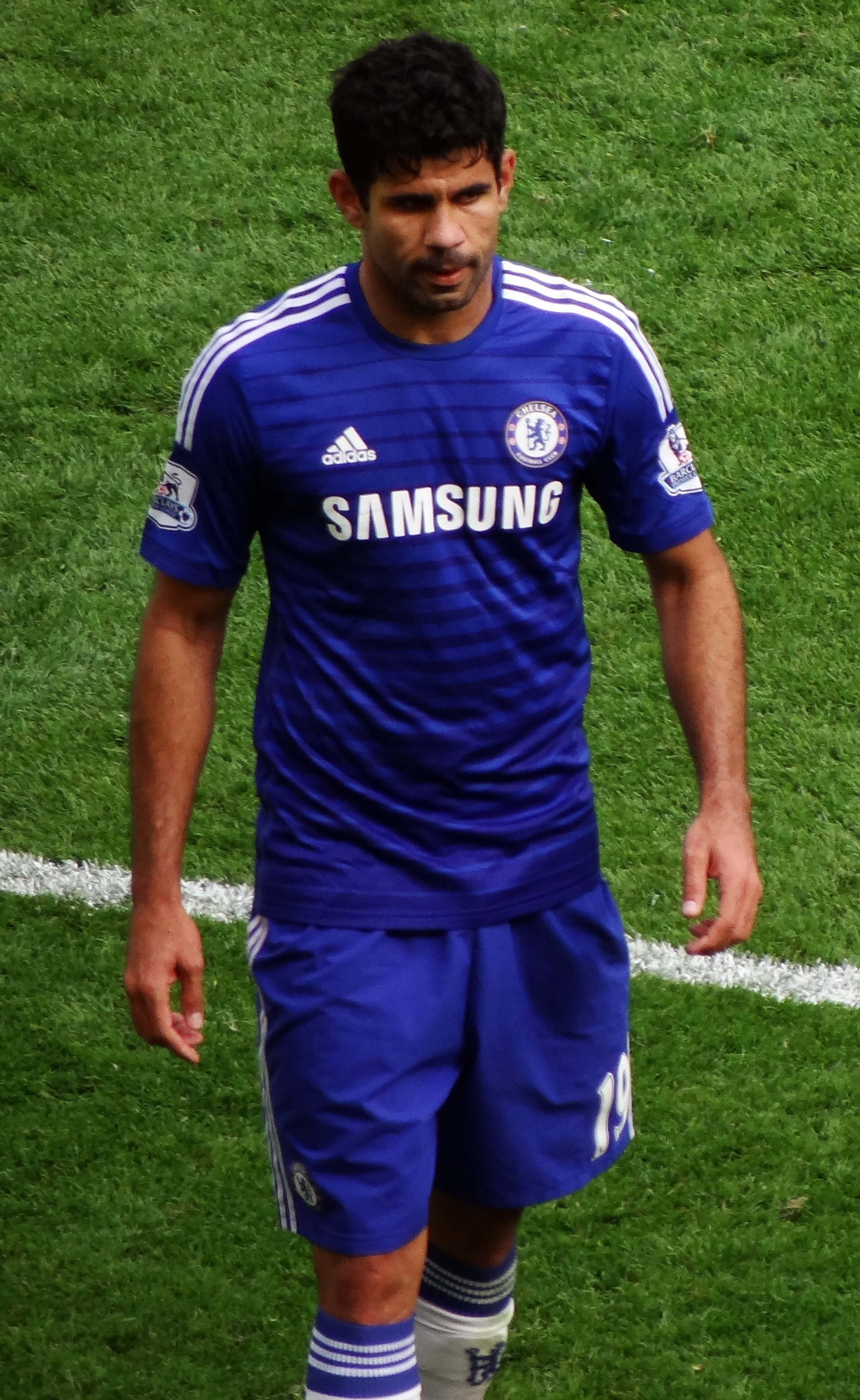
Diego Costa played two friendlies for Brazil in 2013, before switching allegiances to Spain

Under the criteria generally, it is possible for a player to have a choice of representing several national teams. It is not uncommon for national team managers and scouts to attempt to persuade players to change their FIFA nationality; in June 2011, for example, Scotland manager Craig Levein confirmed that his colleagues had started a dialogue with United States under-17 international Jack McBean in an attempt to persuade him to represent Scotland in the future. Gareth Bale was asked about a possibility to play for England, being of English descent through his grandmother, but ultimately opted to represent Wales, his country of birth.

In June 2009, FIFA Congress passed a motion that removed the age limit for players who had already played for a country's national team at youth level to change national associations. This ruling features in Article 18 of the Regulations Governing the Application of the FIFA Statutes.

Friendly match appearances do not commit a player to one country; Jermaine Jones played several friendlies for Germany but made his debut for the United States in 2010. Thiago Motta had three caps for Brazil in matches deemed friendlies for Brazil (participation in the CONCACAF Gold Cup as a non-conference guest team) and went on to represent Italy for five years. Diego Costa represented Brazil in two friendlies before switching his allegiances to Spain in 2013, going on to represent the latter at the 2014 and 2018 FIFA World Cups. Apostolos Giannou represented Greece in a friendly in 2015, before switching his allegiances to Australia, making his debut for the latter in March 2016. A FIFA Player's Status Committee is responsible for making such judgements.

Under FIFA rules, eligibility by descent is strictly limited to biological descent; adoption is not considered at all. By contrast, World Rugby, the governing body for rugby union, specifies that if a player has been legally adopted under the laws of the relevant country, descent is traced through the adoptive parent(s). This replacement also applies in cases where the player was not adopted, but one or both biological parents were themselves adopted.

In September 2020, the 70th edition of the FIFA Congress approved a rule change that now allows players to switch 3 years later if they have played no more than three competitive matches at senior level prior to them turning 21 including no appearances in FIFA World Cup finals matches or continental finals (e.g. the UEFA European Championship). However, appearing in a tournament qualifier would not prohibit a change of eligibility.

Furthermore, players who played for their home country but not at senior level, who were under 21 at the time and have since lived in a new country for five years or more can apply for the right to represent their new place of residence. This also applies to players that began living on the territory before the age of 10 for at least three years. FIFA also facilitates a reversal of a change request in certain specific circumstances.

=== Penalties for playing ineligible players ===
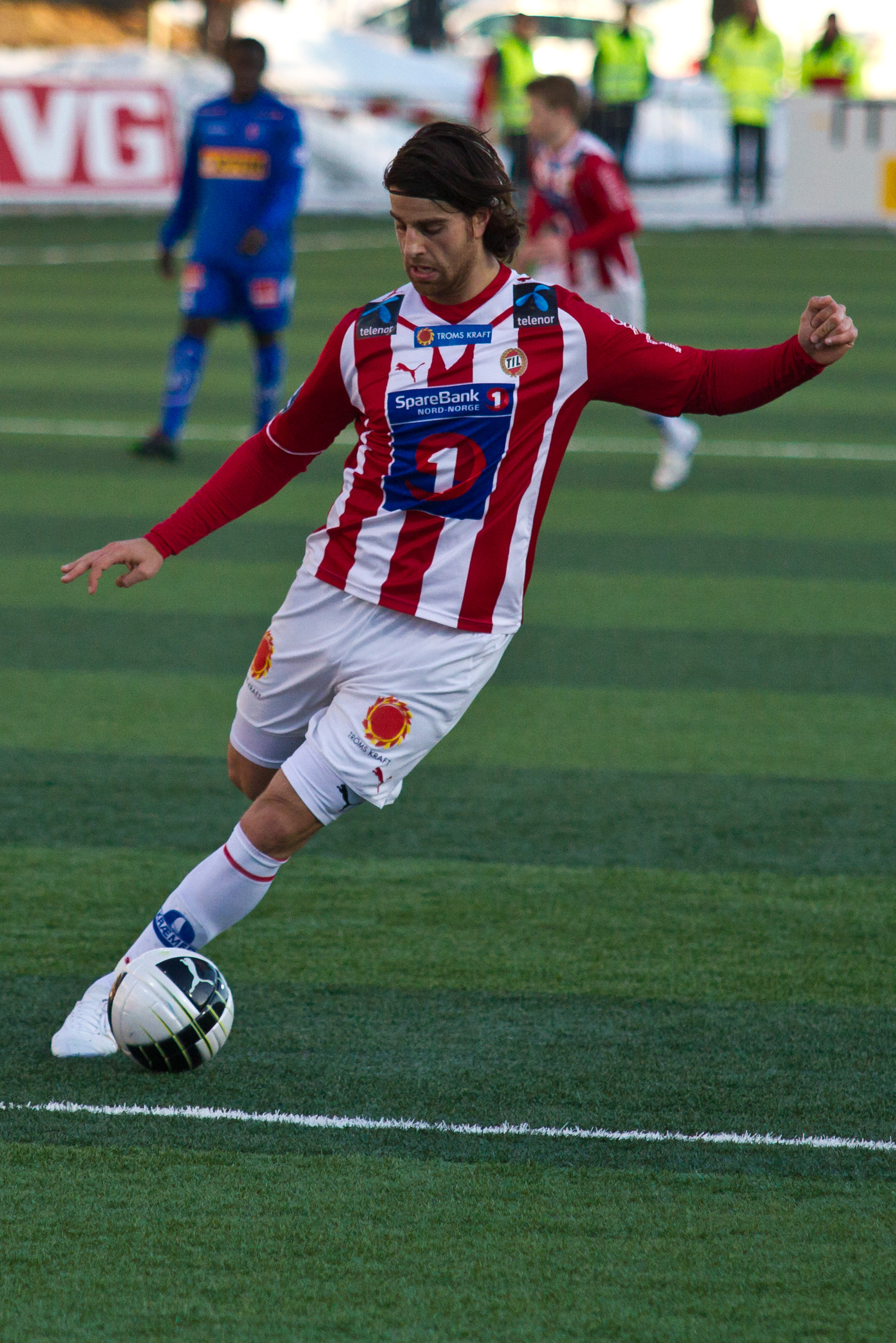
Syria were expelled from the 2014 FIFA World Cup qualification process by FIFA in 2011, for fielding George Mourad in a senior qualification match against Tajikistan

FIFA takes punitive action against teams that field ineligible players. In August 2011, FIFA expelled Syria from the 2014 FIFA World Cup qualification process following the appearance of George Mourad in a senior qualification match against Tajikistan. Mourad had made friendly match appearances for Sweden earlier in his career, but had not requested permission from FIFA to change national associations before playing for Syria.

At the men's football tournament at the 2015 Pacific Games, which also determines the 2016 Oceania Olympic Football qualifier, Deklan Wynne, who was born in South Africa and raised in New Zealand from early childhood, played in the semi-final for New Zealand, who won the match 3–0. After the game, a protest was lodged by their opponents Vanuatu, on the basis that Wynne was not an eligible player. As Wynne was 20 years old, it was impossible for him to have already lived in New Zealand for five years after the age of 18. This protest was upheld by the Oceania Football Confederation, resulting in New Zealand being disqualified and Vanuatu taking their place in the final.

During the 2018 World Cup qualifiers Bolivia fielded Paraguayan‑born Nelson David Cabrera (who had also played for Paraguay) in two matches—against Peru on 1 September 2016 (the match was won 2–0 by Bolivia) and against Chile on 6 September 2016 (the match finished in a scoreless draw). Cabrera was subsequently found to be ineligible by FIFA, which resulted in the awarding of 3–0 wins for Bolivia's opponents, affecting the final standings in the table and contributing to Peru's qualification for the World Cup at the expense of Chile.

== FIFA members sharing a legal nationality ==
There are 25 FIFA member associations that share a common nationality with at least one other FIFA member association.

In these instances, under Article 6.1 of the Regulations Governing the Applications of Statutes, FIFA Statutes (nationality entitling players to represent more than one association), if a player was not born in the member associations' territory and does not have a parent or grandparent that was born in the territory, the player is able to represent another member association that shares the same common nationality after five years residency.

Legal nationalities corresponding to multiple FIFA national teams
Legal nationality	FIFA national teams		
Legal nationality	Sovereign	Sovereign part	Dependency
China	China	(Note: FIFA also recognises the Chinese Taipei national football team; the political status of Taiwan is controversial.)	Hong Kong; Macau
Denmark	Denmark		Faroe Islands
France	France		New Caledonia; Tahiti
Netherlands	(Note: The Kingdom of the Netherlands comprises Aruba, Curaçao, Netherlands, and Sint Maarten. A Sint Maarten national football team is organised by the Sint Maarten Football Federation which is an associate member of CONCACAF but not a FIFA member.)	Aruba; Curaçao; Netherlands	
New Zealand	New Zealand		Cook Islands
United Kingdom	Great Britain (Note: The United Kingdom, under the name of 'Great Britain', only has official status within FIFA when being represented at the Olympic Games.)	England; Northern Ireland; Scotland; Wales (Note: The 'Four British Associations' have decided that they do not want to offer eligibility to represent their national team after two years residency to otherwise-ineligible British players. (see Home nations 2009 agreement))	Anguilla; Bermuda; British Virgin Islands; Cayman Islands; Gibraltar; Montserrat; Turks and Caicos Islands
United States	United States		American Samoa; Guam; Puerto Rico; U.S. Virgin Islands

== Home nations agreement ==
There has been a series of additional agreements between national football associations of the United Kingdom (The Football Association, the Scottish Football Association, the Football Association of Wales and the Irish Football Association), the latest of which came in 2010 and was ratified by FIFA.

In 1990, Nigel Spackman wanted to be called up by Scotland during his time at Rangers F.C. through his Scottish grandfather. However at the time, the four British Associations did not choose to accept players without parents pertaining to the nation. The Herald reported that "until recently that would have been enough to give him qualification to play for Scotland. But under an agreement by the four home associations it is not enough any more."

=== Foreign-born British nationals ===
The agreement is often erroneously thought to be a response to cases similar to Maik Taylor, who was born in Germany to an English father and chose to represent Northern Ireland at international level despite having no ties to the nation. Taylor was called up to Northern Ireland in 1998, five years after the 1993 (gentlemen's) agreement was in place. The agreement was not applied when Taylor was called up by the IFA, possibly because in his case, neither the FA, SFA nor FAW was interested in capping him, unlike e.g. David Johnson (below) and so raised no objection.

Taylor was eligible to play for Northern Ireland due to FIFA regulations allowing him to. The relevant statute of the time read: "Any player who is a naturalised citizen of a country in virtue of that country's laws shall be eligible to play for a national or representative team of that country." As there is no United Kingdom national team, he was eligible to choose a "representative team of the country" and opted for Northern Ireland. Eric Young (born in Singapore) and Pat Van Den Hauwe (born in Belgium) had both previously opted for Wales under the same rules in 1985 and 1990 respectively, although both grew up in England; Australian Tony Dorigo had been denied the chance to play for his birth nation by his club manager at Aston Villa due to the travelling distances and low standards of opposition, and successfully obtained citizenship in 1986 in order to play for England – but had no relevant British ancestry and could have represented any of the home nations. Players in the same situation today would only be allowed to represent the territory of their (grand)parent's birthplace as the clause has been amended to refer to the Football Association's "territory" and not "country".

=== 1993 agreement ===
The four associations met on 27 February 1993 at Hanbury Manor in Hertfordshire. The Scottish Football Association (SFA) released minutes from the meeting to the press.

On the occasion of the meeting of the International Football Association Board on 27 February 1993 the four British associations ratified the following agreement, which came into force on 1 February 1993, on the criteria which should determine the eligibility of the player to be selected for one of the national teams of the British associations:

1. His country of birth.
2. The country of birth of his natural mother or father.
3. The country of birth of his natural grandmother or grandfather.
4. Where the player, both natural parents, and both natural grandparents are born outside the UK, but the player is the holder of a current British passport, he may play for the country of his choice."

— Scottish Football Association

David Johnson was a Jamaican international who had played four games for the Caribbean nation; his most recent game was a friendly against United States on 9 September 1999. He had previously played for the England B team and had been an unused substitute for the England under-21s. In late September 1999, the Ipswich Town forward was called up by Wales (and withdrew from the squad due to injury) and later Scotland. The Welsh and Scottish FAs believed he was eligible to play for them. Johnson was a Jamaican immigrant who was raised by foster parents in England, and he believed he could choose which UK nation to represent; the (English) Football Association (FA) had advised the player's agent that the international change of allegiance could go ahead.

However, the SFA discovered that as he had an English mother, he was not able to represent any Home nation other than England as a result. The SFA had chosen to abide by the agreement; unlike the Irish Football Association (IFA), who in addition to courting David Johnson had capped Germany-born Maik Taylor the previous year. Taylor was in the same situation as Johnson: he was born outside of the UK with one English parent. The Herald reported that "It is important to highlight, that under the agreement signed by the four British associations, the UK passport clause is only operative in the event that the player, his natural mother and father and his natural grandparents, are all born outside the United Kingdom".

A Football Association of Wales (FAW) spokesman Cerri Stennett said that they were "extremely puzzled by this development" and they thought "he was eligible to play for any of the four home countries and that's why Lawrie McMenemy wanted him for Northern Ireland as well." Stennett stated that FIFA gave clearance to Johnson switch allegiance to Wales' national squad and "he was on the substitute's bench for a match."

Under Lawrie McMenemy's stewardship, Northern Ireland went through a phase of trying to call up players who had no links to a UK nation, Northern Ireland attempted to call up Germany-born Maik Taylor, Nigeria-born Dele Adebola and Jamaica-born David Johnson. McMenemy's successor Sammy McIlroy was not pleased with his predecessor's policy, upon being appointed as Northern Ireland manager he said: "It's farcical chasing players with absolutely no connection to our country."

Former FA executive David Davies confirmed that England had once considered calling up Italian Carlo Cudicini, Brazilian Edu and Frenchmen Steed Malbranque and Louis Saha during Sven-Göran Eriksson's time as England manager.

In February 2004, there was a lot of media speculation in Scotland about the possibility of Frenchman Didier Agathe and Italian Lorenzo Amoruso playing for Scotland. Berti Vogts, the German head coach of Scotland, appeared to be in favour of fielding the players. Scotland's playing captain Christian Dailly felt differently, telling the Daily Record newspaper that "I don't care if they call in Zinedine Zidane. I would rather lose with a team of Scots than win with a team of foreigners. This is not a club side we're talking about it's SCOTLAND...I know the players will definitely be against it".

Ahead of a meeting with the other home associations, SFA executive David Taylor urged caution ahead of calls to opt out of the agreement. He said "We have to watch it does not become a free-for-all with the home countries trying to get the best players available," "It goes to the heart of why we exist as a separate country and could force people into asking why we do not have a UK football team." On 1 March 2004, the four British associations voted to retain the agreement.

=== 2006 agreement ===
In January 2006, Northern Ireland manager Lawrie Sanchez had his hopes of bringing in players born outside Northern Ireland – but who held a British passport – dashed. Irish FA chiefs told Sanchez he could only select players who have a history with Northern Ireland. Sanchez spoke of his frustration with the rule: "I must stick by the British agreement which says that you shouldn't approach a player unless he has family ties with that particular country.

"It's frustrating but my job is to manage the Northern Ireland international team and theirs (the Irish FA) is to make policy.

"I must continue to work with the players I have and I'm very happy to do that.

The wording of the agreement was adjusted and published by FIFA in December 2006:

3. British associations

1. There is a specific agreement, stipulating the conditions to play for a national team, for the four British associations^{134}. Besides having British nationality, the player needs to fulfil at least one of the following conditions
  a) he was born on the territory of the relevant association;
  b) his biological mother or father was born on the territory of the relevant association;
  c) his grandmother or grandfather was born on the territory of the relevant association.
2. If a player has a British passport, but no territorial relationship as provided for in conditions a-c above, he can choose for which of the British associations he wants to play^{135}.

134 England, Wales, Scotland and Northern Ireland.
135 e.g. a player who was born on the Cayman Islands and holds British nationality

In October 2008, Spanish striker Nacho Novo said that he would apply for a British passport if it meant he'd become eligible to play for Scotland. The SFA stated that he would not be eligible as they would abide by the agreement.

=== 2009 agreement ===
The agreement was completely revised in 2009 following a rewrite of the FIFA statutes in 2008. The loophole regarding British players born abroad and selecting a national team had been closed and then reopened. The revised ruling also removed the possibility of ineligibility due to a foreign-born adopted player having no parental or grand-parental links to a nation, as it is based on where the player is educated before the age of 18.

==== Removal of residency clause ====
The home nations have agreed to remove a clause that enables players to gain eligibility for one of the eight national teams due to residency. The FIFA statutes state that "Associations sharing a common nationality may make an agreement under which item (d) of par. 1 of this article is deleted completely or amended to specify a longer time limit". The clause removed is:

(d) He has lived continuously on the territory of the relevant Association for at least two years

— FIFA Statutes (April 2016 edition)

If the home nations' associations had chosen not to remove or alter the 'd' clause and instead use the default FIFA statute clauses, players with a home nation nationality would be able to transfer to a club in another home nation and be eligible for that national team after a period of two years (providing they have not been capped or played in an official competition for a nation).

==== The education clause ====
In February 2009, the Scottish FA's Gordon Smith put forward a proposal that would allow players educated in the FA's territory who otherwise had no blood connections to the nation to become eligible to represent the nation. The rule was ratified by FIFA in October 2009.

In June 2010, FIFA approved a minor rewording of the criteria. The introduction of the new clause allows a player to gain eligibility for a British national team if he receives five years of education in the territory of the relevant association:

d) He has engaged in a minimum of five years education under the age of 18 within the territory of the relevant association.

— Home nations agreement

As a direct result of the clause change, England-born Andrew Driver became eligible to play for the Scotland national team in June 2012. Driver was initially only eligible to represent England's national team despite living in Scotland since the age of 11. Despite speculation, Driver was never called-up for Scotland. Andy Dorman, who had previously been ineligible for Wales despite living in Hawarden for most of life became eligible to represent Wales. He was called up in November 2009 and made his debut for Wales on 23 May 2010 against Montenegro at the Stadion kraj Bistrice.

The criteria for eligibility to represent a home nation is:

1. A Player who, under the terms of art. 5, is eligible to represent more than one Association on account of his nationality, may play in an international match for one of these Associations only if, in addition to having the relevant nationality, he fulfils at least one of the following conditions:
  a) He was born on the territory of the relevant Association;
  b) His biological mother or biological father was born on the territory of the relevant Association;
  c) One of his biological grandparents was born on the territory of the relevant Association;
  d) He has engaged in a minimum of five years education under the age of 18 within the territory of the relevant association.

— Home nations agreement

In July 2012, the Football Association of Wales confirmed that Swansea City F.C.'s Spanish defender Àngel Rangel is not eligible to represent Wales due to the agreement.

=== 2025 Football Association of Wales proposal ===
In February 2025, the Football Association of Wales expressed an interest in selecting English-born midfielder Matt Grimes for international duty, and proposed changes to the home nation agreement to allow this. Under the FAW's proposals, a player would become eligible to represent a home nation if he is registered as a player for at least 5 years with a club within the relevant territory. Under these rules, Grimes would become eligible as he was registered as a Swansea City player for 10 years from 2015 to 2025. Under the current agreement, Grimes is ineligible to represent Wales as he was not born in the territory, has no parents or grandparents born in the territory, and did not have at least 5 years of education before the age of 18 in the territory. The proposal would need the support of The Football Association, Scottish Football Association and Irish Football Association to pass.

== Northern Ireland ==
Players born in Northern Ireland, who have at least one parent with "settled status" in the UK are British citizens at birth but are also entitled to have Irish nationality which entitles them to be selected for the representative teams of the Irish Football Association (IFA - Northern Ireland) as well as of the Football Association of Ireland (FAI - Republic of Ireland).

Players otherwise eligible for Northern Ireland do not need a UK passport if they have an Irish passport. A 2006 FIFA decision to require a UK passport was reversed after a month of IFA protests, with intervention from Peter Hain, the Northern Ireland Secretary, and Dermot Ahern, the Republic's Minister for Foreign Affairs.

3. REGULATIONS GOVERNING THE STATUS AND TRANSFER OF PLAYERS

In this connection, two points were raised from the national associations of Belgium and Northern Ireland: (…)

b) Irish Football Association (Northern Ireland)

The Committee considered this association's statement that almost any player can obtain a Republic of Ireland passport in order to secure eligibility to play for this country.

The Committee discussed this very serious matter at length and had to come to the unfortunate conclusion that FIFA cannot interfere with the decisions taken by any country in the question of granting passports.

The only way that the national associations could prevent their nationals from being systematically granted passports by another country to enable them to play for its national teams would be to field them in an official match for one of their national representative teams, which would bind them to this particular association"

— FIFA Players Status Committee, 17 May 1994

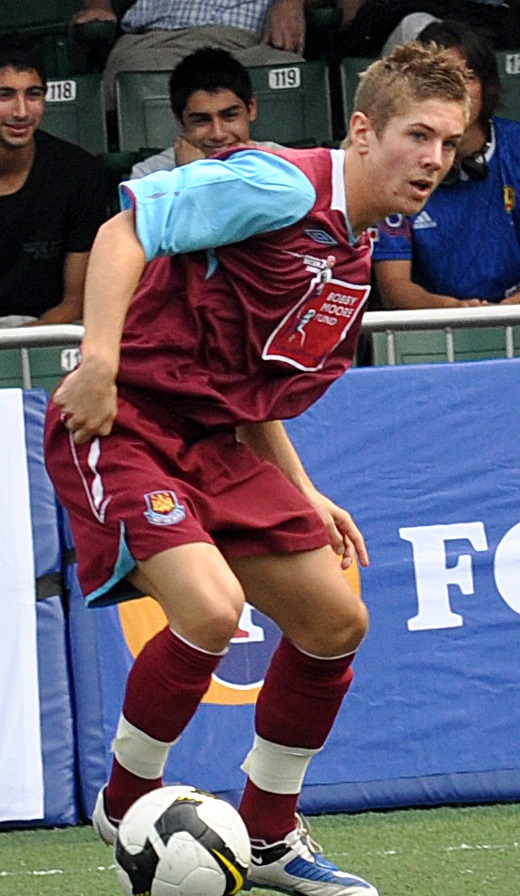
Daniel Kearns, who originally represented Northern Ireland at youth international level, chose to represent the Republic of Ireland, despite the fact he had not lived in the Republic of Ireland, and had no parents or grandparents from the Republic of Ireland, causing the Irish Football Association (IFA) to contest his decision.

In 2009, Daniel Kearns, who had represented Northern Ireland at youth level, declared for the Republic of Ireland. He was born in Belfast and his parents and grandparents were all from Northern Ireland. The IFA complained to FIFA that Kearns should be ineligible to represent the Republic of Ireland. FIFA responded: "As the FIFA Legal Committee understands it, the situation in Northern Ireland is such that all Northern Irish footballers could opt to play for your association teams, given that they have a birthright to an Irish passport. Evidently, the same is not applicable to the footballers of the Republic of Ireland, who do not have such a claim to a UK passport. This means that the [IFA] is exposed to a one-way situation, where players can choose to play for your association teams but the vice versa is not possible. This circumstance is rather unique and the FIFA Statutes and regulations do not provide for a solution".

In 2007, the FIFA Legal Committee invited the FAI voluntarily to confine itself to selecting for its association teams Northern Irish players who meet one of the following requirements: a) the player was born in the Republic of Ireland, b) his biological mother or father was born in the Republic of Ireland, c) his grandmother or grandfather was born in the Republic of Ireland, or d) he has lived continuously, for at least two years, in the Republic of Ireland.

FIFA also proposed an agreement between the Irish FA and the Football Association of Ireland which read:

(…) every player born on the territory of Northern Ireland, holding the UK nationality and being entitled to a passport of the Republic of Ireland or born on the territory of the Republic of Ireland and holding the Irish nationality could either play for the [FAI] or the [IFA], under the condition that all other relevant prerequisites pertaining to player's eligibility for a specific Association team are fulfilled

Whereas the FAI favoured the proposal, the IFA did not. Following the IFA's rejection, FIFA told the IFA that they had "concluded to adhere to the status quo".

In 2010, the IFA challenged the FAI in the Court of Arbitration for Sport (CAS). CAS concluded that the Irish FA "cannot reasonably claim that Mr Kearns' situation is to be equated with shared nationality as provided under Article 16 or that he requests a change of association from a starting point of a shared nationality. His situation, with respect to his Irish nationality, is not governed by Article 16, but by the general principle set forth by Article 15 par. 1 of the said Regulations. No further connection (as described by Article 16) has to exist between Mr Kearns and the Republic of Ireland to make him eligible to play for the FAI's representative team."

== See also ==
- Cap-tied
- FIFA association changes in 2026
- Grandfather rule
- Laws of the Game (association football)
- List of association footballers who have been capped for two senior national teams
- Sporting nationality
