= Lindbergh Educational Center =

Educational institution in Manteca, California

Coordinates: 37°48′05″N 121°12′48″W

Lindbergh Educational Center, also known as Manteca Adult School, located in Manteca, California, is part of the Manteca Unified School District. Thousands of its students have earned their high school diplomas or General Educational Development certificates. Its vocational training program "has earned numerous recognition for its effectiveness." In 1997, its Teen Parent Panel won the Action on Behalf of Children (ABC) Award.

== Program aspects ==
Lindbergh offers high school diploma classes, GED preparation, ESL courses, older adult programs, music, art, and fitness classes. The center also offers courses for students interested in learning or improving vocational skills ranging from cabinetmaking to medical transcription. First Aid and CPR "outside training conferences" are offered at the center through Valley Mountain Regional Center located in Stockton, California. It is a member of Cisco System's Cisco Networking Academy in the California Congressional District 11.

Generally, there is a fee for registering. Senior adults and students taking classes for high school credit are given a discount.

Lindbergh Educational Center is housed in one of Manteca’s historical buildings, a Late Gothic Revival, constructed in 1928.

== Additional national program offering ==
As of 2006, Lindbergh Educational Center actively offered the National Girls Collaborative Project's Girls Discover program which focuses on Science, Technology, Engineering and Math. "The NGCP is designed to reach girl-serving STEM organizations across the United States."

== Courses offered ==
Through its Regional Occupation Center, Lindbergh Education Center offers a number of courses that are handicapped accessible to include:

- Career Guidance
- Clinical Medical Assistant
- Computers
- Exercise & Fitness
- GED Preparation
- English as a Second Language
- Guitar
- High School Diploma
- Medical Terminology/Transcriber
- Older Adult Programs
- Quilting
- Yoga

== Internet training ==
On May 13, 2009, Atsuhisa Okura, a Japanese Manga artist, taught students via an internet "virtual classroom".

== Sources ==
- LINDBERGH EDUCATIONAL CENTER www.mantecausd.net Retrieved:2010-05-03.
