= Weston Ranch =

Subdivision of tract homes in Stockton, California, U.S.

Weston Ranch is a subdivision of modest tract homes located in the southwestern corner of Stockton, California in San Joaquin County. It is approximately 1 hour away from the San Francisco Bay Area. The community is located just west of Interstate 5, with the San Joaquin River and French Camp Slough bordering its North and West sides, and French Camp Road bordering the south.

== History ==
Capt. William S. Moss, a riverboat captain, purchased the Weston Ranch marshlands in 1877 and turned it into farmland. His family owned the ranch for years until it was later sold for development in 1988.

The concept for an 11,000-unit residential area emerged in 1987 as a "mixed-use" planned community. The City of Stockton annexed the location in 1988, and construction started around 1989, with the first homes built in 1990. Lyon Communities and Verner Construction were the main developers for Weston Ranch, but encountered financial difficulties. In 1994, Bank of America took over the property and sold it to SunCal Cos. This change in ownership led to a shift away from the original developers' vision for Weston Ranch, including the abandonment of a planned marina, due to zoning changes. Majority of Weston Ranch's construction was completed in 2005, with final additions being New Vision High and Sandra B. Smith Park.

In 2007, Weston Ranch had the worst foreclosure rate in the area, according to ACORN.

== Community ==
=== Parks ===
In Weston Ranch, three parks are situated throughout the community, Paul E. Weston Park, William Long Park, and Sandra B. Smith Park, with the largest being Weston Park. Weston Ranch also features a bike path/trail with access to the levee that stretches the entire length of the community, as well as another on the San Joaquin River Levee, also encompassing the entire length of Weston Ranch.

=== New Development ===
- Marketplace at Weston Ranch - Located at the intersection of Carolyn Weston Boulevard and Manthey Road, this development introduces a new neighborhood shopping center serving both residents and travelers. The property encompasses seven parcels, with one designated for residential use and another vacant. Establishments included are Starbucks, 7-Eleven, and McDonald's. Beginning in 2021, construction has neared completion as of July 2024, except for Chipotle, Quick Quack Car Wash, and the residential lot, which are still pending construction.
- Asano Property at Weston Ranch - Named after the owners of the property, this project includes the subdivision of the undeveloped site located at the intersection of Carolyn Weston and Henry Long Blvd into 211 single-family residential units, as well as will feature 12 open space lots, with one situated along the San Joaquin River. The project will allow Carolyn Weston Boulevard to connect with itself south of the site. The project was initially projected to be completed by 2027. However, due to the tract's levees not meeting the 200-Year Flood Protection standards, it may delay the project, but developers are aiming to commence construction by late 2024.

== Schools ==
The schools in Weston Ranch are served by Manteca Unified School District and consists of three elementary schools; August Knodt, George Y. Komure, and Great Valley, as well as one high school; Weston Ranch High School and a continuation school; New Vision High School.

Location: (37.906461°N 121.300834°W)
