= Calla High School =

High school in California, United States

Coordinates: 37°47′50″N 121°10′46″W

- Manteca, California; United States

Information
- Type: Alternative high school
- School district: Manteca Unified School District
- Website: calla.mantecausd.net

Calla High School is an alternative high school located in Manteca, California. Previously labeled as a continuation school due to its past of accepting expelled students, now Calla High School only accepts valid students of Manteca Unified School District in the hope of receiving accelerated credits to get students back on track.
