= Kiwi Gardner =

American professional basketball player

Personal information
- Born: April 7, 1993 (age 33) Oakland, California, U.S.
- Listed height: 5 ft 7 in (1.70 m)
- Listed weight: 155 lb (70 kg)

Career information
- High school: Manteca (Manteca, California); Westwind Prep (Phoenix, Arizona)
- College: Midland (2012–2013)
- NBA draft: 2013: undrafted
- Playing career: 2013–2022
- Position: Point guard
- Coaching career: 2024–present

Career history

Playing
- 2013–2015: Santa Cruz Warriors
- 2015: Pioneros de Los Mochis
- 2015–2016: Al-Ansar
- 2017: Westports Malaysia Dragons
- 2020: Santa Cruz Warriors
- 2022: Illawarra Hawks

Coaching
- 2024–2025: New Taipei Kings (assistant)

Career highlights
- NBA D-League champion (2015); NBL1 East MVP (2022); NBL1 East All-Star Five (2022)

Keyondrei Samuel "Kiwi" Gardner (born April 7, 1993) is an American former professional basketball player. He became an Internet sensation via YouTube in 2011. Gardner played one season of college basketball for Midland College before beginning his professional career in 2013. As of 2024, he was a member of the New Taipei Kings coaching staff in the Taiwan Professional Basketball League.

== High school career ==
Gardner was born in Oakland, California. He was raised by his mother and his extended family in the Maxwell Park neighborhood, and began playing basketball at the age of four. From 2007 to 2010, Gardner attended Manteca High School in Manteca, California. As a sophomore in 2008–09, he averaged 19.8 points, 6.0 assists, 2.1 rebounds and 2.2 steals per game as he helped the Buffaloes finish with a 24–4 record. As a junior in 2009–10, he averaged 24 points, 3.8 assists, 3.9 rebounds and 3.5 steals as he helped the Buffaloes finish a 23–6 record.

In 2010, Gardner transferred to Westwind Preparatory Academy in Phoenix, Arizona. He did not meet the eligibility requirements of the Arizona Interscholastic Association because of transferring in his senior year, so he did not play on WPA's State Championship High School team that year. Instead, he played on WPA's prep team. Gardner was chosen to participate in the NCAA's High School Slam Dunk contest during the Final Four Tournament, where the crowd watched the same showmanship that has led to hundreds of thousands of hits on his YouTube highlight videos. He averaged 23.7 points, seven assists, four steals and four rebounds per game during the 2010–11 season, leading Westwind to a 30–2 record and a state title.

== College career ==
Gardner committed to Providence College, but he never gained eligibility to play. He subsequently sat out the 2011–12 season and transferred to Midland College, where he played nine games during the 2012–13 season. Following the season, he declared for the NBA draft.

== Professional career ==
After going undrafted in the 2013 NBA draft, Gardner spent the 2013–14 season in the NBA Development League with the Santa Cruz Warriors. After a stint with the Golden State Warriors during the 2014 NBA Summer League, Gardner returned to Santa Cruz for the 2014–15 season and helped the Warriors win the D-League championship.

In 2015, Gardner played in Mexico for Pioneros de Los Mochis. For the 2015–16 season, he played in Saudi Arabia with Al-Ansar. He scored 74 points in a game outside Mecca.

After a preseason stint with the Windy City Bulls in November 2016, Gardner joined the Westports Malaysia Dragons of the ASEAN Basketball League in February 2017. After one season, Gardner played in lower professional and semi-professional leagues in China, Japan, and Hong Kong.

On February 7, 2020, Gardner was acquired by the Santa Cruz Warriors, returning to the franchise for a second stint. He played 11 games to finish the 2019–20 NBA G League season.

In March 2022, Gardner moved to Australia to play for the Illawarra Hawks of the NBL1 East. He was named the 2022 NBL1 East MVP and earned All-Star Five honors.

== Coaching career ==
Gardner joined the coaching staff of the New Taipei Kings in the Taiwan Professional Basketball League for the 2024–25 season.
