= Weston Ranch High School =

Public high school in California, United States

Location
- 4606 McCuen Avenue; Weston Ranch; Stockton, San Joaquin County, California 95206; United States; 37.9007°N 121.30695°W

Information
- Type: Public
- Motto: "Cougars...Roar to Success"
- Established: 2003
- School district: Manteca Unified School District
- Principal: Troy Fast
- Teaching staff: 62.62 (FTE)
- Grades: 9-12
- Enrollment: 1,237 (2021–22)
- Student to teacher ratio: 19.77
- Classrooms: 63
- Colors: Maroon and Gray
- Fight song: Fight On!
- Athletics conference: San Joaquin Athletic Association, CIF Sac-Joaquin Section
- Mascot: Cougar
- Newspaper: The Prowl
- Website: westonranch.mantecausd.net

Weston Ranch High School is a secondary school located in the Weston Ranch subdivision of Stockton, California. WRHS opened its doors in 2003. It is part of the Manteca Unified School District.

== Demographics ==
According to 2021-22 demographics from the National Center of Education Statistics, The enrollment breakdown of Weston Ranch High School is as follows:

- African American (not Hispanic) : 177
- American Indian/Alaskan Native (not Hispanic): 2
- Asian (not Hispanic) : 252
- Hispanic/Latino of Any Race: 673
- Native Hawaiian/Pacific Islander (not Hispanic): 23
- Two or More Races (not Hispanic): 40
- White (not Hispanic) : 70
- Total : 1,237

== Sports ==
Weston Ranch High School offers the following sports:

- Baseball
- Basketball (Boys and Girls)
- Cross Country
- Football
- Golf (Boys and Girls)
- Soccer (Boys and Girls)
- Softball
- Swimming
- Tennis (Boys and Girls)
- Track and Field
- Volleyball (Boys and Girls)
- Water Polo
- Wrestling

== Notable alumni ==
- James Nunnally (born 1990), basketball player for Maccabi Tel Aviv of the Israeli Basketball Premier League and the Euroleague, formerly in the NBA
