= Manteca, California =

City in California, United States

- City
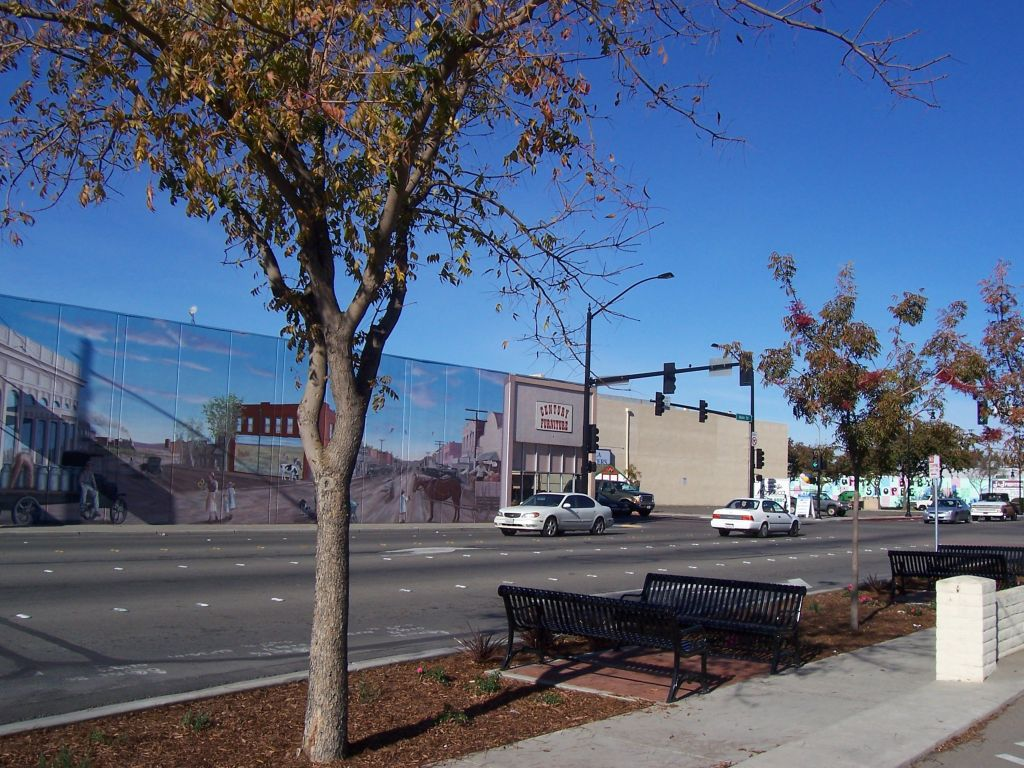
- From the corner of Yosemite and Main in Manteca
- Nickname: The Family City
- Interactive map of Manteca, California
- Location in California Location in the United States
- Coordinates: 37°48′10″N 121°13′15″W
- Country: United States
- State: California
- County: San Joaquin
- Incorporated: May 28, 1918

Government
  - Mayor: Gary Singh
  - State senator: Jerry McNerney (D)
  - Assemblymember: Heath Flora (R)
  - U. S. rep.: Josh Harder (D)

Area
  - Total: 21.41 sq mi (55.46 km^{2})
  - Land: 21.39 sq mi (55.40 km^{2})
  - Water: 0.023 sq mi (0.06 km^{2}) 0.11%
- Elevation: 36 ft (11 m)

Population (2020)
  - Total: 83,498
  - Rank: 81st in California
  - Density: 3,882/sq mi (1,498.8/km^{2})
- Time zone: UTC−8 (Pacific)
  - Summer (DST): UTC−7 (PDT)
- ZIP codes: 95336, 95337
- Area code: 209
- FIPS code: 06-45484
- GNIS feature IDs: 1659046, 2411024
- Website: www.manteca.gov

Manteca (/mænˈtiːkə/ man-TEE-kə; Spanish for "lard”) is a city in San Joaquin County, California. The city had a population of 83,498 as of the 2020 Census. It is part of the Stockton-Lodi, CA Metropolitan Statistical Area.

== History ==
Manteca is a city in the Central Valley of California, located 76 miles (122 kilometers) east of San Francisco and 18 miles (29 kilometers) northwest of Modesto. The Manteca area was first inhabited by Yokuts. Manteca was formally established in 1861 by Joshua Cowell. Cowell claimed around 1,000 acres (400 hectares) and built houses on what is now the corner of Main and Yosemite, where Bank of America now stands. In 1873, the Central Pacific Railroad laid track directly through the area. The residents wanted to refer to their new train station as "Cowell Station", but there was already a Cowell Station near Tracy. The residents agreed to change the name of the community, choosing "Monteca" as the new name. This was misprinted as "Manteca" (Spanish for lard) by the railroad, and the misspelled version was eventually accepted as the name of the town. In 1918, Manteca was incorporated as a city, and Joshua Cowell became its first mayor.

In 1935, photojournalist Dorothea Lange took photos of William & Mary Dimotakis (immigrants from the Greek island of Crete), and their youngest child, son George, on the family farm in Manteca for the Farm Security Administration. The farm, near the industrial park area, is still owned by the Dimotakis family. The images can be found in the Library of Congress.

Manteca fashions itself the "Family City", and it lies at a crossroads of major highways and railroads. As recently as the 1970s, Manteca existed primarily on agriculture and was still barely a stop between two freeways, Interstate 5 and State Route 99. The continuing rise in Bay Area housing prices caused Bay Area families to look further eastward for more affordable places to live. Since the construction of the 120 bypass portion of State Route 120, Manteca has become a popular choice for these commuters. The 1990s saw an increase in the city's population and the construction of its third high school (Sierra High School), joining Manteca High School and East Union High School. The population of Manteca continues to increase, with some housing being constructed on what was once farmland to the north and southeast. Manteca has more than tripled in population since 1980.

Manteca is the home base for the "Not Forgotten Memorial Day Event", the largest commemoration for veterans on the West Coast. The event is held annually on the Sunday before Memorial Day. The event draws over 20,000 attendees.

== Geography ==
According to the United States Census Bureau, the city has a total area of 21.4 square miles (55 km^{2}), 99.89% of it land and 0.11% of it water.

Neighboring towns include Lathrop, Ripon, Escalon, and Tracy. Manteca is located approximately 18 miles northwest of Modesto and 15 miles south of Stockton.

=== Climate ===
According to the Köppen Climate Classification system, Manteca has a hot-summer mediterranean climate, abbreviated "Csa" on climate maps. It is hot and dry in summer, and mild or cool in winter, except during spells of seasonal tule fog, when it can be quite chilly for many days. In December 2025, there were about 2 weeks during which the temperature failed to exceed 46 Fahrenheit. Summers are exceptionally dry, whereas winters are rainy with stretches of fair weather.

== Demographics ==
Historical population
Census	Pop.	Note	%±
1920	1,286		—
1930	1,614		25.5%
1940	1,981		22.7%
1950	3,804		92.0%
1960	8,242		116.7%
1970	13,845		68.0%
1980	24,925		80.0%
1990	40,773		63.6%
2000	49,258		20.8%
2010	67,096		36.2%
2020	83,498		24.4%
2025 (est.)	96,693	▲	15.8%
U.S. Decennial Census

=== Racial and ethnic composition ===
Manteca, California – Racial and ethnic composition Note: the US Census treats Hispanic/Latino as an ethnic category. This table excludes Latinos from the racial categories and assigns them to a separate category. Hispanics/Latinos may be of any race.
Race / Ethnicity (NH = Non-Hispanic)	Pop 2000	Pop 2010	Pop 2020	% 2000	% 2010	% 2020
White alone (NH)	31,556	31,476	28,900	64.06%	46.91%	34.61%
Black or African American alone (NH)	1,336	2,669	3,477	2.71%	3.98%	4.16%
Native American or Alaska Native alone (NH)	365	359	431	0.74%	0.54%	0.52%
Asian alone (NH)	1,662	4,549	11,627	3.37%	6.78%	13.92%
Pacific Islander alone (NH)	144	302	587	0.29%	0.45%	0.70%
Other Race alone (NH)	76	172	546	0.15%	0.26%	0.65%
Mixed race or Multiracial (NH)	1,756	2,252	4,038	3.56%	3.36%	4.84%
Hispanic or Latino (any race)	12,363	25,317	33,892	25.10%	37.73%	40.59%
Total	49,258	67,096	83,498	100.00%	100.00%	100.00%

=== 2020 census ===
As of the 2020 census, Manteca had a population of 83,498 and a population density of 3,903.8 inhabitants per square mile (1,507.3/km^{2}).

The age distribution was 25.1% under the age of 18, 9.1% aged 18 to 24, 26.2% aged 25 to 44, 24.5% aged 45 to 64, and 15.1% who were 65 years of age or older. The median age was 36.9 years. For every 100 females, there were 96.4 males, and for every 100 females age 18 and over there were 94.7 males age 18 and over.

The census reported that 99.4% of the population lived in households, 0.4% lived in non-institutionalized group quarters, and 0.2% were institutionalized. 99.7% of residents lived in urban areas, while 0.3% lived in rural areas.

There were 26,724 households, out of which 40.4% included children under the age of 18. Of all households, 55.3% were married-couple households, 6.5% were cohabiting couple households, 22.7% had a female householder with no spouse or partner present, and 15.4% had a male householder with no spouse or partner present. About 17.6% of all households were made up of individuals, and 8.8% had someone living alone who was 65 years of age or older. The average household size was 3.11. There were 20,699 families (77.5% of all households).

There were 27,623 housing units at an average density of 1,291.5 units per square mile (498.7 units/km^{2}), of which 26,724 (96.7%) were occupied. Of the occupied units, 66.3% were owner-occupied and 33.7% were occupied by renters. 3.3% of housing units were vacant. The homeowner vacancy rate was 0.9% and the rental vacancy rate was 3.9%.

=== 2023 ACS estimates ===
In 2023, the US Census Bureau estimated that the median household income was $94,718, and the per capita income was $37,326. About 7.5% of families and 10.4% of the population were below the poverty line.

=== 2010 census ===
The 2010 United States census reported that Manteca had a population of 67,096. The population density was 3,778.5 inhabitants per square mile (1,458.9/km^{2}). The racial makeup of Manteca was 49.6% White, 9.8% African American, 1.1% Native American, 12.1% Asian,0.6% Pacific Islander, 11.4% from other races, and 7.2% from two or more races. Hispanic or Latino of any race were 43.7%.

The Census reported that 66,601 people (99.3% of the population) lived in households, 150 (0.2%) lived in non-institutionalized group quarters, and 345 (0.5%) were institutionalized.

There were 21,618 households, of which 9,681 (44.8%) had children under the age of 18 living in them, 11,973 (55.4%) were opposite-sex married couples living together, 3,009 (13.9%) had a female householder with no husband present, 1,590 (7.4%) had a male householder with no wife present. There were 1,629 (7.5%) unmarried opposite-sex partnerships and 130 (0.6%) same-sex married couples or partnerships. 3,902 households (18.0%) were made up of individuals, and 1,542 (7.1%) had someone living alone who was 65 years of age or older. The average household size was 3.08. There were 16,572 families (76.7% of all households); the average family size was 3.48.

19,432 people (29.0% of the population) were under the age of 18, 6,569 people (9.8%) aged 18 to 24, 18,075 people (26.9%) aged 25 to 44, 16,367 people (24.4%) aged 45 to 64, and 6,653 people (9.9%) who were 65 years of age or older. The median age was 33.6 years. For every 100 females, there were 96.8 males. For every 100 females age 18 and over, there were 93.6 males.

There were 23,132 housing units at an average density of 1,302.7 units per square mile (503.0 units/km^{2}), of which 13,521 (62.5%) were owner-occupied, and 8,097 (37.5%) were occupied by renters. The homeowner vacancy rate was 2.7%; the rental vacancy rate was 6.5%. 41,225 people (61.4% of the population) lived in owner-occupied housing units and 25,376 people (37.8%) lived in rental housing units.

== Economy ==
=== Top employers ===
According to the city's 2022 Annual Comprehensive Financial Report, the top employers in the city are:

Employer	No. of employees
Amazon.com	1,139
Tennant Sales and Service Co.	800
Manteca Unified School District	751
City of Manteca	408
Doctors Hospital of Manteca	401
Kaiser Permanente	351
Walmart	316
Costco	312
BASS Pro Outdoor World	301
A.M. Stephens Construction Co., Inc.	250
C. Overaa & Co.	250
Eckert Cold Storage	250

== Government and politics ==
According to the California Secretary of State, as of October 21, 2024, Manteca has 48,177 registered voters. Of those, 19,424 (40.3%) are registered Democrats, 14,900 (30.9%) are registered Republicans, and 9,987 (20.7%) have declined to state a political party.

In presidential elections, Manteca has historically been a Republican stronghold. However, it has shifted toward the Democratic Party in recent years. In 2008, Barack Obama became the first Democrat to carry Manteca in a presidential election since Bill Clinton in 1992. Manteca has continued to vote Democratic at the presidential level since 2008. In 2020, Joe Biden won Manteca by 7.49%, the largest victory margin for a Democrat in the city since 1976. However in 2024, Donald Trump became the first Republican presidential candidate to win Manteca since George W. Bush in 2004.

Manteca city vote by party in presidential elections
Year	Democratic	Republican	Other
2024	45.84% 15,707	51.45% 17,629	2.71% 929
2020	52.65% 18,674	45.16% 16,017	2.18% 774
2016	49.68% 12,837	44.58% 11,517	5.74% 1,483
2012	51.95% 11,288	45.70% 9,930	2.35% 510
2008	51.76% 10,912	46.00% 9,699	2.24% 472
2004	42.78% 7,904	56.37% 10,414	0.85% 158
2000	44.48% 6,829	52.20% 8,013	3.32% 510
1996	42.89% 5,547	45.57% 5,894	11.54% 1,492
1992	38.32% 5,370	36.89% 5,170	24.79% 3,475
1988	42.69% 4,979	56.27% 6,563	1.04% 121

=== Local government ===
The City of Manteca is a general law city and as such is governed by a council–manager form of government. The city council is made up of the Mayor and four council members. The Mayor is elected at large every four years in non-presidential elections in even-numbered years, while previously two council members were elected at-large every two years. In 2021 the City Council voted to switch to district elections for council members, and in the November 2022 general election, district elections were held for council members for the first time.

The city hall is located at 1001 West Center Street, Manteca, CA 95337.

The current elected council

Council Member	Current Position
Gary Singh	Mayor
David Breitenbucher	Vice Mayor, District 3
Charlie Halford	Councilmember, District 1
Regina Lackey	Councilmember, District 2
Mike Morowit	Councilmember, District 4

=== County, state and federal representation ===
In the San Joaquin County Board of Supervisors, Manteca is in the 3rd district, which is represented by Democrat Sonny Dhaliwal.

In the United States House of Representatives, Manteca is in California's 9th congressional district, represented by Democrat Josh Harder.

In the California State Legislature, Manteca is in the 5th senatorial district, represented by Democrat Jerry McNerney, and California's 9th State Assembly district, represented by Republican Heath Flora.

California is represented by US Senators Alex Padilla and Adam Schiff, both Democrats.

== Transit ==
Manteca Transit Center is the hub of public transit in the city. Local bus service is provided by Manteca Transit.

A commuter rail service is provided by the Altamont Corridor Express (ACE) at the Lathrop/Manteca station. ACE operates in peak travel directions with trips to San Jose in the morning and to Stockton in the evening. The San Joaquin Regional Rail Commission (SJRRC) has been preparing the ACE Lathrop-Ceres Extension Project. This project would extend the current route through Manteca at the new Manteca Transit Center. This project has recently completed the Environmental Impact Report (EIR) and has begun the final design stage. Construction planned to begin in Fall 2024 with service planned to begin in 2025.

== Education ==
Public schools in Manteca are part of the Manteca Unified School District. The school district encompasses the towns of Manteca, Lathrop, the community of French Camp, and the Weston Ranch community in Stockton. There are no middle schools; elementary school continues through the 8th grade, with a mix of both year-round and traditional schools. Manteca Unified School District has 19 elementary schools, 5 high schools, and 2 continuation schools. Not all of the schools listed below are in Manteca itself.

=== High schools ===
- Calla High School
- East Union High School
- Manteca High School
- Sierra High School
- Weston Ranch High School
- New Vision High School (continuation)
- Lathrop High School
- BE.Tech High School and Career Academy

=== Elementary schools ===
- August Knodt
- Brock Elliott
- French Camp
- George Komure
- George McParland
- Golden West
- Great Valley (Salida)
- Joseph Widmer Jr.
- Joshua Cowell
- Lathrop
- Lincoln
- Mossdale Elementary
- Neil Hafley
- New Haven
- Nile Garden
- Sequoia
- Shasta
- Stella Brockman
- Veritas
- Walter E. Woodward
- Alta Vista (private)
- St. Anthony's (private)

=== Adult schools ===
- Lindbergh Educational Center

Private School

Manteca is also served by St. Anthony Catholic School (PK-*).

== Churches ==
- Central Valley Baptist Church
- Crossroads Grace Community Church
- Saint Anthony's Catholic Church

== Notable people ==
- Eric Nascimento (b. 2001) - American Racing Driver
- Ethan Nascimento (b. 2007) - American Racing Driver
- Gilbert Luján (1940 – 2011) – sculptor, painter
- Joshua Patton (b. 1997) - basketball player in the Israeli Basketball Premier League
- Justin Roiland (b. 1980) – animator, director, producer and voice-actor
- Kiwi Gardner (b. 1993) – current NBA G League basketball player; attended Manteca High School
- Scott Brooks (b. 1965) – former NBA basketball player and current assistant coach; attended East Union High School
- Sammy L. Davis (b. 1946) – Medal of Honor recipient
- Marliece Andrada (b. 1972) – actress and Playboy's Playmate of the Month in March 1998
- Ernie Barber (b. 1914 – d. 1989) – former NFL player for the Washington Redskins
- April Bowlby (b. 1980) – actress
- Milo Candini (b. 1917 – d. 1998) – Major League Baseball player 1943–51
- Karen Jankowski — rally driver
- Congressman John J. McFall (1918 – 2006), served in the US House of Representatives 1957–79. Majority Whip and Appropriations Transportation Subcommittee Chairman. Mayor of Manteca and Member of California State Assembly. Son of Hope McFall who was killed in action in World War I.
- Doug Mikolas (b. 1961) – football player
- Ted Nuce (b. 1961) – former World Champion bull rider, Pro Rodeo Hall of Fame; attended Manteca High School
- Scott Speed (b. 1983) – race car driver
- Dev (b. 1989) – singer songwriter
- Paul Wiggin (b. 1934) – former American football player and coach; attended Manteca High School
- Kenny Wooten (b. 1998) – NBA basketball player; attended Manteca High School

== See also ==
- Great Wolf Lodge (Manteca, California)
- San Joaquin County
