= East Union High School =

Location
- 1700 North Union Road; Manteca, California 95336; United States; 37.8220°N 121.2344°W

Information
- School type: Public
- Established: 1966
- Principal: Eric Simoni
- Teaching staff: 77.75 (FTE)
- Enrollment: 1,510 (2023–2024)
- Student to teacher ratio: 19.42
- Colors: Red, blue, and white
- Mascot: Lancer
- Website: eastunion.mantecausd.net

East Union High School (EUHS) is a secondary school located in northwestern Manteca, California. The school first opened in 1966 with an enrolment of 514 students, 26 staff members and four counselors. As of 2005, East Union High School enrolls over 1,600 students annually.

== Notable alumni ==
- April Bowlby - Actress and model
- Scott Brooks - NBA player
- Scott Speed - Race car driver
- Zelmar Vedder - NFL cornerback for the Kansas City Chiefs
