= Ernie Barber (American football) =

American football player (1914–1989)

No. 43
- Positions: Center, linebacker

Personal information
- Born: April 18, 1914; Murfreesboro, Tennessee
- Died: June 5, 1989 (aged 75); Manteca, California

Career information
- College: San Francisco

Career history
- 1945: Washington Redskins
- Stats at Pro Football Reference

Ernest Charles Barber (April 18, 1914 – June 5, 1989) was an American football center and linebacker. Born in Murfreesboro, Tennessee, he attended Manteca High School in California. He played college football for the University of San Francisco Dons football team in 1934. He later played professional football for the Stockton Shippers in 1938. He served in the United States Army during World War II. After the war, he played in the National Football League for the Washington Redskins, appearing in three games during the 1945 season. He was sold by the Redskins to the New York Giants in early November 1945 but did not appear in any games for the Giants. He died in 1989 at Manteca, California

His brother Jim Barber also played for redskins as a tackle from 1935 to 1941.
