= Tony Dominguez Jr. =

American boxer

Tony Dominguez, Jr.
Personal information
- Nicknames: Red; Manteca's KO Artist
- Nationality: Mexican
- Born: Antonio Dominguez, Jr. April 3, 1963 (age 63) Stockton, California, United States
- Height: 6 ft 0 in (1.83 m)
- Weight: Middleweight; Light Middleweight welterweight

Boxing career
- Stance: Orthodox

Boxing record
- Total fights: 16
- Wins: 16
- Win by KO: 14
- Losses: 0
- Draws: 0
- No contests: 0

Tony Dominguez, Jr. is an American professional boxer. He is locally known as Tony "Red" Dominguez because of his bright red hair. He was undefeated but forced into early retirement due to a severely injured rotator cuff.

== Early life ==
Tony Dominguez was born to Antonio Dominguez, Sr, and Mary (Garcia) Dominguez. Dominguez was raised in a rough neighborhood which led to his defiance at home and early trouble with the law. He was constantly being teased for being red-headed which eventually pushed Dominguez to get into fights at school. After many fights with his peers, Dominguez discovered his talent for fighting and resulted in trying boxing as a sport.

== Boxing career ==
As an amateur Tony Dominguez fought and won 21 bouts. Of the 21 wins, 19 were first-round knockouts. As a professional he fought 16 fights in which he won all of them. Of the 16 wins, 14 were wins by way of knockout. He quickly became a local favorite to the Stockton area alongside other local boxer, Kenny Lopez.

== Personal life ==
Tony is married to his second wife Kristy (Holifield) Dominguez. He is a father of eight children.
