= Lathrop High School (California) =

Location
- 647 Spartan Way; Lathrop, California 95330; 37.82651°N 121.30321°W

Information
- Type: Public secondary
- Established: 2008
- School district: Manteca Unified School District
- Principal: Melissa Beattie
- Faculty: 96
- Teaching staff: 75.09 (FTE)
- Grades: 9–12
- Enrollment: 1,509 (2023–2024)
- Student to teacher ratio: 20.10
- Colors: Black and gold
- Mascot: Spartan
- Website: mantecausd.net/lathrophighschool

Lathrop High School, located in Lathrop, California, United States, is a secondary school in the Manteca Unified School District. Its doors opened on August 11, 2008. LHS is known as the "Home of the Spartans".

== History ==
Lathrop High became the first secondary school in the city of Lathrop. With no high school in the city, students within Lathrop city limits fed into the surrounding high schools in the district, with Sierra High School being the primary recipient of Lathrop students. With the growing population in the central valley, the Manteca Unified School District made the decision to create a new high school in the growing city of Lathrop. Lathrop High School opened in fall 2008, with David Chamberlain as the principal. The student population started with roughly 500 students, consisting only of freshmen and sophomores.

Lathrop High School now has a student population over 1,200.

== Demographics ==
As of 2012–2018:

- Hispanic/Latino 60%
- Filipino 20%
- White 10%
- African American 5%
- Asian 4%
- Pacific Islander 1%
- American Indians 1%
- Mixed race 0%

== Athletics ==
Lathrop High School has different sports teams, and participates in the Western Athletic Conference.

The teams are as follows:

- Football
- Basketball (girls' and boys')
- Baseball
- Softball
- Soccer (girls' and boys')
- Wrestling
- Volleyball (girls' and boys')
- Tennis (girls' and boys')
- Track and field
- Golf (girls' and boys')
- Cross country
- Swim (girls' and boys')
