= Citrus Belt League =

American high school sports league

Citrus Belt League (CBL) is a high school sports league in the Inland Empire region within the Greater Los Angeles area of California's CIF Southern Section.

The Citrus Belt League is one of the five founding leagues of the California Interscholastic Federation Southern Section (CIF-SS) when established in 1913. It was the only Division I league in the San Bernardino-Riverside County area since its inception, until 2006, when CIF Southern Section reorganized it to Division II.

== History ==
=== Origins in the early 1900s ===
The league dates back to 1901, when it was known as the "Interscholastic League of Southern California." Prior to CIF Southern Section, founding members included Chaffey High School of Ontario (then known as Ontario High School), Redlands High School, Riverside High School (now known as Riverside Poly), Pomana High School and San Bernardino High School. School staff were not involved in most of the contests and anyone could play or coach. In 1913, when the CIF Southern Section athletics was established, the Citrus Belt League was a founding member along with the Los Angeles League, Los Angeles County League Suburban Section, Los Angeles County League City Section, and Orange League.

The Interscholastic League of Southern California, as the Citrus Belt League was called in 1901 and 1902, included Redlands, Pomona, Riverside and San Bernardino. Ontario joined in 1902. During this tenure, Redlands High School and Chaffey High School played in 68 football matches between 1903 and 1986, making it one of the state's longest running and oldest rivalries in the sport.

=== 1950s, 1960s and 1980s ===
Fontana High School and Pacific High School (San Bernardino) joined in 1954. San Bernardino's San Gorgonio High School and Rialto's Eisenhower High School joined in 1967, and San Bernardino left after the 1969-1970 school year. Colton High School joined (again) in 1980.

=== 1980s and 1990s ===
Pacific High School left after 1981-1982 when it was closing, but it did not rejoin the league when it reopened.

By the 1990s, multiple schools were added and replaced, including in 1992-1993 to 1996-1997 in which High Desert schools Apple Valley High School, Hesperia High School, and Victor Valley High School were members. The High Desert high schools were eventually replaced with Fontana's A.B. Miller High School in 1997. Redlands East Valley High School joined in 1997.

=== 2000 to present ===
In 2004, Yucaipa High School joined the Citrus Belt League, Colton joined in 2004 but left after 2005-2006, and then Wilmer Amina Carter joined in 2006-2007 and Rialto High School and Carter left after 2009-2010.

Fontana High School left in the 2012-2013 season for the Sunkist League ending its sixty year membership in the CBL. Fontana was replaced by San Bernardino's Cajon High School

In the 2014–15 season, the league expanded to an eight-team realignment again, adding Rialto's Carter High School. Redlands Citrus Valley High School joined in 2014-2015. Eisenhower High School left for the San Andreas League after the 2019-2020 season, ending that schools 53-year membership in the CBL. Fontana's A.B. Miller left for the Mountain Valley League after finishing the 2017-2018 school year. Beaumont High School joined in the 2020-2021 school year.

== Members ==
As of January 2025, the league has six members:

| School | Mascot | City | Member Since |
|---|---|---|---|
| Redlands High School | Terriers | Redlands | 1901 |
| Redlands East Valley High School | Wildcats | Redlands | 1997 |
| Yucaipa High School | Thunderbirds | Yucaipa | 2004 |
| Cajon High School | Cowboys | San Bernardino | 2013 |
| Redlands Citrus Valley High School | Blackhawks | Redlands | 2013 |
| Beaumont High School | Cougars | Beaumont | 2020 |

=== Former ===
Former members include Corona High School, Pomona High School, Palm Springs High School, Moreno Valley High School, Riverside's Rubidoux High School, Ramona High School, San Bernardino's San Gorgonio High School, and San Bernardino's Pacific High School.

=== Teams by school year, number, name and sport ===
- 1901-1902 (4) Redlands, Pomona, Riverside, San Bernardino (as Interscholastic League of Southern California). San Bernardino was ousted in January 1902 because of conduct and replaced with Ontario Sports: Football.
- 1902-1903 (5) Redlands, Pomona, Riverside, Ontario, San Bernardino (as Interscholastic League of Southern California). Fullerton was also a member, but had no football team. Sports: Football.
- 1903-1904: (3) Redlands, Pomona, Riverside (as Citrus Belt League) Sports: Football
- 1904-1905 (6) Redlands, Pomona, Riverside, Ontario, Colton, San Bernardino. Sports: Football, Track, Basketball, Baseball, Tennis.
- 1905-1906 (4) Redlands, Pomona, Riverside, Ontario. Sports: Football, Tennis, Boys and Girls Basketball, Track, Baseball
- 1906-1907 (6) Redlands, Pomona, Riverside, Ontario, Colton, San Bernardino Sports: Football (Rugby), Boys and Girls Basketball. The teams voted to play rugby instead of American football because the University of California and Stanford switched to rugby.
- 1907-1908 (6) Redlands, Pomona, Riverside, Ontario, Colton, San Bernardino. Sports: Football(Rugby), Boys and Girls Basketball.
- 1908-1909 (6) Redlands, Pomona, Riverside, Ontario, Colton, San Bernardino Sports: Football(Rugby) (Colton and Ontario don't have enough students for a team). Track
- 1909-1910 (7) Redlands, Pomona, Riverside, Ontario, Colton, San Bernardino Chino. Sports: Football (Rugby), Baseball.
- 1910-1911 (6) Redlands, Pomona, Riverside, Ontario, Colton, San Bernardino. Sports: Football, Basketball
- 1911-1912 (8) Redlands, Pomona, Riverside, Chaffey (Ontario), Colton, Chino, Claremont, San Bernardino. San Bernardino expelled but back for 1912. Sports: Football (Rugby), Basketball, Track, Baseball.
- 1912-1913 (8) Class A Large Schools: Redlands, Riverside, Pomona, San Bernardino Class B Small Schools: Chino, Claremont, Colton, Chaffey. Hemet (track only) Sports: Football (Rugby), Basketball, Track, Baseball.
- 1913-1914 (6) Redlands, Pomona, Riverside, San Bernardino, Chaffey, Colton, Corona, Sports: Football (Rugby) (Redlands, Riverside, Pomona and San Bernardino only, Chaffey played American football) Basketball
- 1914-1915 (7) Redlands, Pomona, Riverside, San Bernardino, Chaffey, Colton, Corona Sports: Football(Rugby) (only Redlands, Pomona, Riverside and Chaffey), Basketball, Baseball.
- 1915-1916 (8) Redlands, Pomona, Riverside, San Bernardino, Chaffey, Colton, Corona, Chino. Sports: Football(American), Basketball (not including Redlands), Baseball, Track.
- 1921-1922 (5) Redlands, Pomona, Riverside, Chaffey, San Bernardino. Sports: Football
- 1949-1950 (5) Redlands, Pomona, Riverside, Chaffey, San Bernardino. Sports: Football, Basketball, Baseball
- 1954-1955 (8) Redlands, Pomona, Riverside, Chaffey, Colton, San Bernardino, Pacific, Fontana. Sports: Football, Basketball, Baseball.
- 1956-1957 (8) Redlands, Pomona, Riverside, Chaffey, Colton, San Bernardino, Pacific, Fontana. Sports: Football, Basketball
- 1966-1967 (6) Redlands, Chaffey, San Bernardino, Pacific, Fontana, Ramona. Sports: Football
- 1967-1968 (8) Redlands, Chaffey, San Bernardino, Pacific, Fontana, Ramona, Eisenhower, San Gorgonio. Sports: Football
- 1969-1970 (8) Redlands, Chaffey, San Bernardino, Pacific, Eisenhower, San Gorgonio, Colton, Ramona Sports: Football, Track, Basketball, Baseball.
- 1970-1971 (8) Redlands, Chaffey, Pacific, Eisenhower, San Gorgonio, Fontana, Ramona, Riverside Poly Sports: Football, Baseball Golf (Boys)
- 1971-1972 (8) Redlands, Chaffey Pacific, Eisenhower, San Gorgonio, Fontana, Ramona, Riverside Poly. Sports: Football, Water Polo, Cross-Country, Basketball Tennis (Girls)
- 1972-1973 Redlands, Chaffey, Pacific, Eisenhower, San Gorgonio, Fontana, Ramona, Riverside Poly. Sports: Football
- 1978-1979 (8) Redlands, Chaffey, Pacific, Eisenhower, San Gorgonio, Fontana, Corona, Palm Springs. Sports: Fall: Football, Cross-Country, Water Polo, Girls Volleyball, Girls Tennis
- 1979-1980 (8) Redlands, Chaffey, Pacific, Eisenhower, San Gorgonio, Fontana, Corona, Palm Springs. Sports: Fall: Football
- 1981-1982 (6) Redlands, Pacific, Eisenhower, San Gorgonio, Fontana, Colton Sports: Fall: Football
- 1982-1983 (6) Redlands, Pacific, Eisenhower, San Gorgonio, Fontana, Colton. Sports: Football
- 1984-1985 (8) Redlands, Eisenhower, San Gorgonio, Fontana, Riverside Poly, Colton, Rubidoux, Palm Springs. Sports: Football.
- 1989-1990 (8) Redlands, Eisenhower, San Gorgonio, Fontana, Riverside Poly, Colton, Rubidoux, Moreno Valley. Sports: Football, Girls Tennis, Girls Volleyball.
- 1990-1991 (6) Redlands, Eisenhower, San Gorgonio, Fontana, Riverside Poly, Rubidoux. Sports: Football.
- 1991-1992 (6) Redlands, Eisenhower, San Gorgonio, Fontana, Riverside Poly, Rubidoux. Sports: Football, Girls Volleyball, Cross-Country, Boys Basketball, Girls Basketball Girls Soccer, Boys Soccer, Baseball, Softball, Swimming, Boys Tennis, Track and Field
- 1992-1993 (6) Redlands, Eisenhower, Fontana, Victor Valley, Apple Valley, Hesperia. Sports: Football, Girls Volleyball
- 1993-1994 (6) Redlands, Eisenhower, Fontana, Victor Valley, Apple Valley, Hesperia Sports: Football, Girls Volleyball, Girls Tennis, Cross-Country Winter: Boys Basketball, Girls Basketball, Girls Soccer, Boys Soccer, Spring: Baseball, Softball, Swimming, Boys Tennis, Track and Field
- 1994-1995 (6) Redlands, Eisenhower, Fontana, Victor Valley, Apple Valley, Hesperia. Sports: Football
- 1997-1998 (6) Redlands, Eisenhower, Fontana, Colton, A.B. Miller, Rialto. Sports: Football
- 1998-1999 (6) Redlands, Eisenhower, Fontana, Redlands East Valley, A.B. Miller, Rialto. Sports: Football
- 2001-2002 * Hemet West Valley played league games in boys volleyball
- 2003-2004 (6) Redlands, Eisenhower, Fontana, Redlands East Valley, A.B. Miller, Rialto. Sports: Football
- 2004-2005 (8) Redlands, Eisenhower, Fontana, Redlands East Valley, A.B. Miller, Rialto, Yucaipa, Colton. Sports: Football
- 2005-2006 (8) Redlands, Eisenhower, Fontana, Redlands East Valley, A.B. Miller, Rialto, Yucaipa, Colton. Sports: Football
- 2006-2007 (8) Redlands, Eisenhower, Fontana, Redlands East Valley, A.B. Miller, Rialto, Yucaipa, Carter Sports: Football
- 2007-2008 (8) Redlands, Eisenhower, Fontana, Redlands East Valley, A.B. Miller, Rialto, Yucaipa, Carter Sports: Football
- 2008-2009 (8) Redlands, Eisenhower, Fontana, Redlands East Valley, A.B. Miller, Rialto, Yucaipa, Carter Sports: Football
- 2009-2010 (8) Redlands, Eisenhower, Fontana, Redlands East Valley, A.B. Miller, Rialto, Yucaipa, Carter Sports: Football
- 2010-2011 (6) Redlands, Eisenhower, Fontana, Redlands East Valley, A.B. Miller, Yucaipa. Sports: Football
- 2011-2012 (6) Redlands, Eisenhower, A.B. Miller, Redlands East Valley, Yucaipa, Cajon. Sports: Football
- 2012-2013 (6) Redlands, Eisenhower, A.B. Miller, Redlands East Valley, Yucaipa, Cajon. Sports: Football
- 2013-2014 (6) Redlands, Eisenhower, A.B. Miller, Redlands East Valley, Yucaipa, Cajon. Sports: Football
- 2014-2015 (8) Redlands, Eisenhower, Redlands East Valley, Yucaipa, Cajon, A.B. Miller, Carter, Citrus Valley. Sports: Football
- 2015-2016 (8) Redlands, Eisenhower, Redlands East Valley, Yucaipa, Cajon, A.B. Miller, Carter, Citrus Valley. Sports: Football
- 2016-2017 (8) Redlands, Eisenhower, Redlands East Valley, Yucaipa, Cajon, A.B. Miller, Carter, Citrus Valley. Sports: Football
- 2017-2018 (8) Redlands, Eisenhower, Redlands East Valley, Yucaipa, Cajon, A.B. Miller, Carter, Citrus Valley. Sports: Football
- 2018-2019 (6) Redlands, Eisenhower, Redlands East Valley, Yucaipa, Cajon, Citrus Valley. Sports: Football, Boys Water Polo, Girls Golf, Girls Tennis, Cross-Country, Girls Volleyball.
- 2020-2021 (6) Redlands, Redlands East Valley, Citrus Valley, Yucaipa, Cajon, Beaumont Sports: Fall: Football, Boys Water Polo, Girls Golf, Girls Tennis, Cross-Country, Girls Volleyball (cancelled COVID-19) Winter: Wrestling (boys and girls), Girls Water Polo, Boys Basketball, Girls Basketball, Girls Soccer Spring: Baseball, Boys Golf, Softball, Swimming, Boys Tennis, Track and Field.
- 2024-2025 (6) Redlands, Redlands East Valley, Citrus Valley, Yucaipa, Cajon, Beaumont. Sports: Fall: Football, Girls Flag Football, Boys Water Polo, Girls Golf, Girls Tennis, Cross-Country, Girls Volleyball, Winter: Wrestling (boys and girls), Girls Water Polo, Boys Basketball, Girls Basketball, Girls Soccer. Spring: Baseball, Boys Golf, Softball, Swimming, Boys Tennis, Track and Field.

== School champions by sport ==
=== Football (and Rugby) ===
1901: Pomona 1902: Pomona 1903: Riverside 1904: Pomona 1905 (American): Redlands 1906 (Rugby): Redlands 1907 (Rugby): Pomona 1908 (Rugby): Pomona 1909 (Rugby): Redlands 1913 (Rugby): Pomona 1914 (Rugby): Pomona 1915 (American): Pomona 1916: Chaffey 1925: Pomona 1950: Redlands 1951: Pomona 1954: Riverside 1959: Redlands 1960: Colton 1961 (co-champions): Redlands and San Bernardino 1964: Ramona 1970: Redlands 1973 Redlands 1977: Chaffey and Redlands 1979: Fontana 1980: Fontana 1981: Colton 1987: Fontana 1988: Fontana 1989: Fontana 1991: Eisenhower 1992: Fontana 1993: Eisenhower 1994: Fontana 1995: Fontana 1996: Fontana 1997: Eisenhower 1999: Eisenhower 2000: Eisenhower 2001: Redlands 2002: Eisenhower 2003: Redlands East Valley 2004: Colton 2005: Redlands East Valley 2006: Redlands 2007: Redlands East Valley 2008: Miller 2009: Redlands East Valley 2010: Redlands East Valley 2011: Redlands East Valley 2012: Redlands East Valley 2013: Eisenhower 2014: Redlands East Valley 2015: Cajon 2016: Redlands East Valley 2017: Cajon 2018: Cajon 2019: Cajon 2020-2021: Cajon Fall 2021: Cajon 2022: Cajon 2023: Citrus Valley 2024: Beaumont

=== Baseball ===
1906: Pomona 1925: San Bernardino 1972: Fontana 1974: Redlands 1984: Eisenhower 1985: Riverside Poly 1987: Fontana 1991: Riverside Poly 1994: Redlands 2010: Redlands East Valley

=== Badminton ===
2006: Redlands

=== Basketball (Boys) ===
1916: Corona 1921: San Bernardino 1925: San Bernardino 1932: Chaffey 1936: Redlands 1960: Pacific 1973: Pacific 1974: Pacific 1980: San Gorgonio 1988: Moreno Valley 1991: Redlands 1994: Fontana 1995: Eisenhower 1996: Victor Valley 2000: A.B. Miller 2006: Redlands East Valley 2007: Redlands 2013 (co-champions): Redlands East Valley

=== Basketball (Girls) ===
1988: Redlands 1989: Fontana 2000: Redlands 2001: Redlands 2012: Eisenhower 2020: Yucaipa

=== Cross-Country (Boys) ===
2001: Redlands East Valley High School

=== Cross Country (Girls) ===
1998: Redlands East Valley High School 2006: Redlands

=== Golf (Boys) ===
1971: Eisenhower and Riverside Poly 2006: Redlands

=== Golf (Girls) ===
2013: Redlands 2014: Redlands 2023: Redlands

=== Softball ===
1989: Moreno Valley 1991: Fontana 1993: Fontana

=== Soccer (Boys) ===
1980: Palm Springs 1986: Riverside Poly 1991: Fontana 1992: San Gorgonio 1996: Apple Valley 1996: Redlands 1998: Redlands 2001: Redlands 2002: Rialto 2014: Redlands East Valley

=== Soccer (Girls) ===
1990: Riverside Poly 1995: Redlands 1996: Redlands 1998: Redlands 1999: Redlands 2000: Redlands 2015: Redlands 2020: Citrus Valley 2021: Citrus Valley 2022: Citrus Valley 2023: Citrus Valley

=== Tennis (Boys) ===
1936: Redlands 1995: Redlands 2017: Redlands

=== Tennis (Girls) ===
1971: Redlands 1974: Redlands 1992: Redlands 1998: Redlands East Valley High School 2001: Redlands East Valley 2006: Redlands 2014: Redlands 2021: Redlands 2024: Redlands

=== Track (Boys) ===
1909: Pomona 2006: Redlands

=== Track (Girls) ===
2006: Redlands

=== Volleyball (Boys) ===
2000: Hemet West Valley 2001: Arrowhead Christian 2003: Arrowhead Christian 2004: Hemet West Valley 2005: Hemet West Valley 2015: Redlands 2016: Redlands 2024: Yucaipa

=== Volleyball (Girls) ===
1972: Redlands 1973: Redlands 1974: Pacific 1975: Pacific 1976: Chaffey 1977: Chaffey 1978: Eisenhower 1979: Palm Springs 1980: Eisenhower 1981: Eisenhower 1982: Colton 1983: Colton 1984: Riverside Poly 1985: Palm Springs 1986: Colton 1987: Colton 1988: Fontana and Colton 1989: Eisenhower and Colton 1990: Redlands 1991: Redlands 1992: Apple Valley 1993: Redlands 1994: Redlands 1995: Redlands 1996: Redlands 1997: Redlands 1998: Redlands East Valley 1999: Redlands East Valley 2000: Redlands and Redlands East Valley 2001: Redlands East Valley 2002: Redlands 2003: Redlands East Valley 2004: Yucaipa 2005: Redlands East Valley 2006: Redlands 2007: Redlands East Valley 2008: Redlands East Valley 2009: Redlands East Valley 2010: Redlands East Valley 2011: Yucaipa 2012: Redlands East Valley 2013: Redlands East Valley 2014: Redlands East Valley 2015: Redlands East Valley 2016: Yucaipa 2017: Yucaipa 2018 Citrus Valley and Redlands East Valley 2019: Citrus Valley 2020: Season Cancelled COVID-19 2021: Beaumont 2022: Redlands 2023: Redlands 2024: Redlands 2025: Redlands

=== Water Polo (Boys) ===
1974: Chaffey 1975: Chaffey 1976: Chaffey 1977: Chaffey 1978: Chaffey 1980: San Gorgonio 1982: Fontana 1999: Redlands 2002: Redlands 2014: Redlands

=== Water Polo (Girls) ===
1999: Redlands 2000: Redlands 2001: Redlands 2002: Redlands 2006: Redlands 2023: Redlands

=== Wrestling ===
1970: Fontana

== Sports ==
=== Fall (September–November) ===
- Football
- Girls Flag Football
- Girls Volleyball
- Girls Golf
- Cross Country Running
- Girls Tennis
- Boys Water Polo

=== Winter (December–February) ===
- Girls Water Polo
- Boys Basketball
- Girls Basketball
- Boys Soccer
- Girls Soccer
- Wrestling

=== Spring (March–May) ===
- Boys Golf
- Baseball
- Softball
- Badminton
- Boys Track and Field
- Girls Track and Field
- Boys Swimming
- Girls Swimming
- Boys Tennis
- Boys Volleyball
