= Cajon High School =

School in San Bernardino, California, U.S.

Location
- 1200 West Hill Drive; San Bernardino, California 92407; United States; 34°10′36″N 117°18′34″W

Information
- Type: Senior High School
- Motto: Sapere aude (Dare to be wise)
- Established: 1971
- School district: San Bernardino City Unified School District
- Principal: Christopher Jackson
- Teaching staff: 111.95 (FTE)
- Grades: 9-12
- Enrollment: 2,662 (2023-2024)
- Student to teacher ratio: 23.78
- Campus type: Urban
- Colors: Forest Green & Gold
- Nickname: Cowboys
- Yearbook: Vaquero
- Website: cajon.sbcusd.com

Cajon High School is located in the University District of San Bernardino, California, and is part of the San Bernardino City Unified School District.

== Academics ==
Cajon High School is part of the International Baccalaureate Organization (IB) including the high school portion of the Middle Years Programme and IB Diploma Programme. The school offers the AVID program as well. It has exemplary Mock Trial and Academic Decathlon teams, and numerous Cajon students are members of the California Scholarship Federation, National Honor Society and the National Forensic League Debate and Speech Honor Society (National Speech and Debate Association).

== Athletics ==

In 1987, Cajon Football won its first CIF Southern Section Championship. In 1995 the Cajon Football team was the first team in the history of San Bernardino to go undefeated in the regular season, winning games by an average score of 42-7. In the 2007-2008 school-year, Cajon won 12 San Andreas League championships (Arroyo Valley, Carter, Colton, Pacific, Rialto, San Bernardino, & San G) and the girls basketball team also won the CIF championship for the first time in Cajon's history (for any basketball team). The girls basketball team also won CIF in the 2008-2009 School year. In the 2012-2013 academic year, Cajon changed leagues to the Citrus Belt League - (Ike, AB Miller, Redlands, REV, & Yucaipa). The school's athletic grounds and football stadium was dedicated after alumni and NFL player Jayden Daniels in 2024.

=== Fall ===
- Boys' Cross Country
- Boys' Football
- Boys' Waterpolo
- Girls' Cross Country
- Girls' Golf
- Girls' Tennis
- Girls' Volleyball

=== Winter ===
- Boys' Basketball
- Boys' Soccer
- Boys' Wrestling
- Girls' Basketball - (32-3), 2016 CIF Division II State Champions
- Girls' Soccer
- Girls' Waterpolo

=== Spring ===
- Boys' Baseball
- Boys' Golf *Boys' Swimming
- Boys' Tennis
- Girls' Swimming
- Girls' Track & Field

== Notable alumni ==
- Brent Austin, football player
- Saad Awad, mixed martial artist
- Bob Bees, football player
- Aaron Brooks, baseball player
- Jayden Daniels, football player
- Craig Gerber, baseball player
- Charles Johnson, football player
- Damontae Kazee, football player
- Jeremiah Martin, football player
- Helen Tran, mayor of San Bernardino
- Sebastian Tretola, football player
