= Lytle Creek, California =

Community in San Bernardino County, California

Lytle Creek
- Census-designated place
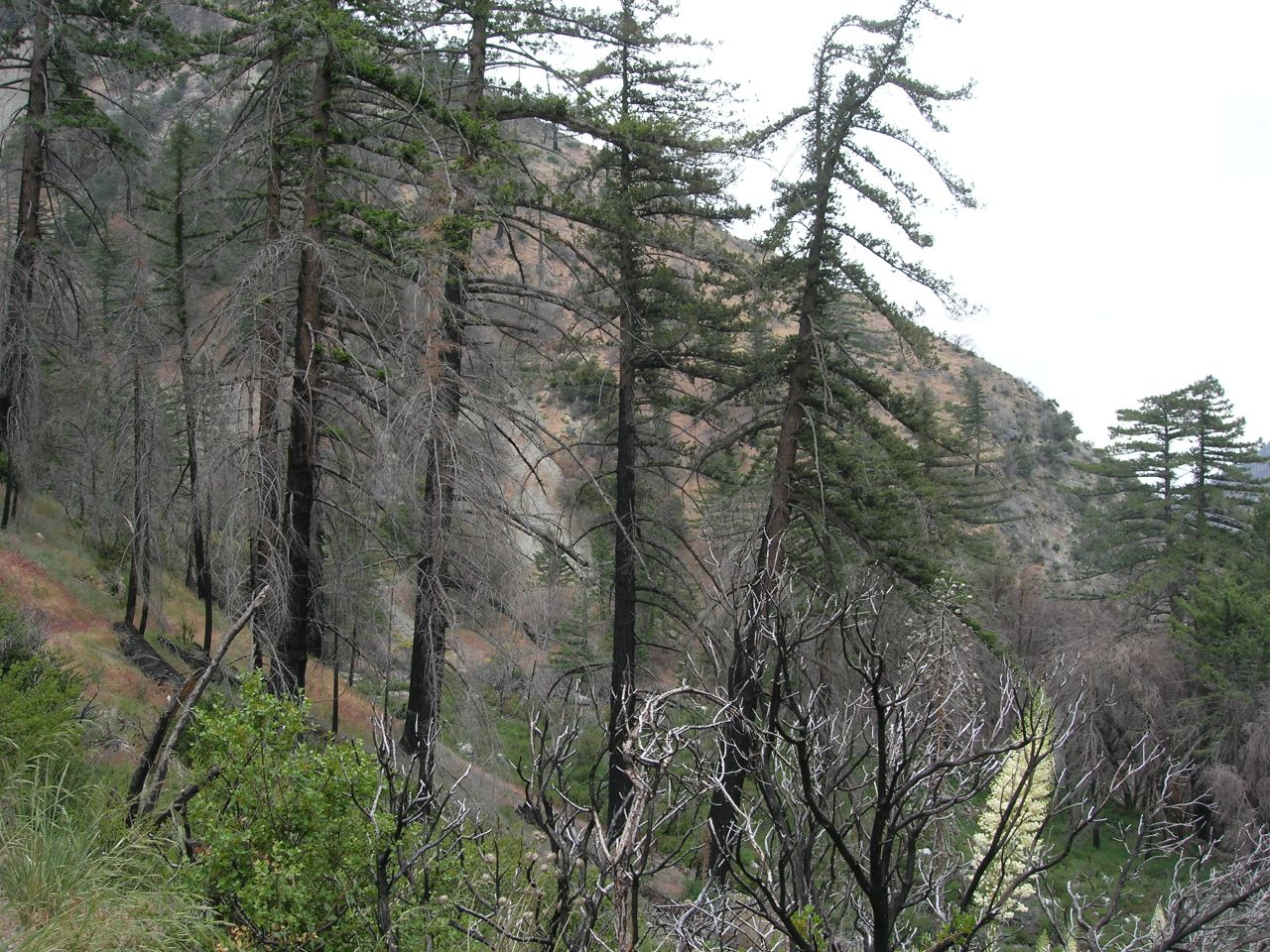
- Middle Fork of Lytle Creek

- Location in San Bernardino County and the state of California

- Location within the state of California Lytle Creek (the United States)
- Coordinates: 34°15′33″N 117°29′57″W
- Country: United States
- State: California
- County: San Bernardino
- Established: 1851

Area
  - Total: 6.018 sq mi (15.586 km^{2})
  - Land: 6.018 sq mi (15.586 km^{2})
  - Water: 0 sq mi (0 km^{2}) 0%
- Elevation: 3,419 ft (1,042 m)

Population (2020)
  - Total: 725
  - Density: 120/sq mi (46.5/km^{2})
- Time zone: UTC-8 (Pacific)
  - Summer (DST): UTC-7 (PDT)
- ZIP code: 92358
- Area code: 909
- FIPS code: 06-44644
- GNIS feature IDs: 1660968, 2583066

Lytle Creek is a census-designated place in the San Gabriel Mountains, within the Inland Empire region of San Bernardino County.

It is about 16 miles (26 km) northwest of downtown San Bernardino and 10 miles (16 km) from the cities of Fontana and Rialto. This small remote community is located in a large southeast-trending canyon on the eastern portion of the San Gabriel Mountains completely within the boundaries of the San Bernardino National Forest. The population was 725 at the 2020 census.

The ZIP Code for Lytle Creek is 92358 and the community is inside area code 909.

== Geography ==
According to the United States Census Bureau, the CDP covers an area of 6.0 square miles (15.6 km^{2}), all of it land.

=== Climate ===
According to the Köppen Climate Classification system, Lytle Creek has a warm-summer Mediterranean climate, abbreviated "Csa" on climate maps.

== History ==
A group of members of The Church of Jesus Christ of Latter-day Saints, otherwise known as Mormons, arrived in the valley in 1851, making camp at the mouth of a canyon with a creek, which flowed briskly southeast through the canyon to the valley and the Santa Ana River. Overjoyed with the abundance of water, the dense growth of willows, cottonwoods and sycamores and the mustard and wild oats that grew on the hillsides, the settlers of San Bernardino named the stream "Lytle Creek" after their leader, Captain Andrew Lytle. Lytle Creek Canyon has been a site for gold mining, farming and recreation activities such as fishing, camping, picnicking, and hiking. It has been considered a recreational area since the early 1870s.

== Public schools ==
All middle school and high school students in Lytle Creek travel down to Rialto to attend schools in Rialto Unified School District

Elementary students attend Kordyak Elementary school in Rialto.

== Local Newspaper ==
Lytle Creek has its own newspaper "The Canyon" published by the Lytle Creek Community Center since 1948. All work is done by volunteers Under the Community Center Board of Trustees (a nonprofit organization), Ciji Mobley runs the Youth Group, Anna Sorum distributes commodities to about 100 individuals and runs a local branch of the San Bernardino County Library, Ken Philips delivers meals to the homebound, and Mary Stinson manages the local Red Cross emergency shelter program. Sally Boyd directs an active branch of CERT (Community Emergency Response Team) also operates with county OES.

== Safety ==
Lytle Creek is patrolled by the San Bernardino County Fontana Sheriff Station (which also serves unincorporated Fontana and Bloomington).

Fire protection services are mainly provided by The San Bernardino County Fire Department (SBCoFD) Service Area 38 which provides administration and support for County Service Area 38 fire district and other services such as hazardous materials regulation, dispatch communication and disaster preparedness. In Lytle Creek, the San Bernardino County Fire Department (SBCoFD) provides services through the Valley Division of their department. Other agencies providing fire protection services and or fire related information for the Lytle Creek community include the California Department of Forestry and Fire Protection (CAL FIRE) and the Mountain Area Safety Taskforce (MAST). In addition, the US Forest Service has a station located in the Lytle Creek area.

== Demographics ==
Historical population
Census	Pop.	Note	%±
2010	701		—
2020	725		3.4%
U.S. Decennial Census; 1850–1870 1880-1890; 1900 1910 1920; 1930 1940 1950; 1960 1970 1980; 1990 2000 2010

Lytle Creek first appeared as a census designated place in the 2010 U.S. census.

The 2020 United States census reported that Lytle Creek had a population of 725. The population density was 120.5 inhabitants per square mile (46.5/km^{2}). The racial makeup of Lytle Creek was 510 (70.3%) White, 23 (3.2%) African American, 5 (0.7%) Native American, 34 (4.7%) Asian, 2 (0.3%) Pacific Islander, 54 (7.4%) from other races, and 97 (13.4%) from two or more races. Hispanic or Latino of any race were 170 persons (23.4%).

The census reported that 689 people (95.0% of the population) lived in households, 36 (5.0%) lived in non-institutionalized group quarters, and no one was institutionalized.

There were 317 households, out of which 66 (20.8%) had children under the age of 18 living in them, 123 (38.8%) were married-couple households, 26 (8.2%) were cohabiting couple households, 90 (28.4%) had a female householder with no partner present, and 78 (24.6%) had a male householder with no partner present. 93 households (29.3%) were one person, and 48 (15.1%) were one person aged 65 or older. The average household size was 2.17. There were 202 families (63.7% of all households).

The age distribution was 119 people (16.4%) under the age of 18, 41 people (5.7%) aged 18 to 24, 166 people (22.9%) aged 25 to 44, 240 people (33.1%) aged 45 to 64, and 159 people (21.9%) who were 65 years of age or older. The median age was 48.5 years. For every 100 females, there were 113.9 males.

There were 386 housing units at an average density of 64.1 units per square mile (24.7 units/km^{2}), of which 317 (82.1%) were occupied. Of these, 230 (72.6%) were owner-occupied, and 87 (27.4%) were occupied by renters.

According to the 2010 United States Census, Lytle Creek had a median household income of $77,568, with 2. of the population living below the federal poverty line.

== Government ==
In the California State Legislature, Lytle Creek is in the 23rd senatorial district, represented by Republican Suzette Martinez Valladares, and in the 41st Assembly district, represented by Democrat John Harabedian.

In the United States House of Representatives, Lytle Creek is in California's 28th congressional district, represented by Democrat Judy Chu.

== Education ==
It is in the Rialto Unified School District.
