= Payton Williams =

American football player (born 1978)

No. 28, 21, 37
- Positions: Defensive back, return specialist

Personal information
- Born: November 19, 1978 (age 47); Riverside, California, U.S.
- Listed height: 5 ft 7 in (1.70 m)
- Listed weight: 170 lb (77 kg)

Career information
- High school: Moreno Valley (Moreno Valley, California)
- College: Fresno State (1996–1999)
- NFL draft: 2000: undrafted

Career history
- Indianapolis Colts (2000); Pittsburgh Steelers (2000–2002)*; → Berlin Thunder (2001); Calgary Stampeders (2002)
- * Offseason or practice squad member only

Awards and highlights
- World Bowl champion (IX)

Career NFL statistics
- Games played: 7
- Return yards: 346
- Tackles: 2
- Stats at Pro Football Reference
- Stats at CFL.ca

Payton Mychal Williams (born November 19, 1978) is an American former professional football defensive back and return specialist who played in the National Football League (NFL) for the Indianapolis Colts and Pittsburgh Steelers. He played college football for the Fresno State Bulldogs. Williams also had a stint in NFL Europe with the Berlin Thunder and the Canadian Football League (CFL) with the Calgary Stampeders.

== Early life ==
Williams was born on November 19, 1978, in Riverside, California. He attended Moreno Valley High School in Moreno Valley, California. Williams was an All-State selection as a senior.

== College career ==
Williams played college football for the Fresno State Bulldogs from 1996 to 1999 and was a four-year letterman. He had six interceptions for 87 yards and had 40 punt returns for 511 yards and one touchdown in 43 games.

== Professional career ==
=== Indianapolis Colts ===
After going undrafted in the 2000 NFL draft, Williams signed with the Indianapolis Colts as an undrafted free agent. In the first seven games, he served as the team's return specialist, returning 12 kickoffs for 238 yards and seven punts for 108 yards. On November 1, Williams was waived by the Colts.

=== Pittsburgh Steelers ===
On December 13, 2000, the Pittsburgh Steelers signed Williams to the practice squad. On January 11, 2001, he was re-signed by the team. On August 31, Williams was released and signed to the practice squad. On February 5, 2002, he signed a reserve/futures contract. On August 29, Williams was waived by the team.

=== Berlin Thunder ===
On January 11, 2001, Williams was allocated to the Berlin Thunder of NFL Europe. He had 55 tackles, three interceptions, 13 pass break ups, one forced fumble and 59 punt return yards, as the team won World Bowl IX.

=== Calgary Stampeders ===
On September 11, 2002, Williams was signed by the Calgary Stampeders to the practice roster. On October 3, he was promoted to the active roster and made his debut on October 5 against the Hamilton Tiger-Cats. Williams played in two games, recording five tackles and one pass break up. On October 17, he was placed on the injured list. Williams became a free agent at the end of the season.
