= San Andreas League =

High school athletic league in California

The San Andreas League is a high school athletic league that is part of the CIF Southern Section. Members are located around San Bernardino County, California. The San Andreas League Is now a part of a conference that also includes The Sunkist League, Notre Dame High School and Wilmer Amina Carter High School the conference has 3 leagues, San Andreas League, Sunkist League, and Skyline League. All schools for boys and girls sports can move freely through the 3 leagues through means of competitive balance. This conference is called the Arrowhead Athletic Conference

== Members ==
- Arroyo Valley High School
- Eisenhower High School
- Jurupa Hills High School
- Rim of the World High School
- Rialto High School
- San Gorgonio High School
