= Ryan Clady =

American football player (born 1986)

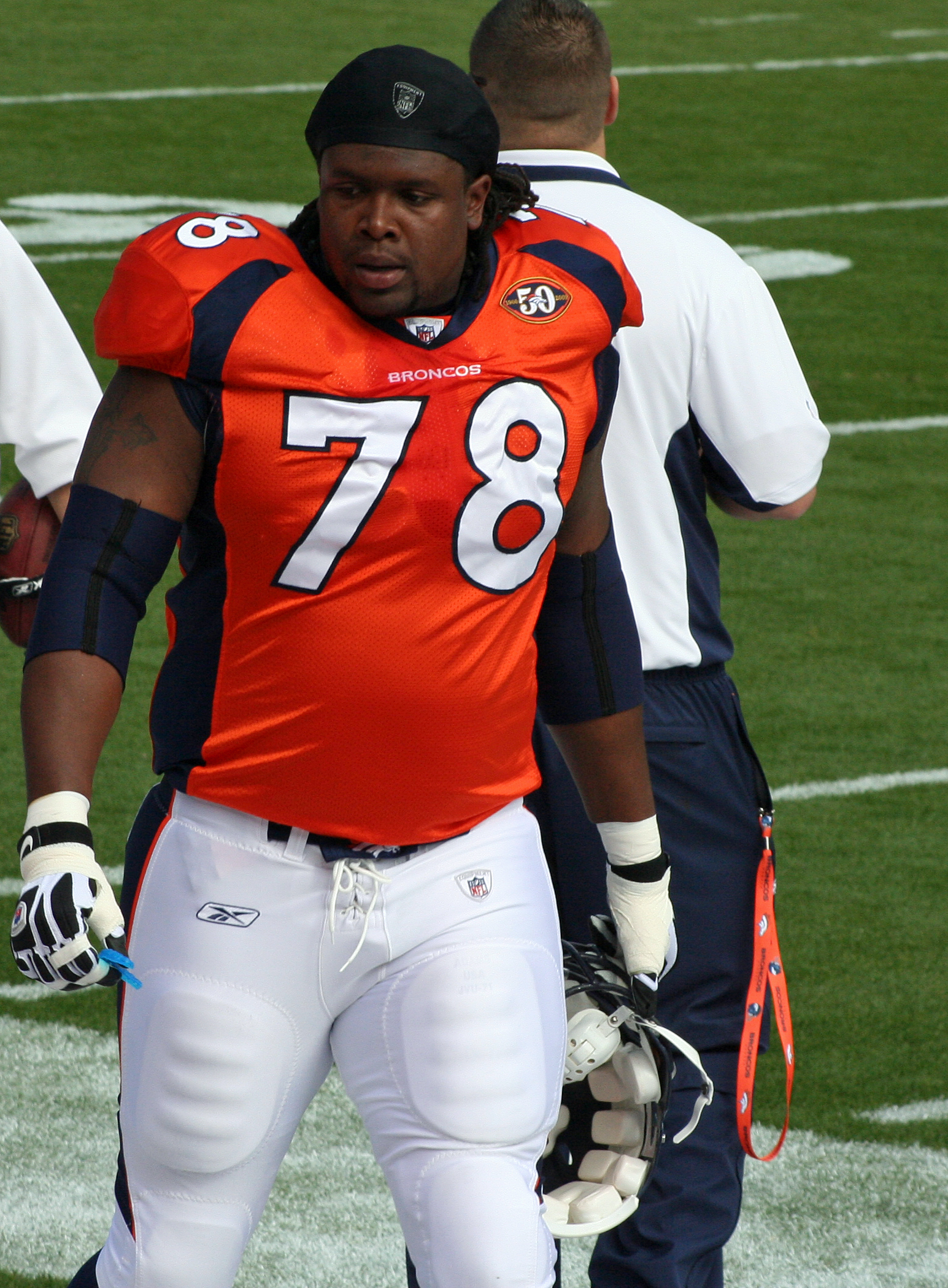
- Clady with the Denver Broncos in 2009

No. 78
- Position: Offensive tackle

Personal information
- Born: September 6, 1986 (age 40); Long Beach, California, U.S.
- Listed height: 6 ft 6 in (1.98 m)
- Listed weight: 315 lb (143 kg)

Career information
- High school: Eisenhower (Rialto, California)
- College: Boise State (2004–2007)
- NFL draft: 2008: 1st round, 12th overall pick

Career history
- Denver Broncos (2008–2015); New York Jets (2016)

Awards and highlights
- Super Bowl champion (50); 2× First-team All-Pro (2009, 2012); Second-team All-Pro (2008); 4× Pro Bowl (2009, 2011, 2012, 2014); PFWA All-Rookie Team (2008); Consensus All-American (2007); Second-team All-American (2006); 2× First-team All-WAC (2006, 2007)

Career NFL statistics
- Games played: 107
- Games started: 106
- Fumble recoveries: 3
- Stats at Pro Football Reference

Ryan Jacob Clady (born September 6, 1986) is an American former professional football player who was an offensive tackle for nine seasons in the National Football League (NFL). He played college football for the Boise State Broncos, earning consensus All-American honors. The Denver Broncos selected Clady in the first round of the 2008 NFL draft, and he was named to four Pro Bowls in his eight years with the team. He also played one season for the New York Jets.

== Early life ==
Clady was born in Long Beach, California. He attended Eisenhower High School in Rialto, California and was a letterman in football and track. He was also a first-team All-Citrus Belt League selection, a first-team All-San Bernardino County selection, and a first-team All-California Interscholastic Federation Division I selection.

In track & field, Clady competed in the shot put (PR of 15.90m) and the discus throw (PR of 46.41m).

Clady graduated from Eisenhower High School in 2004. Rated only a two-star recruit by Rivals.com, he was not ranked among the nation's top offensive tackle prospects.

== College career ==
Clady attended Boise State University, where he played for the Boise State Broncos football team from 2004 to 2007. He redshirted as a freshman in 2004. He earned the starting right tackle position at the beginning of the 2005 season and started 13 of 13 games. He was voted to several dotcoms' second and third team All-American squads. He was moved to the left side before the 2006 campaign, starting all 13 games. Clady earned first-team All-Western Athletic Conference (WAC) honors following his sophomore season and was also named to the prestigious SI.com Second-team All-American squad. In 2007, he started each game he played for Boise State and was once again a First-team All-WAC selection. Clady also made several First-team All-American rosters.

Clady was part of Boise State's historic 43–42 overtime win over Oklahoma in the 2007 Fiesta Bowl. In that game, many scouts first were able to see Clady on a national stage and marveled at how well Clady handled Oklahoma pass rushers. He also had the key block for Ian Johnson in the game-winning Statue of Liberty play.

== Professional career ==
=== Pre-draft ===
Clady drew comparisons to Chris Samuels.

Pre-draft measurables
Height	Weight	Arm length	Hand span	40-yard dash	10-yard split	20-yard split	20-yard shuttle	Three-cone drill	Vertical jump	Broad jump	Bench press	Wonderlic
6 ft 6 1/8 in (1.98 m)	309 lb (140 kg)	36 3/4 in (0.93 m)	10 in (0.25 m)	5.18 s	1.81 s	2.96 s	4.73 s	7.07 s	31 in (0.79 m)	9 ft 0 in (2.74 m)	24 reps	13
All values from NFL Combine/Boise State's Pro Day

=== Denver Broncos ===
Clady was selected by the Denver Broncos, with the 12th overall pick in the first round of the 2008 NFL draft. Clady was the highest drafted player in Boise State history and the 11th to be selected in the 1st round. He was also Denver's highest selected offensive lineman since Chris Hinton in 1983. The Broncos signed him to a five-year deal worth $46.75 million. It was reported to guarantee $23.375 million.

Clady started every game during the 2008 NFL season and gave up just a half of a sack while committing only three penalties. Following Week 12 of the 2008 NFL season, Peter King of Sports Illustrated said Clady was the third-best rookie overall. On December 12, 2008, Clady won the Diet Pepsi NFL Rookie of the Week award, after his game against the Kansas City Chiefs. That was the first time all season that a lineman, either offensive or defensive, won the award.

Clady finished third in voting behind Matt Ryan and Chris Johnson for the 2008 NFL Offensive Rookie of the Year Award. He was the only offensive lineman to receive any votes. He was the only starting NFL offensive lineman to give up less than one sack for the entire season. He was named to the Associated Press NFL All-Pro Second Team behind Michael Roos and Jordan Gross.

In 2009, the Sporting News listed Clady as the No. 1 offensive tackle in the NFL. After the Broncos' October 4, 2009, victory over the Dallas Cowboys, Clady set a new NFL record for consecutive games to start a career without giving up a full sack. Through his first 20 games, he surrendered only half of a sack. Clady was named a starter for the 2009 Pro Bowl and was named first-team All-Pro by the Sporting News and Associated Press after the 2009 season.

On April 28, 2010, Clady injured his patella tendon while playing basketball but did not miss a game the following season.

In 2011, Clady played all 16 games and was added to the 2012 Pro Bowl roster along with teammate Willis McGahee. After the season, the Broncos tried to sign Clady to a long-term deal and offered him a 5-year $50 million deal with $28 million guaranteed, but he refused.

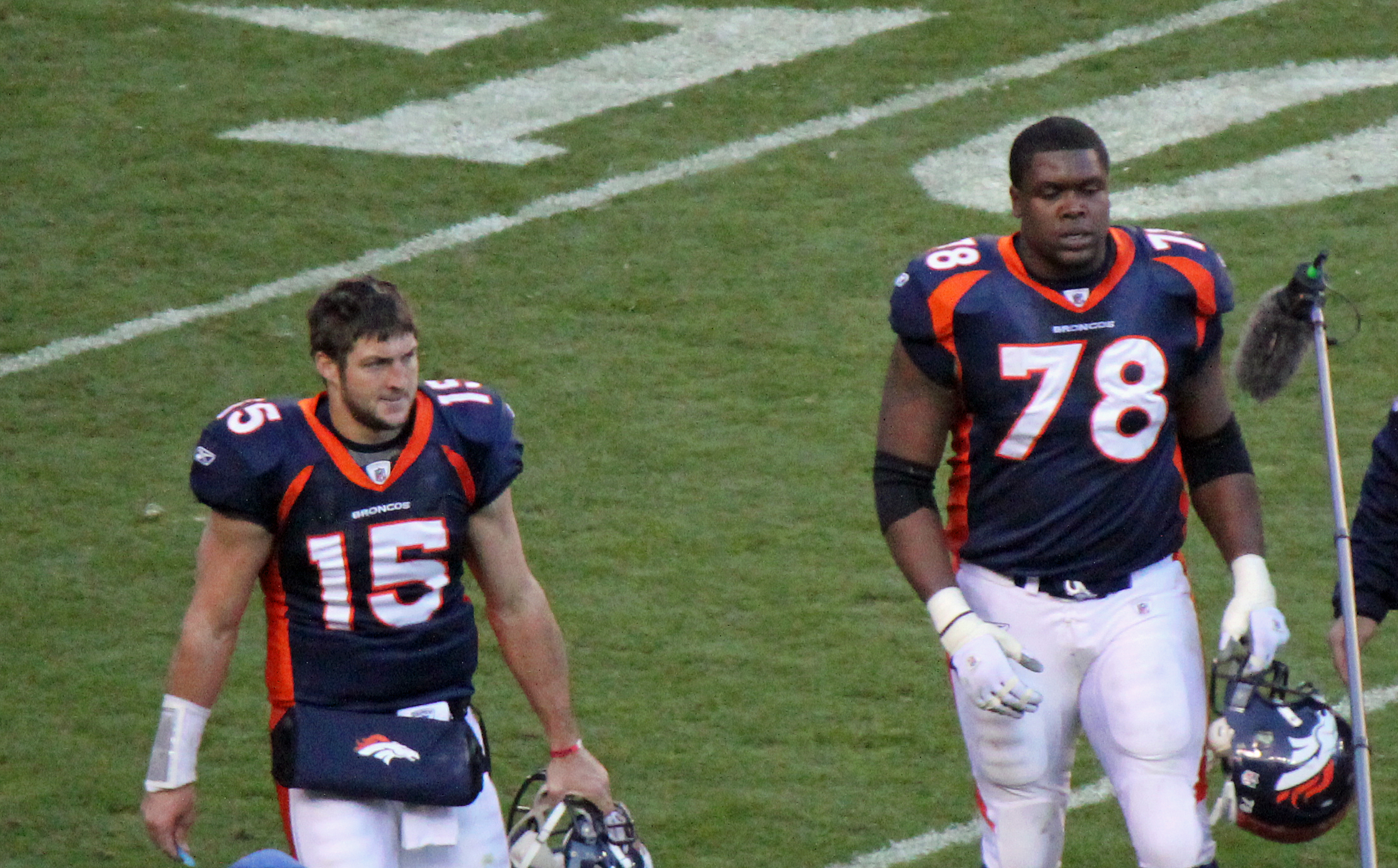
Tim Tebow and Clady in January 2012

In the 2012 season, Clady allowed just one sack the entire season. Towards the end of the season, he tore a labrum in his right shoulder but still did not miss any time. He played the last few games of the season including the playoffs with the injury and had surgery to repair it only after the season ended. He was selected to the 2013 Pro Bowl but did not play because of his shoulder injury.

On March 1, 2013, in order to prevent Clady from becoming an unrestricted free agent, the Broncos assigned him the franchise tag, worth $9.823 million. On July 14, 2013. Clady agreed to a new contract with the Broncos worth $52.5 million for five years. Of that, $33 million was guaranteed over the first three years of the contract. There was a maximum of $5 million in incentives attached to the deal. If Clady was named to the Associated Press's All-Pro team, then he would receive an extra $500,000 each subsequent season. Should he be named to the team a second time, he would receive an extra $1.5 million. The deal came one day prior to the July 15 deadline to extend "franchise-tagged" players.

On September 18, 2013, Clady was placed on season-ending injured reserve, due to a Lisfranc injury he suffered during a week two matchup against the New York Giants. The Denver Broncos signed Winston Justice to replace his roster spot. Without Clady, the Broncos finished the 2013 season with the #1 offense and a 13–3 record. They reached Super Bowl XLVIII, but lost 43–8 to the Seattle Seahawks.

Clady played in the 2015 Pro Bowl, earning his fourth appearance based on play during the 2014 season.

On May 28, 2015, Clady tore his ACL during OTA's. He was placed on injured reserve and sat out for the 2015 season.

On February 7, 2016, Clady was part of the Broncos team that won Super Bowl 50 over the Carolina Panthers by a score of 24–10, but he did not play in the game due to his previously torn ACL.

=== New York Jets ===
On April 9, 2016, Clady and a seventh-round pick were traded to the New York Jets in exchange for a fifth-round pick. On April 10, he signed a one-year, $6 million contract with the Jets, including a club option for 2017. He was placed on injured reserve on November 9, 2016, with a shoulder injury. It was reported he was diagnosed with a torn rotator cuff and missed the rest of the season after having surgery.

On February 15, 2017, the Jets declined Clady's $10 million option, making him an unrestricted free agent.

=== Retirement ===
On August 1, 2017, Clady announced his retirement from the NFL after nine seasons, tweeting, "I'm excited about what life holds for me going forward." On December 30, 2017, he signed an unofficial ceremonial contract with the Broncos to retire as a member of the team.
