= Citrus Valley High School =

Public school in California, United States

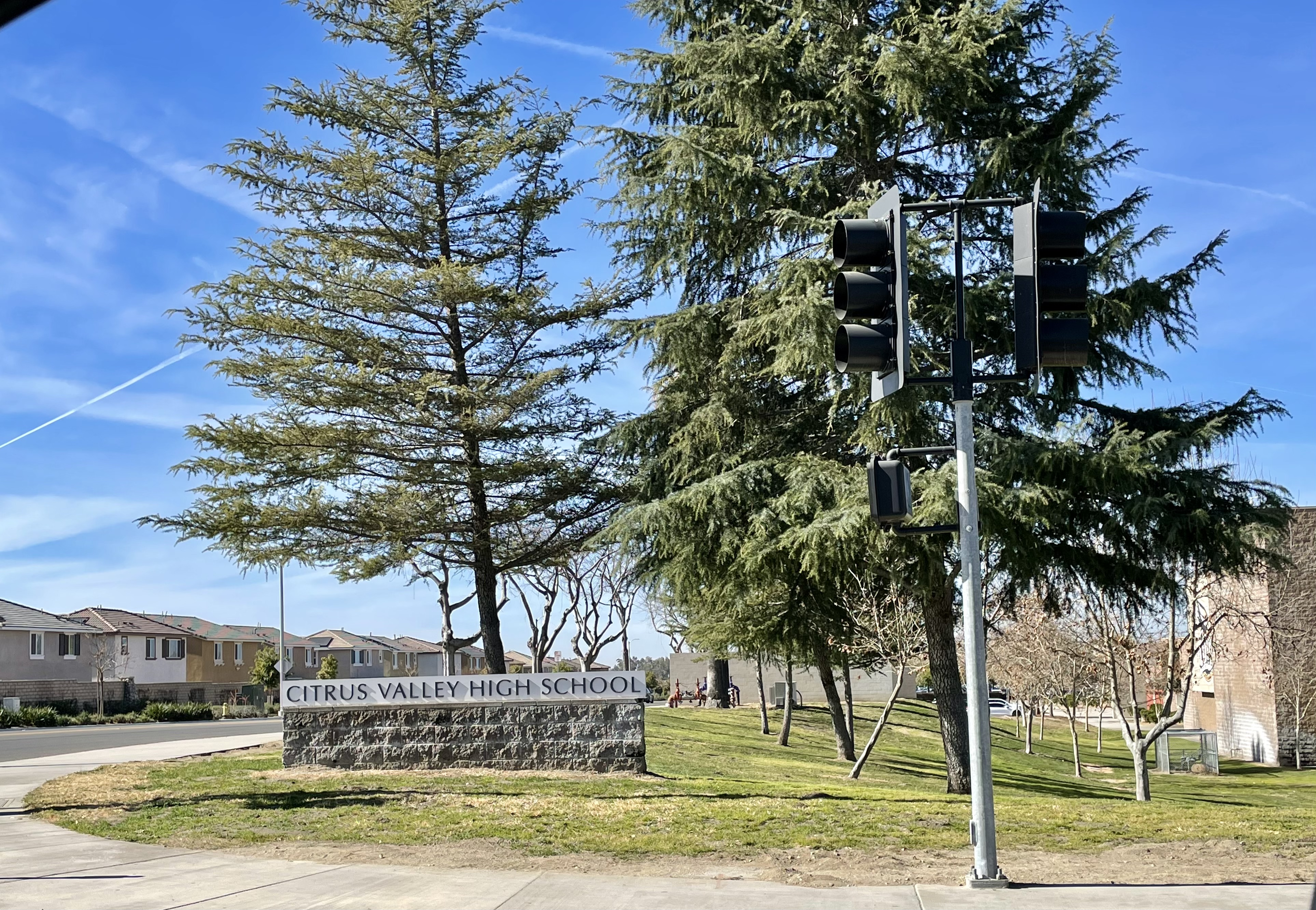

Location
- 800 W. Pioneer Avenue Redlands, California 92374; United States
- 34.0823°N 117.1934°W

Information
- Type: Senior High School
- Established: August 12, 2009
- Principal: Maisie McCue
- Teaching staff: 98.13 (FTE)
- Enrollment: 2,206 (2023-2024)
- Student to teacher ratio: 22.48
- Colors: Black and Gold
- Mascot: Blackhawk
- Website: www.redlandsusd.net/cvhs

Citrus Valley High School is a high school in the Redlands Unified School District in Redlands, California, located in San Bernardino County. Citrus Valley High School is Redlands' fifth high school in its district, but third conventional public high school in the district. It was founded on August 12, 2009.

== History ==
A decade after building Redlands East Valley (REV), both Redlands High School (RHS) and REV High School suffered from overcrowding. Superintendent Robert Hodges pushed for a school district bond measure to build the school. The school was built in two phases: half of the school was built using funds from Measure R passed in 2003, and the other half was built with funds from superintendent Hodges endorsed Measure J, that passed in 2008. The reason for two measures is because of the rise in construction cost in California. The high school was also populated in phases. The first graduating class from Citrus Valley High School was the class of 2012. The first graduating class to start as freshmen and finish as seniors graduated in 2013. The football stadium for athletics was named after Superintended Robert J. Hodges who retired in 2008.

During construction, the school district fought a legal court case of eminent domain regarding the property on what is now the southwest 9.5 acre parking lot adjacent the stadium entrance. The owner of the lot, 85 year old Ellen Disparte disputed eminent domain, she won and was awarded $3.4 million in the settlement and allowed to live on the property until her death. After her death in 2018, her farm and property were transferred to Redlands USD and the final phase of construction was completed by 2019.

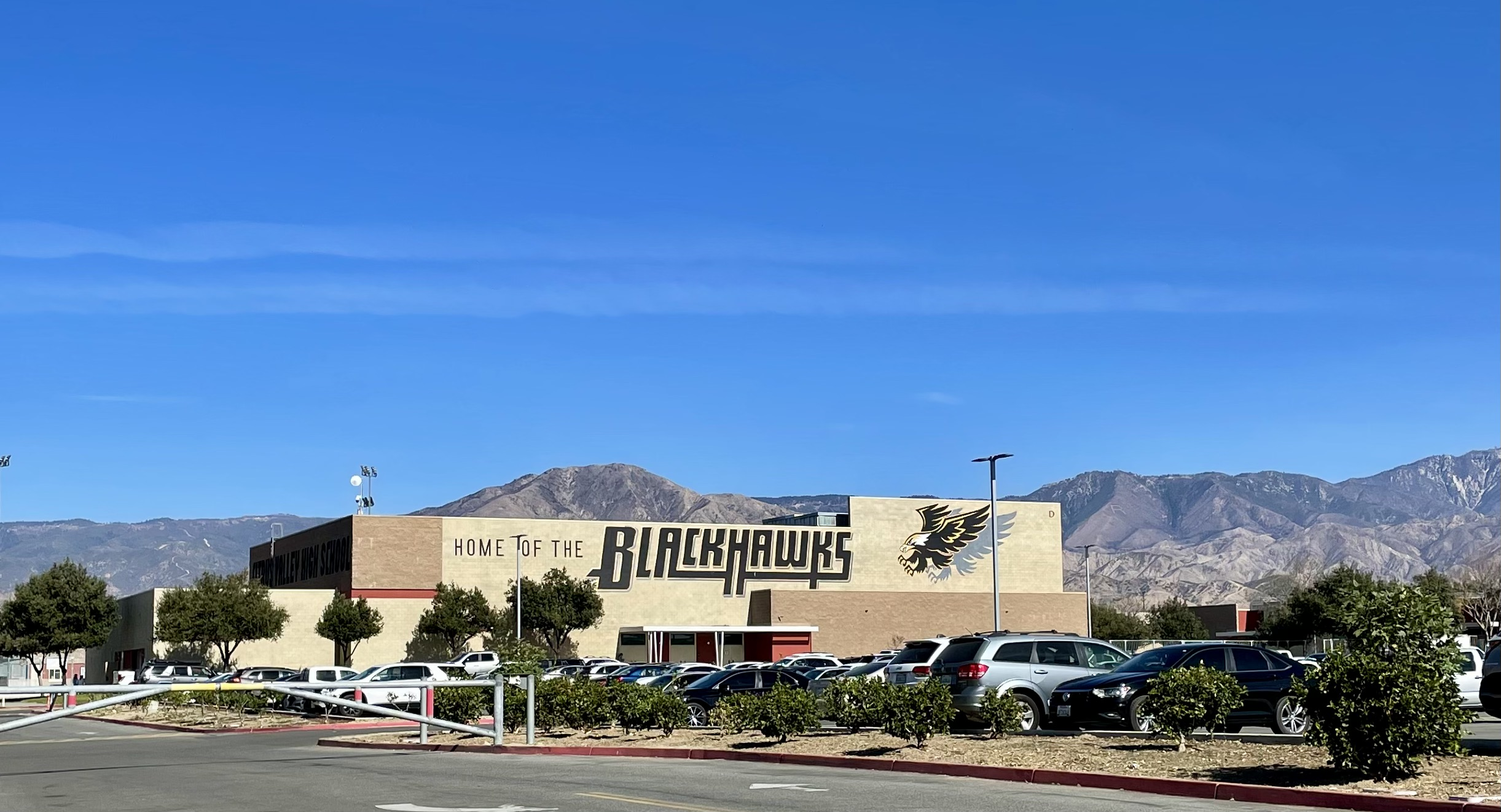
Redlands Citrus Valley High School Gym. Redlands "R" in the distance.

== Athletics ==
A variety of sports are offered at Citrus Valley High School. The school joined the Citrus Belt League in 2014. Among those included are wrestling, boys and girls basketball, football, boys and girls water polo, swimming, tennis, badminton, track and field, golf, baseball, softball, boys and girls volleyball, and cross country. They also have a robotics team that went undefeated in its first regular season during 2013 and qualified to enter the VEX Robotics World Championship in Anaheim, CA.
