= Rialto Unified School District =

Public school district in Rialto, California

Address
- 182 East Walnut Avenue Rialto, California, 92376; United States

District information
- Type: Public
- Grades: K through 12
- Superintendent: Judy D. White
- NCES District ID: 0632370

Students and staff
- Students: 24,461 (2020–2021)
- Teachers: 998.97 (FTE)
- Staff: 1,251.42 (FTE)
- Student–teacher ratio: 24.49:1

Other information
- Website: kec.rialto.k12.ca.us/kec

Rialto Unified School District is a school district in San Bernardino County, California, serving most of Rialto, sections of Colton, Fontana and San Bernardino, and the census-designated place of Lytle Creek.

The school district has about 26,485 students, 3,800 staff, and a budget of about $200 million.

== History ==
The district's first schoolhouse, which opened in 1888, was a part of the Brooke School District. The Rialto school district was formed out of the Brooke district on April 9, 1891.

== Holocaust writing assignment controversy ==
In 2014, Rialto Unified attracted national criticism after it gave its roughly 2,000 eighth-grade students an argumentative writing assignment asking them to determine, based on their research, whether the Holocaust was "an actual event in history, or merely a political scheme created to influence public emotion and gain wealth". The assignment had been written by a team of the district's eighth-grade language arts teachers and cleared its Educational Services Department before being given out in April under interim superintendent Mohammad Z. Islam. The accompanying source packet included printed material from a Holocaust denial website.

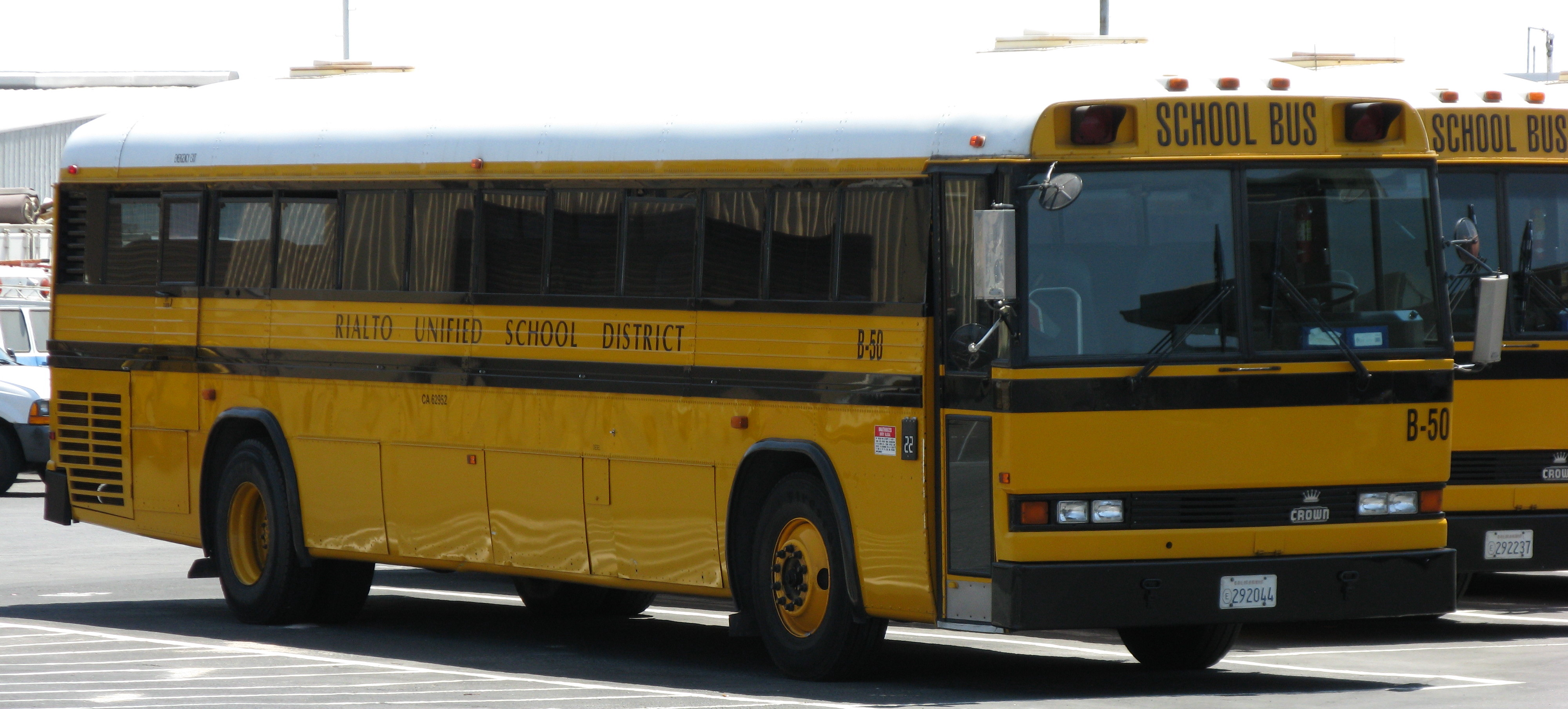
Crown Coach Supercoach II, Rialto Unified School District

After The San Bernardino Sun reporter Beau Yarbrough broke the story in May 2014, the Anti-Defamation League and the Simon Wiesenthal Center condemned the prompt. District spokeswoman Syeda Jafri initially defended it as a Common Core critical-thinking exercise, but at an emergency meeting the school board, through its president Joanne Gilbert, apologized and called the assignment "horribly inappropriate". The district revised its assignment-review process, sent the eighth-graders and their teachers to the Museum of Tolerance in Los Angeles, and provided sensitivity training for teachers. Islam and Jafri received death threats that police traced to a man in Connecticut.

A follow-up investigation by the Sun found that, contrary to the district's initial claims, at least 50 of the students' essays denied or doubted that the Holocaust occurred.

== Elementary schools ==
- Levi Bemis Elementary School Bobcats
- J. Calvin Boyd Elementary School Bulldogs
- Merle S. Casey Elementary School Cougars
- Sam V. Curtis Elementary School Colts
- Helen L. Dollahan Elementary School Dalmatians
- George H. Dunn Elementary School Dolphins
- Dr. Edward M. Fitzgerald Elementary School Foxes
- Dr. Ernest Garcia Elementary School Grizzlies
- Lida M. Henry Elementary School Hawks
- Elizabeth T. Hughbanks Elementary School Huskies
- J. P. Kelley Elementary School Koalas
- A. H. Morgan Elementary School Mustangs
- Georgia F. Morris Elementary School Mountain Lions
- W. A. Myers Elementary School Dragons
- Lena M. Preston Elementary School Panthers
- Samuel W. Simpson Elementary School Seahawks
- W. J. C. Trapp Elementary School Timberwolves
- Nancy R. Kordyak Elementary School Cubs
- Charlotte Nan Werner Elementary School, opening July 2008, named after an area mother

== Middle schools ==
- Warren H. Frisbie Middle School Falcons
- William G. Jehue Middle School Jaguars
- Ben F. Kolb Middle School Cougars
- Ethel Kucera Middle School Coyotes
- Rialto Middle School Tigers

== High schools ==
- Wilmer Amina Carter High School Lions
- Eisenhower High School Eagles
- Rialto High School (San Bernardino) Knights
- Dr. John Milor High School Mustangs
- Charles Zupanic High School
