= Kenny Clark (defensive tackle) =

American football player (born 1995)

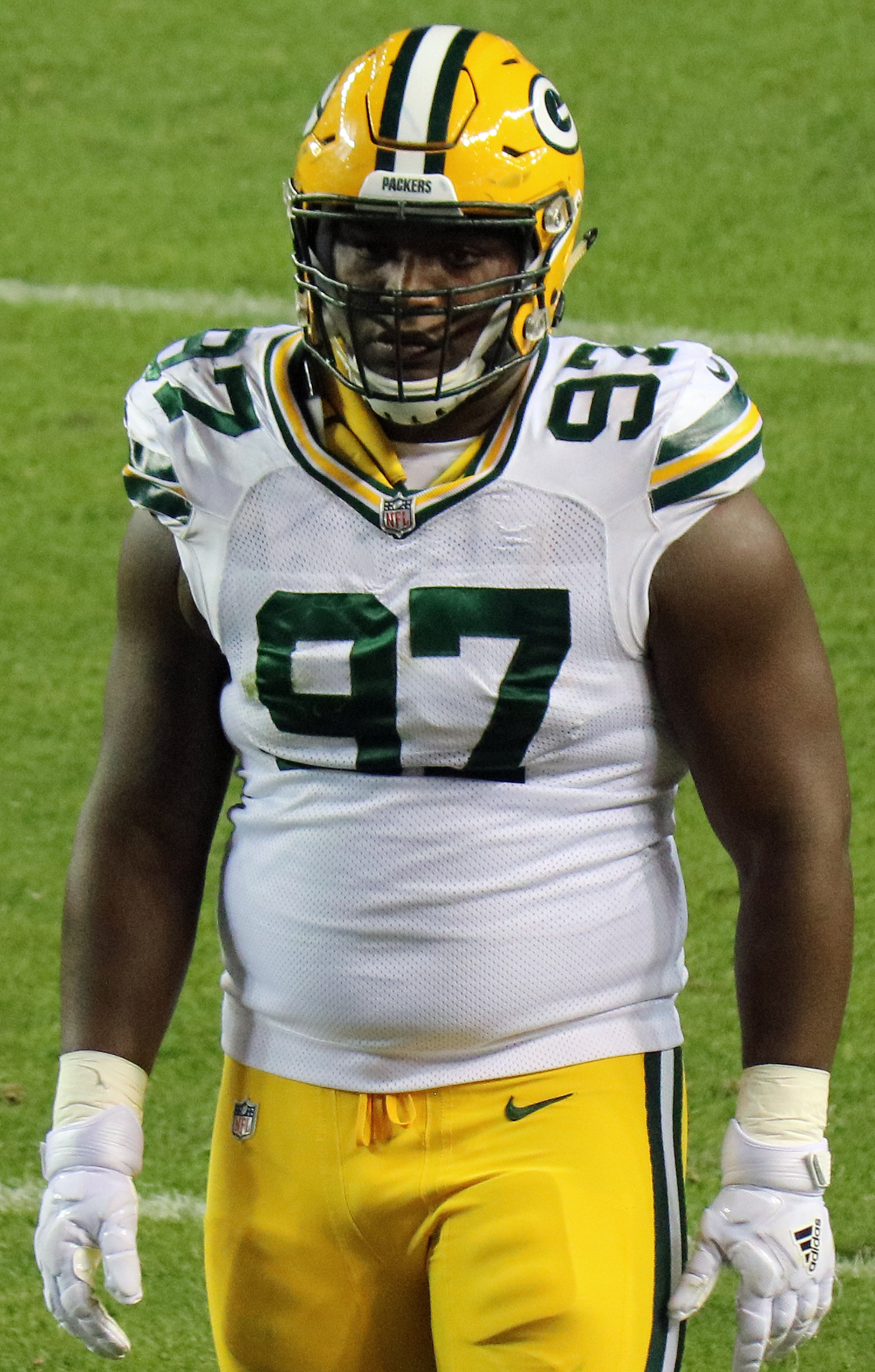
- Clark with the Green Bay Packers in 2017

No. 97 – Dallas Cowboys
- Position: Defensive tackle
- Roster status: Active

Personal information
- Born: October 4, 1995 (age 31); San Bernardino, California, U.S.
- Listed height: 6 ft 3 in (1.91 m)
- Listed weight: 314 lb (142 kg)

Career information
- High school: Carter (Rialto, California)
- College: UCLA (2013–2015)
- NFL draft: 2016: 1st round, 27th overall pick

Career history
- Green Bay Packers (2016–2024); Dallas Cowboys (2025–present)

Awards and highlights
- 3× Pro Bowl (2019, 2021, 2023); Third-team All-American (2015); First-team All-Pac-12 (2015); Second-team All-Pac-12 (2014)

Career NFL statistics as of Week 5, 2026
- Total tackles: 465
- Sacks: 38.0
- Forced fumbles: 7
- Fumble recoveries: 8
- Pass deflections: 12
- Stats at Pro Football Reference

Kenneth Duane Clark Jr. (born October 4, 1995) is an American professional football defensive tackle for the Dallas Cowboys of the National Football League (NFL). Playing college football for the UCLA Bruins, he was named a third-team All-American as a junior in 2015, when he also earned his second all-conference selection in the Pac-12. He was selected by the Green Bay Packers in the first round of the 2016 NFL draft, with the 27th overall pick.

== Early life ==
Clark was born and raised in San Bernardino, California. He attended Wilmer Amina Carter High School in Rialto, California. As a senior, he had 71 tackles and 11 sacks. He was rated by Rivals.com as a four-star recruit and committed to the University of California, Los Angeles (UCLA) to play college football. Clark also wrestled in high school.

== College career ==
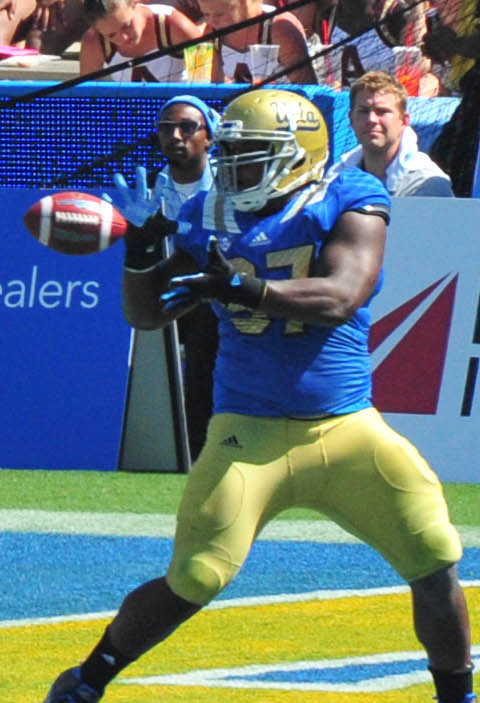
Clark catching a touchdown pass for UCLA in 2015

Clark appeared in all 13 games as a true freshman at UCLA in 2013. He started four games and had 31 tackles. As a sophomore in 2014, Clark was a second-team All-Pac-12 Conference selection after starting all 13 games and making 58 tackles. Already established as a strong run defender, he improved as a pass rusher as a junior after entering 2015 with just one career sack. He had a career-high three sacks against Washington State. He was named third-team All-American by the Associated Press and was the lone Bruin named first-team All-Pac-12. Clark had a career-high 11 tackles in the Foster Farms Bowl against Nebraska, and ranked second on the team with 75 tackles and six sacks. After the season, he decided to forgo his senior year and enter the 2016 NFL draft.

== Professional career ==
Pre-draft measurables
Height	Weight	Arm length	Hand span	Wingspan	40-yard dash	10-yard split	20-yard split	20-yard shuttle	Vertical jump	Broad jump	Bench press	Wonderlic
6 ft 2 5/8 in (1.90 m)	314 lb (142 kg)	32 1/8 in (0.82 m)	10 1/2 in (0.27 m)	6 ft 7 in (2.01 m)	5.06 s	1.72 s	2.90 s	4.62 s	28.5 in (0.72 m)	8 ft 6 in (2.59 m)	29 reps	16
All values are from NFL Combine

=== Green Bay Packers ===
Clark was selected in the first round (27th overall) by the Green Bay Packers in the 2016 NFL Draft.

On July 17, 2016, the Green Bay Packers signed Clark to a four-year, $9.36 million contract with $7.18 million guaranteed and a signing bonus of $5.00 million.

He began his rookie season as a starting defensive tackle alongside veteran Mike Daniels. He was also named a backup and rotational defensive end in the Packers' 3–4 defense.

Clark made his professional debut in the Packers' season opener against the Jacksonville Jaguars and made one assisted tackle in the 27–23 victory. On September 25, 2016, he made his first career start against the Detroit Lions and racked up a total of four tackles in the Packer's win. In Week 14, Clark made four combined tackles during a 38–10 victory against the Seattle Seahawks. As a rookie in 2016, Clark finished with 21 tackles and two passes defended in 16 games.

In Week 13 of the 2017 season, Clark recorded 1.5 sacks, his first of his NFL career and 6 combined tackles in a 26–20 overtime win over the Tampa Bay Buccaneers. He finished the season with 4.5 sacks and 55 tackles.

Clark had a breakout season in 2018, recording 55 tackles, three passes defensed, and six sacks, and was named a Pro Bowl alternate. He suffered an elbow injury in Week 14 and was placed on injured reserve on December 25, 2018.

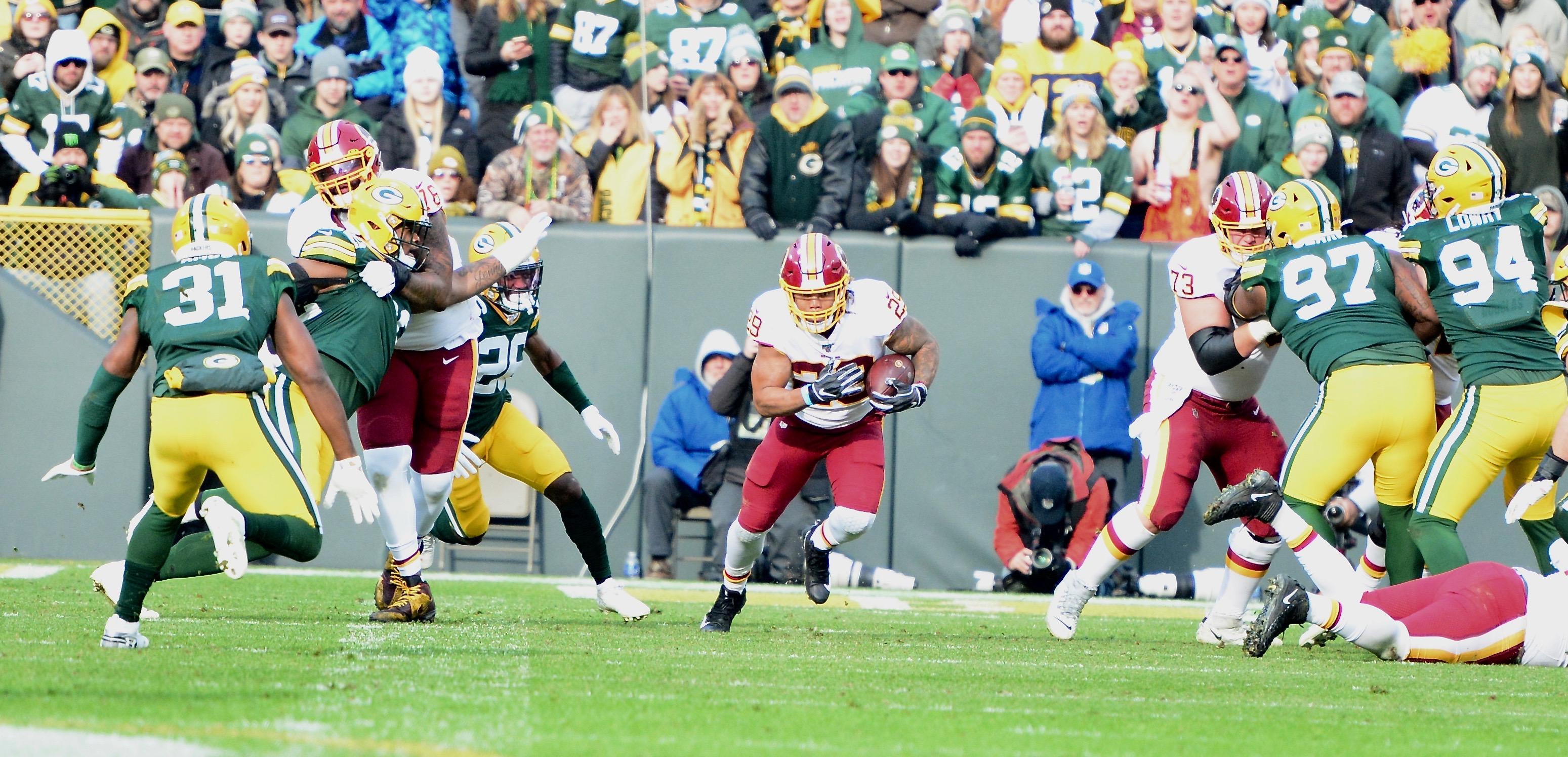
Clark in a game against the Washington Redskins

On April 22, 2019, the Packers picked up the fifth-year option on Clark's contract.

On August 15, 2020, Clark signed a four-year, $70 million contract extension with a $25 million signing bonus. In the Divisional Round of the playoffs against the Los Angeles Rams, Clark recorded 1.5 sacks on Jared Goff during the 32–18 win. On December 23, 2021, Clark was named to his second Pro Bowl.

On February 23, 2022, Clark agreed to a restructured deal that converted $13.6 million into a signing bonus to save $10.9 million of salary cap space.

On January 30, 2024, Clark was selected to the 2024 Pro Bowl Games, replacing San Francisco 49ers defensive tackle Javon Hargrave due to him participating in Super Bowl LVIII. This was his third Pro Bowl selection.

On July 21, 2024, Clark signed a three-year, $64 million contract extension with the Packers.

=== Dallas Cowboys ===
On August 28, 2025, Clark was traded to the Dallas Cowboys along with two first-round picks (2026 and 2027), in exchange for Micah Parsons.

== NFL career statistics ==
Legend
**Bold**	Career high

=== Regular season ===
Season	Team	GP	GS	Total	Solo	Ast	Sck	TFL	QBHits	Prss	FF	FR	PD
2016	GB	16	2	21	13	8	0.0	1	4	6	0	**2**	2
2017	GB	15	15	55	32	23	4.5	6	6	21	**2**	0	1
2018	GB	13	13	55	**36**	19	6.0	8	9	15	1	**2**	**3**
2019	GB	16	16	**62**	31	**31**	6.0	**9**	7	15	1	0	1
2020	GB	13	13	42	28	14	2.0	3	6	12	0	0	0
2021	GB	16	16	48	27	21	4.0	6	**13**	**28**	0	1	0
2022	GB	17	17	53	27	26	4.0	5	10	17	1	1	0
2023	GB	17	17	44	22	22	**7.5**	**9**	6	25	**2**	0	**3**
2024	GB	17	17	37	20	17	1.0	4	5	11	0	**2**	2
2025	DAL	17	17	36	17	19	3.0	6	9	15	0	0	0
2026	DAL	5	5	12	4	8	0.0	0	2	0	0	0	0
Career		162	148	465	257	208	38.0	57	87	140	7	8	12

=== Postseason ===
Season	Team	GP	GS	Total	Solo	Ast	Sck	TFL	QBHits	FF	FR	PD
2016	GB	3	0	6	5	1	0.0	**2**	2	0	0	0
2019	GB	2	2	6	5	1	1.0	1	1	0	0	0
2020	GB	2	2	**11**	**6**	**5**	**2.5**	**2**	**3**	0	0	0
2021	GB	1	1	6	4	2	1.0	1	2	0	0	0
2023	GB	2	2	7	4	3	0.5	1	2	0	0	0
2024	GB	1	1	5	2	3	0.0	0	0	0	0	0
Career		11	8	41	26	15	5.0	7	10	0	0	0
