= Yucaipa High School =

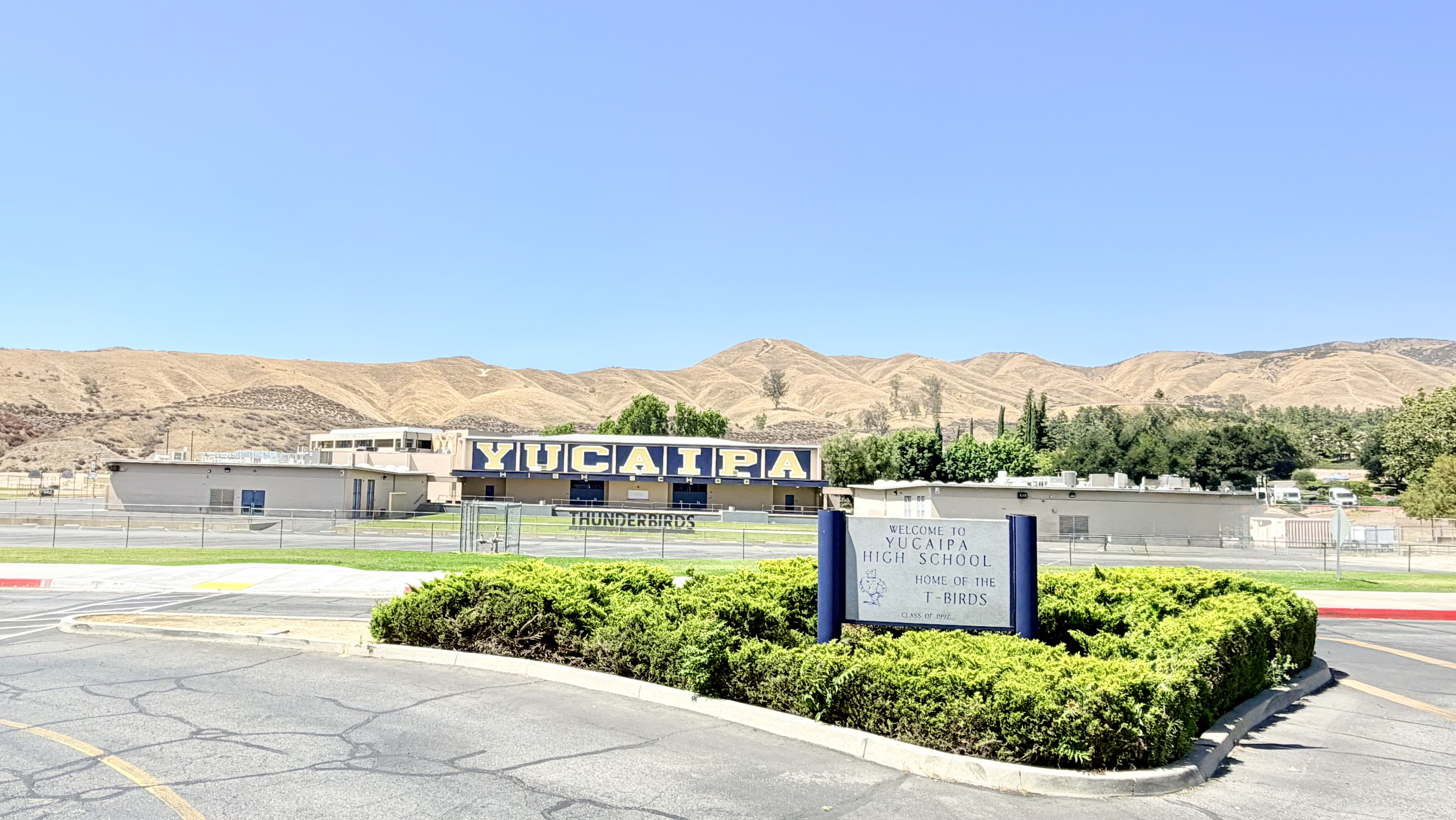

Location
- 33000 Yucaipa Boulevard; Yucaipa, California 92399; United States; 34°01′44″N 117°03′38″W

Information
- Type: Public
- Established: 1958; 68 years ago
- School district: Yucaipa-Calimesa Joint Unified School District
- Principal: Shad Kirkland
- Teaching staff: 113.75 (FTE)
- Grades: 9–12
- Enrollment: 2,755 (2024-2025)
- Student to teacher ratio: 24.22
- Colors: Navy and gold
- Mascot: Thunderbird
- Website: Official website

Yucaipa High School is a public high school in Yucaipa, California, United States that serves the cities of Yucaipa and Calimesa and the community of Oak Glen, 65 miles east of Los Angeles.

== History ==
The original Yucaipa High School campus is now used as the Oak View High School and Education Center. The campus moved to its current location on Yucaipa Blvd. in 1970 and now houses grades 9–12. The 50th Anniversary of Yucaipa High was celebrated in 2009 at the Yucaipa High School 9th Grade Campus (now OVEC) on 6th St. in Yucaipa, CA.

== Design and structures ==
The Yucaipa High School campus consists of the A, C, D, E, F, G, H, I, L, M, N, O, P, and Q buildings, Multi-Purpose Room, Gymnasium, and Boys and Girls Locker Rooms. In the summer of 2007, a new artificial turf football field was completed.

== Student publications ==
The student-produced news magazine, The Epigraph, has been published and distributed by the Journalism class since August 2000.

== Sports ==
Yucaipa recently joined the Citrus Belt League.

=== Fall Season (September–November) ===
- Football
- Girls Volleyball
- Cross Country Running
- Girls Tennis
- Boys Water Polo
- Girls Golf
- Cheerleading

=== Winter Season (December–February) ===
- Girls Water Polo
- Boys Basketball
- Girls Basketball
- Boys Soccer
- Girls Soccer
- Wrestling
- Cheerleading

=== Spring Season (March–May) ===
- Golf
- Baseball
- Softball
- Badminton
- Boys Track and Field
- Girls Track and Field
- Boys Swimming
- Girls Swimming
- Boys Tennis
- Boys Volleyball
- Cheerleading

== Notable alumni ==
- Susan Anton – Actress, Miss California 1969
- Matt Carson – MLB Player the Oakland Athletics
- Matt Davidson – MLB player for the Arizona Diamondbacks
- Corky Miller – MLB player for the Cincinnati Reds Minnesota Twins Boston Red Sox Atlanta Braves Chicago White Sox
- Jacob Reimer - baseball player in the New York Mets organization
- Brett Roy -- NFL player for the New York Jets
- Mark Teahen – MLB Player for the Toronto Blue Jays Kansas City Royals Chicago White Sox
- Taijuan Walker – MLB player for the New York Mets
- Tyler Wells – MLB player for the Baltimore Orioles
