= Yucaipa-Calimesa Joint Unified School District =

Public school district serving San Bernardino and Riverside Counties, California

Address
- 12797 Third Street Yucaipa, California, 92320; United States

District information
- Type: Public
- Grades: K through 12
- NCES District ID: 0643560

Students and staff
- Students: 8,551 (2022-2023)
- Teachers: 369.96 (FTE)
- Staff: 415.91 (FTE)
- Student–teacher ratio: 22.93:1 (2022-2023)

Other information
- Website: www.yucaipaschools.com

Yucaipa-Calimesa Joint Unified School District is a school district serving Yucaipa (an incorporated area of San Bernardino County) and Calimesa (an incorporated area of Riverside County), in California, United States.

The Riverside County portion includes much of Calimesa and a portion of Cherry Valley. The San Bernardino County portion includes Yucaipa, most of the Oak Glen census-designated place, and portions of Redlands.

It has many schools: Calimesa Elementary School, Wildwood Elementary School, Chapman Heights Elementary School, Parkview Middle School, Mesa View Middle School, Yucaipa High School, and many others.
