= Sunkist League =

High school athletic league

The Sunkist League is a high school athletic league that is part of the CIF Southern Section. Members are located in western San Bernardino County. The Sunkist League is now a part of the Arrowhead Athletic Conference. The conference has 3 leagues, San Andreas League, Sunkist League, and Skyline League. All 15 schools for boys and girls sports can move freely through the 3 leagues through means of competitive balance. The Arrowhead Athletic Conference was initially founded with schools that included the San Andreas League, the Sunkist League, and Wilmer Amina Carter High School during the 2020-2021 school year. Notre Dame High School was later added for the 2022-2023 school year from the Raincross Conference.

== Members ==
- Bloomington High School
- Colton High School
- Fontana High School
- Grand Terrace High School
- Kaiser High School
- Summit High School
- Wilmer Amina Carter High School
