= Arrowhead Christian Academy =

Location
- Redlands, California; United States; 34°03′11″N 117°12′03″W

Information
- Type: Private Christian high school
- Website: www.redlandschristian.org

Arrowhead Christian Academy is a private Christian high school located in Redlands, California, United States.

== History and campus ==
Co-founded in 1979 by Dr. Larry W. Poland and Gordon Shipps, Arrowhead Christian Academy consists of grades 9-12 and is based on incorporating Christian teachings and ideals into all aspects of education.

Arrowhead Christian Academy has been accredited by the WASC (Western Association of Schools and Colleges) since July 1996. ACA is a member of the Association of Christian Schools International (ACSI).

The main campus building (originally a large hosiery factory) houses junior high and high school classrooms, a science wing with computer centers, a main computer lab and a gymnasium/multipurpose auditorium. It includes a Library Research Media Center with 24 workstations, along with research materials and books. Sports facilities include athletic fields, an exercise building (the "Barn"), and the 20,000-square-foot (1,900 m^{2}) Eagle Arena with three full courts. In 2004, a 5-acre (20,000 m^{2}) soccer field was completed which contains three full-size practice fields as well as one competition field. In 2010, five additional acres adjacent to the school were purchased in preparation for expansion of the campus. The North Campus is home to the Center for the Arts Facility with classrooms for music and visual arts. The school hosts a sports program with several teams earning CIF titles.

In 2008 ACA collaborated with Redlands Christian School to create a comprehensive Christian school system serving Redlands and the surrounding municipalities. The combined enrollment is over 1,000 students.

== Academics ==
Arrowhead Christian Academy offers Advanced Placement and Honors Classes in subjects such as Philosophy and Theology, Lab Sciences, Mathematics, Language and Literature, and Social Studies.

Arrowhead Christian Academy has received awards and recognition for academic excellence. Students have been awarded various forms of the AP Scholar Award.

ACA graduates have attended colleges such as Yale University, Harvard University, Stanford University, Cornell University, UCLA, UC Berkeley, United States Naval Academy, United States Military Academy, and Columbia University.

== Arts and journalism ==
"Wings"
ACA’s yearbook, Wings, has gained national honors for the past 20 years under the direction of adviser Crystal Kazmierski (JEA National Yearbook Adviser of the Year, 2000) who no longer is at ACA. National awards include multiple Columbia Scholastic Press Association's Gold and Silver Crowns , the National Scholastic Press Association's National Pacemaker Award and the University of Iowa's Quill and Scroll. "Wings" is added to the president's collection at Walsworth Publishing yearly and consistently pushes the envelope in the scholastic journalism world. In April 2006 "Wings" was inducted into the NSPA Hall of Fame for having earned 10 consecutive All-American ratings in their annual critique service.

Cambiata
ACA's high school choir performs annually at the ACSI Musicale in Pasadena, California. Under the direction of Elizabeth Van Gelder (1991–1998), Ellen Beery (1998–2004), Ruth Goodman (2005–2006) and Nancy Gilmore (2006–2011), they have participated in many choral-related events with the Kerygma Honor Choir.

Kerygma
ACA's honor choir has won a gold or silver award at the invitational Heritage Festival at Disneyland in Anaheim, CA annually since 2004. Kerygma competes each year as a small ensemble at ASCI musicale and has participated at local venues under Elizabeth Van Gelder (1994–1999), Ellen Beery (1999–2004), Ruth Goodman (2004–2005) and Nancy Gilmore (2005–2011). On March 23, 2007, the entire music department (Kerygma, Cambiata, and the Drum Line/Percussions Studies groups) attended the Heritage Festival in Anaheim.

Competition	Result (medal awarded)
2005 Heritage Festival	Silver
2006 Heritage Festival	Silver
2007 Heritage Festival	Silver
2008 Heritage Festival	Gold
2009 Heritage Festival	Gold
2010 Heritage Festival	Gold

Drama
Audience seating is set up for theatre-in-the-round productions. Plays are performed such as Steel Magnolias, The Glass Menagerie, All in the Timing, The Mousetrap, The Bad Seed, The Unexpected Guest, Black Comedy, 'Art', Play On and The Curious Savage. Students are coached by Crystal Kazmierski and Nathan Smith. Former directors include Wes Harty and Steve Smith. Boo Rivera headed the Middle School Drama Dept from 1995-2006 Directing the Annual MS Musical and including the High School Musical "Guys and Dolls" in 2000.

Drum line/percussion studies
In 2005, ACA introduced Drum Line classes under director Chris McDonal. Drum Line and Percussion Studies perform at school concerts and sporting events. Arrowhead Drum Line has won the gold in the 1A Category for the 2nd year in a row.

Competition	Result (medal awarded)
2006 Heritage Festival	Silver
2007 Heritage Festival	Silver
2008 Heritage Festival	Gold
2009 Heritage Festival	Gold

== Cirque du ACA ==
A fund-raising opportunity called the "Diamond Jubilee" was introduced in 2008. Held at the Orange Show in San Bernardino, the evening event included a sit-down dinner, live and silent auctions and entertainment.

In 2010 the Diamond Jubilee was replaced with Cirque du ACA, a fundraiser with a carnival atmosphere. It included a silent auction, a live auction, entertainment in the form of dramatic and musical pieces, a performance by the YMCA Circus and bounce houses. These fundraisers will help ACA with expenditures such as improving campus facilities and donations to organizations in the Inland Empire.

== The International Student Program ==
Arrowhead Christian provides an International Student Program for kids from other countries to come and study in the United States. Many international students find a host student (student that attends ACA) and the international student lives with the host student for the entire year.

International student country	Population at school (percent all-time)
Korean	Approx. 10%
Chinese	Approx. 90%

- These percents are only applicable to the international student population at ACA.
