= Rialto High School =

Public high school in Rialto, California

Location
- 595 South Eucalyptus Avenue; San Bernardino, California 92376; United States; 34°05′29″N 117°21′23″W

Information
- Type: Public
- Established: September 1992
- School district: Rialto Unified School District
- Principal: Caroline Sweeney
- Teaching staff: 116.16 (on FTE basis)
- Grades: 9 to 12
- Enrollment: 2,747 (2023-2024)
- Student to teacher ratio: 23.65
- Colors: Blue, Silver and White
- Athletics conference: San Andreas League
- Mascot: Knight
- Team name: Rialto Knights
- Newspaper: The Medieval Times
- Website: rialtohigh.rialto.k12.ca.us

Rialto High School is a public high school located in San Bernardino, California, with a Rialto postal address. that opened in September 1992.

== Notable alumni ==
- Lonyae Miller – NFL running back, Dallas Cowboys #35, transferred out of Rialto as a junior
- Ryan Grice-Mullen – CFL wide receiver who originally signed with Houston Texans and Chicago Bears as undrafted free agent; played for the University of Hawaii, where he earned All-WAC accolades
- Ricky Nolasco – MLB pitcher drafted out of high school, spent 12 years in the majors.
- Josh Whitesell – MLB first baseman

== Former principals ==
- Anna Rodriguez (1992–2003)
- Miguel Elias (2003–05)
- Mehran Akhtarkhavari (2005–08)
- Andres Luna (2008–2011)
- Albert Castillo (2011–2013)
- Arnie Ayala (2013–2019)
- Caroline Sweeney (2019–present)
