= Beaumont Unified School District =

Public school district in Riverside County, California

Address
- 350 West Brookside Avenue Beaumont, California, 92223; United States
- Coordinates: 33°57′44″N 116°59′06″W

District information
- Type: Public
- Grades: K–12
- Superintendent: Mays Kakish
- NCES District ID: 0604290

Students and staff
- Students: 10,694 (2020–2021)
- Teachers: 427.62 (FTE)
- Staff: 456.86 (FTE)
- Student–teacher ratio: 25.01:1

Other information
- Website: www.beaumontusd.us

Beaumont Unified School District is located in central Riverside County, California. The district services the vast majority of Beaumont, California, as well as portions of Banning, and most of Calimesa and the census-designated place of Cherry Valley. It extends into San Bernardino County, where it includes a portion of Oak Glen CDP.

== History ==
The first public school classes in Beaumont started in 1884, the year the town was founded. The first school house was built the following year in the Olivewood neighborhood. In 1909, a second school was built in the Cherry Valley neighborhood. The first high school classes were also in 1909, but the first high school building wasn't completed until 1911.

The schools in the area were later unified as the San Gorgonio Unified School District. The Beaumont Unified School District came into existence in 2004 when the previous district (Banning and Beaumont Unified School District) split apart.

== Schools ==
Today there are sixteen active schools in the Beaumont Unified School District:

Elementary schools

- Anna M. House Elementary
- Brookside Elementary
- Palm Innovation Academy
- Star Light Elementary
- Sundance Elementary
- Three Rings Ranch Elementary
- Tournament Hills Elementary

Middle & high schools

- Mountain View Middle
- San Gorgonio Middle
- Beaumont Senior High
- Glen View High (Continuation)
- Beaumont Middle College High School

Other Beaumont school sites

- 21st Century Learning Institute
- Beaumont Adult School
- Beaumont USD Preschool
- Summerwind Trails K-8

=== Beaumont Middle College High School ===
Beaumont Middle College High School (BMCHS) is a public high school on the grounds of San Gorgonio Pass Campus of Mount San Jacinto College, in Banning, California. A joint project of the school district and the community college district, the school functions as an early college school. The school and community college districts enacted their agreement to create this school in January 2022, and the school itself opened in August of that year.

BMCHS as it is locally known as, is only home to grades 10-12th and provides early college education for High Schoolers seeking an Associates degree at no cost. However, an Associates Degree is only achievable if extra classes are taken and if the student was admitted to the school first semester of their sophomore year. The aim of the school is to prepare High School students in the Beaumont and Banning area to complete their IGETC requirements for any college and career paths they would so choose in their future.
