= West Valley High School (Hemet, California) =

Location
- 3401 Mustang Way; Hemet, California 92545; United States; 33°43′10″N 117°0′34″W

Information
- Type: Public High School
- School district: Hemet Unified School District
- Principal: Gerardo Zavala
- Teaching staff: 84.42 (FTE)
- Enrollment: 1,818 (2023–2024)
- Student to teacher ratio: 21.54
- Colors: Maroon and gray
- Mascot: Mustang
- Website: www.wvhsmustangs.net

West Valley High School is a high school that serves around 1,800 students on the western side of Hemet, California. The school is accredited by the WASC Accrediting Commission for Schools and also has become an AVID Demonstration School. The West Valley High School mascot is a Mustang.

== History ==
West Valley High School was created in 1989 to accommodate the growing population of Hemet, California. The student and teacher population of Hemet Junior High (closed in 1990) worked to create a name, mascot and colors (maroon and gray) for the school. West Valley opened in the fall of 1990 to freshman and sophomores only. It expanded to Juniors the following year and graduated its first class of Seniors on June 17, 1993.

The school moved to a brand new facility on the west end of Hemet in 1996. In 2006 the football field was upgraded to artificial turf and the originally planned pool was also completed. In 2017 the football field underwent renovations.

West Valley High School offers the International Baccalaureate program otherwise known as "IB".

== Notable alumni ==
- Joe Burton (2009), basketball player
