= Oak Glen, San Bernardino County, California =

Oak Glen, California
- census-designated place
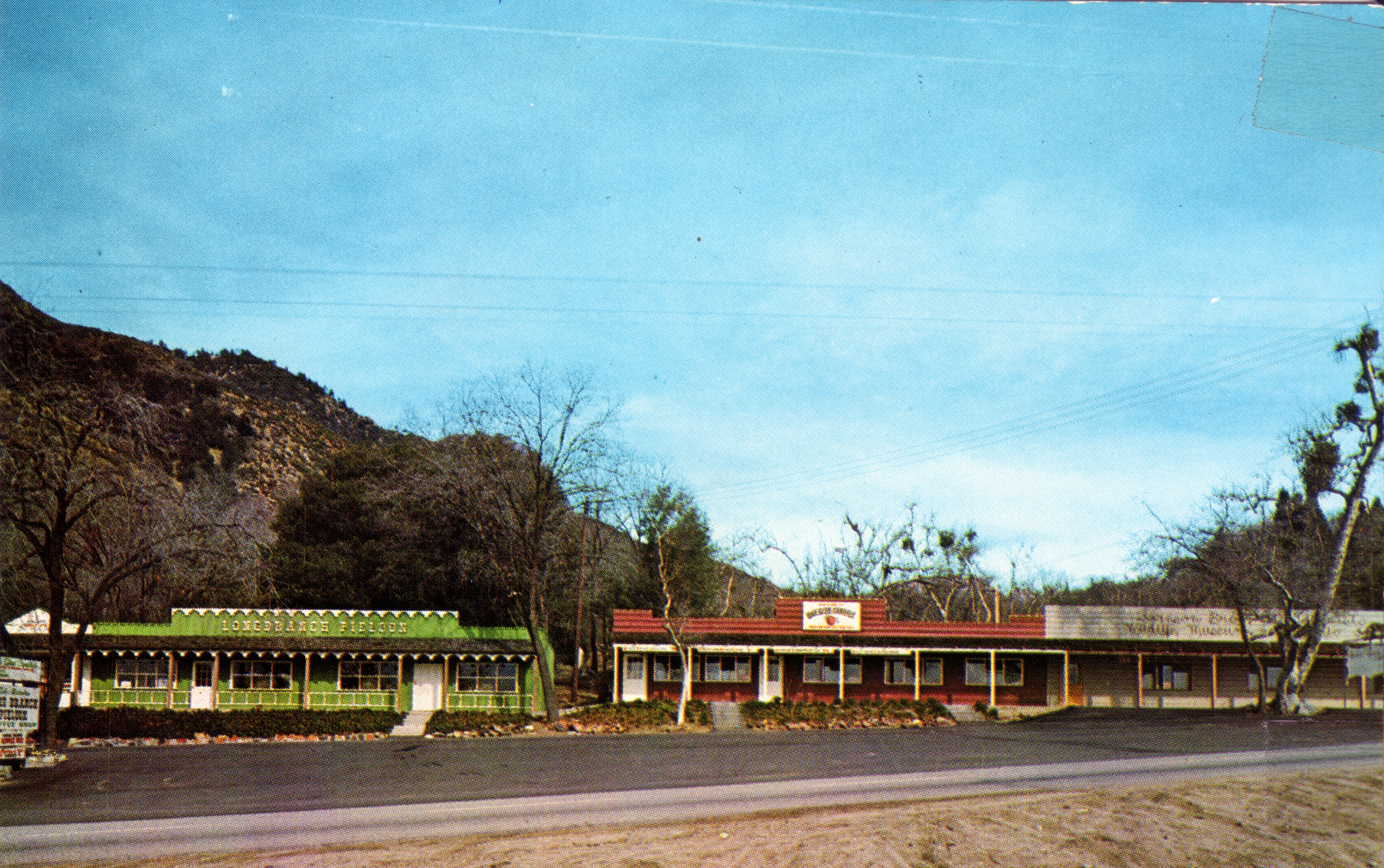
- Rustic storefronts in Oak Glen, California

- Location in San Bernardino County and the state of California

- Location within the state of California Oak Glen, California (California) Oak Glen, California (the United States)
- Coordinates: 34°02′42″N 116°56′58″W
- Country: United States
- State: California
- County: San Bernardino

Area
  - Total: 15.000 sq mi (38.851 km^{2})
  - Land: 14.996 sq mi (38.840 km^{2})
  - Water: 0.0042 sq mi (0.011 km^{2}) 0.03%
- Elevation: 4,734 ft (1,443 m)

Population (2020)
  - Total: 602
  - Density: 40.1/sq mi (15.5/km^{2})
- Time zone: UTC-8 (Pacific (PST))
  - Summer (DST): UTC-7 (PDT)
- ZIP code: 92399
- Area code: 909
- GNIS feature ID: 2583099

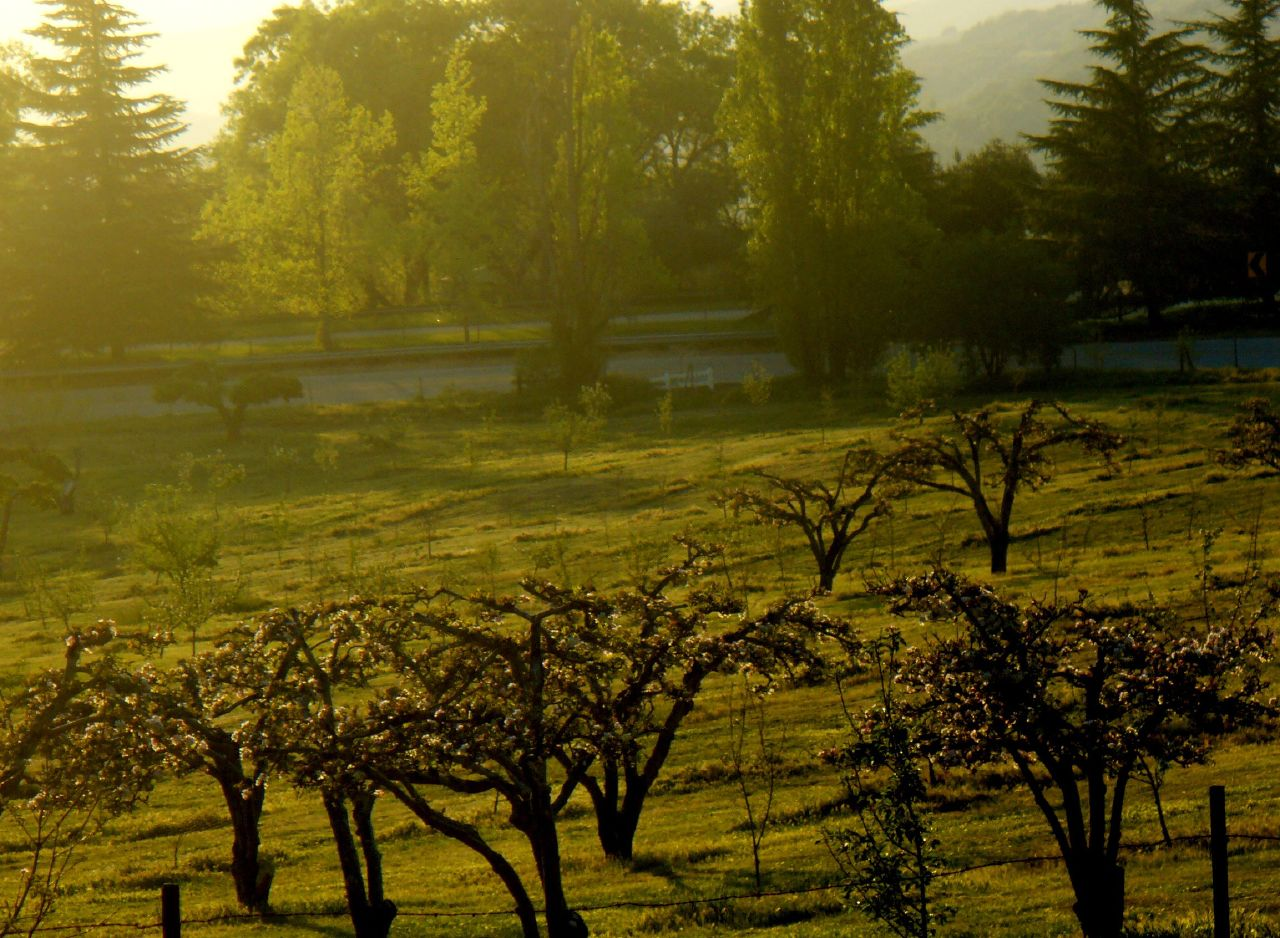
One of Oak Glen's apple orchards

Oak Glen is a census-designated place situated within the San Bernardino Mountains in San Bernardino County, California, United States. Oak Glen is located 15 miles east of San Bernardino, at an elevation of 4,734 feet (1,443 m). The population was 602 at the 2020 census.

The original settlers, the Cahuilla and the Serrano, harvested acorns; many metates can still be found in the streambeds where the acorns were leached. According to Huell Howser's 2005 California's Gold profile, the potato was the original crop grown by the first Caucasians to settle in the area.

The apple orchards produce many varieties of apples including antique varieties no longer widely commercially available such as Ben Davis, Gravenstein, and Pink Pearl.

Although Oak Glen grew apples mainly for export, in the 1940s several farms began to sell apples, apple pies, apple cider and apple butter at roadside stands. The export trade has virtually disappeared, and growers now earn much of their revenue from visitors who are allowed to pick apples directly off the trees at some of the orchards.

== History ==
Enoch Parrish opened the first apple orchard in 1876, followed by the Wilshire family. The Rivers brothers and their families came to Oak Glen in 1906. Their orchard, Los Rios Rancho (Spanish for "The Rivers Ranch"), is still in operation, as are many of the other original orchards and ranches in the area. The Law family came into the area with its own apple orchard in the early 1930s and built the first roadside packinghouse, first restaurant and gift shop soon after.

In 1996, The Wildlands Conservancy acquired Los Rios Rancho to ensure that the rural feel was retained. The orchard is leased for apple growing. The conservancy opened Oak Glen Preserve to the public providing hiking trails and picnic areas. They acquired additional land in the area particularly peaks to ensure the scenic backdrop persists. A large number of families visit Oak Glen for festivities and events offered by Los Rios Rancho and The Wildlands Conservancy.

Los Rios Rancho a 103-year-old apple ranch draws more than 300,000 visitors yearly. Joseph E. Wilshire, who helped make the Oak Glen area famous for apple growing in the early 1900s had realized early on the suitability of The Glen for growing apples and began buying land where with his brothers.

The original settlers to Oak Glen were the Cahuilla and the Serrano. They harvested acorns for survival in Oak Glen. The unique climate and elevation was perfect for growing large black acorns, a favorite among the locals. The evidence can still be found along the streambeds where the acorns were leached over 100 years ago. Although the main crop of Oak Glen was apples since the 1940s, it hasn't always been Oak Glen's only crop. The potato along with many other crops, were grown in Oak Glen since the 1890s. After several farms began to sell apples individually to visitors, along with homemade apple pies, fresh apple cider and delicious apple butter from roadside stands Oak Glen became an apple boom town overnight. The export trade has since virtually disappeared, and growers now earn much of their revenue from visitors who are allowed to pick the apples directly from the trees to insure freshness and the best quality. Today many of the heirloom varieties still exist today even though many of them have been since lost in time. Such varieties, which are grown only in Oak Glen, as well as many heirloom varieties no longer commercially available or are hard to find, such as the Arkansas Black and the Glen Seedling favorites among many. According to the Los Angeles Times, the town in Tamara Thorne's horror novel Moonfall is based on Oak Glen.

== Geography ==
According to the United States Census Bureau, the CDP covers an area of 15.0 square miles (38.9 km^{2}), 99.97% of it land, and 0.03% of it water.

== Demographics ==
Historical population
Census	Pop.	Note	%±
2010	638		—
2020	602		−5.6%
U.S. Decennial Census; 1850–1870 1880-1890; 1900 1910 1920; 1930 1940 1950; 1960 1970 1980; 1990 2000 2010

Oak Glen first appeared as a census designated place in the 2010 U.S. census.

The 2020 United States census reported that Oak Glen had a population of 602. The population density was 40.1 inhabitants per square mile (15.5/km^{2}). The racial makeup of Oak Glen was 421 (69.9%) White, 35 (5.8%) African American, 10 (1.7%) Native American, 10 (1.7%) Asian, 1 (0.2%) Pacific Islander, 62 (10.3%) from other races, and 63 (10.5%) from two or more races. Hispanic or Latino of any race were 114 persons (18.9%).

The census reported that 503 people (83.6% of the population) lived in households and 99 (16.4%) were institutionalized.

There were 193 households, out of which 65 (33.7%) had children under the age of 18 living in them, 127 (65.8%) were married-couple households, 10 (5.2%) were cohabiting couple households, 30 (15.5%) had a female householder with no partner present, and 26 (13.5%) had a male householder with no partner present. 23 households (11.9%) were one person, and 9 (4.7%) were one person aged 65 or older. The average household size was 2.61. There were 161 families (83.4% of all households).

The age distribution was 76 people (12.6%) under the age of 18, 56 people (9.3%) aged 18 to 24, 166 people (27.6%) aged 25 to 44, 169 people (28.1%) aged 45 to 64, and 135 people (22.4%) who were 65 years of age or older. The median age was 45.8 years. For every 100 females, there were 150.8 males.

There were 219 housing units at an average density of 14.6 units per square mile (5.6 units/km^{2}), of which 193 (88.1%) were occupied. Of these, 140 (72.5%) were owner-occupied, and 53 (27.5%) were occupied by renters.

According to the 2010 United States Census, Oak Glen had a median household income of $70,189, with none of the population living below the federal poverty line.

== Music ==
In recent years, Oak Glen has become a cultural hub for music and folk preservation, giving rise to such acclaimed groups as Cherryholmes and Wimberley Bluegrass Band.

== Education ==
Most of the CDP is in Yucaipa-Calimesa Joint Unified School District while some of it is in Beaumont Unified School District.
