= Wilmer Amina Carter High School =

Public high school in Rialto, California

Location
- 2630 N Linden Ave; Rialto, California 92377; United States; 34.148°N 117.403°W

Information
- Type: Public
- Motto: "Stay Hungry"
- Established: August 2004
- School district: Rialto Unified School District
- Teaching staff: 90.81 (FTE)
- Grades: 9 to 12
- Enrollment: 2,027 (2023-2024)
- Student to teacher ratio: 22.32
- Colors: Navy, Gold and White
- Athletics conference: Citrus Belt League
- Sports: Football, Baseball, Soccer, Softball, Wrestling, Track and Field, Cross Country, Tennis, SRLA, Swim, and Basketball.
- Mascot: Lion
- Team name: The Lions
- Newspaper: Lion News
- Website: carter.rialto.k12.ca.us

Wilmer Amina Carter High School is a high school located in Rialto, California, United States.

== Organization ==
The school is managed by the Rialto Unified School District. It was named for American politician Wilmer Carter and was the first high school in the Inland Empire named after a living African-American woman. The school's mascot is a lion and consequently, the athletics teams are called 'Lions'.

== History ==
School construction began in 2001 and the school opened (still unfinished) for the 2004–05 school year, with its first graduating class in 2005–06 school year.

== Facilities ==
The two-story facility has eighteen buildings and includes a football stadium that seats over 2,500, a performing arts theatre that accommodates over 800, a multipurpose room (MPR) that accommodates over 600, and a three full-court gymnasium with the capacity for 2,400 spectators.

Carter High School also has a joint-use County Public Library on its campus that is open for students to use throughout the school day and Monday through Thursday from 3:00 p.m. to 8:00 p.m. and on Saturdays from 8:00 a.m. to 4:00 p.m. In addition, CHS has a dedicated science building that includes four full science labs for hands-on lessons. The school has five full computer labs and a mobile computer lab that is used for English Learner (EL) instruction in the ELD III classroom.

== Notable alumni ==
- Kenny Clark (defensive tackle), NFL player with Green Bay Packers, alumni of UCLA, pick 27 of 2016 Draft
