= Moreno Valley High School (California) =

High school in California, United States

Coordinates: 33°55′31″N 117°15′22″W

Location
- 23300 Cottonwood Avenue; Moreno Valley, (Riverside County), California 92553; United States

Information
- Type: Public high school
- Principal: Steve Quintero
- Staff: 107.78 (FTE)
- Grades: 9-12
- Enrollment: 2,143 (2023-24)
- Student to teacher ratio: 19.88
- Colors: Navy and gold
- Nickname: Vikings
- Website: Moreno Valley High School

Moreno Valley High School is a High School located in Moreno Valley, California, United States. It is part of the Moreno Valley Unified School District.

== Notable achievements ==
In 2022, the school won a California PBIS Coalition Gold Award.

== Notable alumni ==
- Troy Percival, pitcher for St. Louis Cardinals and Anaheim Angels
- Bud Pierce, Oregon politician, graduated in 1974
- Michael Sorich: American actor, writer and director, a prominent and ever-present voice actor in the Power Rangers franchise, Graduated from Moreno Valley High School in 1975.
- Beverly Yanez, professional soccer player
