= San Gorgonio High School =

Location
- 2299 Pacific Street; San Bernardino, California 92404; United States; 34.1272673°N 117.2371096°W

Information
- School type: Senior High School
- Motto: "We Expect Excellence: Everyone, Everywhere, Everytime."
- Founded: 1965
- School district: San Bernardino City Unified School District
- Principal: Jorge De La Torre
- Teaching staff: 73.05 (FTE)
- Grades: 9-12
- Enrollment: 1,447 (2023-2024)
- Student to teacher ratio: 19.81
- Colors: Blue, black, and white
- Nickname: Spartans
- Newspaper: Oracle
- Yearbook: Summit
- Communities served: San Bernardino, Highland
- Website: School Website

San Gorgonio High School is a comprehensive senior high school in the San Bernardino City Unified School District. Its campus is located at the corner of Pacific Street and Arden Avenue on the border between San Bernardino and Highland, California.

== Athletics ==
San Gorgonio is a member of the San Andreas League in the CIF Southern Section.

== Alumni ==
- Laura Beeman, Women's basketball coach
- Robert Eatinger, CIA lawyer
- Kaleb Hayes (2017), NFL cornerback for the New York Giants
- Denean Howard, Olympic gold medalist
- Sherri Howard, Olympic gold medalist
- Steve Johnson (basketball), professional basketball player
- Dirk Kempthorne (1970), United States Secretary of the Interior from 2006 to 2009, 30th Governor of Idaho
- Bill Kernen (1966), College Baseball Head Coach, Cal State University Bakersfield
- Nate Meadors (2015), professional football player
- Stephanie Rehe, Women's Tennis Association player ranked No. 10 in 1989
- Kevin Stanfield (1974), professional baseball player
- Freddie Toliver, professional baseball player
