= Rialto, California =

City in California, United States

- City
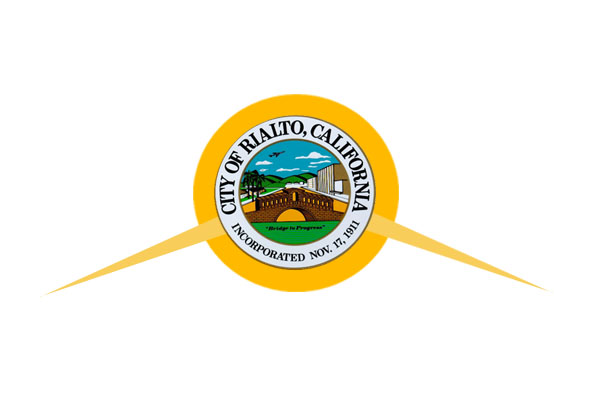
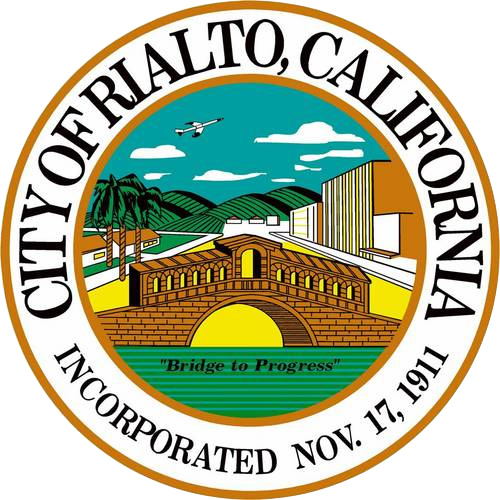
- Flag Seal
- Motto: Bridge to Progress
- Interactive map of Rialto, California
- Location in the United States
- Coordinates: 34°6′41″N 117°22′57″W
- Country: United States
- State: California
- County: San Bernardino
- Incorporated: November 17, 1911

Government
  - Mayor: Joe Baca
  - City clerk: Barbara A. McGee

Area
  - Total: 24.09 sq mi (62.39 km^{2})
  - Land: 24.09 sq mi (62.39 km^{2})
  - Water: 0 sq mi (0.00 km^{2}) 0.06%
- Elevation: 1,348 ft (411 m)

Population (2020)
  - Total: 104,026
  - Rank: 67th in California; 319th in the United States
  - Density: 4,318/sq mi (1,667/km^{2})
- Time zone: UTC−8 (Pacific Standard Time)
  - Summer (DST): UTC−7 (PDT)
- ZIP codes: 92376–92377
- Area code: 909
- FIPS code: 06-60466
- GNIS feature ID: 2410931
- Website: rialtoca.gov

Rialto is a city in the Inland Empire region of San Bernardino County, California, United States, 56 miles east of Los Angeles, near the Cajon Pass, Interstate 15, Interstate 10, State Route 210 and Metrolink routes.

Its population was 104,026 as of the 2020 census, up from 99,171 at the 2010 census. Its population and economic activity have grown rapidly in recent years due to the building of major distribution centers in the region.

Rialto is home to major regional distribution centers: Staples Inc., which serves stores across the entire West Coast of the United States, Amazon, Under Armour, Medline Industries, Niagara Bottling, Monster Energy and Target in the northern region of the city, in the Las Colinas community. One of the United States' largest fireworks companies, Pyro Spectaculars, is also headquartered in Rialto.

== History ==
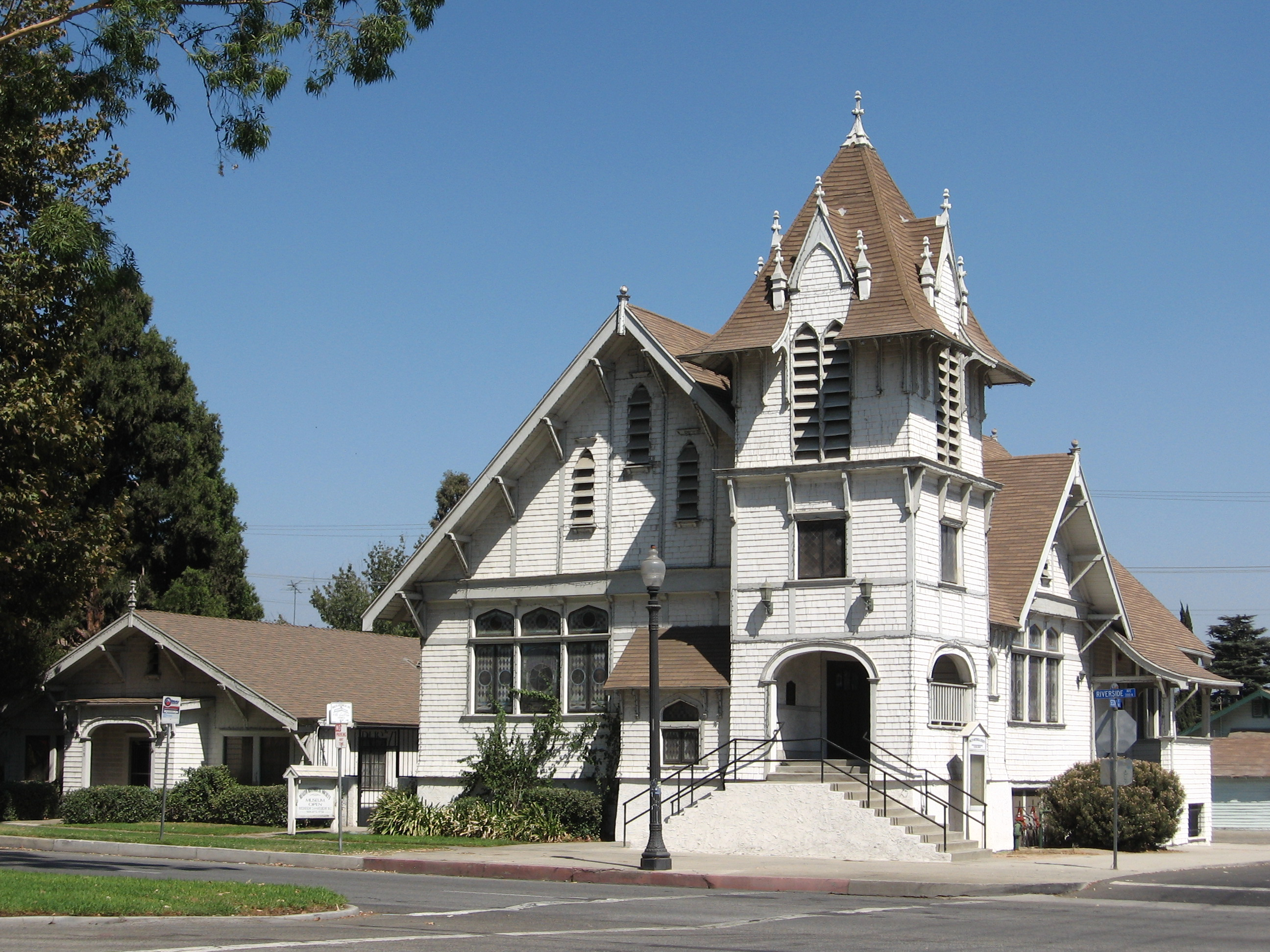
The 1907 First Christian Church, now the Rialto Historical Society

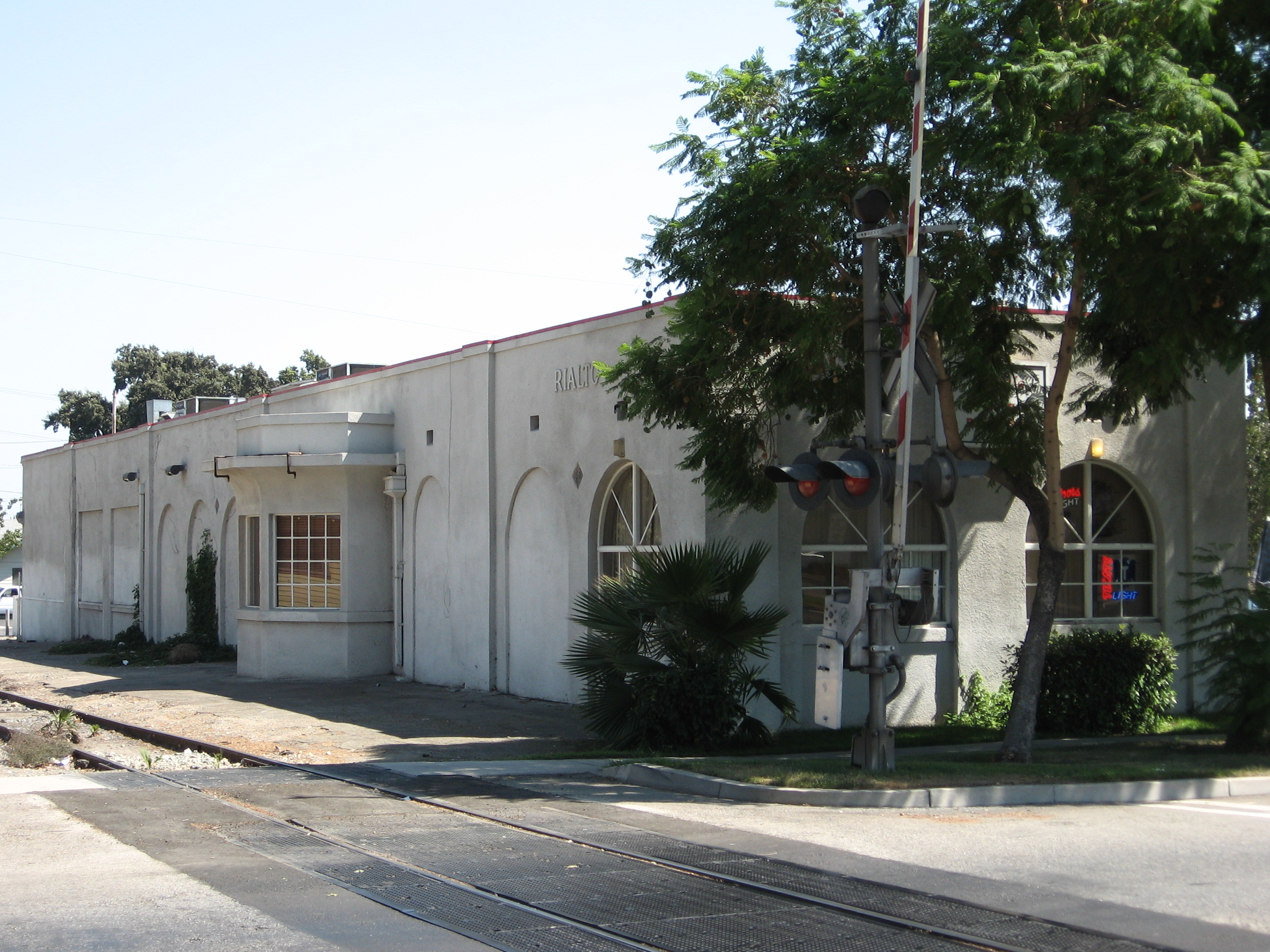
Pacific Electric depot, now a restaurant

Ancient artifacts discovered by archaeologists suggest that what is now the city of Rialto was settled prior to 1500. Such artifacts, now found at the Rialto Historical Society, indicate that the Serrano Indians lived in the Rialto area between 1500 and 1800 AD.

An adobe building from the early 19th century, which has been used for many purposes over the years, is the oldest building still standing in Rialto and stands restored near Bud Bender Park, formerly known as "Lilac Park" on Second Street and Riverside Avenue.

In 1842, the Lugo family was granted the Rancho San Bernardino—a holding of 37,700 acres—which encompassed Rialto. In 1851, the Mountain Family purchased part of the Lugo family's Rancho San Bernardino, and claimed several other portions of the ranch which later became known as Rialto. This claim was later amended by the United States Government, permitting them a smaller fraction of the initial purchase.

In 1887 a railroad connector line was built between San Bernardino and Pasadena by the Santa Fe Railroad. Along the line, townsites were located every 2,600 yards (2,400 m) [mile and a half] and by the fall of that year over 25 new towns were being built. This same year the Semitropic Land and Water Company was formed to organize the purchase and selling of real estate, water, and water rights and privileges. A Methodist colony developed which was named after the Rialto Bridge in Venice, Italy, considered a central meeting place for Venetians.

In the fall of 1888, the first school was built and Brooke School District was formed. Records show that up until 1920, the Brooke School District was in continuous operation, except for a very short time in 1888. The prominent Rialto Trapp family bought the first school house in 1921, remodeled the building, and members of the family resided in it until it was destroyed by fire. The Rialto School District (today Rialto Unified School District), was formed in 1891. The staff consisted of two teachers and a principal with separate play areas for the boys and girls.

In 1901 a cemetery was established in the township. It is administered by the City Treasurer.

The Chamber of Commerce was established in 1907. The Chamber incorporated in the spring of 1911. By 1911 the population had grown to 1,500 with 40 businesses and a local newspaper. The election results on October 31 of the same year were 135 votes for the incorporation of the city and 72 against.

Foothill Boulevard was repaired in 1913 and became U.S. Route 66, a section of the U.S. highway system. In 1914 Los Angeles' Pacific Electric Railway completed its San Bernardino Line through the City of Rialto, with a junction at Riverside Avenue for the Riverside Line. Today the Tracks above First Street are a part of the Union Pacific and the Pacific Electric depot on Riverside Avenue is Cuca's Restaurant.

A fire in the 1920s swept through and destroyed many of the buildings in the downtown area.

The U.S. Army Rialto Ammunition Storage point which was used during World War II to support operations in the Pacific theater. The 160-acre site (65 ha) was operated between 1941-1945 and the land later sold to defense contractors and private corporations. The site is a Superfund Site that was scheduled to begin remediation in 2020.

In the late 1990s, the city's drinking water was contaminated by perchlorate leaking from a 160-acre (65 ha) site owned by a defense contractors and fireworks manufacturer that handles perchlorate salts and hazardous materials. The city launched lawsuits against 42 parties. The United States Environmental Protection Agency designed a groundwater pump and treatment system to remove and clean contaminated water, and negotiated settlements to several lawsuits. Cleanup costs reached $100 million in 2014, and a pumping station was estimated to begin treating contaminated water between 2020 and 2021.

== Geography ==
According to the United States Census Bureau, the city has a total area of 24.1 square miles (62 km^{2}), all land.

Rialto lies under the Rialto-Colton fault line and greater San Jacinto fault zone.

=== Climate ===
Rialto experiences a Mediterranean climate with hot, dry summers and relatively mild winters. Similar to other neighboring cities, Rialto is affected by the Santa Ana winds, with residents experiencing the warm and dry air through the Cajon Pass. Summers are noted to be hot, with frequent stretches over 90°F, sometimes reaching above 100 °F.

Climate data for Rialto, California, 1992-2021 normals
Month	Jan	Feb	Mar	Apr	May	Jun	Jul	Aug	Sep	Oct	Nov	Dec	Year
Mean daily maximum °F (°C)	66 (19)	66 (19)	70 (21)	75 (24)	79 (26)	87 (31)	94 (34)	95 (35)	91 (33)	81 (27)	73 (23)	65 (18)	79 (26)
Daily mean °F (°C)	53 (12)	53 (12)	56 (13)	60 (16)	66 (19)	72 (22)	78 (26)	79 (26)	75 (24)	67 (19)	58 (14)	52 (11)	64 (18)
Mean daily minimum °F (°C)	40 (4)	41 (5)	43 (6)	46 (8)	52 (11)	57 (14)	62 (17)	63 (17)	60 (16)	52 (11)	43 (6)	38 (3)	50 (10)
Average precipitation inches (mm)	1.77 (45)	2.16 (55)	1.13 (29)	0.62 (16)	0.26 (6.6)	0.09 (2.3)	0.11 (2.8)	0.06 (1.5)	0.11 (2.8)	0.43 (11)	.56 (14)	1.42 (36)	8.72 (222)
Source: timeanddate

== Demographics ==
Historical population
Census	Pop.	Note	%±
1920	961		—
1930	1,642		70.9%
1940	1,770		7.8%
1950	3,156		78.3%
1960	18,567		488.3%
1970	28,370		52.8%
1980	37,862		33.5%
1990	72,388		91.2%
2000	91,873		26.9%
2010	99,171		7.9%
2020	104,026		4.9%
U.S. Decennial Census

=== Racial and ethnic composition ===
Rialto city, California – Racial and ethnic composition Note: the US Census treats Hispanic/Latino as an ethnic category. This table excludes Latinos from the racial categories and assigns them to a separate category. Hispanics/Latinos may be of any race.
Race / Ethnicity (NH = Non-Hispanic)	Pop 2000	Pop 2010	Pop 2020	% 2000	% 2010	% 2020
White alone (NH)	19,713	12,475	9,568	21.46%	12.58%	9.20%
Black or African American alone (NH)	19,954	15,457	11,722	21.72%	15.59%	11.27%
Native American or Alaska Native alone (NH)	370	237	298	0.40%	0.24%	0.29%
Asian alone (NH)	2,162	2,037	2,457	2.35%	2.05%	2.36%
Native Hawaiian or Pacific Islander alone (NH)	341	313	320	0.37%	0.32%	0.31%
Other Race alone (NH)	194	186	490	0.21%	0.19%	0.47%
Mixed race or Multiracial (NH)	2,089	1,428	1,826	2.27%	1.44%	1.76%
Hispanic or Latino (any race)	47,050	67,038	77,345	51.21%	67.60%	74.35%
Total	91,873	99,171	104,026	100.00%	100.00%	100.00%

=== 2020 ===
The 2020 United States census reported that Rialto had a population of 104,026. The population density was 4,318.2 inhabitants per square mile (1,667.3/km^{2}). The racial makeup of Rialto was 21.0% White, 11.9% African American, 2.6% Native American, 2.6% Asian, 0.4% Pacific Islander, 43.1% from other races, and 18.4% from two or more races. Hispanic or Latino of any race were 74.4% of the population.

The census reported that 99.5% of the population lived in households, 0.3% lived in non-institutionalized group quarters, and 0.2% were institutionalized.

There were 27,307 households, out of which 49.9% included children under the age of 18, 52.3% were married-couple households, 7.4% were cohabiting couple households, 25.8% had a female householder with no partner present, and 14.5% had a male householder with no partner present. 12.3% of households were one person, and 5.9% were one person aged 65 or older. The average household size was 3.79. There were 22,867 families (83.7% of all households).

The age distribution was 27.5% under the age of 18, 11.1% aged 18 to 24, 27.8% aged 25 to 44, 22.9% aged 45 to 64, and 10.7% who were 65 years of age or older. The median age was 32.2 years. For every 100 females, there were 95.1 males.

There were 27,954 housing units at an average density of 1,160.4 units per square mile (448.0 units/km^{2}), of which 27,307 (97.7%) were occupied. Of these, 63.8% were owner-occupied, and 36.2% were occupied by renters.

In 2023, the US Census Bureau estimated that the median household income was $85,521, and the per capita income was $26,943. About 11.0% of families and 12.6% of the population were below the poverty line.

=== 2010 ===
The 2010 United States census reported that Rialto had a population of 99,171. The population density was 4,434.1 inhabitants per square mile (1,712.0/km^{2}). The racial makeup of Rialto was 43,592 (44.0%) White (12.6% Non-Hispanic White), 16,236 (16.4%) African American, 1,062 (1.1%) Native American, 2,258 (2.3%) Asian, 361 (0.4%) Pacific Islander, 30,993 (31.3%) from other races, and 4,669 (4.7%) from two or more races. Hispanic or Latino of any race were 67,038 persons (67.6%).

The Census reported that 98,724 people (99.5% of the population) lived in households, 254 (0.3%) lived in non-institutionalized group quarters, and 193 (0.2%) were institutionalized.

There were 25,202 households, out of which 14,384 (57.1%) had children under the age of 18 living in them, 13,811 (54.8%) were opposite-sex married couples living together, 5,175 (20.5%) had a female householder with no husband present, 2,191 (8.7%) had a male householder with no wife present. There were 1,780 (7.1%) unmarried opposite-sex partnerships, and 150 (0.6%) same-sex married couples or partnerships. 3,141 households (12.5%) were made up of individuals, and 1,283 (5.1%) had someone living alone who was 65 years of age or older. The average household size was 3.92. There were 21,177 families (84.0% of all households); the average family size was 4.20.

The population was spread out, with 32,604 people (32.9%) under the age of 18, 12,204 people (12.3%) aged 18 to 24, 26,802 people (27.0%) aged 25 to 44, 20,655 people (20.8%) aged 45 to 64, and 6,906 people (7.0%) who were 65 years of age or older. The median age was 28.3 years. For every 100 females, there were 94.7 males. For every 100 females age 18 and over, there were 92.1 males.

There were 27,203 housing units at an average density of 1,216.3 units per square mile (469.6 units/km^{2}), of which 16,294 (64.7%) were owner-occupied, and 8,908 (35.3%) were occupied by renters. The homeowner vacancy rate was 3.1%; the rental vacancy rate was 9.7%. 64,148 people (64.7% of the population) lived in owner-occupied housing units and 34,576 people (34.9%) lived in rental housing units.

According to the 2010 U.S. Census, Rialto had a median household income of $49,428, with 19.2% of the population living below the federal poverty line.

=== Crime ===
Rialto's crime rate was slightly above the national average every year from 1999 to 2007. From 2008 to 2016, the crime rate in Rialto was below the national average. In 2006, Rialto fielded 0.89 police officers per 1,000 residents, less than one-third the national average. Rialto was the first city in the United States to require that all police officers wear body cameras.

== Government ==
=== State and federal representation ===
In the California State Legislature, Rialto is in the 29th senatorial district, represented by Democrat Eloise Reyes, and is split between the 45th Assembly district, represented by Democrat James Ramos and the 50th Assembly district, represented by Democrat Robert Garcia.

In the United States House of Representatives, Rialto is split between California's 33rd congressional district, represented by Democrat Pete Aguilar.

=== City ===
Joe Baca was elected Mayor of Rialto in 2024. The City Manager is Tanya Williams.

=== 2005 recall election ===
On September 13, 2005, the Rialto city council voted to dissolve the Rialto Police Department and replace it with a contract with the San Bernardino County sheriff's department. Soon after the vote, a San Bernardino County court issued an injunction on the change because the vote was done in secret. As a result, two city council members, Ed Scott and Winfred Lee Hansen, were up for recall. In March 2006, city leaders decided to keep the police department.

== Education ==
The majority of Rialto is in the Rialto Unified School District. Some portions are in Fontana Unified School District (the western portion), Colton Joint Unified School District (southern portion), and San Bernardino City Unified School District (a few parcels in the north).

Rialto is also served by the San Bernardino Community College District. San Bernardino Valley College is the closest SBCCD campus to the city.

== Media ==
Rialto Network is a public, educational, and government access (PEG) cable television station based in Rialto. The station was created in 1991 as KRTO (KRialTO) and in 2012 the station was renamed Rialto Network. Rialto Network is located in the Civic Center and the station is cablecast daily on Spectrum Cable cable system on Channels 3, and on AT&T U-verse PEG cable TV channel 99. It is also webcast.

== Infrastructure ==
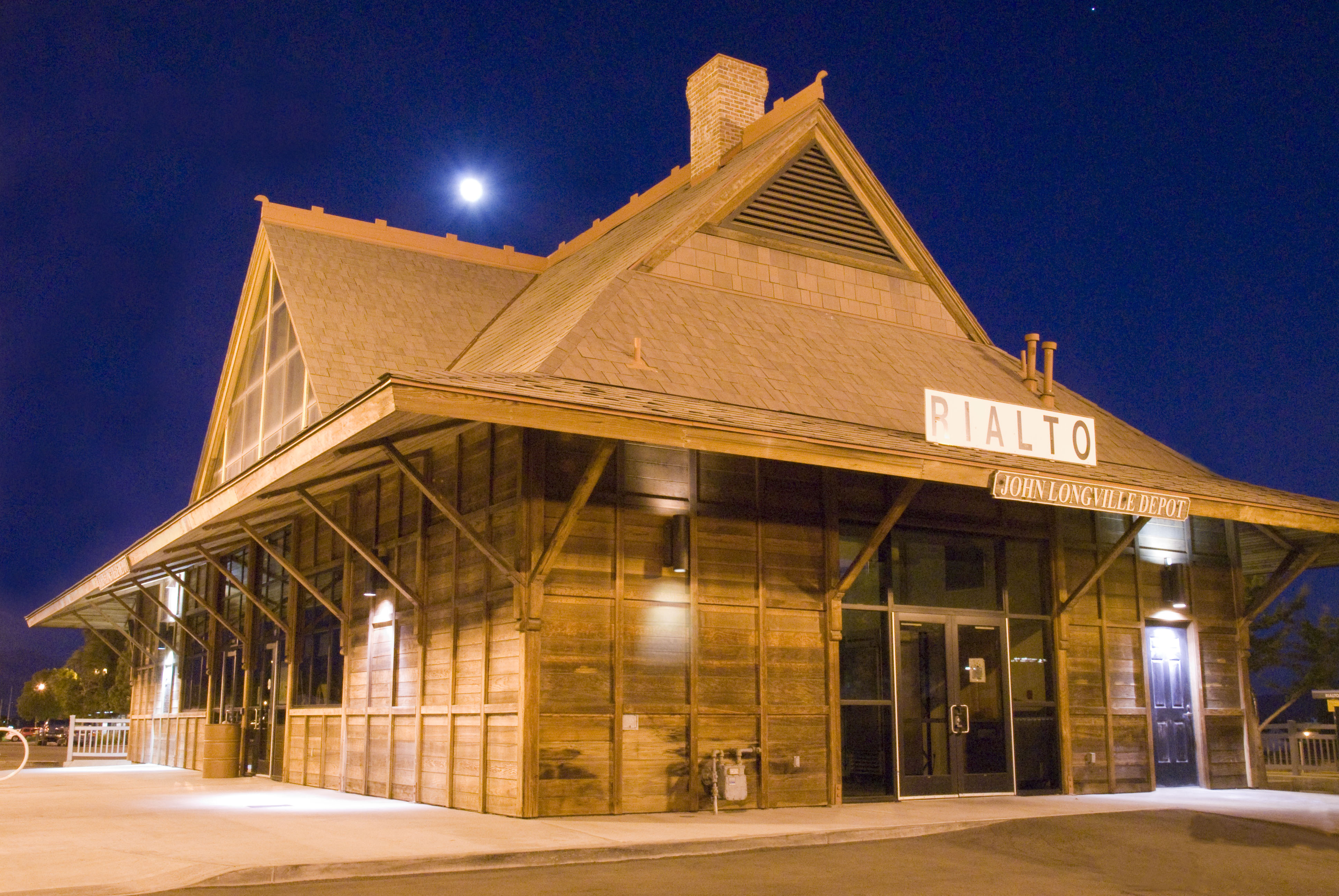
Rialto station

=== Transportation ===
The City of Rialto is situated between Interstate 10 and State Route 210. According to statistics approximately 55% of the working class in the city of Rialto commute more than 10 miles (16 km) to get to work and almost 13% travel to and from Los Angeles and San Bernardino. Average commute times from Rialto are between 33.6 and 37.6 minutes.

Rialto is served by the Metrolink commuter rail system on the San Bernardino Line at Rialto station. The San Bernardino Line takes approximately one hour and twenty minutes to commute each way to Los Angeles and ten minutes to San Bernardino. The same trip by car via the 10 or 210 freeways takes between 45 minutes and 2 hours, depending on traffic.

== Notable people ==
- Alex Acker, professional basketball player (second round pick)
- Nick Barnett, professional football player for the Green Bay Packers
- Victor Butler, professional football player for the New Orleans Saints
- Ted Chronopoulos, retired soccer player
- Ryan Clady, professional football player for the Denver Broncos
- Kenny Clark, professional football player for the Dallas Cowboys
- Jeff Conine, retired professional baseball player for the Florida Marlins
- George Connor (1906–2001), race car driver
- Wilson Cruz, actor (My So Called Life, Party of Five)
- Kirk Fogg, actor, game show host and singer, 1977 graduate of Eisenhower High School.
- Clarence Gilyard Jr., actor (Matlock and Walker, Texas Ranger)
- Marvelle Harris, professional basketball player for the Illawarra Hawks
- J. J. Fad, hip hop group
- Rodney King, African-American taxi driver whose videotaped beating by police in 1991 was the catalyst for the 1992 Los Angeles Riots
- Mélange Lavonne, singer
- John Longville, former Rialto Mayor after whom the Metrolink station is named
- Ronnie Lott, Hall of Fame football player, primarily for the San Francisco 49ers, 1981–94
- Nanci Meek Kusley Professional Actress (Down Home, License to Drive, Matlock)
- Ricky Nolasco, professional baseball player for the Los Angeles Angels
- David Ray, poet
- Jorge Ruvalcaba, footballer
- John Singleton, film director, screenwriter, producer
- Twyla Tharp, choreographer and dancer, raised in Rialto
- Randy Thomas, songwriter and guitarist for Sweet Comfort Band, co-founder of Allies
- Lisa Marie Varon, professional wrestler
- Josh Whitesell, professional baseball player for the Arizona Diamondbacks
- Jamaal Williams, professional football player for the Detroit Lions
