= Eisenhower High School (Rialto, California) =

High school in California, United States

Location
- 1321 N Lilac Ave. Rialto, California 92376; United States; 34.1217559°N 117.3773121°W

Information
- School type: Secondary
- Established: 1959
- School board: Rialto Unified School District
- Superintendent: Cuauhtémoc Avila
- Principal: Kristal Henríquez Pulido
- Teaching staff: 95.30 (FTE)
- Grades: 9-12
- Enrollment: 2,152 (2023–2024)
- Student to teacher ratio: 22.58
- Colors: Kelly green and gold
- Nickname: Eagles
- Website: eisenhower.rialto.k12.ca.us

Dwight D. Eisenhower High School (est. 1959), is located in Rialto, California, United States on the corner of Baseline Avenue and Lilac Ave. The school is named for U.S. President Dwight D. Eisenhower.

Eisenhower High School is located in Rialto, California, which lies north of Interstate 10, between the cities of San Bernardino and Fontana. It is one of three comprehensive high schools in the Rialto Unified School District and serves a student population of approximately 2,400 in grades 9–12. Established in 1959.

Dwight D. Eisenhower High School has been awarded National Blue Ribbon School 1993 and California Distinguished School 1994.

In 2019 the school enacted the "Breakfast in the Classroom" program to ensure that all students are fed before they start their classes; this was done after the district examined the program at a high school in Los Angeles.

== Notable alumni ==
- Alex Acker, NBA player for the Clippers
- Wally Adeyemo, United States Deputy Secretary of the Treasury in the Biden administration (2021—)
- Brandie Burton, LPGA golfer
- Victor Butler, 2005, member of the Dallas Cowboys, played college at the Oregon State University
- Ted Chronopoulos, Major League Soccer player
- Ryan Clady, 2004, football player, Denver Broncos, 1st round draft choice in the 2008 NFL draft.
- Darnell Coles, Seattle Mariners and Detroit Tigers
- Jeff Conine, retired MLB player
- Marvelle Harris, basketball player
- Bob Rauch, former MLB pitcher for New York Mets
- Kirk Fogg, 1977, actor and game show host
- Clarence Gilyard, actor (Matlock and Walker, Texas Ranger)
- David Lang, 1986, drafted in the 12th round of the 1990 NFL Draft to the Northern Arizona University, Los Angeles Rams, special teams captain of the Super Bowl XXX-winning Dallas Cowboys
- Sataoa Laumea, college football offensive lineman for the Utah Utes
- Ronnie Lott, NFL Hall of Fame
- Craig Newsome, 1995 Green Bay Packers 1st Round Draft Pick, Super Bowl XXXI Champion
- Sean Marshall, pro basketball player
- Dave Rucker, former MLB pitcher
- John Singleton, film director, screenwriter, producer
- R. Jay Soward, 1992–1995 student, former National Football League and USC Trojans football
- Lisa Marie Varon, professional wrestler
