= Valley High School =

Valley High School may refer to:

== United States ==
=== Alabama ===
- Pleasant Valley High School (Alabama), Jacksonville, Alabama
- Valley High School (Alabama), Valley, Alabama

=== Alaska ===
- West Valley High School (Alaska), Fairbanks, Alaska
- Tri-Valley School, Healy, Alaska

=== Arizona ===
- Valley Christian High School (Arizona), Chandler, Arizona
- Chino Valley High School, Chino Valley, Arizona
- Valley Union High School, Elfrida, Arizona
- Santa Cruz Valley Union High School, Eloy, Arizona
- Deer Valley High School (Arizona), Glendale, Arizona
- Sun Valley High School (Arizona), Mesa, Arizona
- River Valley High School (Arizona), Mohave Valley, Arizona
- Valley Lutheran High School (Phoenix, Arizona), Phoenix, Arizona
- Valley High School (Apache County, Arizona), Sanders, Arizona
- Valley Vista High School (Arizona), Surprise, Arizona

=== Arkansas ===
- Valley View High School (Arkansas), Jonesboro, Arkansas
- Fourche Valley School, Yell County, Arkansas
- Valley Springs High School, Valley Springs, Arkansas

=== California ===
- Deer Valley High School (California), Antioch, California
- Apple Valley High School (California), Apple Valley, California
- Valley High School (Atwater, California), Atwater, California
- Central Valley High School (Bakersfield, California), Bakersfield, California
- Golden Valley High School (Bakersfield, California), Bakersfield, California
- Bear Valley High School, Bear Valley, Alpine County, California
- Big Valley High School, Bieber, California
- Palo Verde Valley High School, Blythe, California
- Anderson Valley Junior-Senior High School, Boonville, California
- Castro Valley High School, Castro Valley, California
- Surprise Valley High School, Cedarville, California
- Central Valley High School (Ceres, California), Ceres, California
- Valley Christian High School (Cerritos, California), Cerritos, California
- Pleasant Valley High School (California), Chico, California
- Valley Oak Academy, Citrus Heights, California
- Clayton Valley Charter High School, Concord, California
- Ygnacio Valley High School, Concord, California
- West Valley High School (Cottonwood, California), Cottonwood, California
- Round Valley High School, Covelo, California
- San Ramon Valley High School, Danville, California
- Valley High School (Dublin, California), Dublin, California
- Valley Christian School, Dublin, California
- Diego Valley Charter High School, El Cajon, California
- El Cajon Valley High School, El Cajon, California
- Diego Valley Charter High School, Escondido, California
- Valley High School (Escondido, California)
- Fountain Valley High School, Fountain Valley, California
- Valley Vista High School (California), Fountain Valley, California
- Crescent Valley Public Charter, Hanford, California
- West Valley High School (Hemet, California), Hemet, California
- Hoopa Valley High School, Hoopa, California
- Owens Valley High School, Independence, California
- Jurupa Valley High School, Jurupa Valley, California
- Kern Valley High School, Lake Isabella, California
- Antelope Valley High School, Lancaster, California
- Leggett Valley High School, Leggett, California
- Sun Valley High School (California), Sun Valley, Los Angeles, California
- East Valley High School (California), North Hollywood, Los Angeles, California
- Panorama High School, formerly known as East Valley Area New High School #3, Panorama City, Los Angeles, California
- Valley High School (Sepulveda, California), Sepulveda, Los Angeles, California
- West Valley Christian School, West Hills, Los Angeles, California
- Valley High School (Los Banos, California), Los Banos, California
- Valley Oak Academy, Mariposa, California
- Paloma Valley High School, Menifee, California
- Golden Valley High School (Merced, California)
- Valley High School (Merced, California), Merced, California
- Capistrano Valley High School, Mission Viejo, California
- Moreno Valley High School (California), Moreno Valley, California
- Valley View High School (Moreno Valley, California)
- Murrieta Valley High School, Murrieta, California
- Valley Oak High School, Napa, California
- Diego Valley Charter High School, Oceanside, California
- Valley View High School (Ontario, California), Ontario, California
- Pinole Valley High School, Pinole, California
- Amador Valley High School, Pleasanton, California
- Potter Valley High School, Potter Valley, California
- Mountain Valley Academy High School, Ramona, California
- Palm Valley School, Rancho Mirage, California
- Citrus Valley High School Redlands, California
- Redlands East Valley High School Redlands, California
- Golden Valley Charter School, Sacramento, California
- River Valley School, Sacramento, Sacramento, California
- Sacramento Valley School, Sacramento, California
- Upper Valley High School, East Sacramento, Sacramento, California
- Valley High School (Sacramento, California)
- Arroyo Valley High School, San Bernardino, California
- Evergreen Valley High School, San Jose, California
- Valley Christian High School (San Jose, California)
- Capistrano Valley Christian Schools, San Juan Capistrano, California
- Saddleback Valley Christian School, San Juan Capistrano, California
- Dougherty Valley High School, San Ramon, California
- Valley High School (Santa Ana, California)
- Golden Valley High School (Santa Clarita, California)
- Scotts Valley High School Scotts Valley, California
- Central Valley High School (Shasta Lake, California)
- Death Valley Academy, Shoshone, California
- Simi Valley High School, Simi Valley, California
- Sonoma Valley High School, Sonoma, California
- Squaw Valley Academy, Squaw Valley, Placer County, California
- Temecula Valley High School, Temecula, California
- Coachella Valley High School, Thermal, California
- Yokayo Valley Charter High School, Ukiah, California
- Victor Valley High School, Victorville, California
- Central Valley Christian High School, Visalia, California
- San Pasqual Valley High School, Winterhaven, California
- Silver Valley High School, Yermo, California
- River Valley High School (California), Yuba City, California
- Yucca Valley High School, Yucca Valley, California

=== Colorado ===
- Ralston Valley High School, Arvada, Colorado
- Valley High School (Colorado), Gilcrest, Colorado

=== Connecticut ===
- Shepaug Valley School, Washington, Connecticut
- Valley Regional High School, Deep River, Connecticut

=== Idaho ===
- Tri-Valley High School (Idaho), Cambridge, Idaho
- Garden Valley High School, Garden Valley, Idaho
- Valley High School (Idaho), Hazelton, Idaho
- Meadows Valley Junior/Senior High School, New Meadows, Idaho

=== Illinois ===
- Metea Valley High School, Aurora, Illinois
- Waubonsie Valley High School, Aurora, Illinois
- Tri-Valley High School (Illinois), Downs, Illinois
- Neuqua Valley High School, Naperville, Illinois

=== Indiana ===
- Springs Valley High School, French Lick, Indiana
- Blue River Valley Junior-Senior High School, New Castle, Indiana
- Kankakee Valley High School, Wheatfield Township, Indiana

=== Iowa ===
- Valley Lutheran High School (Iowa), Cedar Falls, Iowa
- Southwest Valley High School, Corning, Iowa
- Valley High School (Elgin, Iowa), Elgin, Iowa
- Maple Valley-Anthon Oto High School, Mapleton, Iowa
- Fox Valley Jr./Sr. High School, in Fox Valley Community School District, Milton, Iowa
- Missouri Valley High School, Missouri Valley, Iowa
- Pleasant Valley High School (Iowa), Riverdale, Iowa
- Valley High School (West Des Moines, Iowa), West Des Moines, Iowa

=== Kansas ===
- Royal Valley High School, Hoyt, Kansas
- Blue Valley High School, Overland Park, Kansas
- Blue Valley North High School, Overland Park, Kansas
- Blue Valley Northwest High School, Overland Park, Kansas
- Blue Valley Southwest High School, Overland Park, Kansas
- Blue Valley West High School, Overland Park, Kansas
- Mission Valley High School, Wabaunsee County, Kansas

=== Kentucky ===
- Valley Traditional High School, Valley Station, Kentucky

=== Maine ===
- Sacopee Valley High School, Hiram, Maine
- Mountain Valley High School, Rumford, Maine

=== Maryland ===
- Seneca Valley High School, Germantown, Maryland

=== Massachusetts ===
- Hoosac Valley High School, Cheshire, Massachusetts
- Assabet Valley Regional Technical High School, Marlborough, Massachusetts

=== Michigan ===
- Chippewa Valley High School, Macomb County, Michigan
- Chippewa Valley Schools, Macomb County, Michigan
- Swan Valley High School, Saginaw, Michigan
- Valley Lutheran High School (Michigan), Saginaw, Michigan
- River Valley High School (Michigan), Three Oaks, Michigan
- Maple Valley High School (Michigan), Vermontville, Michigan

=== Minnesota ===
- Apple Valley High School (Minnesota), Apple Valley, Minnesota

=== Missouri ===
- Valley High School (Caledonia, Missouri), Caledonia, Missouri
- Valley Park High School, Valley Park, Missouri

=== Montana ===
- Valley Christian School (Montana), Missoula, Montana

=== Nebraska ===
- Valley High School (Nebraska), Valley, Nebraska

=== Nevada ===
- Green Valley High School, Henderson, Nevada
- Virgin Valley High School, Mesquite, Nevada
- Valley High School (Winchester, Nevada)

=== New Jersey ===
- Northern Valley Regional High School at Demarest, Bergen County, New Jersey
- Northern Valley Regional High School at Old Tappan, Bergen County, New Jersey
- Pascack Valley High School, Bergen County, New Jersey
- Rancocas Valley Regional High School, Burlington County, New Jersey
- Delaware Valley Torah Institute, Cherry Hill, New Jersey
- Hopewell Valley Central High School, Hopewell Valley, New Jersey
- Delaware Valley Regional High School, Hunterdon County, New Jersey
- Lenape Valley Regional High School, Morris County, New Jersey
- Passaic Valley Regional High School, Passaic County, New Jersey
- Wayne Valley High School, Passaic County, New Jersey
- Wallkill Valley Regional High School Sussex County, New Jersey

=== New Hampshire ===
- ConVal Regional High School (short for Contoocook Valley Regional High School), Peterborough, New Hampshire

=== New Mexico ===
- Valley High School (New Mexico), Albuquerque, New Mexico
- Moreno Valley Preparatory, Angel Fire, New Mexico
- Española Valley High School, Española, New Mexico

=== New York ===
- Rondout Valley High School, Accord, New York
- Tech Valley High School, at SUNY Polytechnic Institute, Albany, New York
- Tri-Valley Central School, Grahamsville, New York
- Valley Stream Central High School, Valley Stream, New York
- Valley Stream South High School, South Valley Stream, New York

=== North Carolina ===
- Sun Valley High School (North Carolina), Monroe, North Carolina

=== North Dakota ===
- Central Valley High School (North Dakota), Buxton, North Dakota
- Valley High School (North Dakota), Hoople, North Dakota
- Maple Valley High School (North Dakota), Tower City, North Dakota
- Valley City High School, Valley City, North Dakota

=== Ohio ===
- Teays Valley High School, Ashville, Ohio
- Paint Valley High School, Bainbridge, Ross County, Ohio
- River Valley High School (Bidwell, Ohio), Gallia County, Ohio
- Tri-Valley High School (Ohio), Dresden, Ohio
- Indian Valley High School (Ohio), Gnadenhutten, Ohio
- Symmes Valley High School, Lawrence County, Ohio
- Valley High School (Ohio), Lucasville, Ohio
- Sandy Valley High School, Magnolia, Ohio
- Conotton Valley High School, Orange Township, Carroll County, Ohio
- Grand Valley High School, Orwell, Ohio
- Valley Forge High School, Parma Heights, Ohio
- Buckeye Valley High School, Troy Township, Delaware County, Ohio
- Mississinawa Valley High School, Union City, Ohio
- Tuscarawas Valley High School, Zoarville, Ohio

=== Oregon ===
- Valley Catholic School, Beaverton, Oregon
- Willamette Valley Christian School, Brooks, Oregon
- Camas Valley Charter School, Camas Valley, Oregon
- Crescent Valley High School, Corvallis, Oregon
- Hidden Valley High School (Oregon), Grants Pass, Oregon
- North Valley High School, Grants Pass, Oregon
- Jordan Valley High School, Jordan Valley, Oregon
- Powder Valley School, North Powder, Oregon
- Siletz Valley Early College Academy, Siletz, Oregon

=== Pennsylvania ===
- Juniata Valley Junior/Senior High School, Alexandria, Pennsylvania
- Steel Valley Senior High School, see Steel Valley School District#Senior High School, Allegheny County, Pennsylvania
- Valley View High School (Pennsylvania), Archbald, Pennsylvania
- Sun Valley High School (Pennsylvania), Aston, Pennsylvania
- Chartiers Valley High School, Bridgeville, Pennsylvania
- Pleasant Valley High School (Pennsylvania), Brodheadsville, Pennsylvania
- Great Valley High School, Chester County, Pennsylvania
- Perkiomen Valley High School, Collegeville, Pennsylvania
- Valley Forge Baptist Academy, Collegeville, Pennsylvania
- Turkeyfoot Valley Area Junior/Senior High School, Confluence, Pennsylvania
- Conneaut Valley High School, Conneautville, Pennsylvania
- Twin Valley High School (Pennsylvania), see Berks County, Pennsylvania#Education, Elverson, Pennsylvania
- Allegheny-Clarion Valley Junior/Senior High School, Foxburg, Pennsylvania
- Garnet Valley High School, Glen Mills, Pennsylvania
- Seneca Valley High School (Pennsylvania), Harmony, Pennsylvania
- Tri-Valley Junior/Senior High School, Hegins, Pennsylvania
- Saucon Valley High School, Hellertown, Pennsylvania
- Moshannon Valley Junior/Senior High School, Houtzdale, Pennsylvania
- Conemaugh Valley Junior/Senior High School, Johnstown, Pennsylvania
- Pequea Valley High School, Kinzers, Pennsylvania
- Conestoga Valley High School, Lancaster, Pennsylvania
- Panther Valley High School, Lansford, Pennsylvania
- Schuylkill Valley High School, Leesport, Pennsylvania
- Quaker Valley High School, Leetsdale, Pennsylvania
- Ligonier Valley High School, Ligonier, Pennsylvania
- Saucon Valley High School, Lower Saucon Township, Pennsylvania
- Great Valley High School, Malvern, Pennsylvania
- Cumberland Valley High School, Mechanicsburg, Pennsylvania
- Delaware Valley High School, Milford, Pennsylvania
- Central Valley High School (Pennsylvania), Monaca, Pennsylvania
- Steel Valley High School, see Steel Valley School District, Munhall, Pennsylvania
- Blacklick Valley Junior-Senior High School, Nanty Glo, Pennsylvania
- Redbank Valley Junior/Senior High School, New Bethlehem, Pennsylvania
- Laurel Valley Middle/High School, New Florence, Pennsylvania
- Valley High School (New Kensington, Pennsylvania) also known as Valley Junior/Senior High School, New Kensington, Pennsylvania
- Oley Valley High School, Oley Valley, Pennsylvania
- Delaware Valley Friends School, Paoli, Pennsylvania
- Perkiomen Valley High School, see Perkiomen Valley School District, Perkiomen Township, Montgomery County, Pennsylvania
- Delaware Valley Charter High School, Philadelphia, Pennsylvania
- Wyoming Valley West Senior High School, Plymouth, Luzerne County, Pennsylvania
- Shenandoah Valley Junior/Senior High School, Shenandoah, Pennsylvania
- Oswayo Valley Junior/Senior High School, Shinglehouse, Pennsylvania
- Penns Valley Area Junior/Senior High School, Spring Mills, Pennsylvania
- Mid Valley Secondary Center, Throop, Pennsylvania
- Williams Valley Junior/Senior High School, Tower City, Pennsylvania
- Valley Forge Military Academy and College, Wayne, Pennsylvania
- Cowanesque Valley Junior Senior High School, Westfield, Pennsylvania
- Wyalusing Valley Junior/Senior High School, Wyalusing, Pennsylvania

=== South Carolina ===
- Spring Valley High School (South Carolina), Columbia, South Carolina

=== South Dakota ===
- Brandon Valley High School, Brandon, South Dakota
- Tri-Valley High School (South Dakota), Colton, South Dakota
- Sioux Valley High School, Volga, South Dakota

=== Texas ===
- Smithson Valley High School, Comal County, Texas
- Valley High School (Harlingen, Texas), Harlingen, Texas
- Valley High School (Turkey, Texas), Turkey, Texas

=== Utah ===
- Valley High School (Orderville, Utah), Orderville, Utah
- Valley High School (South Jordan, Utah), South Jordan, Utah

=== Virginia ===
- Loudoun Valley High School, Purcellville, Virginia
- Hidden Valley High School (Virginia), Roanoke County, Virginia

=== Washington ===
- Maple Valley High School (Washington), Maple Valley, Washington
- West Valley High School (Spokane, Washington)
- Central Valley High School (Washington), Spokane Valley, Washington
- West Valley High School (Yakima, Washington)

=== West Virginia ===
- Valley High School (Pine Grove, West Virginia)
- Valley High School (Smithers, West Virginia)
- Spring Valley High School (West Virginia), Wayne County, West Virginia

== Elsewhere ==
- Kennebecasis Valley High School, Quispamsis, New Brunswick, Canada
- Madawaska Valley District High School, Barry's Bay, Ontario, Canada
- Valley Heights Secondary School, Walsingham, Ontario, Canada
- Roding Valley High School, Loughton, Essex, England
- Alde Valley Academy, Leiston, Suffolk, England
- Don Valley Academy, Scawthorpe, Doncaster, South Yorkshire, England
- Honley High School, Holme Valley, West Yorkshire, England
- Colne Valley High School, Linthwaite, Huddersfield, West Yorkshire, England
- Philippine Science High School Cagayan Valley Campus, Brgy. Masoc, Bayombong, Nueva Vizcaya, Philippines
- River Valley High School

== See also ==
- Central Valley High School (disambiguation)
- East Valley High School (disambiguation)
- Hidden Valley High School (disambiguation)
- River Valley High School (disambiguation)
- Valley Christian High School (disambiguation)
- Valley Lutheran High School (disambiguation)
- Valley View High School (disambiguation)
- Valley Vista High School (disambiguation)
- West Valley High School (disambiguation)
