= VVHS =

VVHS may refer to:

- Valley View High School (disambiguation)
- Valley Vista High School (Fountain Valley, California), United States
- Valley Vista High School (Surprise, Arizona), United States
- Vasant Vihar High School, Thane, Maharashtra, India
- Victor Valley High School, Victorville, California, United States
- Volcano Vista High School, Albuquerque, New Mexico, United States
