= EVHS =

EVHS may refer to:

- Eagle Valley High School, in Gypsum, Colorado
- East Valley High School (disambiguation)
- East View High School (Georgetown, Texas)
- Eastern View High School, in Culpeper, Virginia
- Eastview High School in Apple Valley, Minnesota
- Española Valley High School, in Española, New Mexico
- Evergreen Valley High School, in San Jose, California
