= RVHS =

RVHS may refer to:

- River Valley High School (disambiguation)
- Ralston Valley High School, Alvada, Colorado, United States
- Rancho Verde High School, Moreno Valley, California, United States
- Rancocas Valley Regional High School, a high school in Mount Holly Township, New Jersey
- Redbank Valley High School, New Bethlehem, Pennsylvania, United States
- Ridge View High School, Columbia, South Carolina, United States
- Rondout Valley High School, Accord, New York, United States
- Ryburn Valley High School, Sowerby Bridge, West Yorkshire, England
- Rockvale High School, Rockvale, Tennessee, United States
