= Georgetown High School (Texas) =

Coordinates: 30.6618°N 97.6668°W

Georgetown High School 65-60L
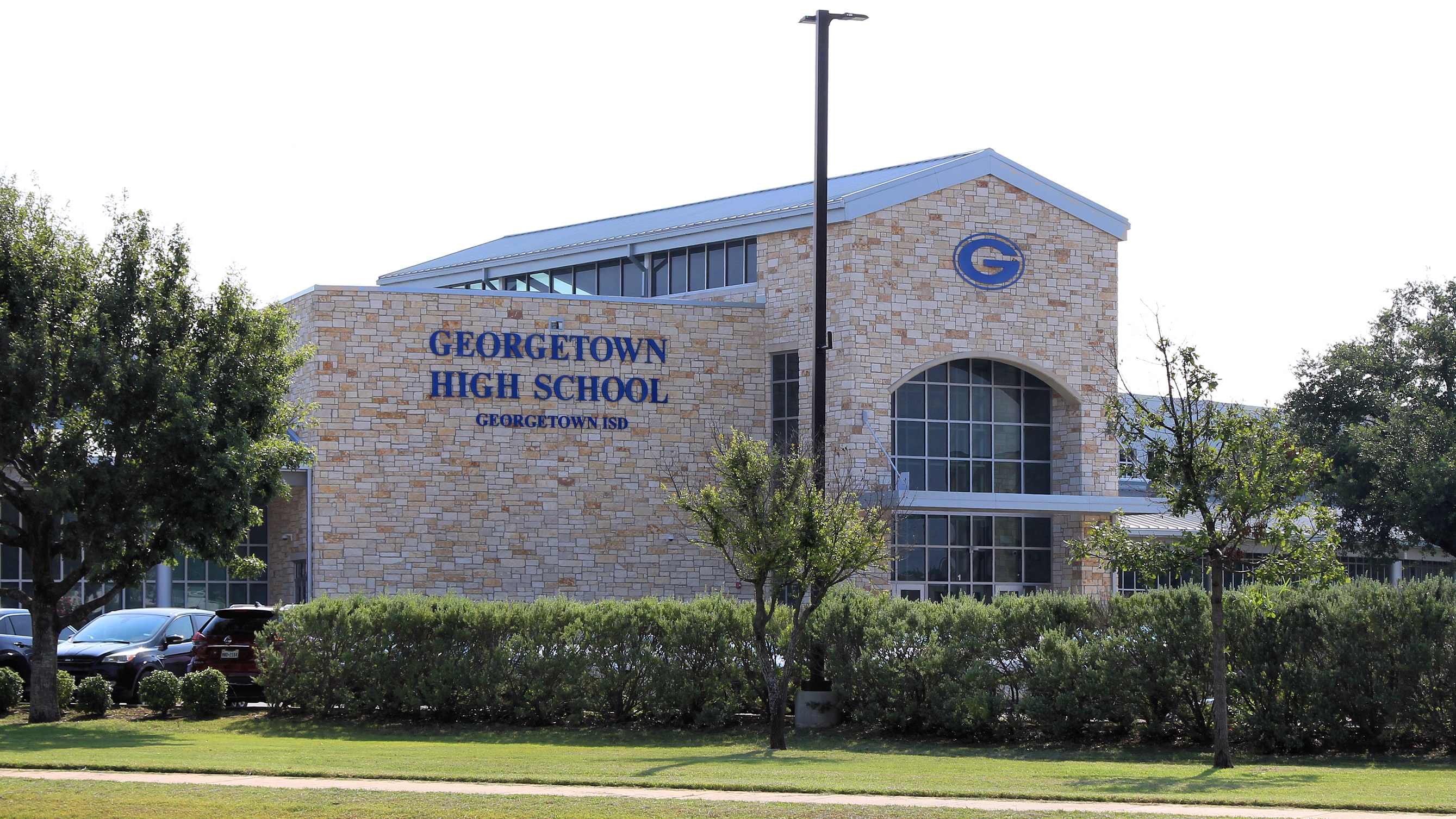

Location
- 2211 N Austin Ave. Georgetown, Texas 78626-4504; United States

Information
- School type: Public high school
- Motto: Eagle Fight Never Dies
- School district: Georgetown Independent School District
- Principal: Jacob Branstetter (Interim)
- Teaching staff: 136.02 (FTE)
- Grades: 9–12
- Enrollment: 2,083 (2025-2026)
- Student to teacher ratio: 14.88
- Colors: Blue and white
- Athletics conference: UIL Class 5A
- Mascot: Eagles
- Yearbook: Aerie
- Website: www.georgetownisd.org/ghs

Georgetown High School is a 5A public high school located in Georgetown, Texas (USA). It is part of the Georgetown Independent School District located in central Williamson County. GHS is a comprehensive high school. The school was a National Blue Ribbon Award winner in 1994–1995. In 2011, the school was rated "Academically Acceptable" by the Texas Education Agency.

== Demographics ==
The demographic breakdown of the 2,083 students enrolled for the 2025-2026 school year was:

- Male - 49%
- Female - 51%
- White - 56.0%
- Hispanic - 33.6%
- Black - 5.1%
- Two or More Races - 3.3%
- Asian - 1.4%
- American Indian/Alaska Native - 0.3%
- Native Hawaiian/Pacific Islander - 0.1%

== Athletics ==
The 12,000-capacity Birkelbach Field is the main stadium of the Georgetown Eagles and East View Patriots. The Georgetown Eagles compete in the following sports: Cross Country, Volleyball, Football, Basketball, Wrestling, Marching Band, Powerlifting, Swimming, Soccer, Golf, Tennis, Track, Lacrosse, Cheerleading, Softball, and Baseball.

=== State titles ===
- Girls' basketball
  - 1979 (3A), 2013 (4A)
- Boys' track
  - 1917 (1A)
- Baseball -
  - 2022(5A)
- One Act Play –
  - 1955 (1A), 1958 (1A), 1965 (2A)
- State Marching Band
  - 1980 (4A), 1981 (4A), 1982 (4A), 1983 (4A), 1984 (4A), 1985 (4A), 2011 (4A)
- Men's swimming
  - 2019 (5A), 2023 (5A), 2024 (5A)

== Notable people ==
Alumni

- Brian Anderson (broadcaster), American sportscaster
- Calvin Anderson, NFL offensive lineman
- Mason Crosby, professional football player
- Conan Gray, musician
- Taylor Jungmann, professional baseball player
- Rebekah Grace "Gracie" Kiltz, inspiration for charitable organizations
- Corey Knebel, All-Star MLB player
- Nick Krause, actor
- Andrew McKirahan, professional baseball player
- Eli Lamar Whiteley, Medal of Honor recipient

Faculty

- Art Briles, football coach
