= Cooper Elementary School =

Cooper Elementary School may refer to elementary schools in the following school districts in the United States:

Alphabetical by state

- Bentonville Public Schools, Bella Vista, Arkansas
- W. J. Cooper Elementary School, Gwinnett County Public Schools, Georgia
- Johnston County Schools, Clayton, North Carolina
- Cooper Independent School District, Texas
- Garland Independent School District, Texas
- Georgetown Independent School District, Texas
- Spring Independent School District, Harris County, Texas
- Hampton City Schools, Virginia
- Sheboygan Area School District, Wisconsin
