= VLHS =

VLHS may refer to:

- Ban Huoeisay Airport, a public use airport in Ban Houayxay, Laos
- Valley Lutheran High School (Michigan), Saginaw, Michigan, United States
- Valley Lutheran High School (Phoenix, Arizona), United States
