= Weir, Texas =

- City
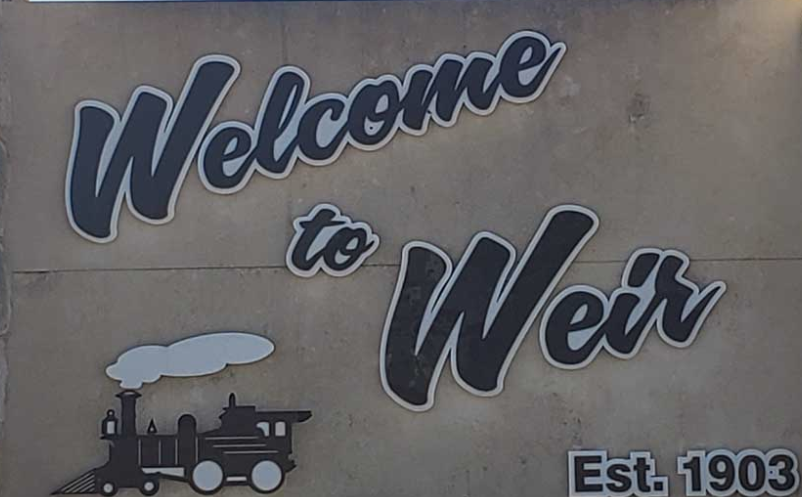
- A picture of some buildings in Weir, Texas

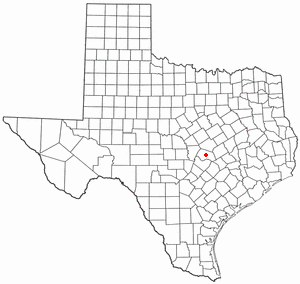
- Location of Weir, Texas

- Coordinates: 30°40′30″N 97°35′16″W
- Country: United States
- State: Texas
- County: Williamson

Area
  - Total: 1.64 sq mi (4.25 km^{2})
  - Land: 1.62 sq mi (4.19 km^{2})
  - Water: 0.027 sq mi (0.07 km^{2})
- Elevation: 682 ft (208 m)

Population (2020)
  - Total: 699
  - Density: 432/sq mi (167/km^{2})
- Time zone: UTC-6 (Central (CST))
  - Summer (DST): UTC-5 (CDT)
- ZIP code: 78674
- Area code: 512
- FIPS code: 48-77056
- GNIS feature ID: 1370999
- Website: www.cityofweir.org

Weir is a city in Williamson County, Texas, United States. Its population was 699 at the 2020 census.

== Geography ==
Weir is located at 30°40′30″N 97°35′16″W (30.675007, –97.587862), about 6 miles northeast of Georgetown and 30 miles north of Austin.

According to the United States Census Bureau, the city has a total area of 1.6 square miles (4.1 km^{2}), all land.

== Demographics ==
Historical population
Census	Pop.	Note	%±
1990	220		—
2000	591		168.6%
2010	450		−23.9%
2020	699		55.3%
U.S. Decennial Census; 2020 Census

=== 2020 census ===
As of the 2020 census, Weir had a population of 699. The median age was 35.6 years; 30.5% of residents were under 18 and 13.0% were 65 or older. For every 100 females, there were 111.2 males, and for every 100 females 18 and over, there were 112.2 males 18 and over.

None of the residents lived in urban areas, while 100.0% lived in rural areas.

Of the 226 households in Weir, 46.9% had children under 18 living in them, 57.5% were married-couple households, 15.0% were households with a male householder and no spouse or partner present, and 20.8% were households with a female householder and no spouse or partner present. About 7.1% of all households were made up of individuals, and 3.5% had someone living alone who was 65 or older.

The city had 232 housing units, of which 2.6% were vacant. The homeowner vacancy rate was 1.1% and the rental vacancy rate was 0.0%.

Racial composition as of the 2020 census
Race	Number	Percent
White	349	49.9%
Black or African American	8	1.1%
American Indian and Alaska Native	1	0.1%
Asian	5	0.7%
Native Hawaiian and other Pacific Islander	0	0.0%
Some other race	132	18.9%
Two or more races	204	29.2%
Hispanic or Latino (of any race)	378	54.1%

=== 2000 census ===
As of the census of 2000, 591 people, 216 households, and 158 families resided in the city. The population density was 371.0 inhabitants per square mile (143.2/km^{2}). The 229 housing units had an average density of 143.7 per square mile (55.5/km^{2}). The racial makeup of the city was 90.36% White, 1.02% African American, 2.88% Native American, 4.06% from other races, and 1.69% from two or more races. Hispanics or Latinos of any race were 16.92% of the population.

Of the 216 households, 42.1% had children under 18 living with them, 58.8% were married couples living together, 10.6% had a female householder with no husband present, and 26.4% were not families; 21.3% of all households were made up of individuals, and 5.6% had someone living alone who was 65 or older. The average household size was 2.74, and the average family size was 3.19.

In the city, the age distribution was 31.1% under 18, 7.6% from 18 to 24, 32.5% from 25 to 44, 20.3% from 45 to 64, and 8.5% who were 65or older. The median age was 32 years. For every 100 females, there were 92.5 males. For every 100 females 18 and over, there were 97.6 males.

The median income in the city for a household was $46,029 and for a family was $47,813. Males had a median income of $32,216 versus $22,386 for females. The per capita income for the city was $19,361. About 3.6% of families and 5.2% of the population were below the poverty line, including 5.9% of those under 18, but none 65 or over.

== History ==
Tennessee-native Thomas Calvin Weir (1826–1901) came to Williamson County in 1856. He bought land in this area and became a prosperous farmer. Alabamian James Francis Towns (1850–1937) came in 1870 and settled nearby on the San Gabriel River. His brother, Robert W. Towns (1848–1938), and he operated a gin and blacksmith shop, as well as Towns Mill. Calvin Weir's son Horace M. Weir was also Weir's first postmaster.

In the late 19th century, the communities of Weir and Townsville (or Towns Mill) grew around these early settlers. Churches included Baptist and Presbyterian congregations that met at the Prairie Springs School, and an African American church met in a school near Mankins Crossing. Calvin Weir's daughter, Lucy, served as postmaster at the post office in Townsville, where she also ran a small store.

The communities developed similarly until 1893, when the Georgetown and Granger Railroad came through Weir, bypassing Townsville. In 1903, after the Missouri, Kansas and Texas Rail-Road (MKT) bought the line, known as the Katy, most area residents moved into the town of Weir, officially established that same year. The Katy Lake Resort, created by MKT on the river at Towns Mill Dam, attracted tourists to the area. The Townsville post office moved to Weir, and with several new businesses, the town began to thrive.

A flood in 1913 damaged the resort and several local businesses, and after a severe drought, World War I and the Great Depression, Weir's population faltered, but began to prosper again in the mid-20th century. Following voter approval, Weir incorporated as a city in 1987.

Weir currently has an active fire station and one that is owned and operated by the county.

== Education ==
The City of Weir is served by the Georgetown Independent School District.

== Notable person ==
- Bill Moyers was a Baptist minister in Weir early in his career of journalism and politics.
