= Levi Drake Rodriguez =

American football player (born 2000)

No. 50 – Minnesota Vikings
- Position: Nose tackle
- Roster status: Active

Personal information
- Born: August 4, 2000 (age 26); Georgetown, Texas, U.S.
- Listed height: 6 ft 2 in (1.88 m)
- Listed weight: 307 lb (139 kg)

Career information
- High school: East View (Georgetown)
- College: SAGU (2019–2021); Texas A&M–Commerce (2022–2023)
- NFL draft: 2024: 7th round, 232nd overall pick

Career history
- Minnesota Vikings (2024–present)

Awards and highlights
- First-team FCS All-American (2023); First-team All-SLC (2023)

Career NFL statistics as of Week 10, 2026
- Total tackles: 65
- Sacks: 5.0
- Pass deflections: 1
- Stats at Pro Football Reference

Levi Drake Rodriguez (born August 4, 2000) is an American professional football nose tackle for the Minnesota Vikings of the National Football League (NFL). He played college football for the SAGU Lions and Texas A&M–Commerce Lions and was selected by the Vikings in the seventh round of the 2024 NFL draft.

== Early life ==
Rodriguez was born on August 4, 2000, and grew up in Georgetown, Texas. At age four, he started playing baseball and football. After initially playing flag football, he started playing tackle at age six, with his mother noting that he switched because "He wanted to tackle people." At approximately eight years old, he wrote down on a whiteboard a goal of becoming a professional football player, which he took each time he moved.

Rodriguez attended East View High School in Georgetown and was a two-way lineman, receiving selection at right tackle to the All-State team in his senior year. Considered small at tackle, he received no major offers to play college football. A zero-star recruit, he ultimately signed to play both baseball and football for Southwestern Assemblies of God University (SAGU)—now known as Nelson University—an National Association of Intercollegiate Athletics (NAIA) program. He had caught the attention of coaches at SAGU when he "two-hand dunked a basketball while wearing cowboy boots", according to The Athletic.

== College career ==
Rodriguez was shifted to being a defensive end with the SAGU Lions football team, and although considered "really raw", he was chosen first-team All-Sooner Athletic Conference (SAC) at the end of the year, having totaled 44 tackles, 10.0 tackles-for-loss (TFLs), 5.0 sacks and a forced fumble in 10 games played (seven starts). In the COVID-19-shortened 2020 season, he started seven games and was named second-team All-SAC, recording 31 tackles, 6.5 TFLs and 2.5 sacks. In his third year, he started 12 games and made 58 tackles, 13.5 TFLs, 7.0 sacks and a forced fumble, being selected first-team All-SAC and first-team National Christian College Athletic Association (NCCAA) All-American.

In 2022, Rodriguez became concerned about whether he would receive attention from scouts. Debating whether to leave SAGU, he went on a fast for a week and "then went to sit at a park with his Bible, vowing not to leave until he had an answer". According to The Athletic, he said that "he heard God tell him to go". Rodriguez sent an email to the defensive line coach of the then-NCAA Division II program Texas A&M–Commerce Lions. The coach was impressed and invited Rodriguez to a football camp; he said that he was "busy checking in high schoolers at football camp when 'this grown behemoth of a man walks in'", and "he knew right away who it was". The coach later described Rodriguez as "a man amongst boys [with] the violence and the intensity that he moves with. There were times where an offensive lineman could do everything right from a technique perspective and he was just too much of a force to handle."

Rodriguez ultimately transferred to the Lions – who had just moved up to the NCAA Division I FCS level – and moved from defensive end to defensive tackle. He gained 30 pounds (14 kg) for the position change and started 11 games during the 2022 season, finishing with 32 tackles, 6.0 TFLs and 2.0 sacks. He returned for a final season in 2023 and was named first-team All-Southland Conference (SLC), first-team FCS All-American by Pro Football Focus (PFF) and to the All-Non-FBS team by Dave Campbell's Texas Football. He finished with 10 games started and totaled 56 tackles, 7.5 TFLs, 5.5 sacks, two fumble recoveries and a forced fumble. His 56 tackles were second on the team, while he led the SLC in sacks and was fourth in the conference in TFLs.

Rodriguez ended his stint at Texas A&M–Commerce having recorded 88 tackles, 13.5 TFLs, 7.5 sacks, two fumble recoveries and a forced fumble in 21 games, each of which he started. He appeared in 50 games, 47 as a starter, in his collegiate career, having 221 tackles, 43.5 TFLs, 22.0 sacks and three forced fumbles.

At Texas A&M–Commerce, Rodriguez was noted for his work ethic. He disliked being second to the practice facility behind the custodians, and thus he began sleeping there on the field. His defensive coordinator said that by the time the coaches arrived at 5 a.m., Rodriguez "was already on the field, sweating and putting himself through individual work, busy drilling his hands and his feet". The coordinator said that "Then he goes to practice – that's not normal". His head coach, Clint Dolezel, said that when he first saw Rodriguez practice against the team's offensive line, "I was probably hard on the offensive line ... because we were just getting whipped. 'What are we doing? We're awful!' Well, no, he's pretty good." Rodriguez also was noted to be often eating at practices in order to increase his size: his coach from SAGU said that he hid food within his uniforms, including mangoes in his pants, Twizzlers in his helmet, as well as "peanut butter and jelly sandwiches, gummy bears", and one instance where he personally cut with a knife and ate raw cane sugar in between drills.

In December 2023, Rodriguez graduated with a Bachelor of Science in criminal justice.

== Professional career ==
Pre-draft measurables
Height	Weight	Arm length	Hand span	Wingspan	40-yard dash	10-yard split	20-yard split	20-yard shuttle	Three-cone drill	Vertical jump	Broad jump	Bench press
6 ft 2 in (1.88 m)	300 lb (136 kg)	32 3/8 in (0.82 m)	10 1/4 in (0.26 m)	6 ft 7 3/8 in (2.02 m)	5.01 s	1.79 s	2.94 s	4.68 s	7.64 s	26 in (0.66 m)	8 ft 11 in (2.72 m)	26 reps
All values from Pro Day

Rodriguez initially received little attention as a prospect for the NFL draft, but began getting noticed after being named the most valuable player of the Tropical Bowl with 3.5 sacks, and having an impressive pro day performance. Clint Dolezel said that, of Rodriguez's pro day performance: "He freaking dominated. Smaller guys in his position were fatigued and struggling towards the end. He finished and he says, 'That's it?'" He weighed at 290 pounds (130 kg) in college but began adding weight with what The Athletic described as a "eat-as-much-as-humanly-possible diet", as he was considered small for a defensive tackle. He had added 7 pounds (3.2 kg) by the time of the Tropical Bowl and was 306 pounds (139 kg) by the time of the draft.

Prior to the 2024 NFL draft, Rodriguez was chronicled anonymously by The Athletic as their yearly "Prospect X" – identifying the "most overlooked player" in the draft. He was ultimately selected in the seventh round (232nd overall) of the draft by the Minnesota Vikings. He became the first person from East View High School to be chosen in the draft and was the first Texas A&M–Commerce player selected since Antonio Wilson in 2000, who was also selected by Minnesota.

On November 2, 2025, during a Week 9 game against the Detroit Lions, Rodriguez blocked a field goal in the fourth quarter, which was then returned by Isaiah Rodgers to the Lions’ 26-yard line. The Vikings would go on to win 27–24, and Rodriguez won NFC Special Teams Player of the Week.

In week 10 of the 2026 NFL season against the Green Bay Packers, he recorded two sacks on Jordan Love, this was the first game with multiple sacks for Rodriguez. He finished the game with four quarterback hits in the 30–10 win.

== Personal life ==
Rodriguez is a devout Christian. He led 63 of his college teammates to get baptized. On his forearm, he has a tattoo of Psalm 23:4: "Though I walk through the valley of the shadow of death, I shall fear no evil, for you are with me; your rod and your staff, they comfort me."

Rodriguez is of Mexican descent.
