= South Bethlehem, Pennsylvania =

Borough in Pennsylvania, US

- Borough
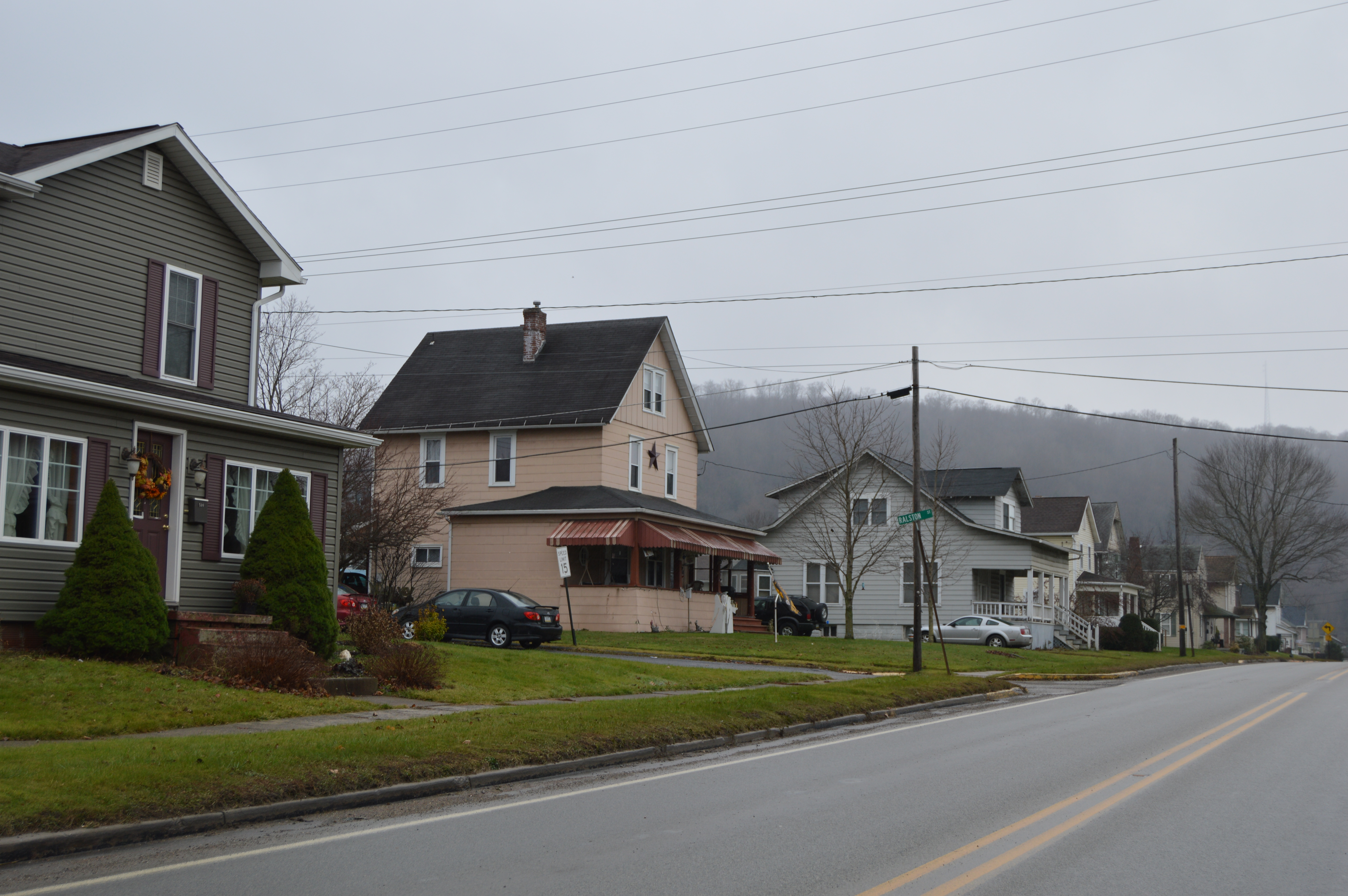
- Houses along Broad Street in South Bethlehem, Pennsylvania, December 2014

- Location of South Bethlehem in Armstrong County, Pennsylvania.

- Location within Pennsylvania
- Coordinates: 40°59′58″N 79°20′21″W
- Country: United States
- State: Pennsylvania
- County: Armstrong

Government
  - Type: Borough Council
  - Mayor: Randall Stahlman

Area
  - Total: 0.15 sq mi (0.39 km^{2})
  - Land: 0.15 sq mi (0.39 km^{2})
  - Water: 0 sq mi (0.00 km^{2})
- Elevation: 1,080 ft (330 m)

Population (2020)
  - Total: 489
  - Density: 3,215.7/sq mi (1,241.59/km^{2})
- Time zone: UTC-5 (Eastern (EST))
  - Summer (DST): UTC-4 (EDT)
- FIPS code: 42-71976

South Bethlehem is a borough in Armstrong County, Pennsylvania, United States. The population was 489 at the 2020 census.

== Geography ==
South Bethlehem is located in northern Armstrong County in western Pennsylvania on the south side of Redbank Creek at 40°59′58″N 79°20′21″W (40.999516, −79.339219). It is bordered to the northeast by the borough of New Bethlehem, which is across Redbank Creek in Clarion County. Neither South Bethlehem nor New Bethlehem are adjacent to the city of Bethlehem, which is in eastern Pennsylvania.

Pennsylvania Routes 28 and 66 pass through South Bethlehem, leading southwest 19 miles (31 km) to Kittanning. Route 28 leads northeast 20 miles (32 km) to Brookville, and Route 66 leads north 17 miles (27 km) to Clarion, both of which towns are near Interstate 80.

According to the U.S. Census Bureau, South Bethlehem has a total area of 0.15 square miles (0.4 km^{2}), all land.

== Demographics ==
Historical population
Census	Pop.	Note	%±
1890	111		—
1900	183		64.9%
1910	439		139.9%
1920	485		10.5%
1930	469		−3.3%
1940	561		19.6%
1950	489		−12.8%
1960	510		4.3%
1970	500		−2.0%
1980	476		−4.8%
1990	479		0.6%
2000	444		−7.3%
2010	481		8.3%
2020	489		1.7%
U.S. Decennial Census

As of the 2000 census, there were 444 people, 194 households, and 130 families residing in the borough. The population density was 2,746.6 inhabitants per square mile (1,060.5/km^{2}). There were 208 housing units at an average density of 1,286.7 per square mile (496.8/km^{2}). The racial makeup of the borough was 99.32% White and 0.68% African American.

There were 194 households, out of which 26.8% had children under the age of 18 living with them, 59.3% were married couples living together, 4.1% had a female householder with no husband present, and 32.5% were non-families. 31.4% of all households were made up of individuals, and 17.5% had someone living alone who was 65 years of age or older. The average household size was 2.29, and the average family size was 2.84.

The borough median age of 41 years was slightly more than the county median age of 40 years. The distribution by age group was 23.6% under the age of 18, 5.6% from 18 to 24, 24.8% from 25 to 44, 22.7% from 45 to 64, and 23.2% who were 65 years of age or older. The median age was 41 years. For every 100 females, there were 100.9 males. For every 100 females age 18 and over, there were 93.7 males.

The median income for a household in the borough was $29,688, and the median income for a family was $43,125. Males had a median income of $28,269 versus $26,000 for females. The per capita income for the borough was $16,266. About 9.1% of families and 11.1% of the population were below the poverty line, including 16.3% of those under age 18 and 11.4% of those age 65 or over.

== Education ==
The public school district for South Bethlehem, Pennsylvania, is Redbank Valley School District.

== History ==
South Bethlehem appears on the 1876 Atlas of Armstrong County, Pennsylvania. It was founded by William R. Hamilton on land he purchased from Lewis Daubenspecht. The land was part of a tract of 280,990 acres, conveyed to Willem Willink, who was an investor in the Holland Land Company, on warrant 2896 on September 6, 1802.
