= Gracie Kiltz =

Inspiration for charity

Rebekah Grace "Gracie" Kiltz
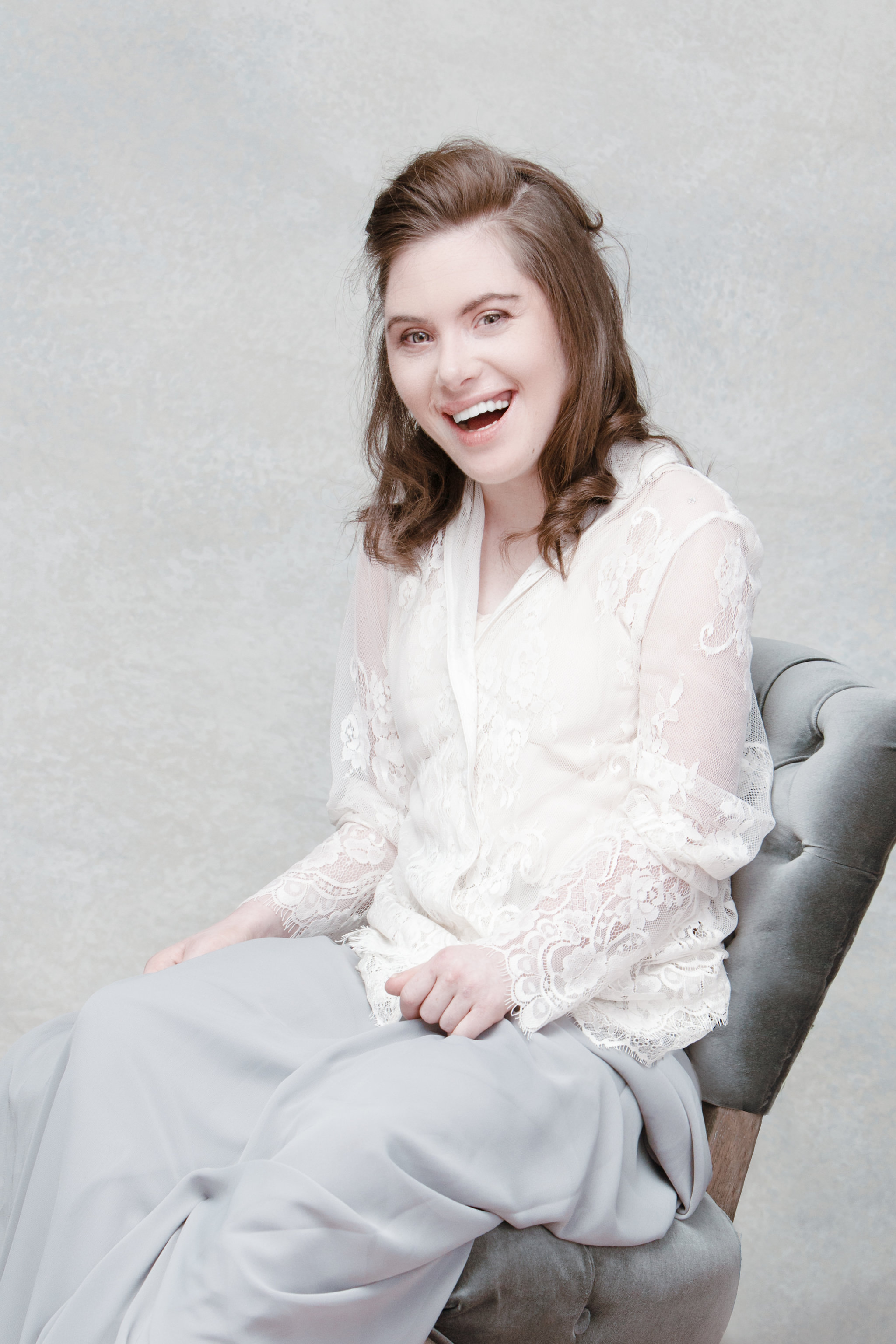
- Born: May 17, 1992
- Died: September 8, 2018 (aged 26)
- Monuments: Gracie Kiltz Lane in Austin, Texas
- Organization(s): Inspired His Grace Foundation and Brookwood in Georgetown (BiG)
- Parent(s): Erin and John Kiltz

Rebekah Grace "Gracie" Kiltz (May 17, 1992 – September 8, 2018) was the inspiration for two non-profit organizations: His Grace Foundation and Brookwood in Georgetown, Texas. Gracie was born with Down syndrome in 1992, battled leukemia and experienced life-altering brain damage. Her experience motivated her parents, John and Erin Kiltz, to support patients and families on the Bone Marrow Transplant Unit of Texas Children's Hospital in Houston. They founded His Grace Foundation in 1997.

When Gracie became a young adult, her parents launched Brookwood in Georgetown (BiG), a vocational community for adults with disabilities in the vein of the Brookwood Community.

Gracie was featured on ABC World News when she was crowned Homecoming Queen of Georgetown High School in 2010. Gracie's story will be featured in the forthcoming compilation The Triumph Book: Raising Wheels, a collection of stories written by "parents raising differently abled children as well as the motivating examples of those who are personally achieving greatness by living life on wheels". Gracie's story has also been cited in Stand Up: How to Flourish When the Odds Are Stacked Against You by Rene' Banglesdorf, The Buzz Magazines, and Georgetown View Magazine. Her story is also featured on the website for Adaptive Sports Center in Crested Butte, Colorado. In November 2019, Gracie Kiltz Lane was developed at The Domain in Austin, Texas. On November 15, 2022, Georgetown High School stated that they will induct Gracie into the Georgetown High School Hall of Honor Class of 2023 at a ceremony on February 23, 2023.
