= Riddle, Oregon =

- City
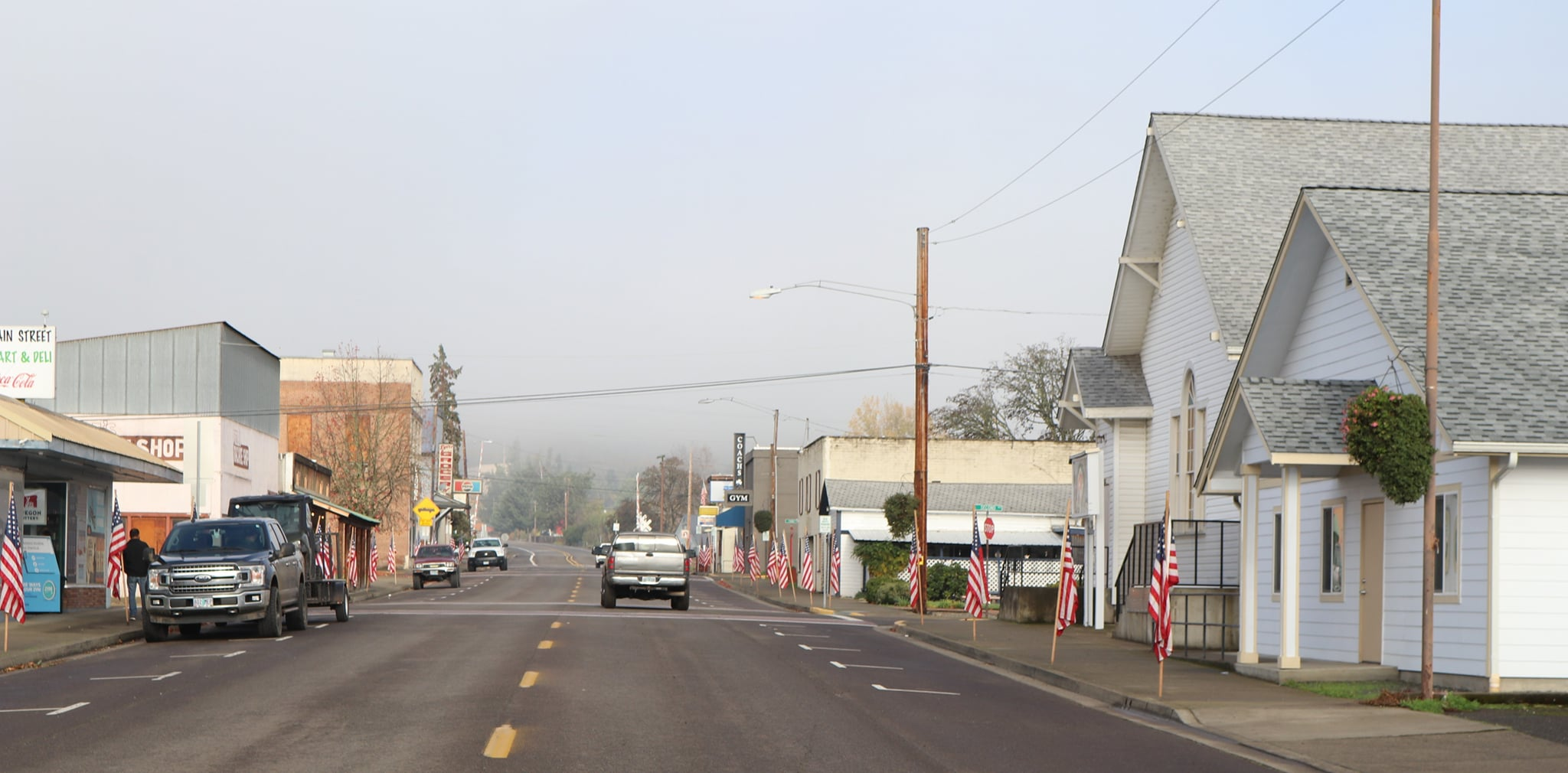
- Main Street in Riddle with First Baptist Church in the foreground

- Location in Oregon
- Coordinates: 42°57′24″N 123°22′15″W
- Country: United States
- State: Oregon
- County: Douglas
- Incorporated: 1893

Area
  - Total: 0.63 sq mi (1.64 km^{2})
  - Land: 0.63 sq mi (1.64 km^{2})
  - Water: 0 sq mi (0.00 km^{2})
- Elevation: 712 ft (217 m)

Population (2020)
  - Total: 1,214
  - Density: 1,912.6/sq mi (738.45/km^{2})
- Time zone: UTC−8 (Pacific)
  - Summer (DST): UTC−7 (Pacific)
- ZIP code: 97469
- Area code: 541
- FIPS code: 41-61850
- GNIS feature ID: 2410943

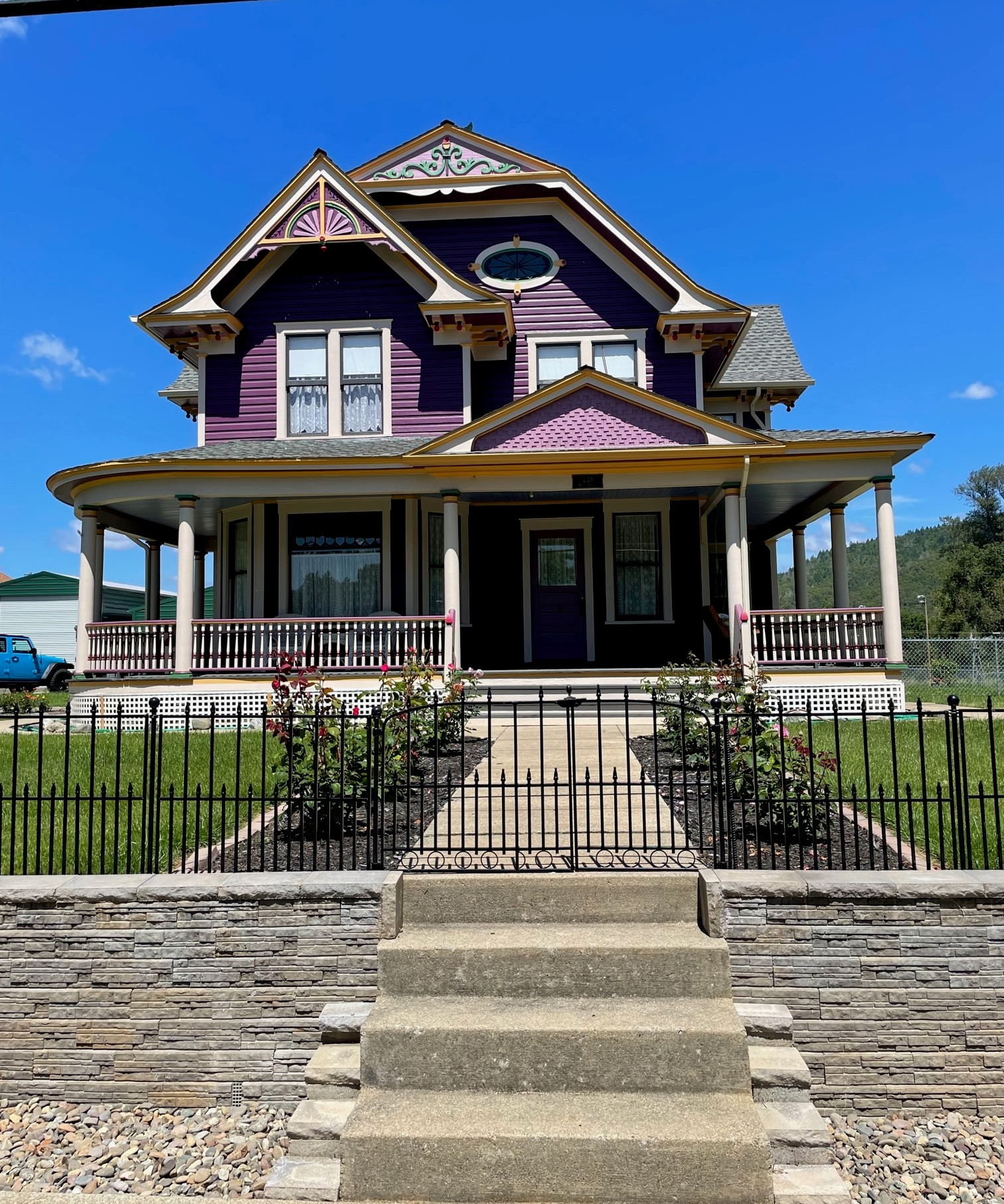
The original founders home (J.B. Riddle) in 2023.

Riddle is a city in Douglas County, Oregon, United States. As of the 2020 census, Riddle had a population of 1,215.

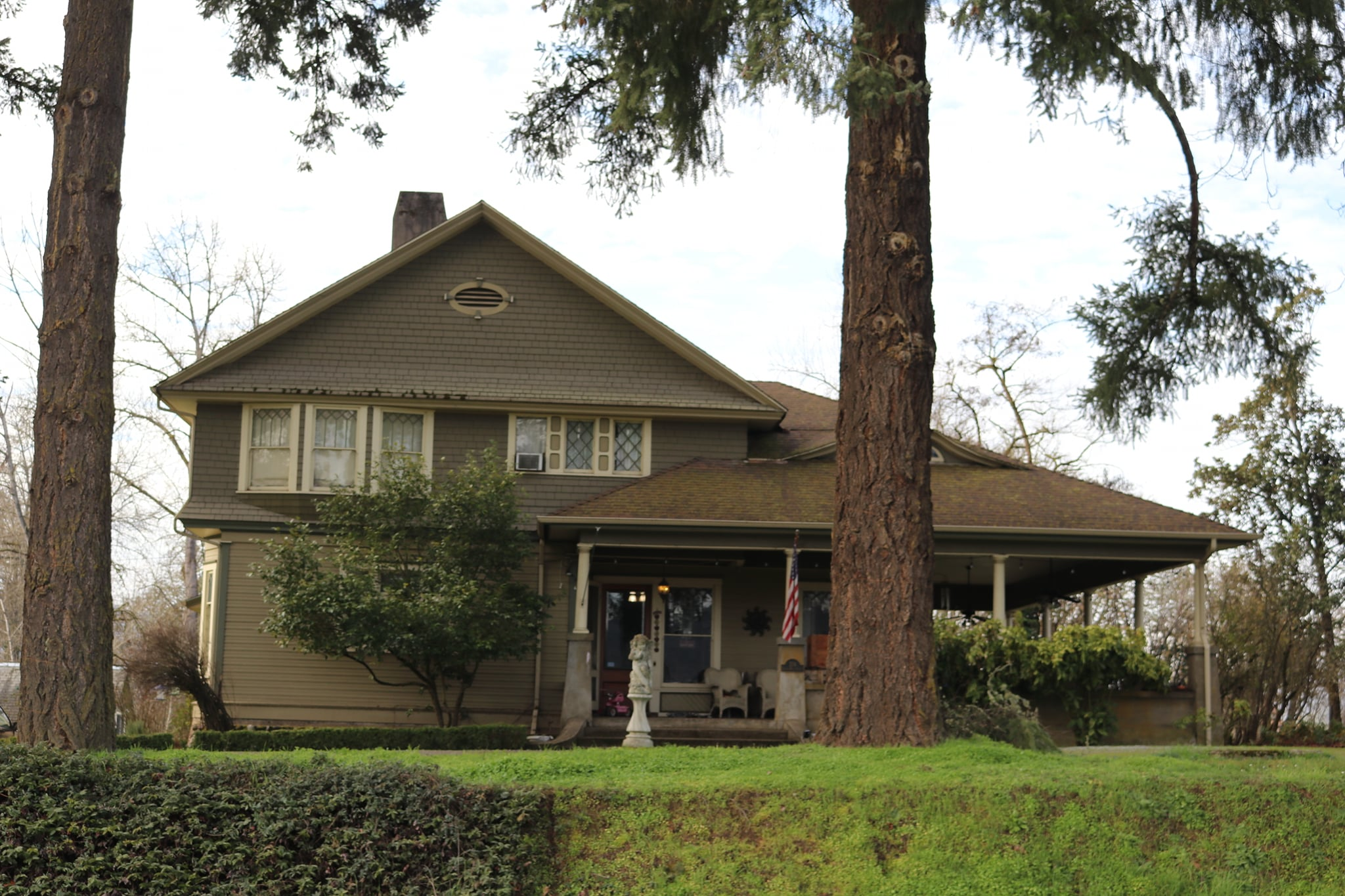
The Brown House, built in 1894, is listed on the US National Register of Historic Places.

== History ==
Riddle was founded by John Bouseman Riddle, the son of William H. Riddle, for whom the town was named. William H. Riddle was a native of Springfield, Illinois, who settled in the area in 1851. By 1881, the Southern Pacific Railroad line south of Roseburg had a station here called "Riddlesburg", which was changed to "Riddles" in 1882 and to "Riddle" in 1889. A post office at this location opened under the name of "Riddles" in 1882 and was changed to "Riddle" in 1910.

J. B. Riddle purchased a land claim from J.Q.C. VanDenbosch at the age of nineteen in the year 1863. In 1869, Riddle sold 140.5 acres of his claim to his brother, Abner. When the railroad came through, it passed between the brothers' properties. J.B. took advantage of the opportunity afforded by the railroad and changed his profession to business from farming. He and his second wife, Mary Catching, built a hotel in what would become the city of Riddle, where J.B. opened several small eating houses to Medford, Oregon along the tracks.

A community recreation center was added to the town in 2024.

== Demographics ==
Historical population
Census	Pop.	Note	%±
1900	131		—
1910	187		42.7%
1920	268		43.3%
1930	195		−27.2%
1940	214		9.7%
1950	634		196.3%
1960	992		56.5%
1970	1,042		5.0%
1980	1,265		21.4%
1990	1,143		−9.6%
2000	1,014		−11.3%
2010	1,185		16.9%
2020	1,214		2.4%
U.S. Decennial Census

=== 2020 census ===
As of the 2020 census, Riddle had a population of 1,214. The median age was 39.1 years. 24.5% of residents were under the age of 18 and 16.3% of residents were 65 years of age or older. For every 100 females there were 102.7 males, and for every 100 females age 18 and over there were 99.8 males age 18 and over.

97.9% of residents lived in urban areas, while 2.1% lived in rural areas.

There were 488 households in Riddle, of which 30.7% had children under the age of 18 living in them. Of all households, 39.3% were married-couple households, 23.2% were households with a male householder and no spouse or partner present, and 26.8% were households with a female householder and no spouse or partner present. About 25.8% of all households were made up of individuals and 11.2% had someone living alone who was 65 years of age or older.

There were 522 housing units, of which 6.5% were vacant. Among occupied housing units, 60.5% were owner-occupied and 39.5% were renter-occupied. The homeowner vacancy rate was 2.6% and the rental vacancy rate was 3.5%.

Racial composition as of the 2020 census
Race	Number	Percent
White	1,087	89.5%
Black or African American	0	0%
American Indian and Alaska Native	34	2.8%
Asian	9	0.7%
Native Hawaiian and Other Pacific Islander	0	0%
Some other race	24	2.0%
Two or more races	60	4.9%
Hispanic or Latino (of any race)	67	5.5%

=== 2010 census ===
As of the 2010 census, there were 1,185 people, 460 households, and 307 families residing in the city. The population density was 1,881.0 inhabitants per square mile (726.3/km^{2}). There were 491 housing units at an average density of 779.4 per square mile (300.9/km^{2}). The racial makeup of the city was 89.7% White, 0.3% African American, 3.0% Native American, 0.5% Asian, 0.1% Pacific Islander, 1.2% from other races, and 5.2% from two or more races. Hispanic or Latino of any race were 5.1% of the population.

Racial Makeup of Riddle as of 2010 Census
Race	Percentage
White	89.7%
African American	0.3%
Native American	3.0%
Asian	0.5%
Pacific Islander	0.1%
Other races	1.2%
Two or more races	5.2%
Hispanic or Latino	5.1%

There were 460 households, of which 36.5% had children under the age of 18 living with them. Married couples living together constituted 44.8%, while 17.0% had a female householder with no husband present, 5.0% had a male householder with no wife present, and 33.3% were non-families. Individuals made up 25.2% of all households, and 8.9% had someone living alone who was 65 years of age or older. The average household size was 2.57 people and the average family size was 3.01.

The median age in the city was 36.6 years. Residents were under the age of 18 made up 25.4% of the population; 9.7% were between the ages of 18 and 24; 25.3% were from 25 to 44; 28.2% were from 45 to 64; and 11.4% were 65 years of age or older. The gender makeup of the city was 48.9% male and 51.1% female.

=== 2000 census ===
As of the census of 2000, there were 1,014 people, 381 households, and 265 families residing in the city. The population density was 1,519.6 inhabitants per square mile (586.7/km^{2}). There were 406 housing units at an average density of 608.5 per square mile (234.9/km^{2}). The racial makeup of the city was 94.48% White, 2.27% Native American, 0.1% Asian, 0.2% from other races, and 2.96% from two or more races. Hispanic or Latino of any race were 1.97% of the population.

Racial Makeup of Riddle as of 2000 Census
Race	Percentage
White	94.48%
Native American	2.27%
Asian	0.1%
Other races	0.2%
Two or more races	2.96%
Hispanic or Latino	1.97%

There were 381 households, out of which 36.0% had children under the age of 18 living with them, 50.4% were married couples living together, 13.6% had a female householder with no husband present, and 30.2% were non-families. Individuals made up 24.4% of all households, and 10% had someone living alone who was 65 years of age or older. The average household size was 2.66 people and the average family size was 3.15.

In the city, the population was spread out, with 31.2% under the age of 18, 9.4% from 18 to 24, 25.7% from 25 to 44, 21.8% from 45 to 64, and 11.9% who were 65 years of age or older. The median age was 33 years. For every 100 females, there were 96.1 males. For every 100 females age 18 and over, there were 84.7 males.

The median income for a household in the city was $28,750, and the median income for a family was $37,159. Males had a median income of $31,438 versus $27,232 for females. The per capita income for the city was $13,666. About 16.1% of families and 19.0% of the population were below the poverty line, including 21.1% of those under age 18 and 10.6% of those age 65 or over.

== Geography ==
Riddle is about 25 miles (40 km) south of Roseburg and 220 miles (350 km) south of Portland. It lies about 4 miles (6.4 km) west of Oregon Route 99 (Interstate 5) at an elevation of about 700 feet (210 m) above sea level. Cow Creek flows by Riddle before entering the nearby South Umpqua River.

According to the United States Census Bureau, the city has a total area of 0.63 square miles (1.63 km^{2}), all of it land.

=== Climate ===
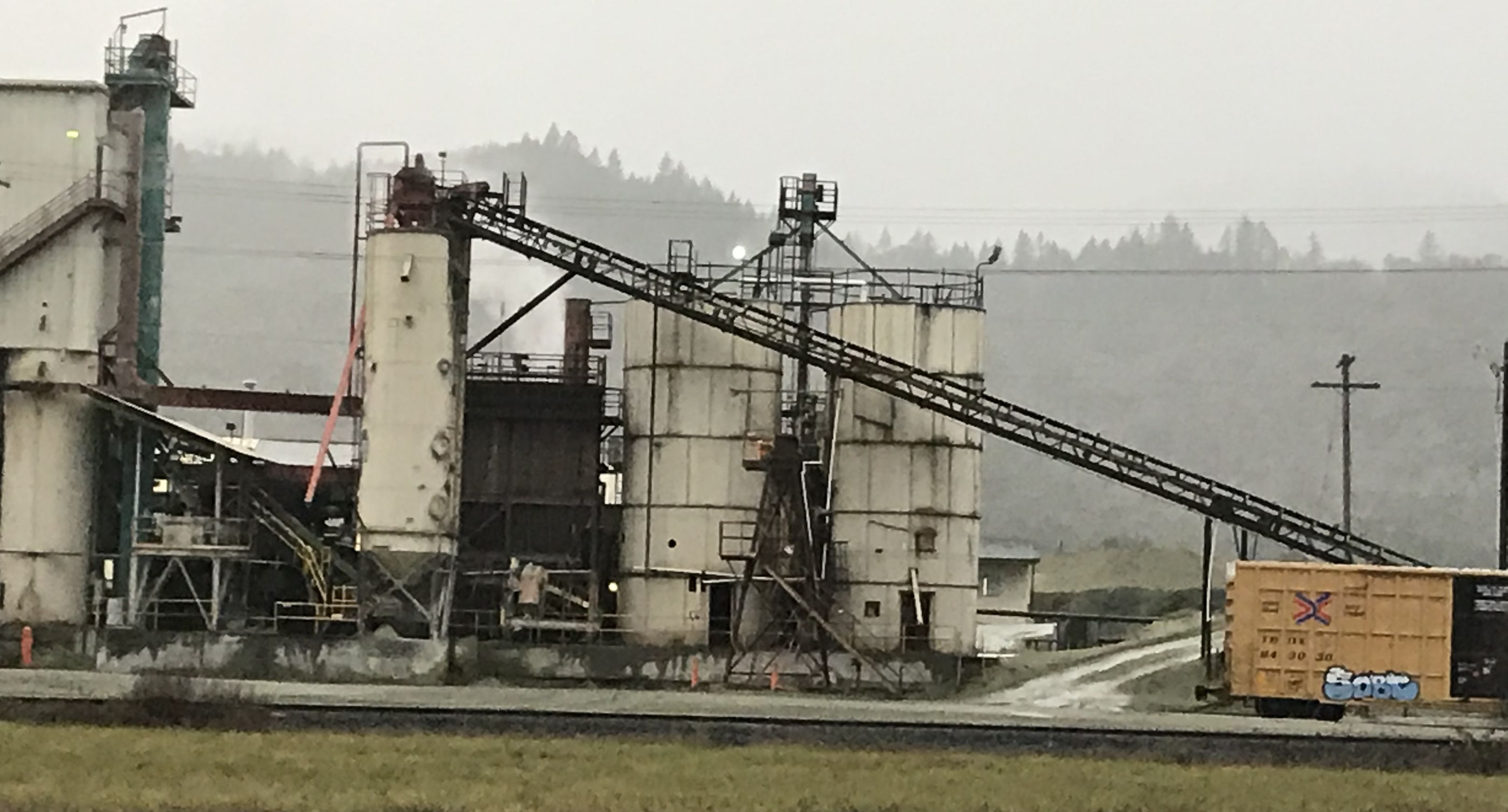
Roseburg Forest Products mill, which is a large employer in the community.

Riddle has a warm-summer Mediterranean climate (Csb) according to the Köppen climate classification system. Summers are cool during the mornings but become hot by afternoon, whilst winters are chilly, if not severe, and rainy. During hot spells in the summer, there are 28 afternoons reaching over 90 °F or 32.2 °C and three afternoons over 100 °F or 37.8 °C, although only five mornings have ever stayed at or above 68 °F or 20 °C. The hottest afternoon has been 111 °F (43.9 °C) on June 27, 2021, and the hottest morning 72 °F (22.2 °C) on June 28, 2015. The hottest month on record has been July 2015 with a mean of 75.1 °F (23.9 °C), although the hottest mean maximum is 93.6 °F or 34.2 °C in July 1938 and August 1939.

During winter, most days feature westerly surface and aloft winds, although rainfall is restricted by the coastal mountains. On rare occasions, a block in the Gulf of Alaska will drive cold air from the continent west of the Sierra/Cascade crest, producing much colder than normal weather with either snow or clear skies. The coldest month on record has been January 1937 with a mean of 32.7 °F (0.4 °C) and a maximum of 40.0 °F (4.4 °C). The coldest temperature on record has been −3 °F (−19.4 °C) on January 22, 1962, while the coldest maximum temperature was 20 °F (−6.7 °C) on December 21, 1990.

The wettest year was from July 1973 to June 1974 with 50.01 inches (1,270.3 mm) and the driest from July 1976 to June 1977 with 16.20 inches (411.5 mm). The wettest day on record has been November 20, 2012 when 4.43 inches (112.5 mm) fell, and the wettest month December 1996 with 16.72 inches (424.7 mm). Snowfall is rare: the mean is 5.2 inches or 0.13 metres; although the most in one month was 42.9 inches (1.09 m) in January 1950 and the most on the ground was 13 inches or 0.33 metres on January 13, 1930, eighteen seasons have had zero snowfall and four more only a trace.

Climate data for Riddle, Oregon, 1991–2020 normals, extremes 1899–present
Month	Jan	Feb	Mar	Apr	May	Jun	Jul	Aug	Sep	Oct	Nov	Dec	Year
Record high °F (°C)	73 (23)	80 (27)	86 (30)	95 (35)	106 (41)	111 (44)	108 (42)	110 (43)	108 (42)	102 (39)	81 (27)	74 (23)	111 (44)
Mean maximum °F (°C)	63.8 (17.7)	68.8 (20.4)	75.4 (24.1)	82.9 (28.3)	90.0 (32.2)	93.6 (34.2)	98.8 (37.1)	100.4 (38.0)	97.5 (36.4)	86.3 (30.2)	71.6 (22.0)	62.7 (17.1)	103.0 (39.4)
Mean daily maximum °F (°C)	52.7 (11.5)	57.1 (13.9)	61.5 (16.4)	66.2 (19.0)	73.6 (23.1)	79.5 (26.4)	88.2 (31.2)	88.8 (31.6)	83.6 (28.7)	71.0 (21.7)	57.9 (14.4)	50.6 (10.3)	69.2 (20.7)
Daily mean °F (°C)	44.8 (7.1)	47.2 (8.4)	50.2 (10.1)	53.8 (12.1)	60.1 (15.6)	65.3 (18.5)	71.7 (22.1)	71.4 (21.9)	66.0 (18.9)	57.1 (13.9)	49.3 (9.6)	43.7 (6.5)	56.7 (13.7)
Mean daily minimum °F (°C)	36.9 (2.7)	37.2 (2.9)	38.8 (3.8)	41.4 (5.2)	46.6 (8.1)	51.1 (10.6)	55.3 (12.9)	54.0 (12.2)	48.5 (9.2)	43.3 (6.3)	40.7 (4.8)	36.7 (2.6)	44.2 (6.8)
Mean minimum °F (°C)	27.2 (−2.7)	27.7 (−2.4)	29.7 (−1.3)	31.8 (−0.1)	36.1 (2.3)	41.6 (5.3)	46.7 (8.2)	45.9 (7.7)	39.0 (3.9)	31.7 (−0.2)	29.5 (−1.4)	26.8 (−2.9)	22.2 (−5.4)
Record low °F (°C)	2 (−17)	8 (−13)	20 (−7)	23 (−5)	26 (−3)	34 (1)	35 (2)	36 (2)	24 (−4)	17 (−8)	13 (−11)	3 (−16)	2 (−17)
Average precipitation inches (mm)	4.72 (120)	3.35 (85)	3.39 (86)	2.53 (64)	1.86 (47)	0.98 (25)	0.27 (6.9)	0.28 (7.1)	0.71 (18)	2.25 (57)	4.57 (116)	6.17 (157)	31.08 (789)
Average snowfall inches (cm)	0.5 (1.3)	0.7 (1.8)	0.1 (0.25)	0.0 (0.0)	0.0 (0.0)	0.0 (0.0)	0.0 (0.0)	0.0 (0.0)	0.0 (0.0)	0.0 (0.0)	0.0 (0.0)	0.6 (1.5)	1.9 (4.85)
Average precipitation days (≥ 0.01 in)	19.4	16.6	17.9	15.8	11.5	6.4	1.9	1.8	4.9	11.8	18.9	20.4	147.3
Average snowy days (≥ 0.1 in)	0.3	0.4	0.1	0.0	0.0	0.0	0.0	0.0	0.0	0.0	0.0	0.4	1.2
Source 1: NOAA
Source 2: National Weather Service

== Education ==
Riddle Elementary School.

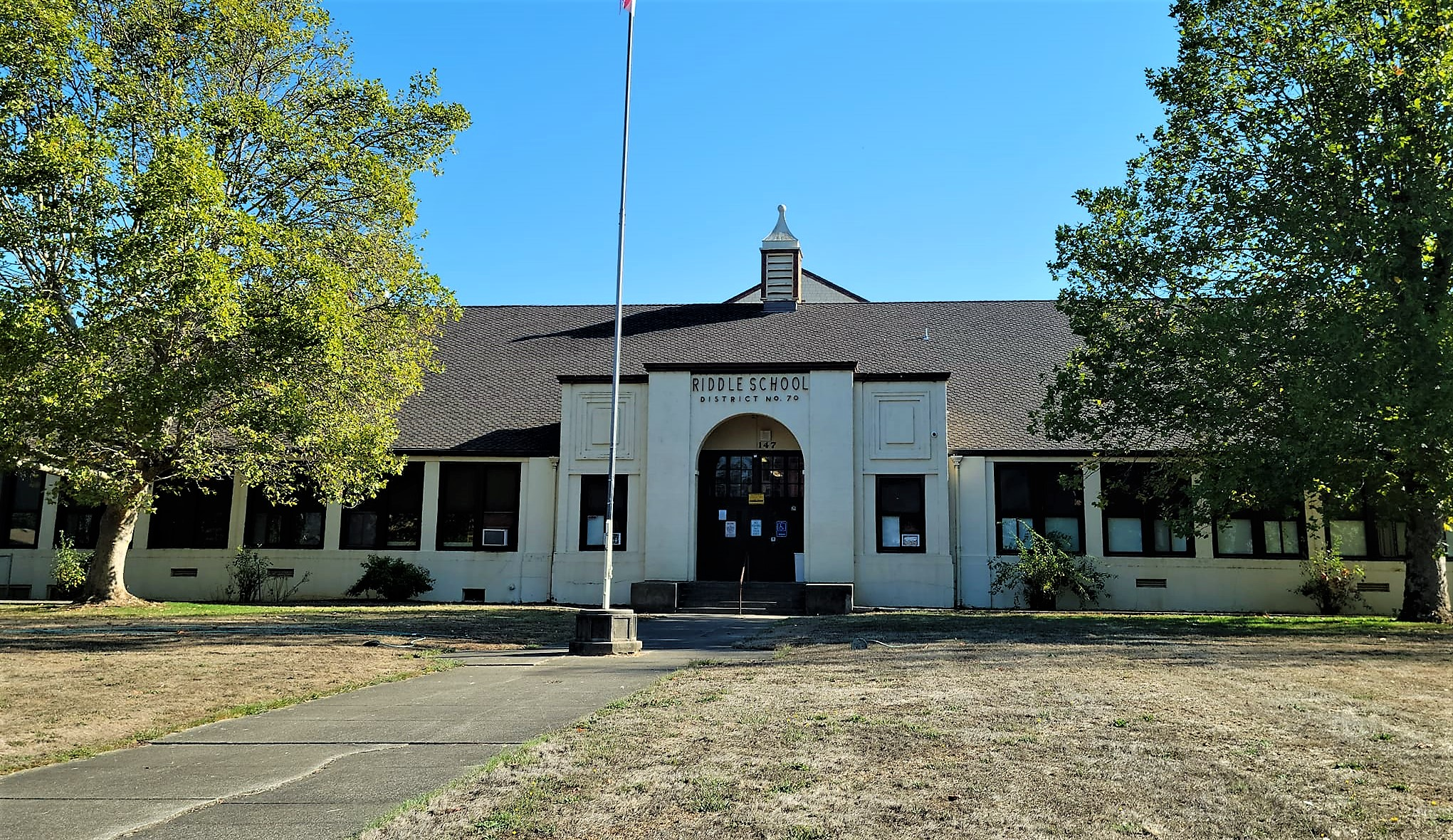
Riddle High School founded in 1935.

The Riddle School District provides primary and secondary public education in the city. The district operates Riddle Elementary School and Riddle Junior/Senior High School.

== Economy ==
The Riddle area was known for nickel mining, with several square miles of nickel-bearing garnierite surface deposits nearby. The mine closed in 1987.
