= New Bethlehem, Pennsylvania =

Borough in Pennsylvania, US

New Bethlehem, Pennsylvania Was Gumtown, Pennsylvania
- Borough
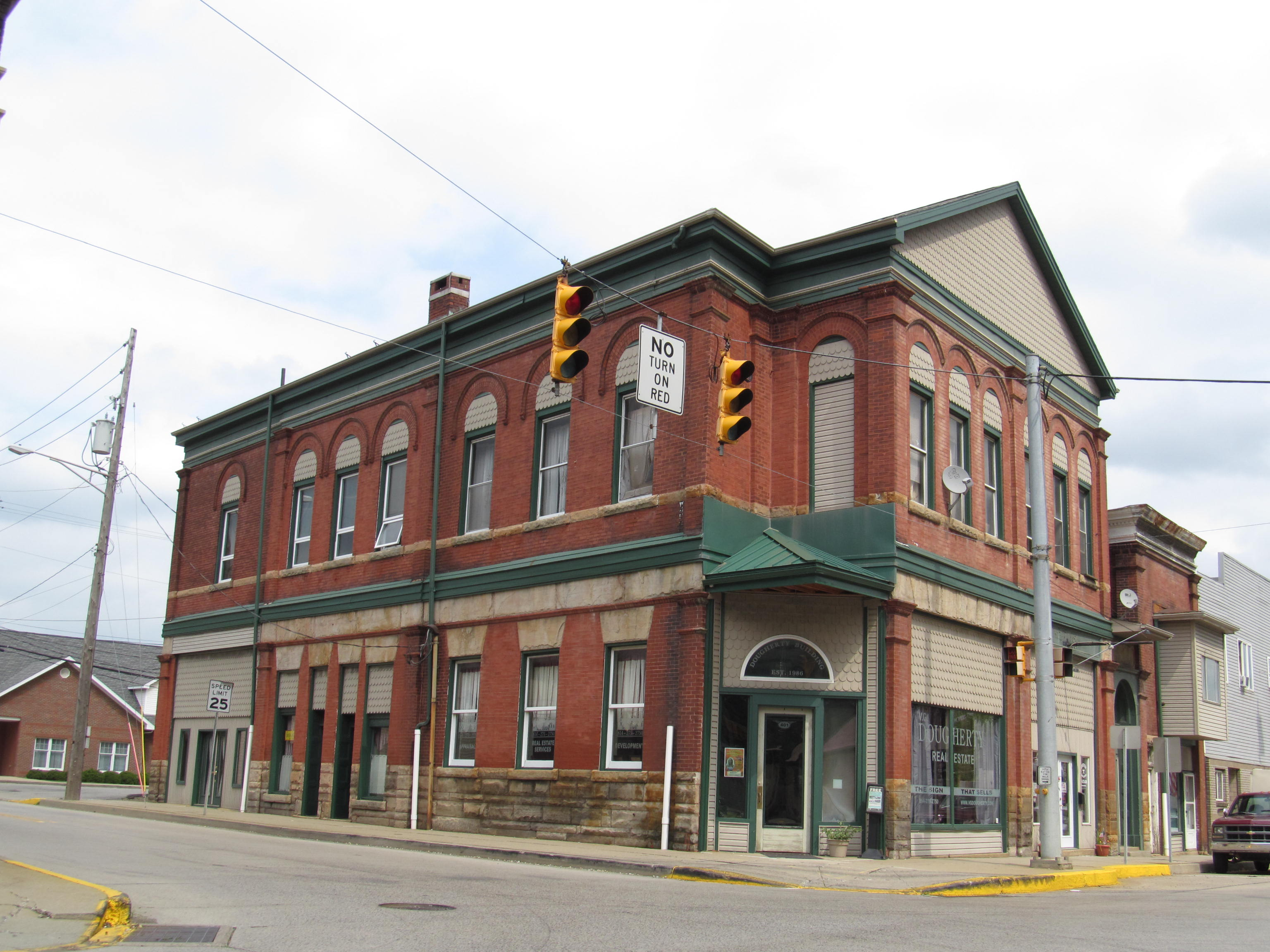
- Building at the intersection of Broad Street (PA Route 28) and Wood Street (PA Route 66) looking east in downtown New Bethlehem
- Nickname(s): Gumtown, Bethlehem, Peanut Town
- Location of New Bethlehem in Clarion County, Pennsylvania.

- Map showing Clarion County in Pennsylvania

- Location within Pennsylvania
- Coordinates: 41°00′12″N 79°19′51″W
- Country: United States
- State: Pennsylvania
- County: Clarion
- Settled: 1840
- Incorporated: 1853

Government
  - Type: Borough Council
  - Mayor: Gordon V. Barrows

Area
  - Total: 0.52 sq mi (1.34 km^{2})
  - Land: 0.47 sq mi (1.21 km^{2})
  - Water: 0.050 sq mi (0.13 km^{2})
- Elevation: 1,070 ft (330 m)

Population (2020)
  - Total: 978
  - Density: 2,097.7/sq mi (809.92/km^{2})
- Time zone: UTC-5 (Eastern (EST))
  - Summer (DST): UTC-4 (EDT)
- ZIP code: 16242
- FIPS code: 42-53248
- Website: www.newbethlehemboro.com

New Bethlehem (/nuːˈbɛθ.lʌm/ new-BETH-lum) is a borough in Clarion County, United States. The population was 979 at the 2020 census. The borough is situated at the southwestern corner of the Pennsylvania Wilds Conservation Landscape. Its main street, PA Route 28-66, is a major thoroughfare between the Pittsburgh metropolitan region and northcentral Pennsylvania. The designated tourism agency for Clarion County is Discover Clarion County

== Geography ==
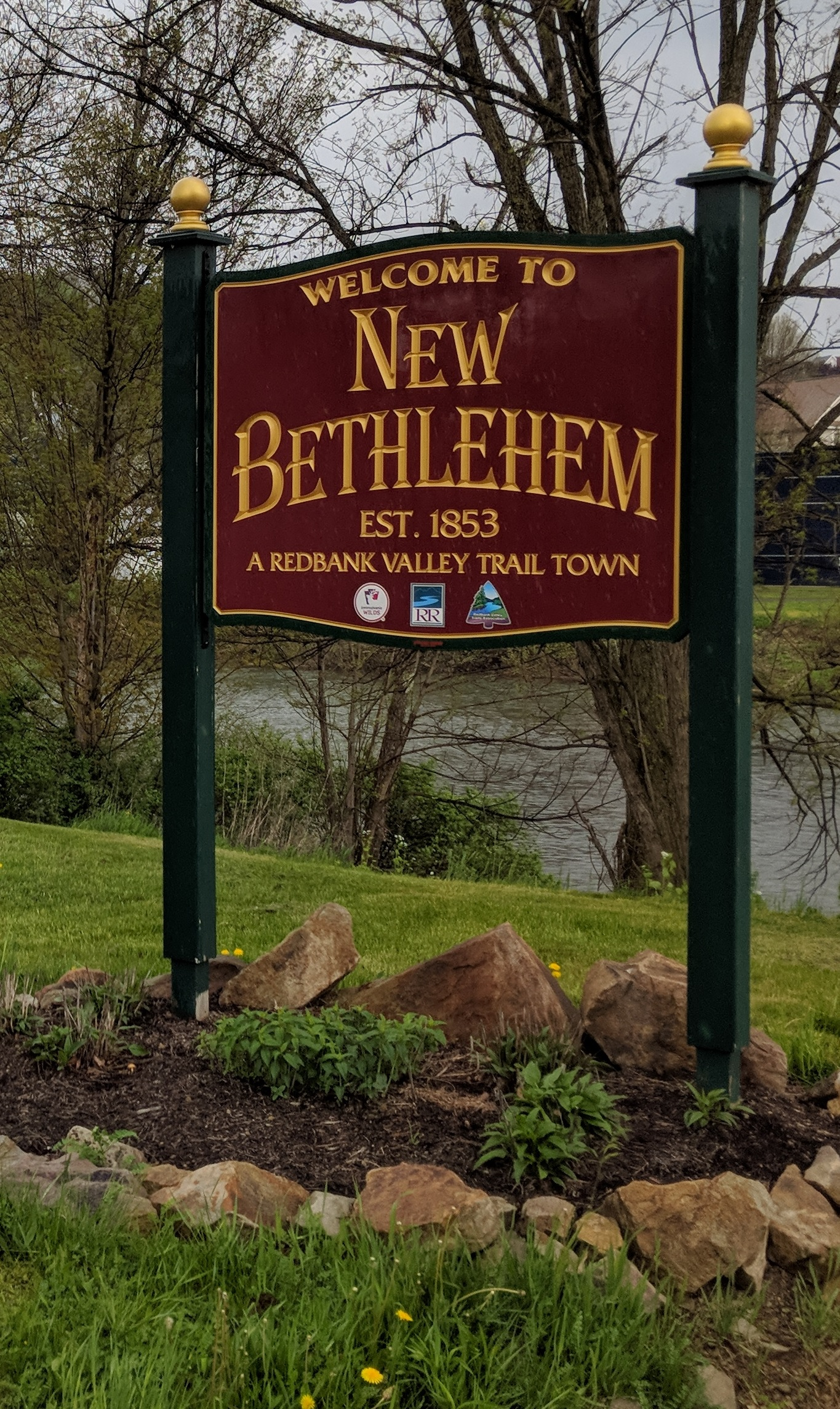
Sign welcoming visitors to New Bethlehem before crossing over the Redbank Creek from Armstrong County.

New Bethlehem is located along the southern border of Clarion County at 41°0′12″N 79°19′51″W (41.003302, -79.330935). It is in the valley of Redbank Creek, which separates the borough from South Bethlehem, Armstrong County to the south.

Pennsylvania Route 28 passes through the borough, crossing Redbank Creek into South Bethlehem, then leading southwest 20 miles (32 km) to Kittanning on the Allegheny River. To the northeast, PA 28 leads 20 miles (32 km) to Brookville and Interstate 80. Pennsylvania Route 66 intersects PA 28 in the center of New Bethlehem and leads north 13 miles (21 km) to I-80 and 16 miles (26 km) to Clarion, the county seat. PA 66 travels with PA 28 southwest to Kittanning. Pennsylvania Route 861 leads west from New Bethlehem 12 miles (19 km) to Rimersburg.

According to the United States Census Bureau, the borough of New Bethlehem has a total area of 0.50 square miles (1.3 km^{2}), of which 0.46 square miles (1.2 km^{2}) is land and 0.04 square miles (0.1 km^{2}), or 9.92%, is water.

== History ==
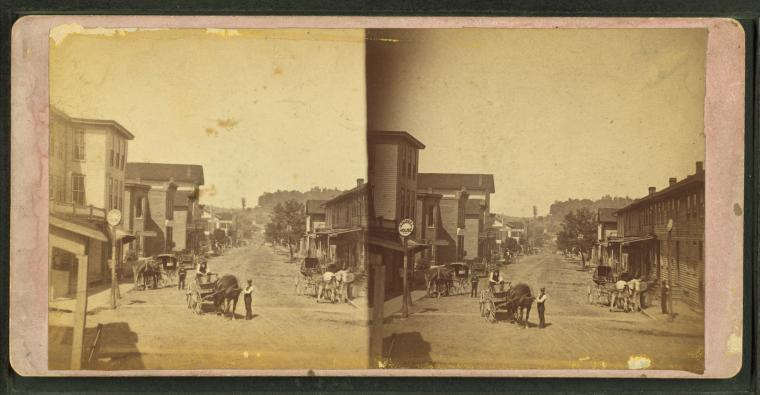
Main Street, New Bethlehem, Pennsylvania, by J. C. Barnes, c. 1870s

One of the prominent early settlers of the borough was Henry "Gum" Nolf (alternative spellings include Nulph), who built the first store, grist-, and saw-mill. The town was first referred to as "Gumtown" in honor of Nolf, but subsequently was named "Bethlehem", and later "New Bethlehem" to distinguish it from Bethlehem, Pennsylvania, in the eastern part of the state.

== Demographics ==
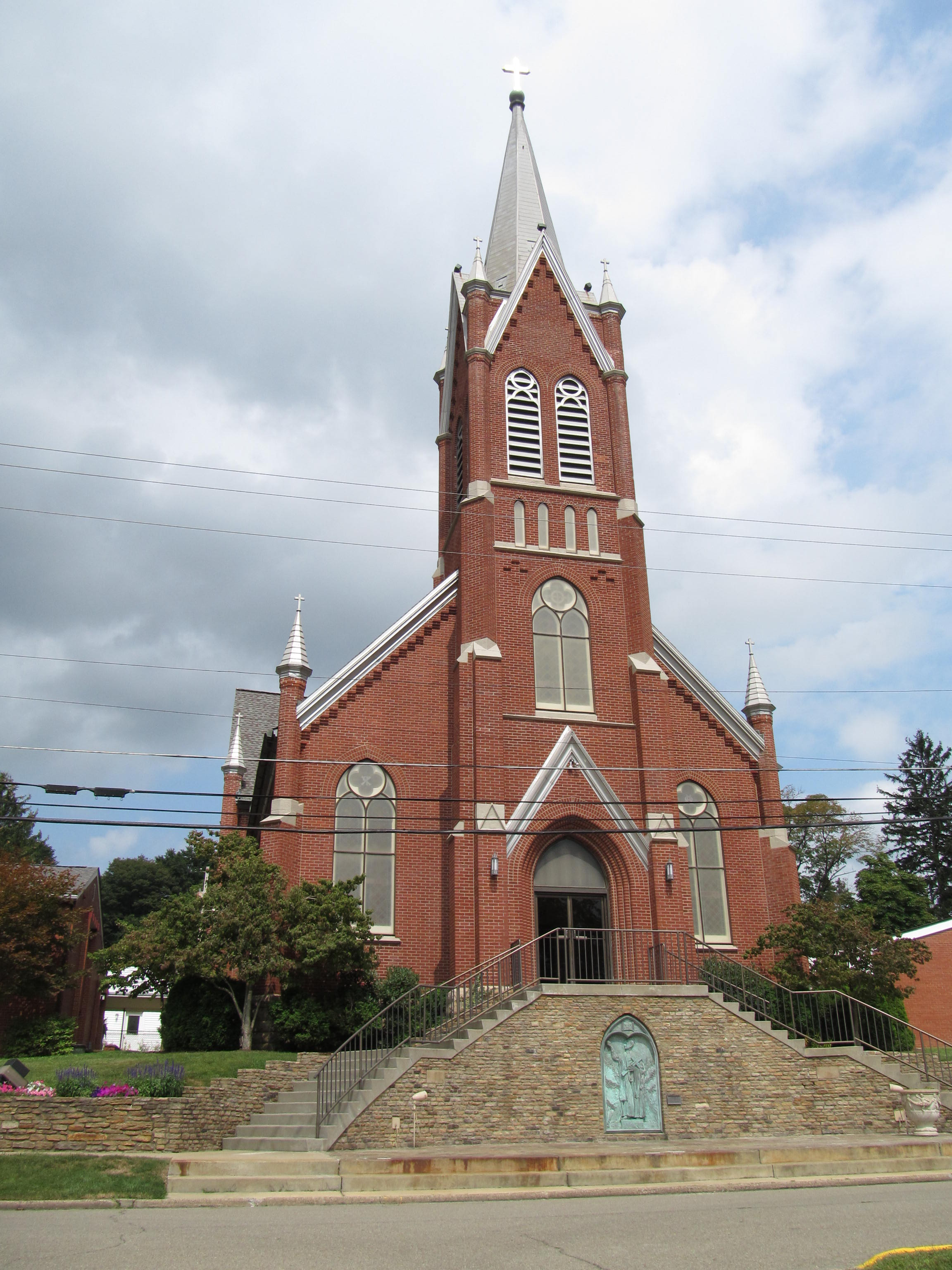
St. Charles Roman Catholic Church (201 Washington Street) built in 1872 and the third church to be built in the town

Historical population
Census	Pop.	Note	%±
1860	380		—
1870	348		−8.4%
1880	773		122.1%
1890	1,026		32.7%
1900	1,269		23.7%
1910	1,625		28.1%
1920	1,662		2.3%
1930	1,590		−4.3%
1940	1,622		2.0%
1950	1,604		−1.1%
1960	1,599		−0.3%
1970	1,406		−12.1%
1980	1,441		2.5%
1990	1,151		−20.1%
2000	1,057		−8.2%
2010	989		−6.4%
2020	978		−1.1%
2021 (est.)	975	▼	−0.3%

As of the census of 2000, there were 1,057 people, 489 households, and 274 families residing in the borough. The population density was 2,217.9 inhabitants per square mile (856.3/km^{2}). There were 575 housing units at an average density of 1,206.5 per square mile (465.8/km^{2}). The racial makeup of the borough was 98.49% White, 0.76% African American, 0.09% Native American, 0.09% Asian, 0.09% from other races, and 0.47% from two or more races. Hispanic or Latino of any race were 0.57% of the population.

There were 489 households, out of which 21.9% had children under the age of 18 living with them, 44.0% were married couples living together, 9.4% had a female householder with no husband present, and 43.8% were non-families. 40.1% of all households were made up of individuals, and 22.3% had someone living alone who was 65 years of age or older. The average household size was 2.08 and the average family size was 2.80.

In the borough the population was spread out, with 19.0% under the age of 18, 6.8% from 18 to 24, 24.2% from 25 to 44, 23.8% from 45 to 64, and 26.1% who were 65 years of age or older. The median age was 45 years. For every 100 females there were 81.0 males. For every 100 females age 18 and over, there were 75.4 males.

The median income for a household in the borough was $25,069, and the median income for a family was $38,750. Males had a median income of $30,750 versus $20,469 for females. The per capita income for the borough was $17,796. About 13.9% of families and 16.0% of the population were below the poverty line, including 20.0% of those under age 18 and 9.4% of those age 65 or over.

== Peanut Butter Festival ==
The city is home to an annual Peanut Butter Festival, celebrating its 30th year in 2025. Though the town is home to the Smucker's peanut butter factory, the company does not sponsor the festival. However, the company does provide peanut butter for sale by the case or jar in a variety of flavors including Honey and Peanut Butter and Chocolate and Peanut Butter. In recent years, J.M. Smucker has provided a $2,000 and $1,000 savings bond to the winner and first runner-up, respectively, of the Peanut Butter Festival Queen Scholarship competition. As of 2025, this competition still occurs annually. The Peanut Butter Festival is a Redbank Valley Chamber of Commerce-sponsored event and is mainly set in the Gumtown Park.

== Flood of 1996 ==
On July 19, 1996, a flood hit New Bethlehem as well as other parts of Pennsylvania. Reports state that the Redbank Creek was over seven feet above flood stage, and much of the downtown area was underwater. Redbank Valley High School was shut down. It took a few months to clean and fix the damage until students were allowed to attend again. On a garage east of the Redbank Valley High School there is a line that shows how high the water level was at its highest point.

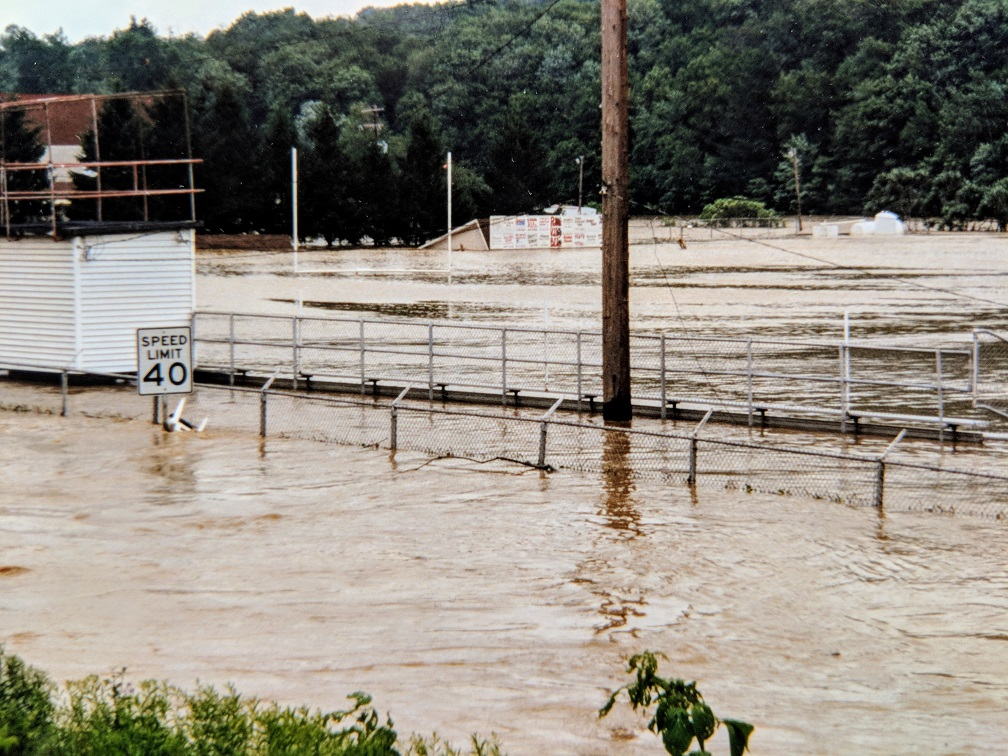
The football field at Redbank Valley Junior/Senior High School in July 1996 at 920 Broad St, New Bethlehem, PA. The announcer's booth can be seen at the left.

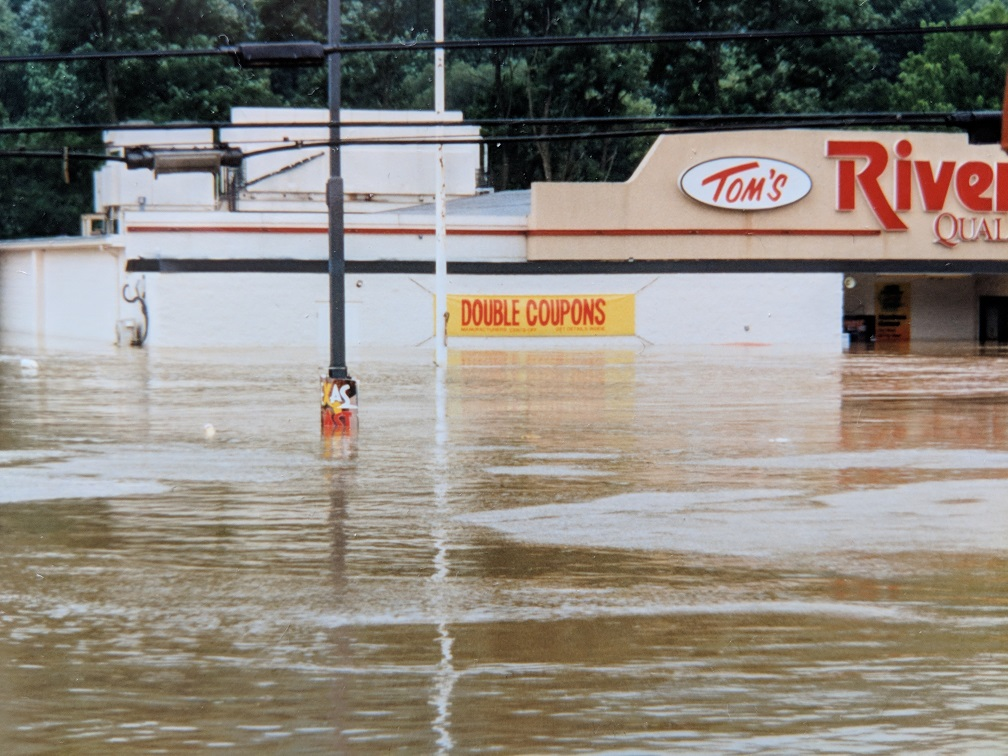
Tom's Riverside, a grocery store at 632 Broad Street, in New Bethlehem, PA, in July 1996 during the flooding.

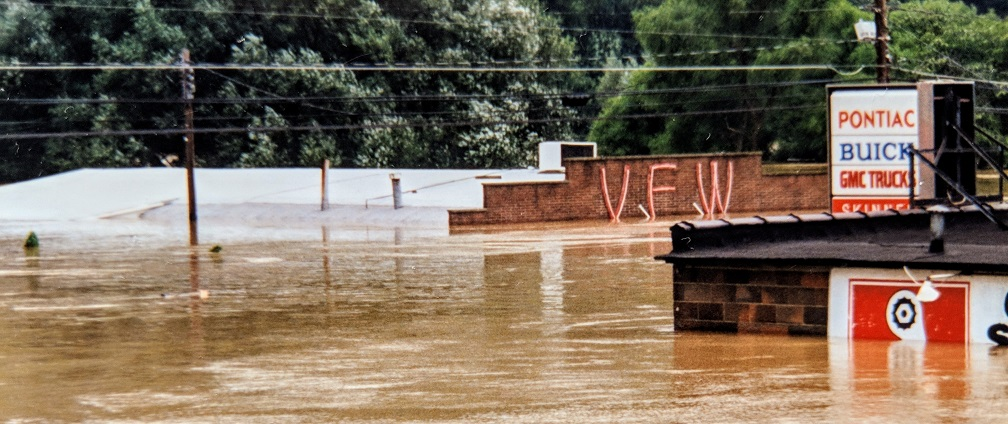
Flooding along east Broad Street in New Bethlehem, PA, in July 1996 showing the VFW Hall (526 Broad St, New Bethlehem, PA 16242) and automotive dealership and service garage.

== Redbank Valley Trail ==
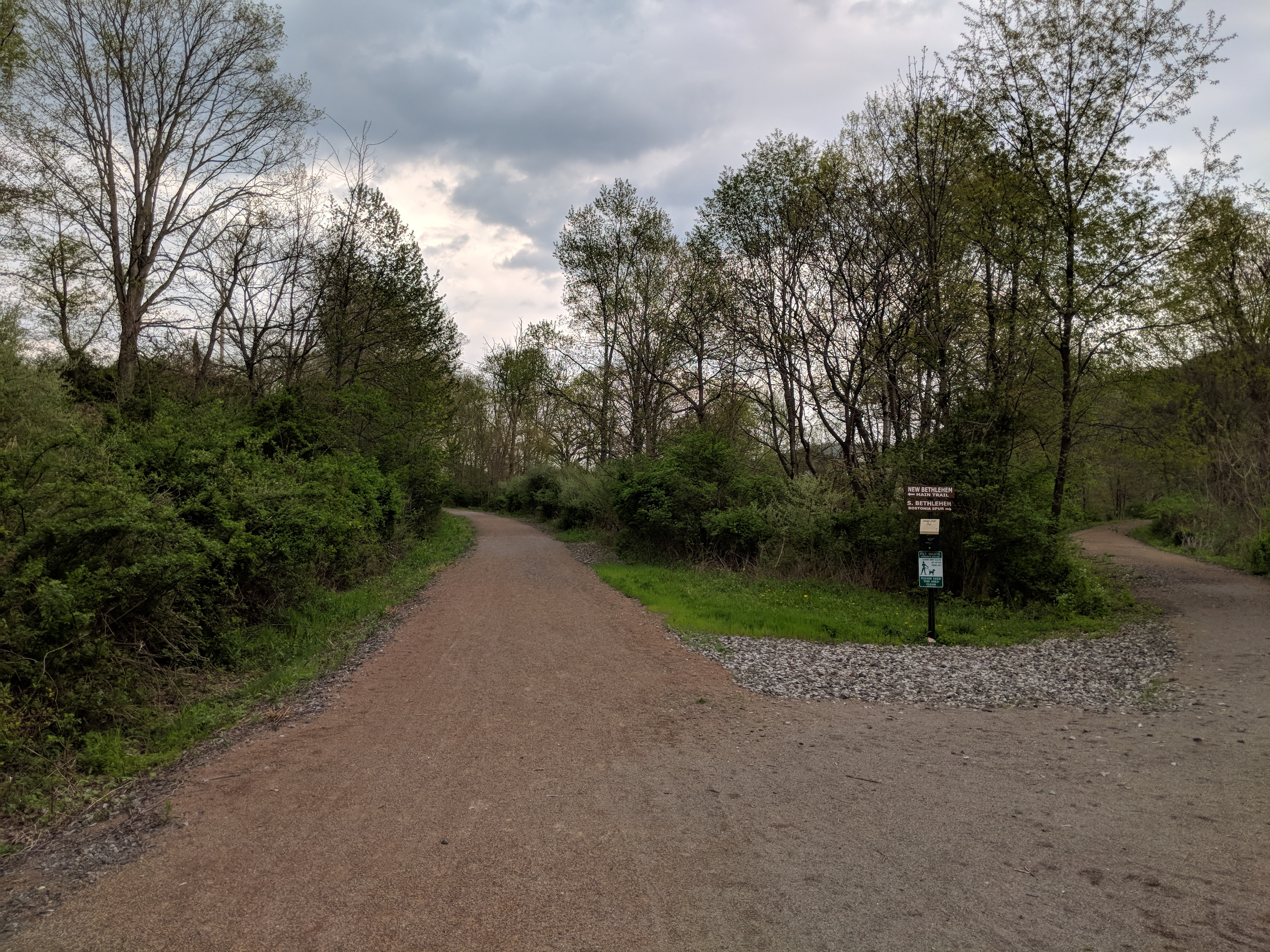
Redbank Trail at Bostonia Spur between mile markers 19 and 20 just outside New Bethlehem.

New Bethlehem is one of the towns through which the Redbank Valley Trail passes. The trail extends 41 miles from the Allegheny River, winding along the Redbank Creek to Brookville. The trail was chosen as Trail of the Year in 2014 by the Pennsylvania Department of Conservation and Natural Resources. The trail is built on a former rail corridor with the final train traveling through New Bethlehem on November 5, 2007, removing the tracks as it moved toward Brookville.

== Education ==
New Bethlehem is home to the Redbank Valley School District and two of the districts school buildings, its baseball fields and football and soccer fields. Redbank Valley Junior/Senior High School and Redbank Valley Primary School are both within borough limits.

The district's third school building, Redbank Valley Intermediate School, is located in Hawthorn, PA.

== Notable person ==
- Ossee Schreckengost - Baseball player, born in New Bethlehem (1875)
