= Redbank Valley School District =

School district in Pennsylvania

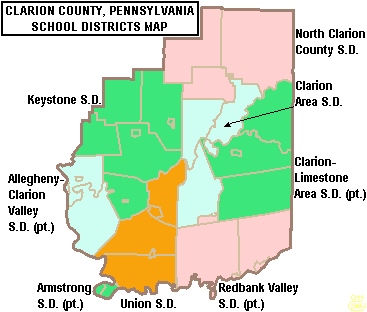

Address
- 920 Broad Street New Bethlehem, PA New Bethlehem, Pennsylvania, 16242; United States

Students and staff
- District mascot: Bulldog
- Colors: Red & White

Other information
- Website: http://www.redbankvalley.net/

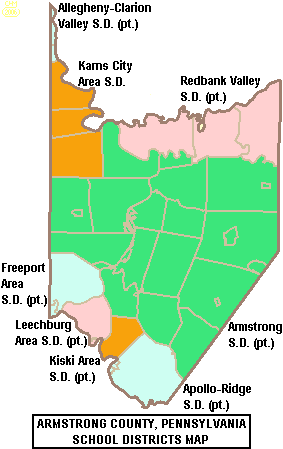
Redbank Valley School District region in Armstrong County

Redbank Valley School District (RVSD or Redbank) is a public school district in Western Pennsylvania. Spanning 165 square miles of the mountainous terrain of the Allegheny Plateau, the district rests on the southern boundary of the Pennsylvania Great Outdoors region. It is the largest district in its county by both population and land area. Redbank Valley athletes compete in the Keystone Shortway Athletic Conference as part of PIAA's District IX in eight of its nine programs. With the second largest auditorium and performing arts stage in Clarion County (second to that of Clarion University), the district hosts various school and community events throughout the year attracting thousands of attendees. The district's academics and student body have been frequently featured on national network news programs such as CBN's The 700 Club and ABC News Nightline. Other notable features include a large and active bible club, with nearly two-thirds of the student population attending throughout the year, and a state awarded chapter of Future Business Leaders of America. In addition, the school district is also the no. 23 employer in the county with over 100 employees, while maintaining the largest general budget expenditures and reserve fund of all county school districts.

== Area served ==
Redbank Valley School District is located primarily in Armstrong County, Pennsylvania with the district offices and all three schools located in Clarion County, Pennsylvania. It serves the borough of South Bethlehem and Redbank, Madison, and Mahoning Townships in Armstrong County, and the boroughs of New Bethlehem and Hawthorn and Redbank, and Porter Townships as well as a portion of Monroe Township in Clarion County. The district is part of the Riverview Intermediate Unit 6 region which serves approximately 20 school districts in north central Pennsylvania.

== Schools ==
Redbank Valley currently has three operational facilities. All built within 10 years of the district's founding, they have been renovated to meet capacity limits, as the class size has increased (and later decreased). These schools include both the repurposed elementary buildings, now the Redbank Valley Intermediate School (3-5) and the Redbank Valley Primary School (K-2). The third and largest of the schools is the Redbank Valley Junior/Senior High School, that combines grades 6-12.

=== Elementary schools ===
School name	Grades	School Address	Built	Renovated
Redbank Valley Primary School	K-2	600 Vine St. New Bethlehem, PA 16242	1962	1988
Redbank Valley Intermediate School	3-5	1306 Truittsburg Rd; Hawthorn, PA 16230	1960	1990

=== Junior/senior high school ===
School name	Grades	School Address	Built	Renovated
Redbank Valley Junior/Senior High School	6-12	920 Broad St. New Bethlehem, PA 16242	1957	1987, 1996, 2008

=== Defunct schools ===
School name	Grades	School Address	Built	Renovated	Closed
Mahoning Township Elementary School	K-6	330 Pheasant Farm Rd. New Bethlehem, PA 16242	1959	1990	2011
Madison Township Elementary School	K-6	1155 Madison Rd. Templeton, PA 16259	1959		1986
Porter Township Elementary School	K-6		1935		1988

== Extracurricular ==
=== Programs and activities ===
As of the 2017/2018 school year, RVSD offers the following extracurricular activities and programs.

==== Athletics ====
Baseball, Basketball, Cheerleading, Football, Soccer, Softball, Track and Field, Volleyball, Wrestling

==== Clubs ====
Bible Club, Future Business Leaders of America, Future Farmers of America, Journalism Club, Jazz Band, Marching Band, Outdoor Club, Ski Club, Student Council, Broadcast Journalism, Show Choir, SPARK Club - Chapter of The Smile Project, AV Club, Robotics (FIRST, BEST, VEX)
