= Riddle High School =

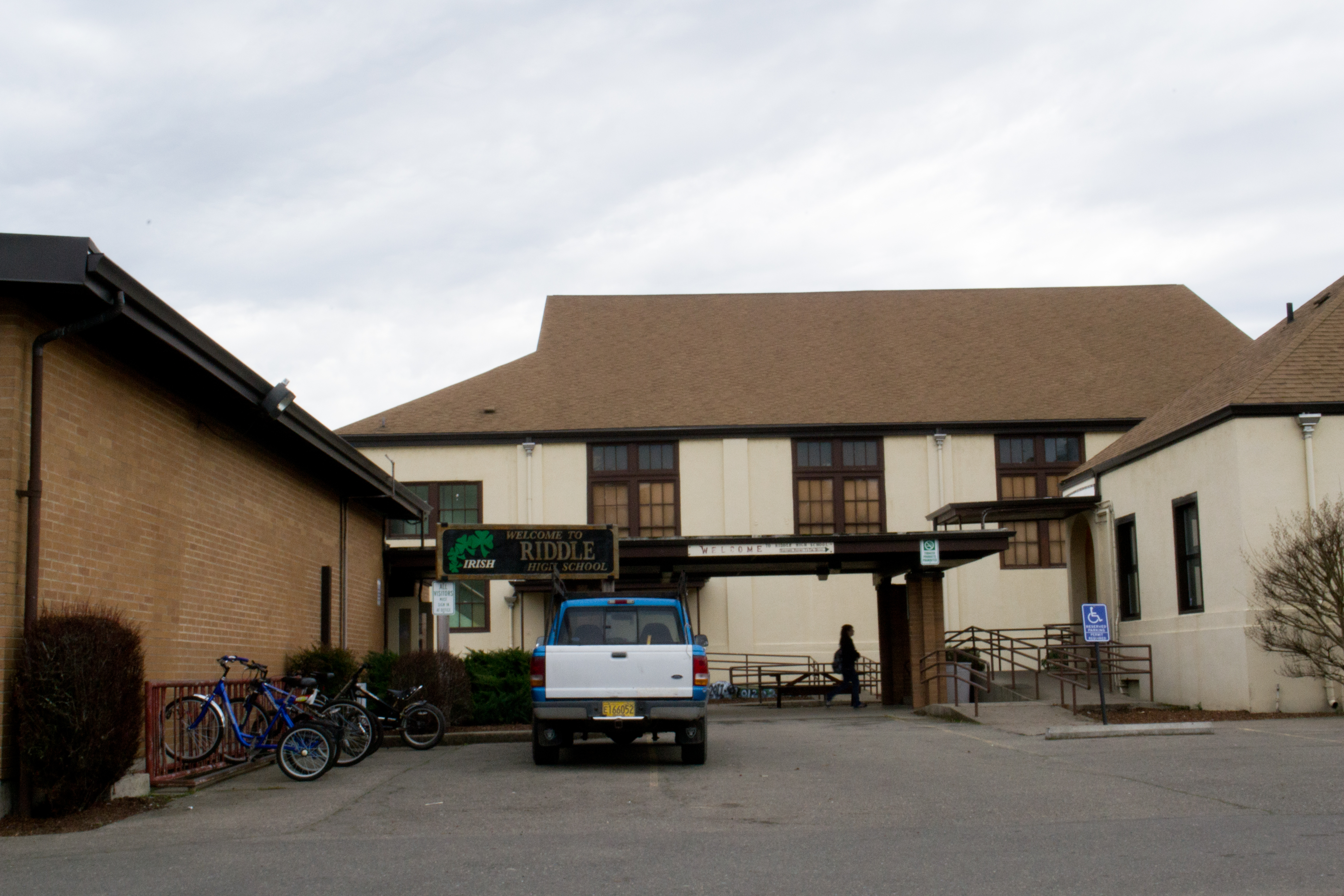

Location
- 147 S Main Street; Riddle, Douglas County, Oregon 97469; United States; 42.949045°N 123.363687°W

Information
- Type: Public
- Established: c. 1935
- School district: Riddle School District
- Principal: Russell Hobson
- Staff: 15.37 (FTE)
- Grades: 7-12
- Enrollment: 174 (2023–2024)
- Student to teacher ratio: 11.32
- Colors: Black, white, and Kelly green
- Athletics conference: OSAA Mountain View Conference 2A-2
- Mascot: Irish
- Rival: Camas Valley Charter School
- Website: Riddle HS website

Riddle High School, also known as Riddle Junior/Senior High School, is a public high school established in 1935 in Riddle, Oregon, United States. It is a part of Riddle School District and houses students from the 7th to 12th Grade.

== Academics ==
In 2008, 83% of the school's seniors received their high school diploma. Of 35 students, 29 graduated, 5 withdrew, and 1 continued in high school.
