= Valley Vista High School =

Valley Vista High School may refer to:

- Valley Vista High School (Arizona), Surprise, Arizona
- Valley Vista High School (California), Fountain Valley, California
