= Valley Lutheran High School =

Valley Lutheran High School may refer to:

- Valley Lutheran High School (Arizona), Phoenix, Arizona
- Valley Lutheran High School (Michigan), Saginaw, Michigan
