= Camas Valley Charter School =

Location
- 197 Main Camas Road; Camas Valley, (Douglas County), Oregon 97416; United States; 43.03448°N 123.675043°W

Information
- Type: Public
- School district: Camas Valley School District
- Principal: Don Wonsley
- Grades: K-12
- Enrollment: 139
- Colors: Black and gold
- Athletics conference: OSAA Skyline League 1A-4
- Mascot: Hornet
- Rival: Riddle High School
- Website: www.camasvalley.k12.or.us/
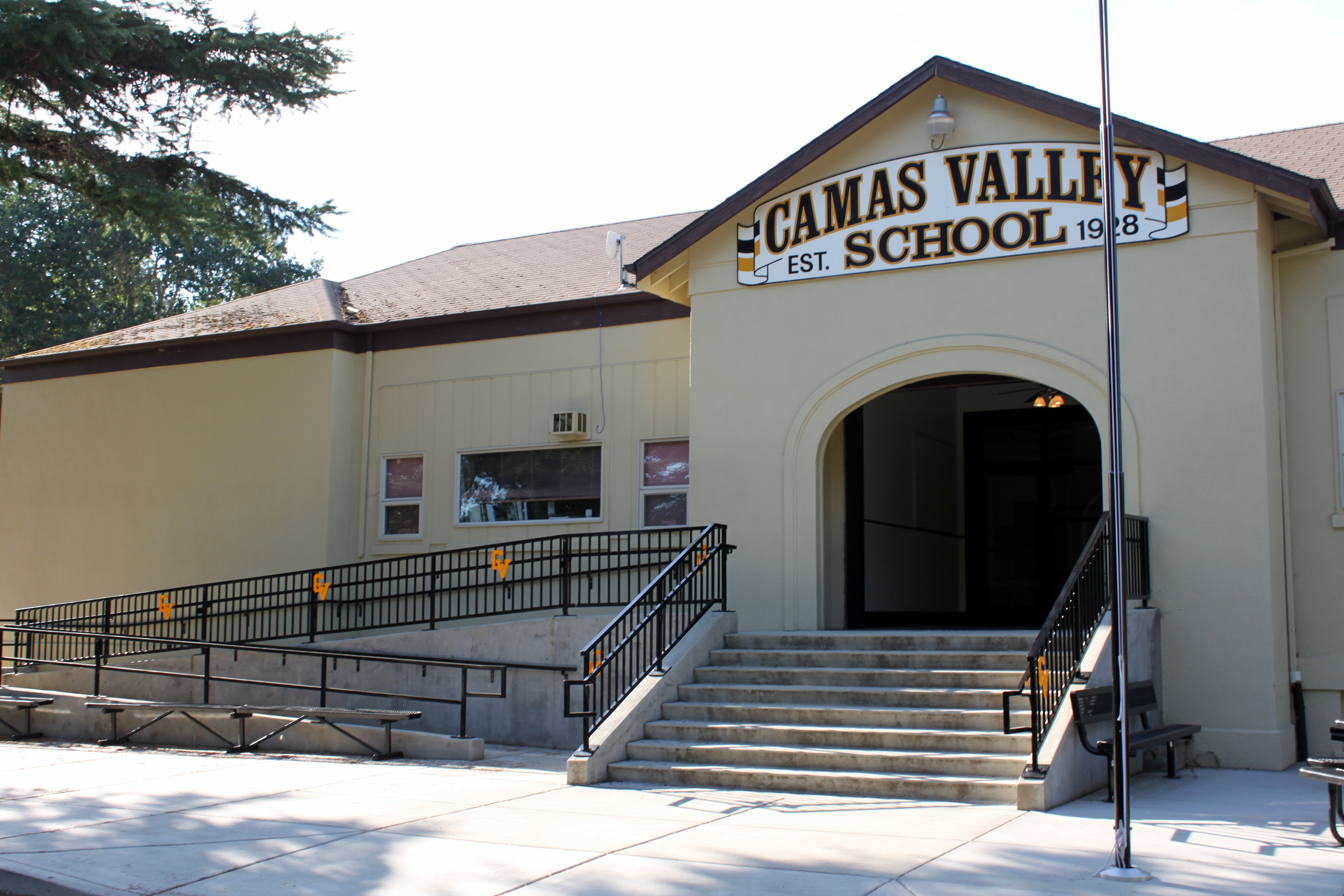

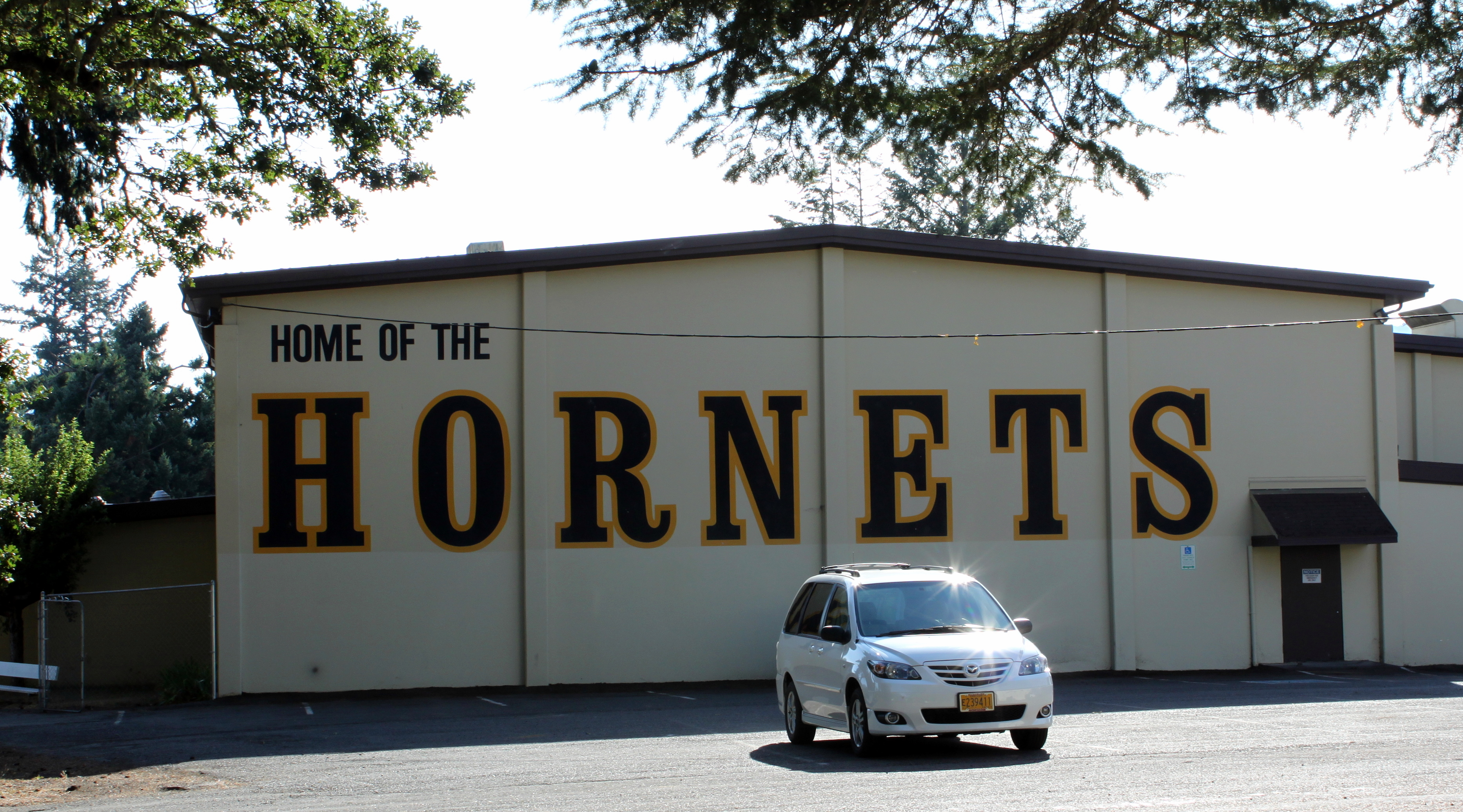

Camas Valley Charter School is a public charter school in Camas Valley, Oregon, United States. It is the only school in the Camas Valley School District.

It became a charter school in 2004.

== Academics ==
In 2008, 82% of the school's seniors received a high school diploma. Of 11 students, nine graduated, one dropped out, and one was still in high school in 2009.
