= Georgetown Independent School District =

School district in Texas, United States

Address
- 507 East University Avenue Georgetown, Texas, 78626; United States

District information
- Schools: 21
- NCES District ID: 4820600

Students and staff
- Students: 13,472
- Teachers: 986.33 (on an FTE basis)
- Student–teacher ratio: 13.66:1

Georgetown Independent School District is a public school district based in Georgetown, Texas (USA). The district, covering 180.3 square miles, had 13,155 students as of 2023.

In addition to Georgetown, the district serves the city of Weir and the communities of Serenada and Walburg.

In 2019, the school district received an accountability rating of "B" from the Texas Education Agency.

== Georgetown ISD School Board ==
A Board of Trustees oversees Georgetown ISD. There are seven seats on this board, and they choose the Superintendent. The current superintendent is Dr. Devin Padavil.

== Schools ==
Georgetown ISD has 3 high schools, 4 middle schools, 11 elementary schools, and 4 alternate campuses.

=== High schools ===
==== Grades 9–12 ====
- East View High School
- Georgetown High School
- #3 Unnamed Future High School

=== Middle schools ===
==== Grades 6-8 ====
- Douglas Benold Middle School II
- Charles A Forbes Middle School
- James Tippit Middle School
- George Wagner Middle School
- #5 Unnamed future Middle School (opening in the 2027-2028 school year)

=== Elementary schools ===
==== Grades PK-5 ====
- Jessie Daniel Ames Elementary School (opening in 2027-2028 school year)
- George Washington Carver Elementary School II
- Patricia Webb Cooper Elementary School
- Jo Ann Ford Elementary School
- Jack Frost Elementary School II
- San Gabriel Elementary School
- Raye McCoy Elementary School II
- James E Mitchell Elementary School
- Anne Purl Elementary School II
- Village Elementary School
- Everette L. Williams Elementary School II
- Wolf Ranch Elementary School

=== Alternative Campuses ===
- Richarte High School: An academic alternative school for Grades 10–12.
- Georgetown Alternative Program (GAP): GAP is the Discipline Alternative Education Program for Grades 6–12.
- Successful Transition Education Program (S.T.E.P.): S.T.E.P. is an alternative education campus (Grades 4–12) for juvenile justice-involved youth and students expelled by the school district. It is operated with Williamson County Juvenile Services.

== Georgetown ISD Athletic Complex ==
The district opened a brand-new athletic complex in 2008, including a multipurpose stadium that seats approximately 12,500. The field, named for former GHS football coach Bernard Birklebach, is Field Turf artificial turf. The complex already includes softball and baseball fields, tennis courts, and a separate track facility.
