= West Valley High School =

West Valley High School can refer to:

- West Valley High School (Alaska), College, Alaska (Fairbanks postal address)
- West Valley High School (Cottonwood, California), Cottonwood, California
- West Valley High School (Hemet, California), Hemet, California
- West Valley High School (Spokane, Washington), Spokane, Washington
- West Valley High School (Yakima, Washington), Yakima, Washington
