= VCHS =

VCHS may refer to:

Valley Christian High School:

- Valley Christian High School (Arizona), Chandler, Arizona
- Valley Christian High School (Cerritos, California), Cerritos, California
- Valley Christian High School (Dublin, California), Dublin, California
- Valley Christian High School (San Jose, California), San Jose, California
- Valley Christian High School (Montana), Missoula, Montana
- Valley Christian High School (Texas), Brownsville, Texas
- Valley Christian High School (Wisconsin), Oshkosh, Wisconsin
- Valley Christian Schools (Ohio), Youngstown, Ohio
- Valley Christian Heritage School, in Alamo, Texas
