= East Valley High School =

East Valley High School may refer to:

- East Valley High School (Spokane, Washington), Spokane, Washington
- East Valley High School (Yakima, Washington), Yakima, Washington
- East Valley High School (California), Los Angeles, California
- Redlands East Valley High School, Redlands, California
