= Redbank Valley Junior/Senior High School =

Redbank Valley Jr./Sr. High School

Location
- 920 Broad St. New Bethlehem, Pennsylvania 16242
- Coordinates: 41°0′15″N 79°19′5″W

Information
- School type: Public Junior/Senior High School
- Established: 1950
- School district: Redbank Valley
- Principal: Roddy Hartle
- Teaching staff: 37.39 (FTE)
- Grades: 6-12
- Student to teacher ratio: 14.68
- Colors: Red and White
- Athletics conference: PIAA District IX
- Mascot: Bulldogs

Redbank Valley Junior/Senior High School is a public high school, located in New Bethlehem, Pennsylvania. There are about 580 students and 38 faculty members. The school serves students in southern Clarion County and northern Armstrong County.

For more information, or for those wishing to view the district page, please go to the Redbank Valley School District page.

== School history ==
The Redbank Valley School opened its doors for the first time for the start of the 1957-58 school term. For two years prior to the school's opening, the students were educated at the local Fire Hall, an automotive garage, and other facilities in the community of New Bethlehem. The school was renovated during the summer of 1996, at which time, the nearby Redbank Creek overflowed its banks, causing moderate damage to the school. The school was featured on ABC's Nightline during the presidential election of 2016. It was again featured on ABC's Nightline after the first 100 days of the Trump presidency.

== Graduation requirements ==
Students at Redbank must complete 25 credits of coursework, which included the state-mandiated Graduation Project and score sufficiently on the PSSA's.

=== Credit structure ===
Subject Area	#/Credits	Notes
English	4.0	
Social Studies	4.0	
Science	3.5	Starting with the class of 2014, a 0.5 credit course in Ecology must be taken either during Freshman or Sophomore Year.
Math	4.0	
Health	0.5	Taken during Junior Year
Physical Education	2.0	0.5 credit each year
Google Suite	0.5	Taken Freshman Year
Arts/Humanities	1.0	
Electives	3.25-5.0	Students must have an average of seven class periods scheduled each year,
TOTAL	25.0	

=== Clarion County Career Center ===
Students in Grades 10-12 who wish to pursue a vocational trade can attend Clarion County Career Center if they wish to do so part-time.

== Athletics ==
Redbank Valley participates in PIAA District IX (9).

Sport Name	Boys	Girls
Baseball / Softball	Class A	Class AA
Basketball	Class AA	Class AA
Football	Class A	
Soccer	Class A	Class A
Track and Field	Class AA	Class AA
Volleyball		Class A
Wrestling	Class AA	
