= River Valley High School (disambiguation) =

River Valley High School is a high school in Singapore.

River Valley High School may also refer to:

- River Valley High School, Mohave Valley, Arizona
- River Valley High School, Yuba City, California
- River Valley High School, Correctionville, Iowa (see River Valley Community School District)
- River Valley High School, Three Oaks, Michigan
- River Valley High School, Caledonia, Ohio
- River Valley High School, Bidwell, Ohio
- River Valley High School, a high school in Wisconsin

== See also ==
- River Valley Charter School, Lakeside, California
