= East View High School (Georgetown, Texas) =

Public high school in Texas, US

East View

Location
- 4490 East University Avenue; Georgetown, Texas 78626-7877; United States
- 30.642494°N 97.618718°W

Information
- School type: Public high school
- Established: 2008
- School district: Georgetown Independent School District
- Principal: Alfonso R. Longoria
- Staff: 140
- Grades: 9-12
- Enrollment: 2,321 (2025–2026)
- Student to teacher ratio: 15.37
- Language: English / Spanish
- Hours in school day: 7
- Colors: Red, navy, and white
- Athletics conference: UIL Class 6A
- Mascot: Patriots
- Website: East View High School

East View High School (EVHS) is a UIL 6A (as of 2026) public high school located in Georgetown, Texas, United States. It is part of the Georgetown Independent School District located in central Williamson County. EVHS is a comprehensive high school. Home of the Patriots, East View High School opened in The Fall of 2008 as the GISD 9th Grade Campus which was recognized by the Texas Education Agency three years in a row. For the 2024-2025 school year, the school received an overall rating of "C" from the Texas Education Agency.

== Notable alumni ==
- Levi Drake Rodriguez, NFL defensive end Minnesota Vikings
