= Valley View High School =

Valley View High School may refer to

- Valley View High School (Arkansas), Jonesboro, Arkansas
- Valley View High School (Moreno Valley, California), Moreno Valley, California
- Valley View High School (Ontario, California), Ontario, California
- Valley View High School (Ohio), Germantown, Ohio
- Valley View High School (Pennsylvania), Archbald, Pennsylvania
- Valley View High School (Valley View, Texas), Valley View, Texas
