= Valley Lutheran High School (Phoenix, Arizona) =

Location
- 5199 N. 7th Ave; Phoenix, Arizona 85013; 33°30′46.62″N 112°4′56.82″W

Information
- School type: Private
- Religious affiliation: Lutheran
- Established: 1981
- Principal: Lisa Coleman - Interim 2026/2027
- Enrollment: 190 students (October 1, 2010)
- Colors: Red and gray
- Mascot: Flames
- Website: www.vlhs.org

Valley Lutheran High School is a private Lutheran high school (grades 9–12) in Phoenix, Arizona, United States. It opened in 1981. It is associated with the Lutheran Church – Missouri Synod.

A new gym was built and opened around May 2007. A new academic building was built in 2017.

== Sports ==
The school offers several men's and women's sports teams, including:

- Baseball: 2A
- Basketball – Boys': 1A
- Basketball – Girls': 1A
- Cross Country – Boys': Division IV, Section I
- Cross Country – Girls': Division IV, Section IV
- Football: 2A
- Golf - Division III
- Soccer – Boys' (W): 3A Region 8
- Softball: 2A
- Spiritline: Division III
- Tennis – Boys': Division III, Section V
- Tennis – Girls': Division III, Section V
- Track – Boys': Division IV
- Track – Girls': Division V
- Volleyball – Girls': 1A
- Wrestling: Division IV, Section I
