= Valley Vista High School (California) =

Coordinates: 33°42′29″N 117°57′40″W

Location
- 9600 Dolphin St; Fountain Valley, California; United States

Information
- Type: Continuation school
- Established: 1 January 1989
- School district: Huntington Beach Union High School District
- Principal: Daniel Morris
- Grades: 9–12
- Enrollment: 269 (2023–2024)
- Language: English
- Website: www.vvhs.info

Valley Vista High School is a continuation school in Fountain Valley, California, USA. It is part of the Huntington Beach Union High School District in Orange County.

The school teaches grades 9–12, and has a maximum enrollment of 300 students. The school has one teacher for (approximately) every sixteen students. The school offers support to students who are non-native English speakers, as well as disabled students. There is also an adult education class offering a GED.

The school offers programs in The Arts, Computer Science and vocational courses in Health and Physical Education.

The school has typically performed below the School District and State averages in CST (California Standards Tests) results.
