= Redlands school =

Redlands school may refer to:

- Redlands College, an independent co-educational school in Brisbane, Australia
- Redlands, Cremorne, an independent co-educational school in Sydney, Australia
- Redlands East Valley High School, a public high school in Redlands, California
- Redlands High School, a public high school in Redlands, California

== See also ==
- Redlands Unified School District
