= Cope Middle School =

Cope Middle School is the name of two schools in the United States:

- Cope Middle School (Louisiana), in Bossier City
- Cope Middle School, in Redlands Unified School District, Redlands, California
