= Gary Walker (defensive back) =

American football player (born 1991)

Profile
- Position: Safety

Personal information
- Born: May 10, 1991 (age 35); Rialto, California, U.S.
- Listed height: 6 ft 0 in (1.83 m)
- Listed weight: 199 lb (90 kg)

Career information
- High school: Redlands East Valley (Redlands, California)
- College: Idaho (2009–2012)
- NFL draft: 2013: undrafted

Career history
- Baltimore Ravens (2013)*
- * Offseason or practice squad member only

Awards and highlights
- First-team All-WAC (2012)

Gary Walker Jr. (born May 10, 1991) is an American former football safety. He was signed by the Baltimore Ravens as an undrafted free agent in 2013. He played college football for the University of Idaho.

== Professional career ==
=== Baltimore Ravens ===
On May 8, 2013, he signed with the Baltimore Ravens as an undrafted free agent. On August 13, 2013, he was cut by the Ravens.
