= Kylie Fitts =

American football player (born 1994)

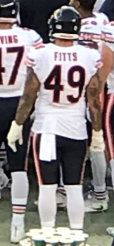
- Fitts with the Chicago Bears in 2018

No. 49
- Position: Linebacker

Personal information
- Born: October 11, 1994 (age 32); San Bernardino, California, U.S.
- Listed height: 6 ft 4 in (1.93 m)
- Listed weight: 260 lb (118 kg)

Career information
- High school: Redlands East Valley (Redlands, California)
- College: Utah
- NFL draft: 2018: 6th round, 181st overall pick

Career history
- Chicago Bears (2018); Arizona Cardinals (2019–2021)

Career NFL statistics
- Total tackles: 15
- Forced fumbles: 1
- Stats at Pro Football Reference

Kylie Roy Fitts (born October 11, 1994) is an American former professional football player who was a linebacker for four seasons in the National Football League (NFL). He played college football for the Utah Utes. He was selected by the Chicago Bears in the sixth round of the 2018 NFL draft and spent his last three seasons with the Arizona Cardinals.

== Early life ==
Fitts attended Redlands East Valley High School in Redlands, California, where he was a 4 star recruit. Fitts originally signed with UCLA, but transferred to Utah after one year with the program. After redshirting for a year, Fitts played in all 13 games during his sophomore year. Fitts injured his foot during the second game of his junior year against BYU, and was declared out for the year. Fitts continued to deal with injuries during his senior year, but recorded 3 sacks and 23 tackles during his senior year. He was also invited to the 2018 Senior Bowl.

== Professional career ==
Pre-draft measurables
Height	Weight	Arm length	Hand span	40-yard dash	10-yard split	20-yard split	20-yard shuttle	Three-cone drill	Vertical jump	Broad jump	Bench press
6 ft 4 3/4 in (1.95 m)	263 lb (119 kg)	33 in (0.84 m)	9 1/2 in (0.24 m)	4.69 s	1.61 s	2.72 s	4.19 s	6.88 s	32.5 in (0.83 m)	9 ft 9 in (2.97 m)	31 reps
All values from NFL Combine

=== Chicago Bears ===
Fitts was selected by the Chicago Bears in the sixth round (181st overall) in the 2018 NFL draft. He was released on August 31, 2019.

=== Arizona Cardinals ===
On September 3, 2019, Fitts was signed to the practice squad of the Arizona Cardinals. He was promoted to the active roster on December 4, 2019. On December 28, 2020, Fitts was placed on injured reserve.

The Cardinals placed an exclusive-rights free agent tender on Fitts on March 15, 2021. He signed the one-year contract on April 15. He was waived on August 31, 2021 and re-signed to the practice squad the next day. He was promoted to the active roster on September 11, 2021. He was placed on injured reserve on October 22, 2021. He became an unrestricted free agent in 2022.

On April 15, 2022, Fitts announced his retirement from professional football citing multiple concussions as the main reason.
