= Redlands Unified School District =

School district in California

Location
- Redlands, California San Bernardino County United States

District information
- Grades: K through 12
- Established: 1905
- Superintendent: Juan Cabral
- Enrollment: 19,773

Other information
- Website: www.redlandsusd.net

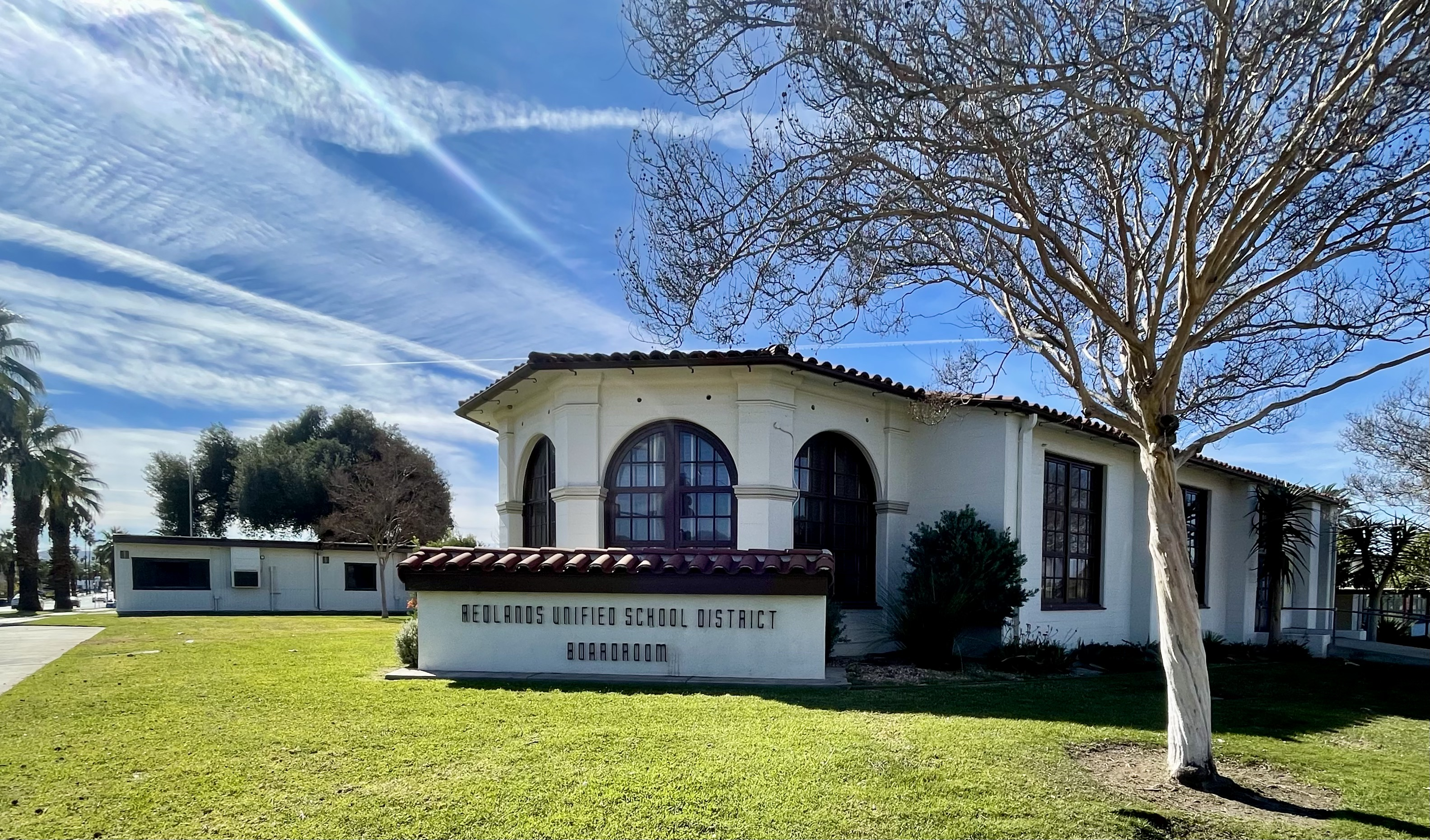
Redlands Unified School District historic 1937 Boardroom.

The Redlands Unified School District is a public school district in San Bernardino County, California. It includes the city of Redlands, and the majority of the city of Loma Linda, the unincorporated communities of Mentone, Crafton, and Forest Falls, as well as the eastern half of Highland and a small eastern portion of San Bernardino.

Total enrollment was 19,773 in 2024. The district has 16 elementary schools that serve kindergarten through fifth grade, four middle schools serving sixth through eighth grades. The district has three four-year high schools, one alternative high school and one charter high school.

== District governance ==
- Superintendent – Juan Cabral (since July 1, 2023).

=== Board of education ===
As of May 2026:

- President – Michele Rendler - (Trustee Area 2) (first elected in 2019, term ends in 2026)
- Vice President – Patty S. Holohan - (Trustee Area 1) (first elected in 2008, term ends in 2026)
- Board Clerk – Melissa Ayala-Quintero - (Trustee Area 3) (first elected in 2020, term ends in 2026)
- Member – Jeannette Wilson - (Trustee Area 4) (first elected in 2024, term ends in 2028)
- Member – Candy Olson - (Trustee Area 5) (first elected in September 2024, term ends in 2028)

Board members are elected to serve four year terms with no term limits.

== History ==
=== Early school houses ===
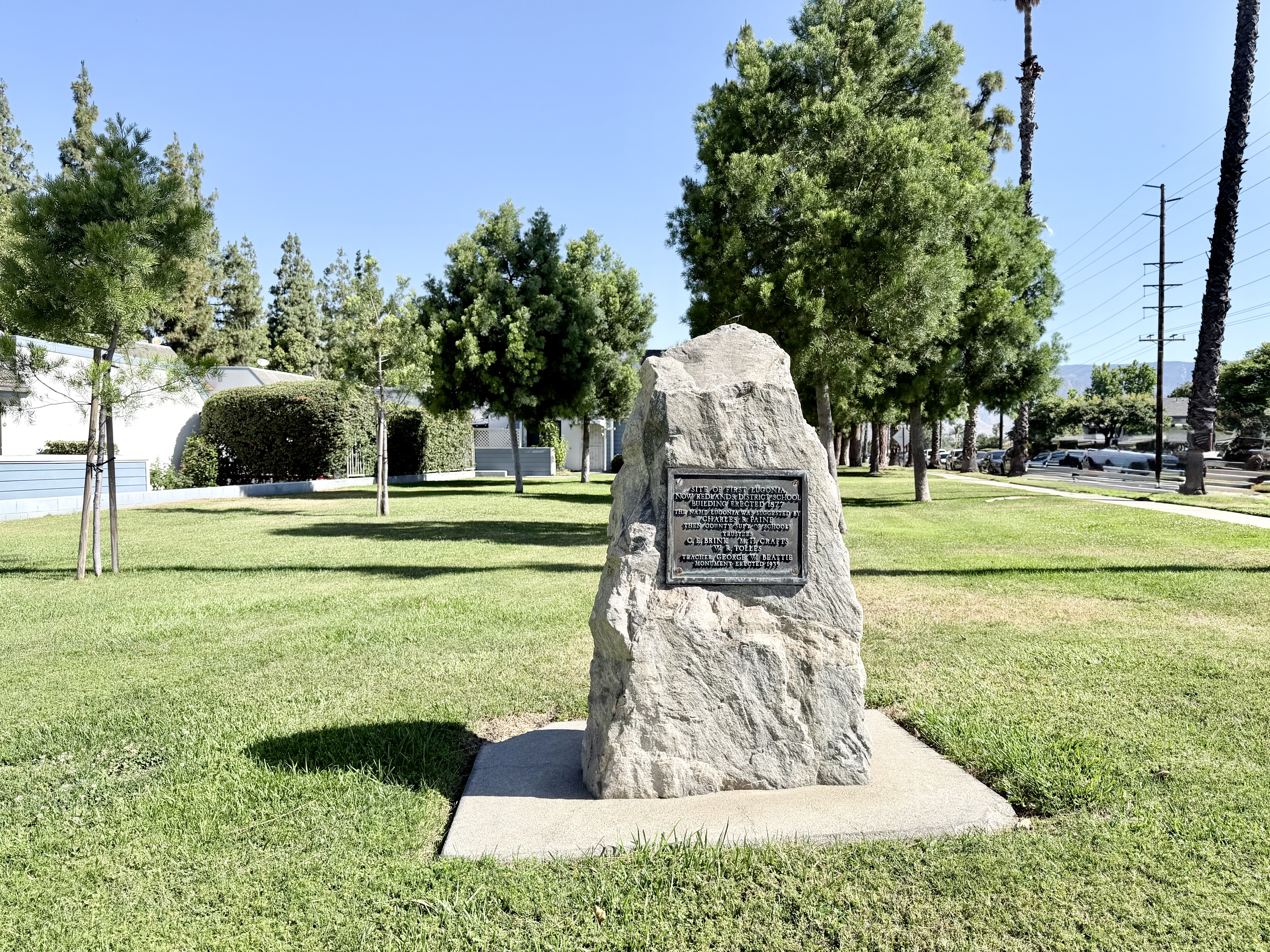
1935 monument erected at the original 1877 Lugonia School site, Church Street / Lugonia Avenue by Daughters of the American Revolution

Early history of education in what is now Redlands was established by the local Estancia outpost of the San Gabriel Mission by Spanish missionaries in 1820. The Mission School taught local native tribes about agriculture, religion and Eurocentrism. The Van Leuven school, a private school was established in 1854 near the Estancia in the western area of now Redlands. The Mission School District was established in 1857 and opened a public school named - Mission Elementary, using the old Van Leuven school house. Across the valley, in Lugonia townsite, Lugonia Elementary was founded in October 1877 by Frank E. Brown and George W. Beattie on the northwest corner of Lugonia Avenue and Church Street, now northern Redlands, establishing the Lugonia School District. Crafton Elementary was established in 1888 and created the Crafton School District in the eastern area of now Redlands. The Barton School House was built in 1901 by Dr. Ben Barton, the new land owner of the Estancia. Redlands was incorporated as a city in 1888.

=== Consolidation ===
One high school was established by the districts in 1891, "Union High School". Union High School was originally on the northwest corner of Orange Street and Colton Avenue in a building called, the "Wilson-Berry Building". The Redlands Unified School District (RUSD) was organized and founded in 1905, created from the already established Lugonia, Mission and Crafton School Districts. Union High School became Redlands High School in 1892 and moved into its current campus on Citrus Avenue. It has remained in the same location since opening day, the only high school in California still operating on its original site.

=== District Growth ===
Lugonia Elementary was named after the Lugo family of California, early settlers of Redlands before incorporation. Kingsbury Elementary opened in 1888 and in 1892, teacher Mrs. Mary Fackler started the tradition of reciting the American Pledge of Allegiance at the start of each school day. The custom faded and she helped re-start the spread of the recital nationwide. McKinley Elementary was built in 1903, it is named after the 25th President of the United States, William McKinley, the first sitting U.S. president to visit Redlands in 1901. Lowell school was built in 1902 on Church and Citrus Avenue. Franklin Elementary in 1903 for Benjamin Franklin. Bryn Mawr Elementary opened in 1911 in the Loma Linda area. Bryn Mawr is welsh for "big hill". The Barton School House closed in 1937. Kimberly Elementary was founded in 1957, and named after resident Mary Kimberly Shirk, owner of the Kimberly Crest mansion, daughter of the founder of Kleenex. Smiley Elementary was named after Redlands philanthropists, the Smiley brothers Albert K. and Alfred Smiley, opened in 1953.

In 1921, the first Junior High school was the re-purposed Lowell Elementary, adjacent Redlands High School on Citrus Avenue. E. M. Cope Middle School, founded in 1957, is named after Edward Mitchell Cope, local business owner and founder of the Redlands chapter of the Red Cross, who also donated land to build the local Community Hospital. Clement Middle School opened in the fall of 1962. It's named after former Redlands educator and early Redlands Superintendent Henry G. Clement. Moore Middle School opened as Moore Junior high school in the fall of 1966, named after the Moore family, owners of the local Daily Facts newspaper from 1895 to 1981. The Redlands Junior High School site closed in 1966 and its classrooms were added to Redlands High School and re-named "north campus". Beattie Middle School opened in 2004, named after the first teacher at Lugonia Elementary school, University of Redlands alumni, founding faculty at the University of the Philippines in Manila and Pomona College and dean of Manila Junior College, Superintendent of San Bernardino County schools and local Redlands historian, George W. Beattie.

Redlands had a Lincoln Elementary School, opened July 1, 1980. The elementary school closed in 1989. The campus became Orangewood (Continuation) High School. The continuation school was previously operating out of the district offices since 1966. Orangewood is the districts only continuation high school. Clement Middle school once functioned as Redlands High School's "Freshman Campus", between 1994 and 1997 due to overcrowding at the school districts only high school, RHS. RUSD would go on to build two additional high schools, Redlands East Valley High School in 1997 and Redlands Citrus Valley High School in 2009. Clement returned to its original name with middle school students once REVHS opened. Judson & Brown Elementary was also named after Redlands founders Edward G. Judson and Frank E. Brown, opened in 2006.

The Redlands eAcademy is a RUSD on-line school. The school features a blended learning environment and serves grades K-12. The virtual school opened in August 2013.

=== Bonds ===
Prior to Proposition 13, RUSD relied heavily on property taxes assessed. With property taxes capped, school districts had to rely on state funds. Contemporary bonds started with measure M in 1993, but notable historical facility bonds approved by Redlands voters prior to 1993 include the 1884 bond of US $6,000 (equivalent to US $180,813.08 in 2025) to build Lugonia Elementary, the 1877/1878 bond of US $15,000 (equivalent to US $417,861.77 in 2025), approved to build the first Kingsbury Elementary School campus and the 1903 bond of US $60,000 (equivalent to US $1.72 million in 2025), passed to expand Redlands High School and complete its campus construction; as examples.

Contemporary bonds as of 1993 are:

- Measure M in 1993: Funded the removal of old portable classrooms and modernization of libraries and labs.
- Measure T in 1993: US $34.5 million (equivalent to US $680.4 million in 2025) for a new high school that eventually became REVHS.
- Measure R in 2002: US $60 million (equivalent to US $102.5 million in 2025) seismic retrofitting and permanent building replacements. Funds for a third high school, eventually building CVHS.
- Measure J in 2008: US $65.5 million (equivalent to US $111.9 million in 2025) to answer overcrowding and updating structural spaces.
- Measure D in 2024: $500 million to update campuses due to age, as more than 80% are over 60 years old.

== Elementary schools ==
Mission Elementary School
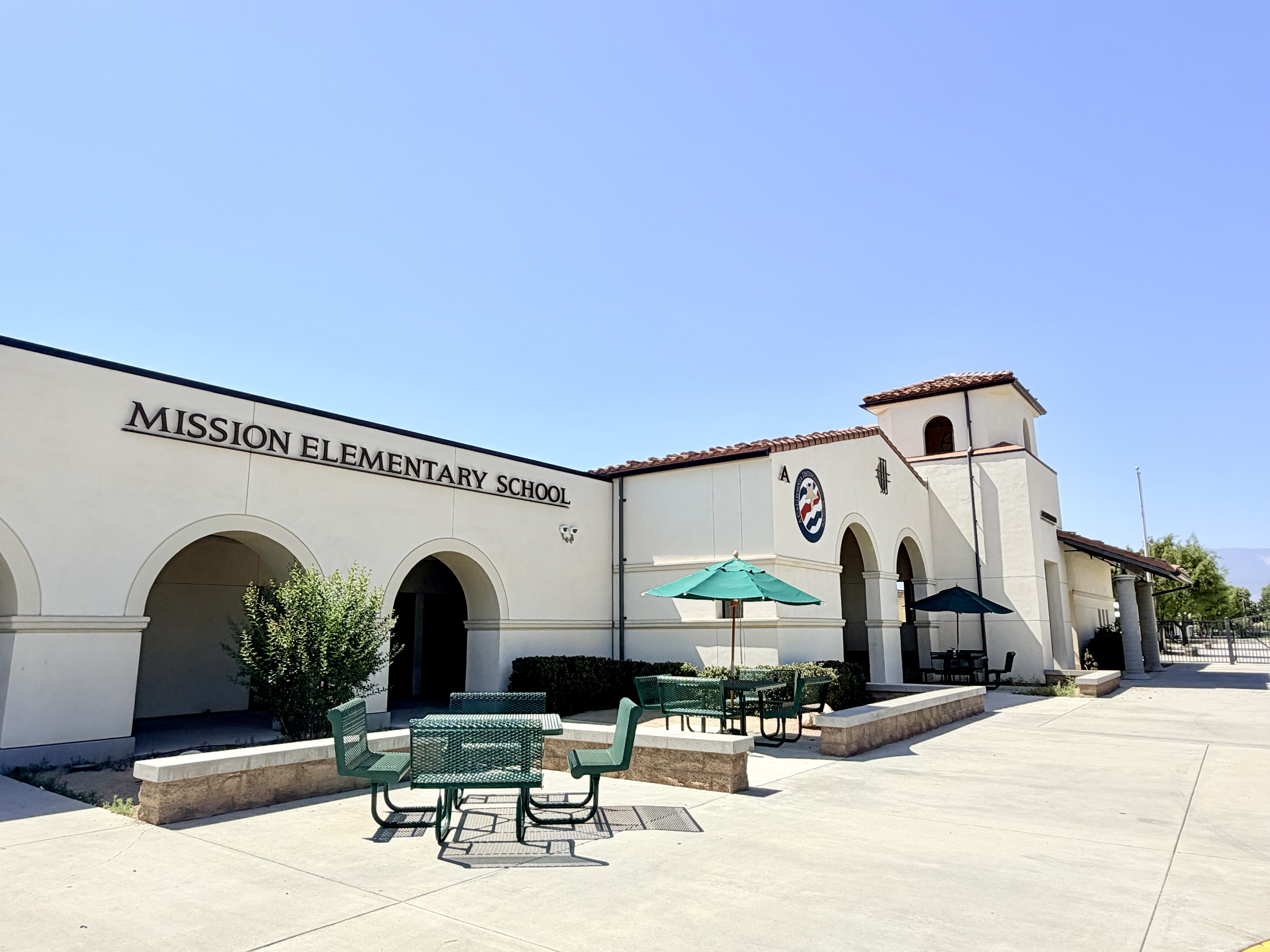

Location
- 10568 California Street; Redlands, California 92373

Information
- Type: Public (U.S.)
- Founded: 1820; 206 years ago (closed 1994 thru 2010)
- Principal: Dr. Mollee O'Day
- Grades: Pre-kindergarten through 5th
- Campus: suburban
- Color: Green
- Team name: Mustangs
- Website: mission.redlandsusd.net

Kingsbury Elementary School
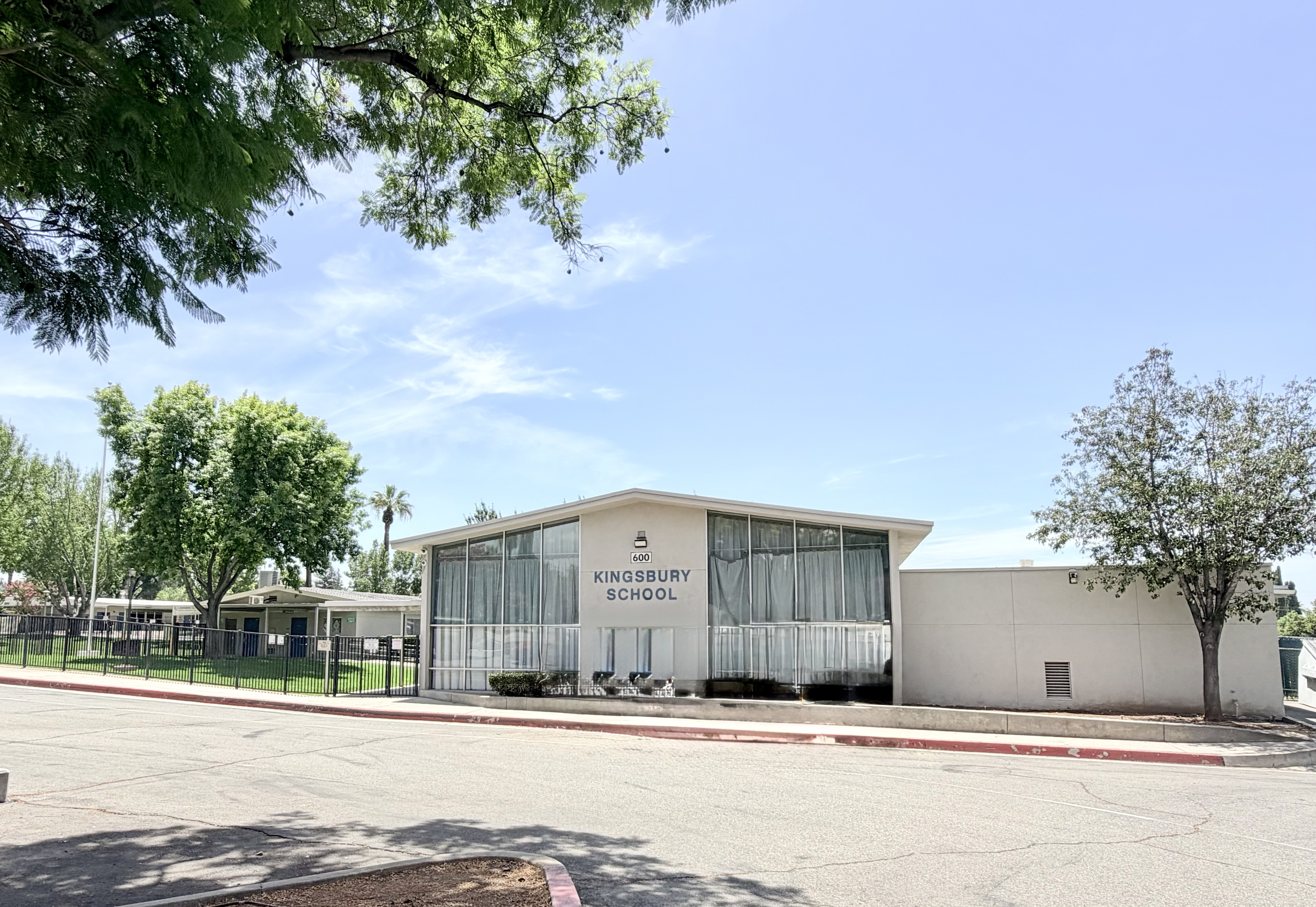

Location
- 600 Cajon Street; Redlands, California 92373

Information
- Type: Public (U.S.)
- Founded: September 17, 1888; 138 years ago
- Principal: Jeff Wray
- Grades: Pre-kindergarten through 5th
- Campus: suburban
- Colors: Blue and White
- Team name: Bears
- Website: kingsbury.redlandsusd.net

McKinley Elementary School
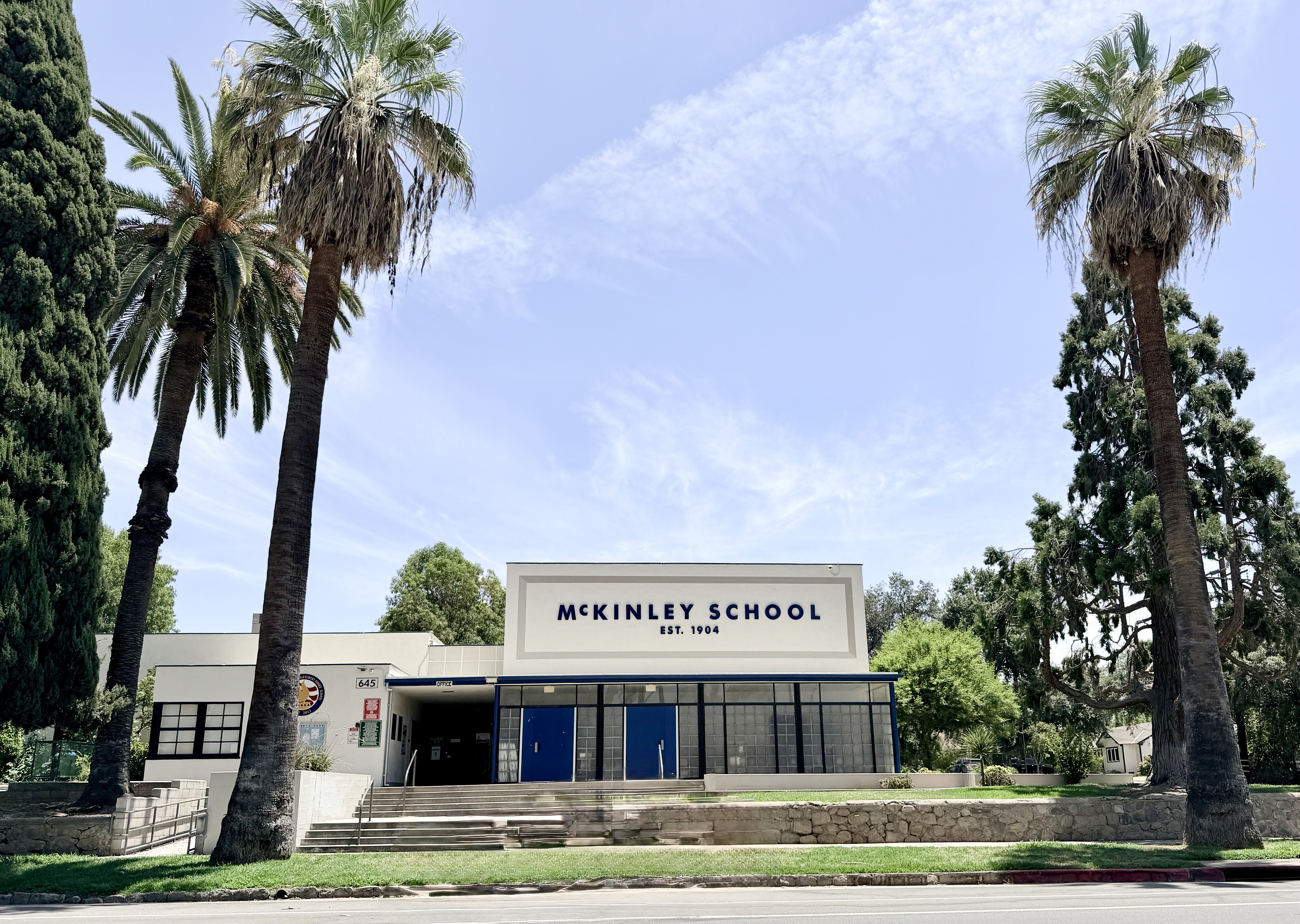

Location
- 645 West Olive Avenue; Redlands, California 92373

Information
- Type: Public (U.S.)
- Founded: 1904; 122 years ago
- Principal: Minerva Castorena
- Grades: Pre-kindergarten through 5th
- Enrollment: 415
- Campus: suburban
- Colors: Blue and White
- Team name: The Bears
- Website: mckinley.redlandsusd.net

Smiley Elementary School
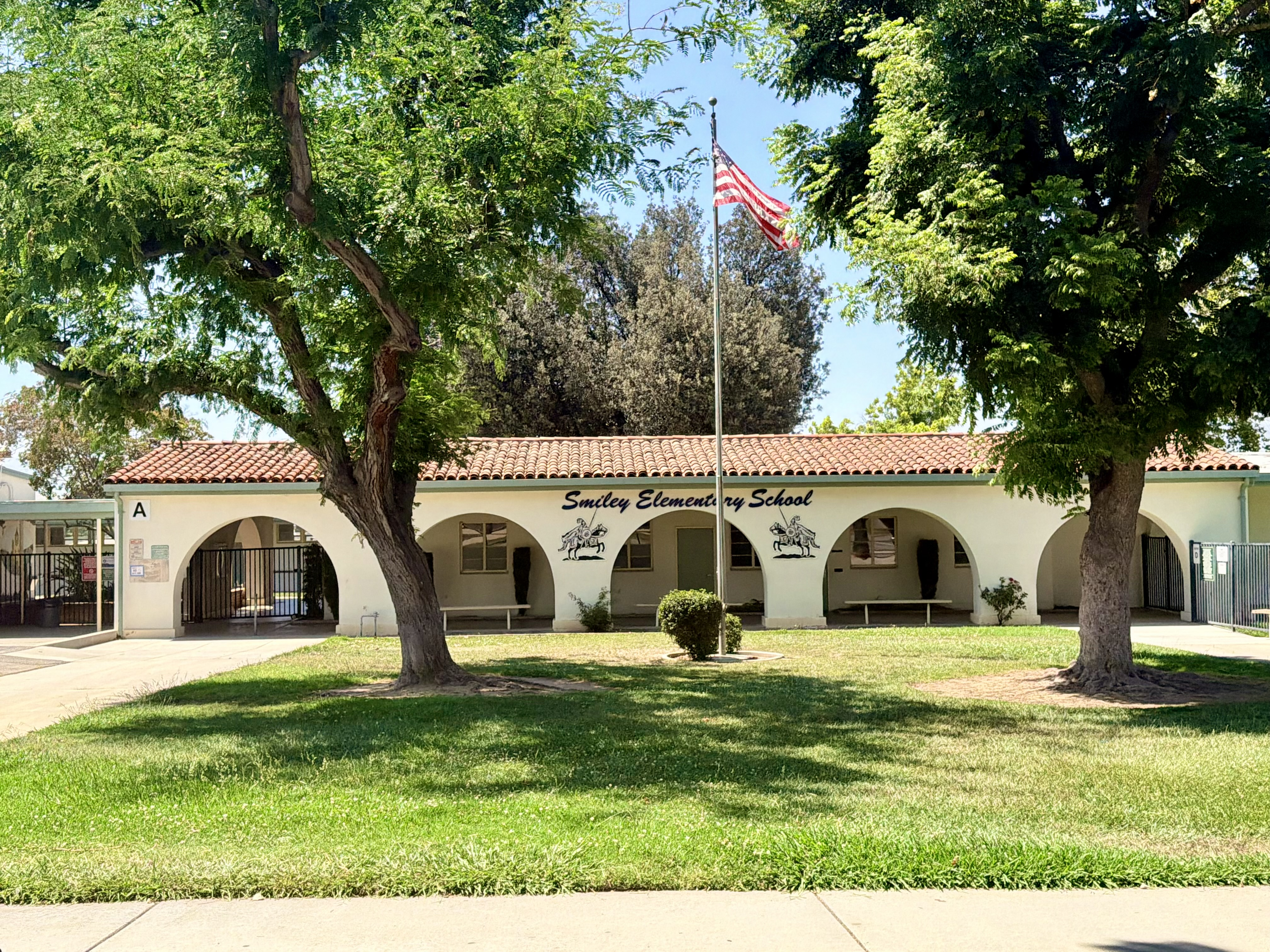

Location
- 1210 W. Cypress Ave. Redlands, California 92373

Information
- Type: Public (U.S.)
- Founded: 1938; 88 years ago
- Principal: Danita Slaughter
- Grades: Pre-kindergarten through 5th
- Campus: suburban
- Colors: Blue And silver
- Team name: Knights
- Website: smiley.redlandsusd.net

Kimberly Elementary School
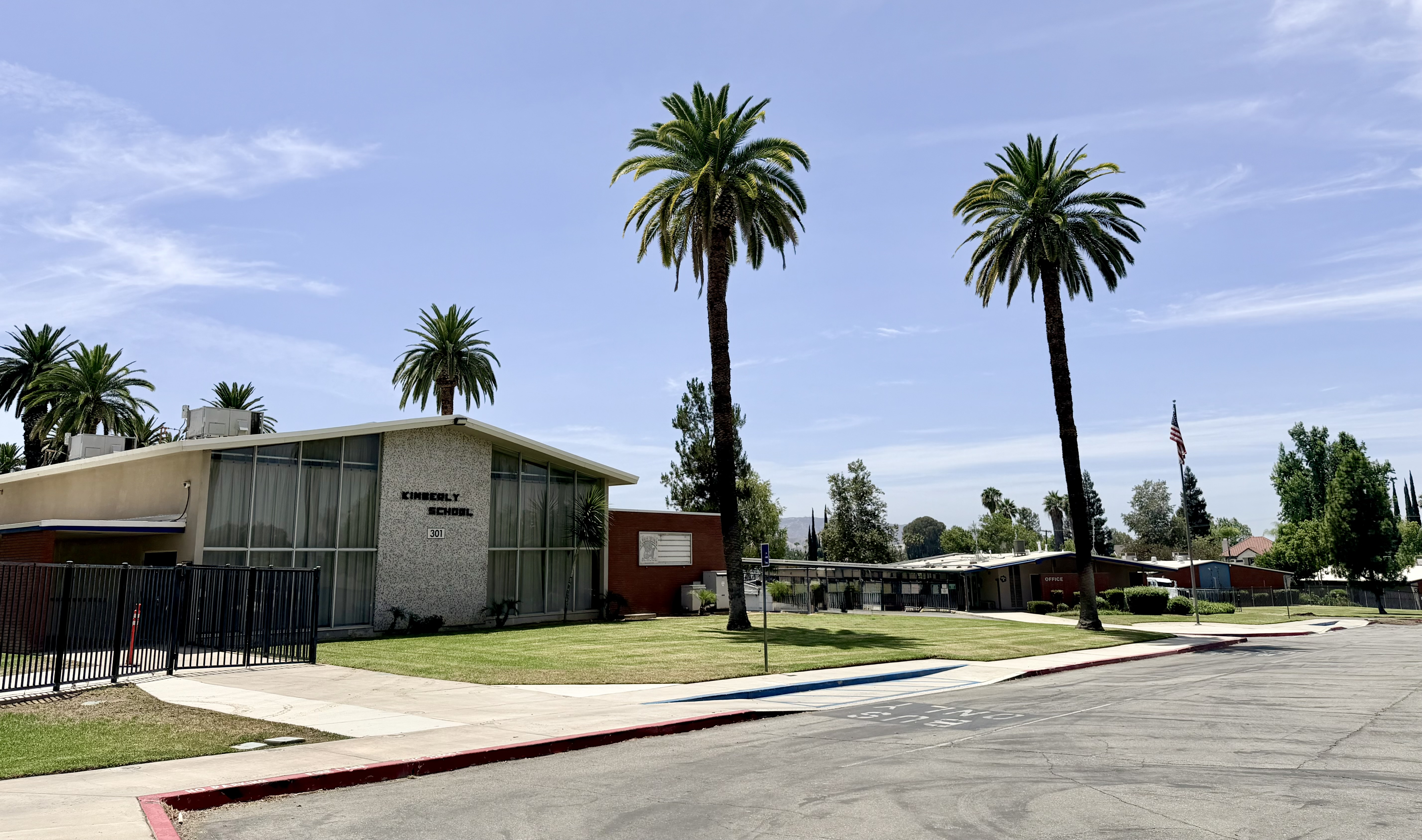

Location
- 301 West South Avenue; Redlands, California 92373

Information
- Type: Public (U.S.)
- Founded: 1957; 69 years ago
- Principal: Emily Elgan
- Grades: Pre-kindergarten through 5th
- Campus: suburban
- Colors: Blue and White
- Team name: Cubs
- Website: kimberly.redlandsusd.net

Judson & Brown Elementary School
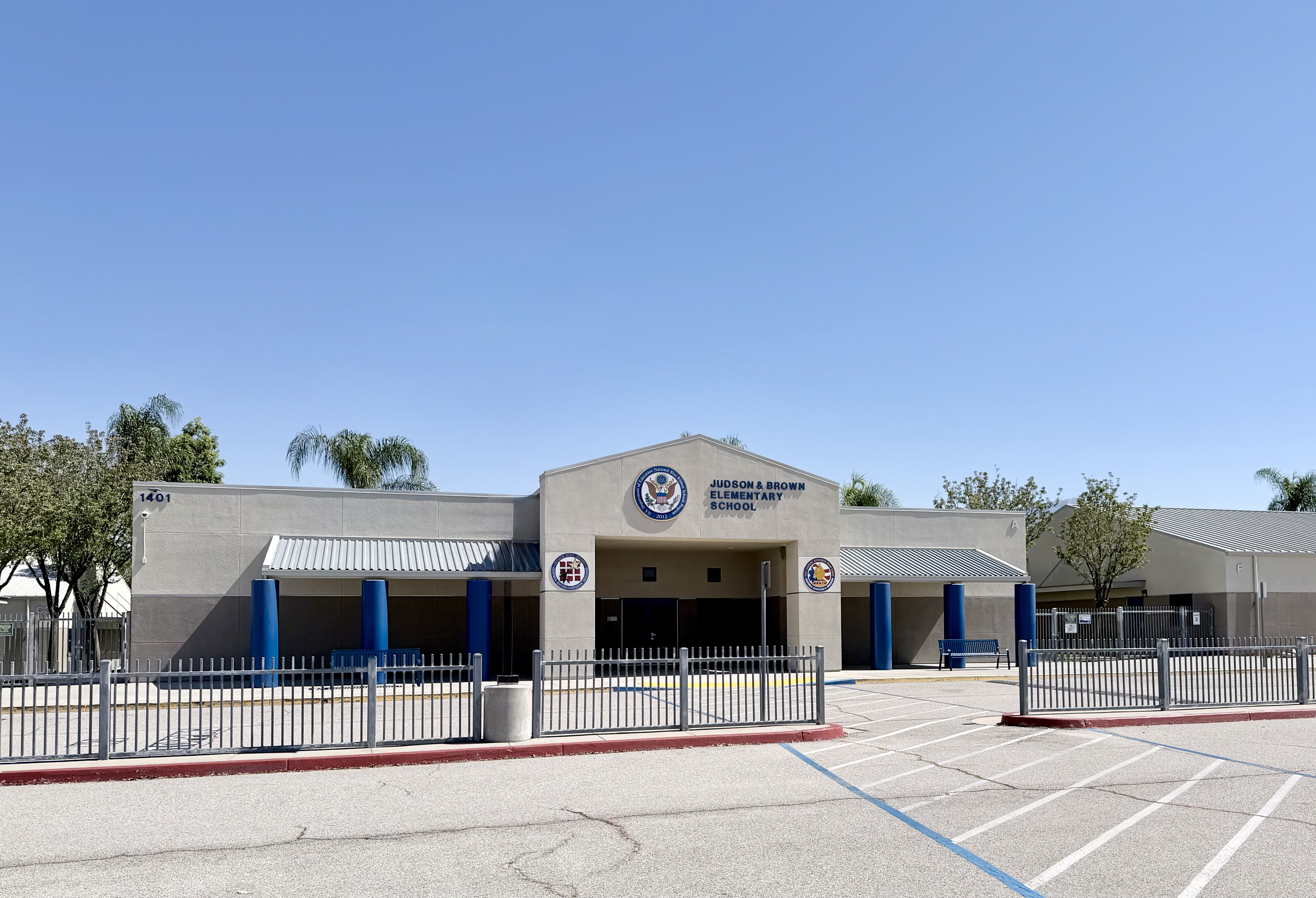

Location
- 1401 E Pennsylvania Ave. Redlands, California 92374

Information
- Type: Public (U.S.)
- Founded: 2006; 20 years ago
- Principal: Robyn Rivera
- Grades: Pre-kindergarten through 5th
- Enrollment: 500
- Campus: suburban
- Colors: Maroon and White
- Team name: Jaguars
- Website: judsonandbrown.redlandsusd.net

Cram Elementary School
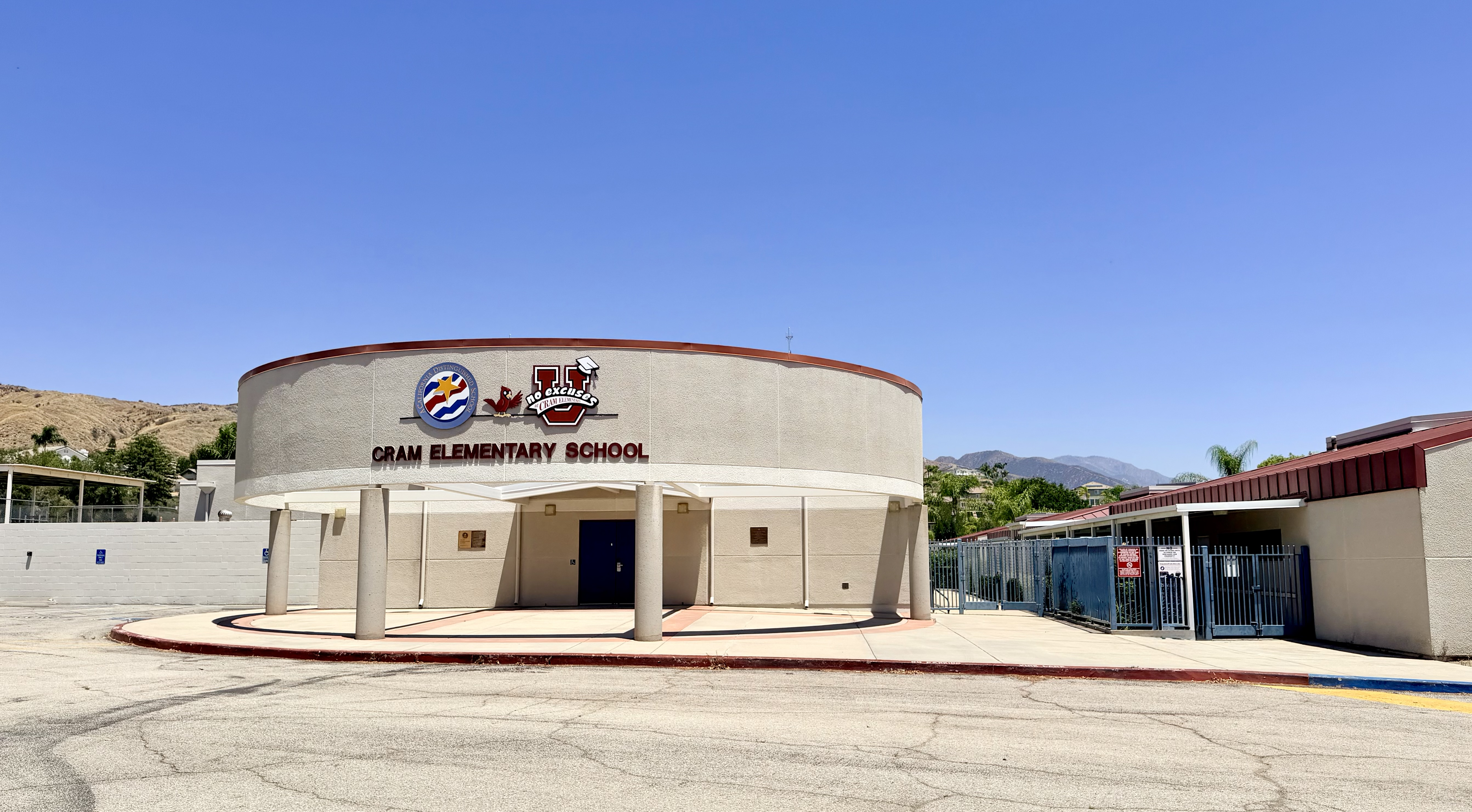

Location
- 29700 Water Street; Highland, California 92346

Information
- Type: Public (U.S.)
- Founded: 1869; 157 years ago (closed 1991 thru 1997)
- Principal: Michael Laba
- Grades: Pre-kindergarten through 5th
- Campus: suburban
- Colors: Red and White
- Team name: Cardinals
- Website: cram.redlandsusd.net

Crafton Elementary School
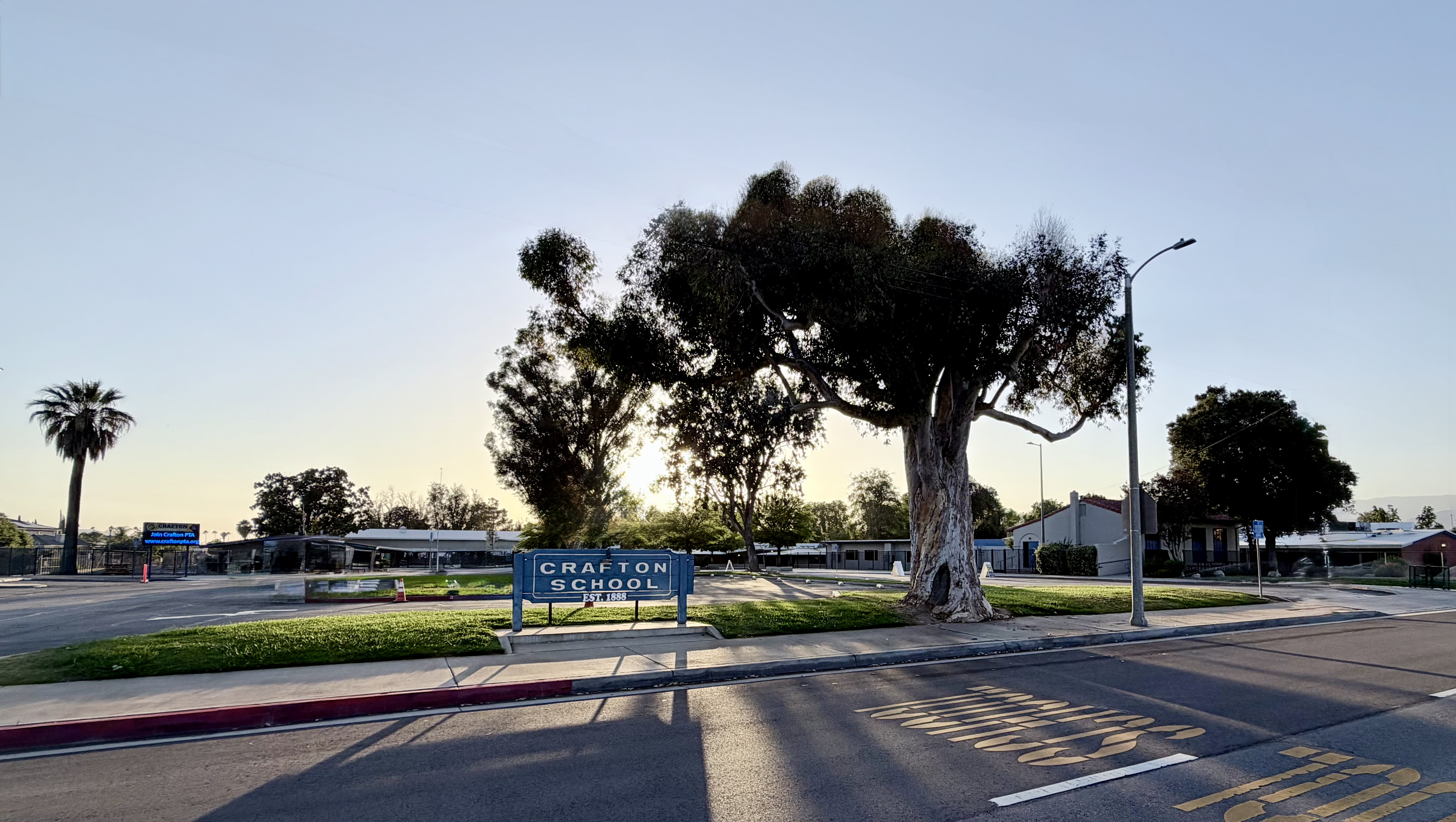

Location
- 311 North Wabash; Redlands, California 92374

Information
- Type: Public (U.S.)
- Founded: 1888; 138 years ago
- Principal: Kellee Baker
- Grades: Pre-kindergarten through 5th
- Enrollment: 620
- Campus: suburban
- Colors: Navy Blue and Gold
- Team name: Cougars
- Website: crafton.redlandsusd.net

Bryn Mawr Elementary School
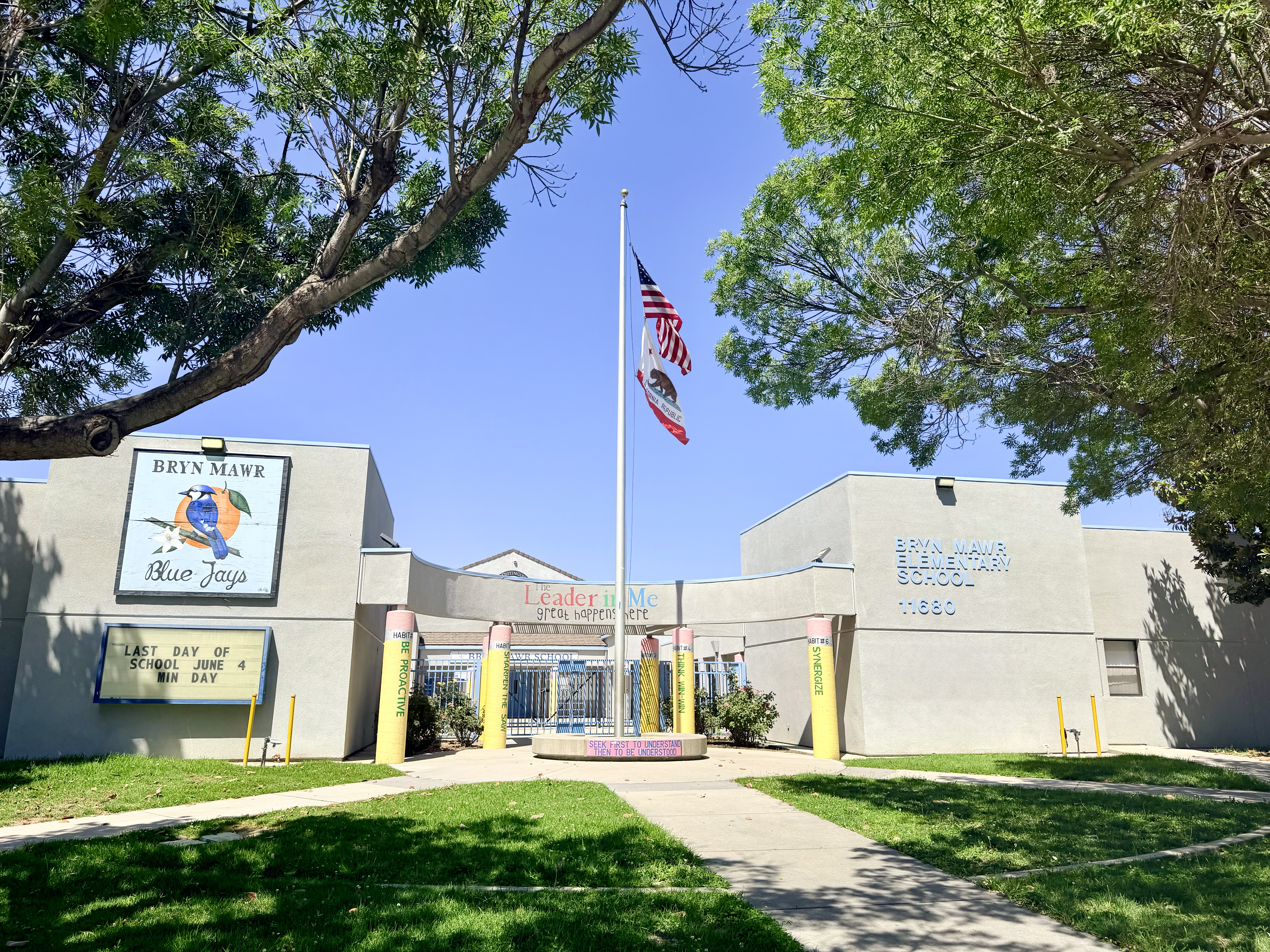

Location
- 11680 Whittier Ave. Loma Linda (Bryn Mawr), California 92354

Information
- Type: Public (U.S.)
- Founded: 1911; 115 years ago (closed 1947 thru 1992)
- Principal: NeChé Thompson
- Grades: Pre-kindergarten through 5th
- Enrollment: 916
- Campus: suburban
- Colors: Blue and White
- Team name: Blue Jays
- Website: brynmawr.redlandsusd.net

Victoria Elementary School
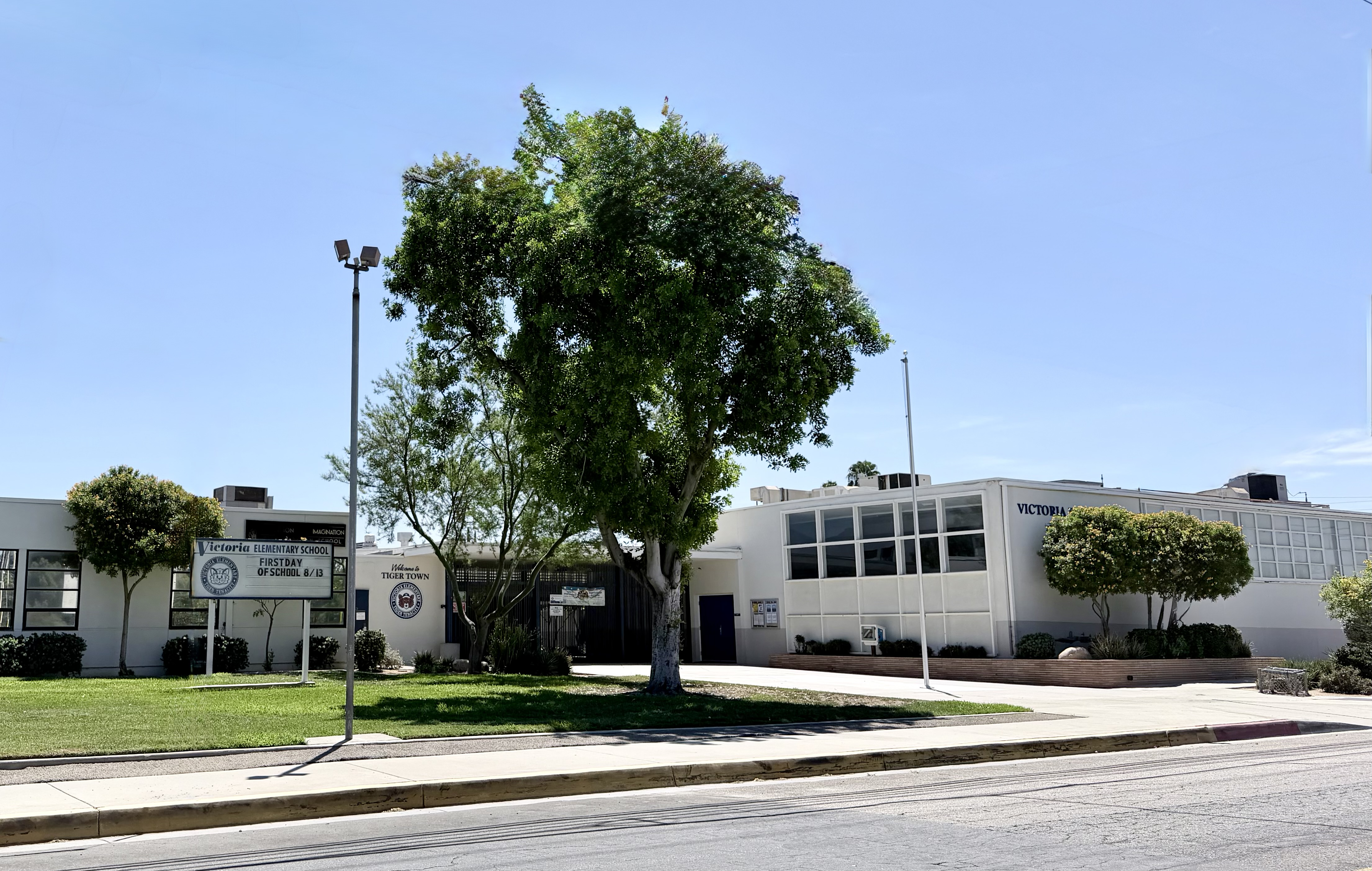

Location
- 1505 Richardson Street; San Bernardino, California 92408

Information
- Type: Public (U.S.)
- Founded: 1949; 77 years ago
- Principal: Dr. Estella Patel
- Grades: Pre-kindergarten through 5th
- Enrollment: 785
- Campus: suburban
- Colors: Light blue and white
- Team name: The Tigers
- Website: victoria.redlandsusd.net

Mariposa Elementary School
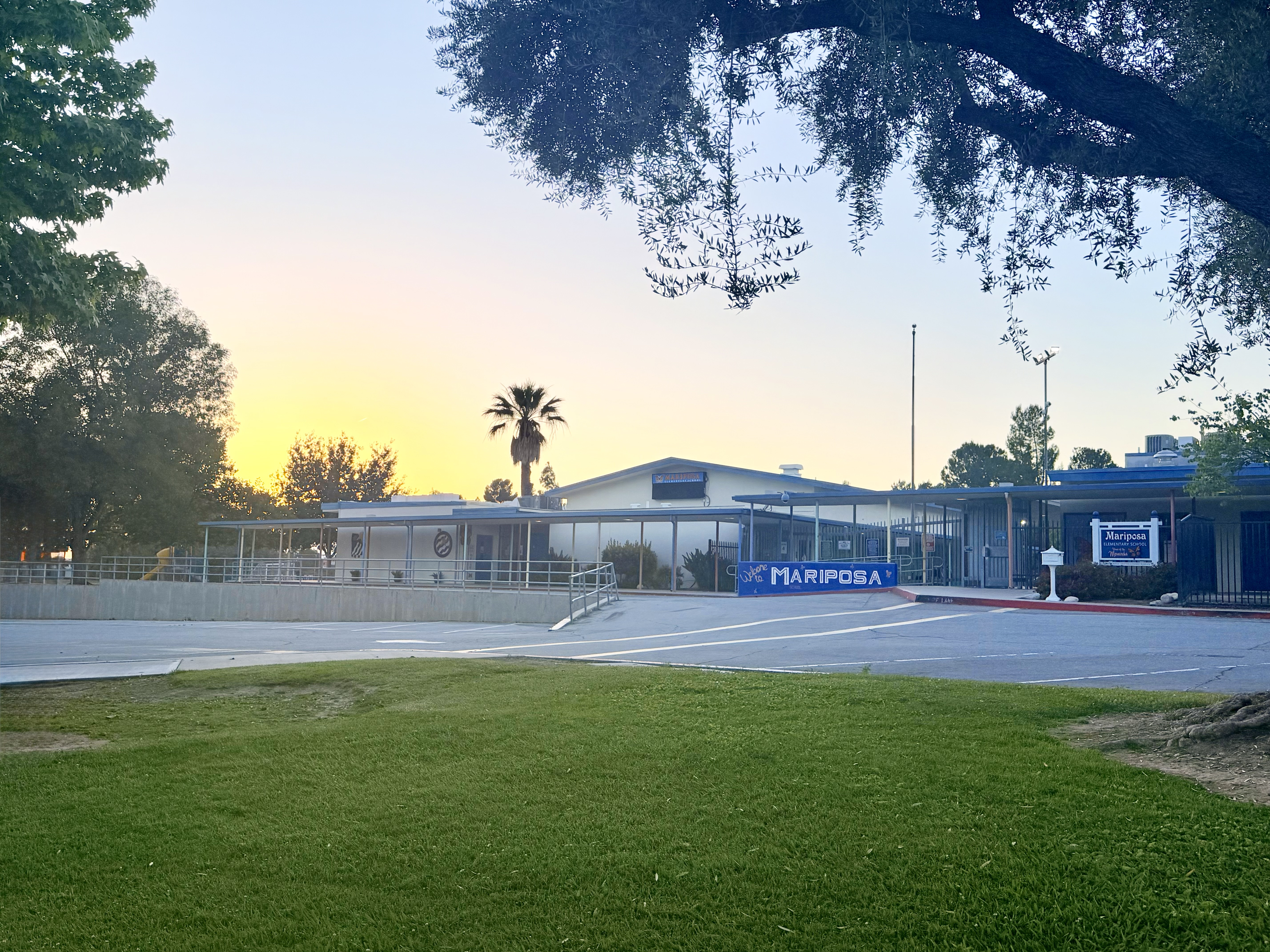

Location
- 30800 Palo Alto Dr. Redlands, California 92373

Information
- Type: Public (U.S.)
- Founded: 1964; 62 years ago
- Principal: Laraissa Gill
- Grades: Pre-kindergarten through 5th
- Campus: suburban
- Colors: Blue and White
- Team name: The Monarchs (butterfly)
- Website: mariposa.redlandsusd.net

Lugonia Elementary School
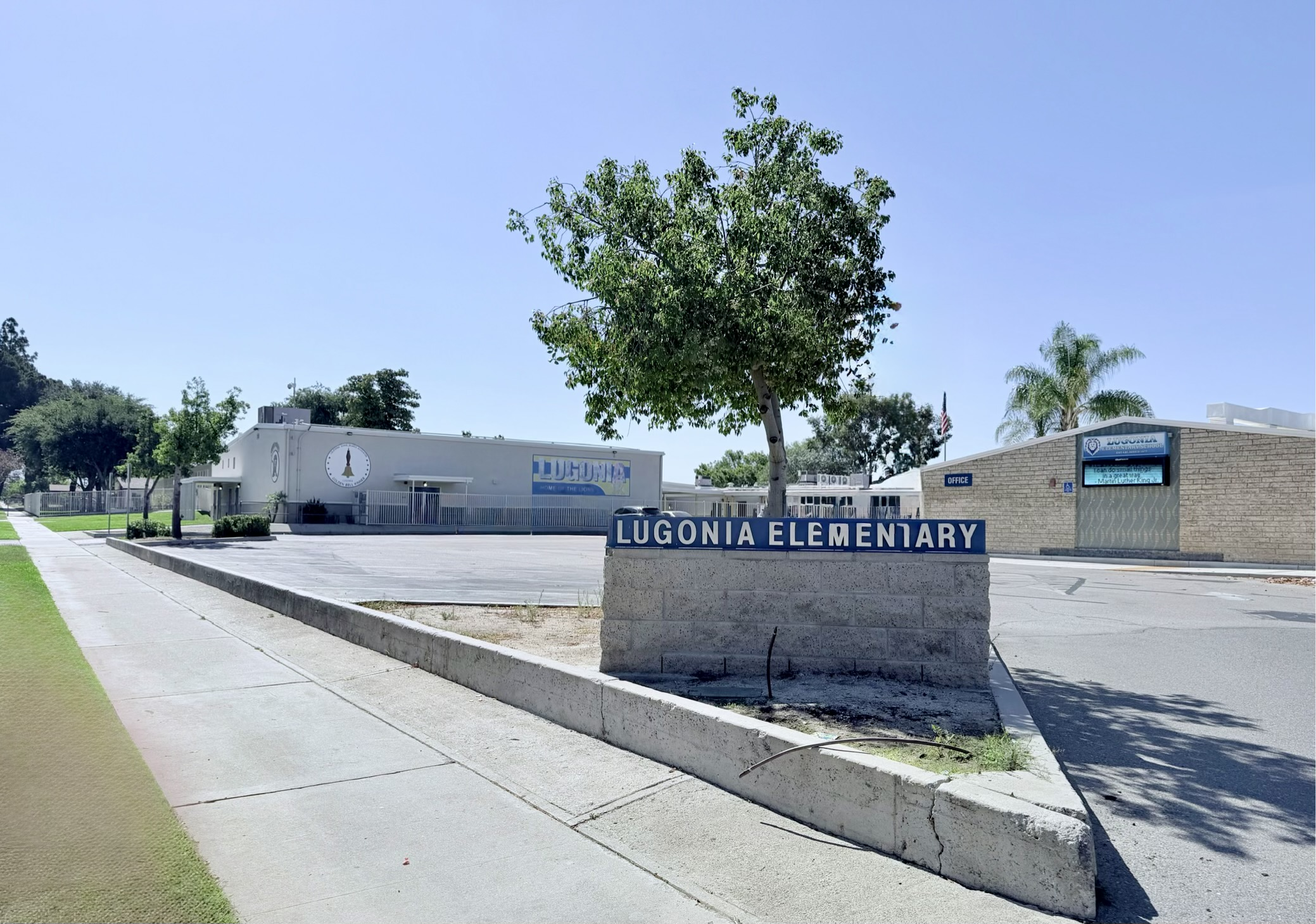

Location
- 202 E. Pennsylvania Ave. Redlands, California 92374

Information
- Type: Public (U.S.)
- Founded: May 14, 1877; 149 years ago
- Principal: Dr. Sara Burton
- Grades: Pre-kindergarten through 5th
- Campus: suburban
- Color: Navy
- Team name: Lions
- Website: lugonia.redlandsusd.net

Franklin Elementary School
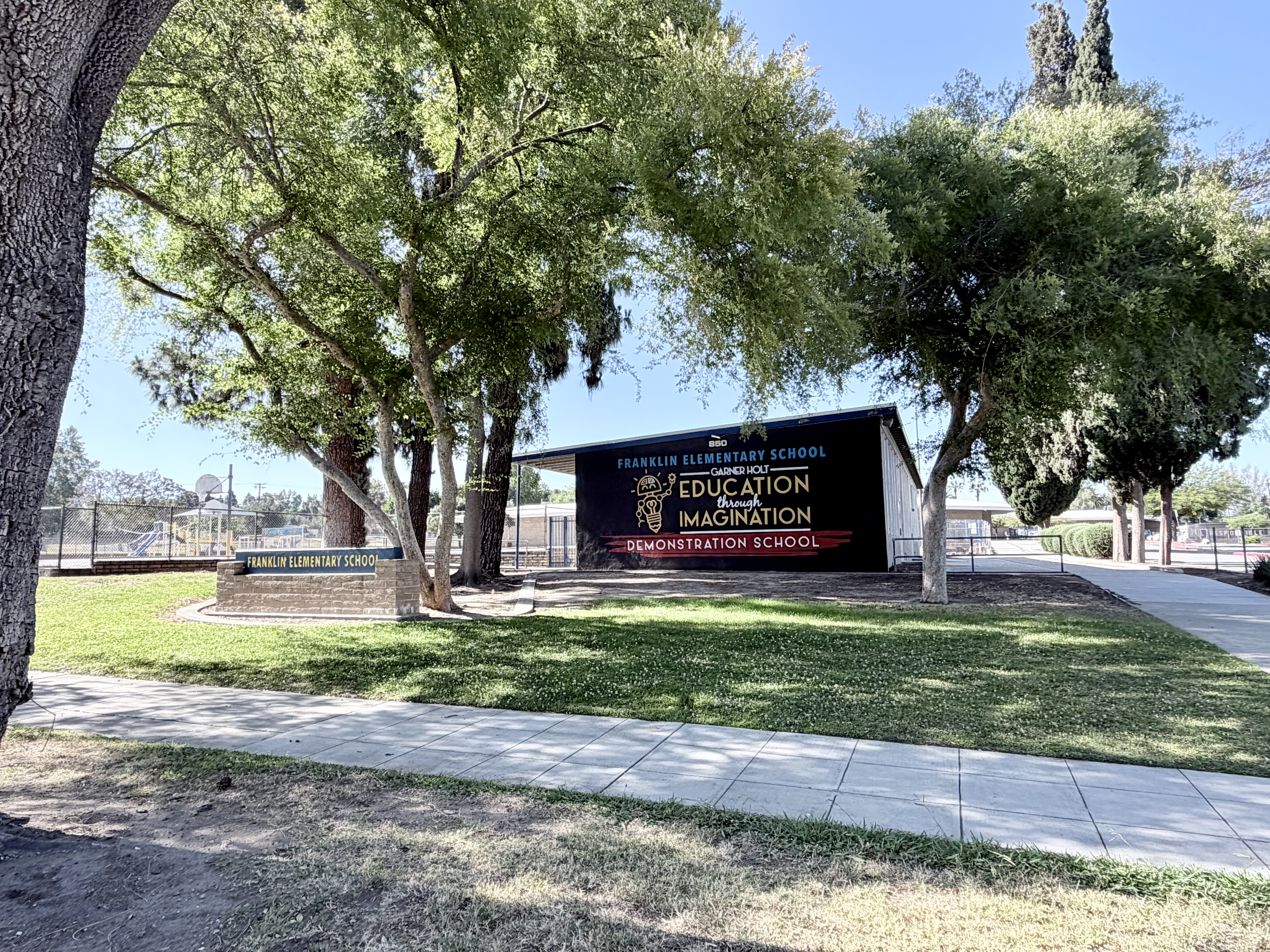

Location
- 850 East Colton Avenue; Redlands, California 92374

Information
- Type: Public (U.S.)
- Founded: 1903; 123 years ago
- Principal: James Benanti
- Grades: Pre-kindergarten through 5th
- Campus: suburban
- Colors: Blue and Gold
- Team name: Falcons
- Website: franklin.redlandsusd.net

Arroyo Verde Elementary School
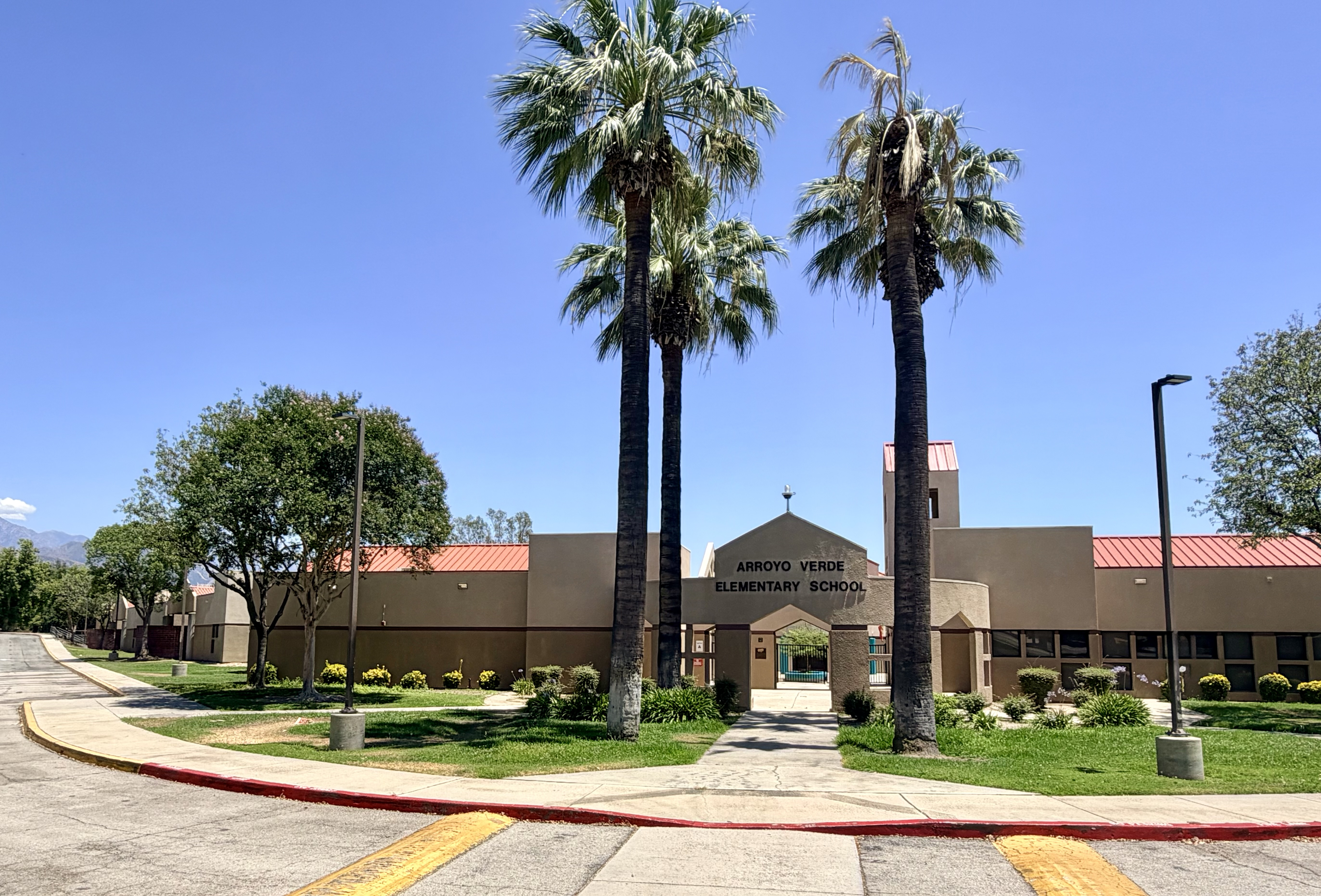

Location
- 7701 Church Street; Highland, California 92346

Information
- Type: Public (U.S.)
- Founded: 1924; 102 years ago (closed 1945 thru 1990)
- Principal: Rebecca Acosta
- Grades: Pre-kindergarten through 5th
- Enrollment: 785
- Campus: suburban
- Colors: Turquoise and white
- Team name: The Aztecs
- Website: arroyoverde.redlandsusd.net

Mentone Elementary School
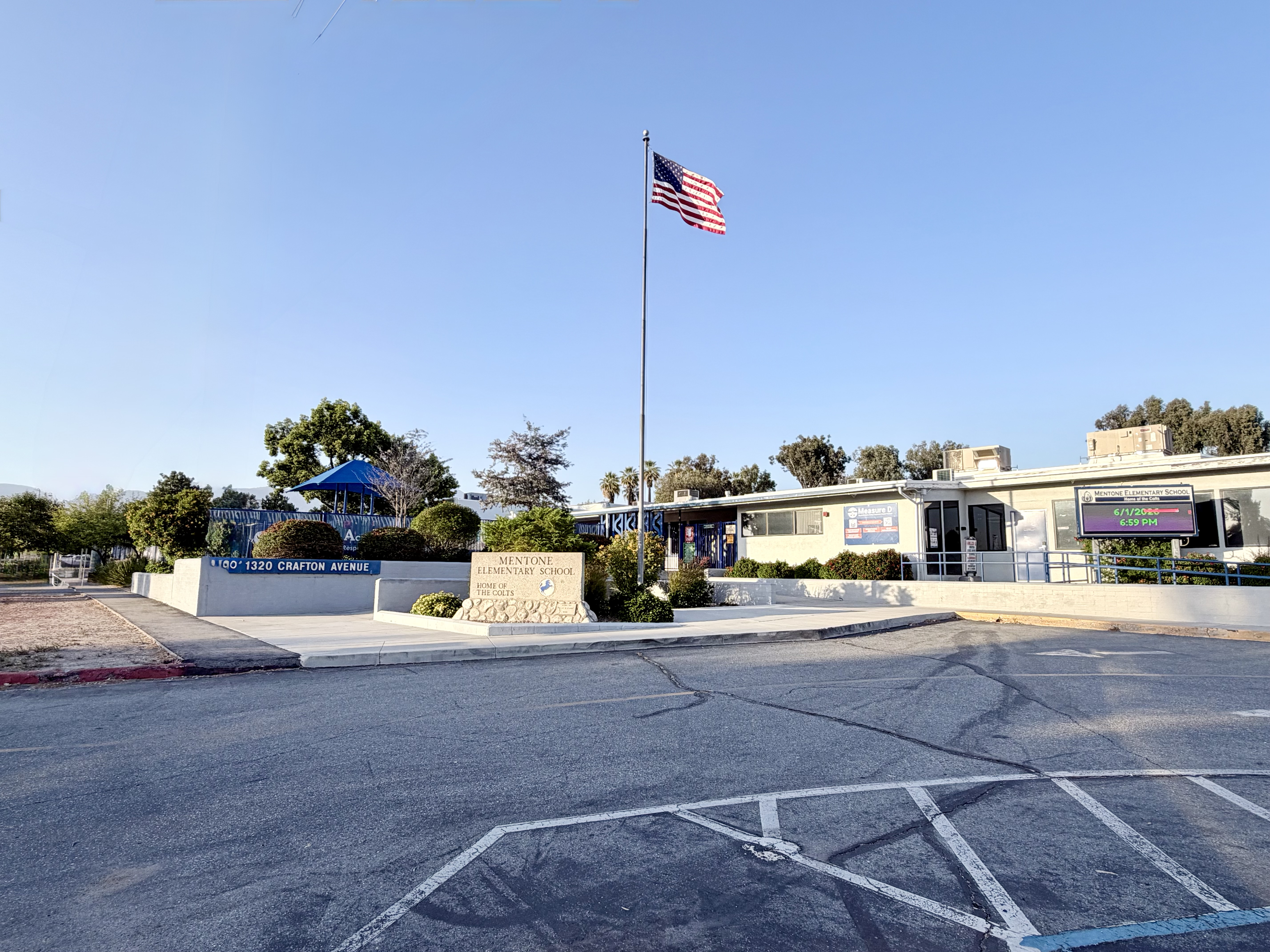

Location
- 645 Crafton Avenue; Mentone, California 92374

Information
- Type: Public (U.S.)
- Founded: 1949; 77 years ago
- Principal: Blake Hardeman
- Grades: Pre-kindergarten through 5th
- Campus: suburban
- Color: Blue
- Team name: Colts
- Website: mentone.redlandsusd.net

Highland Grove Elementary School
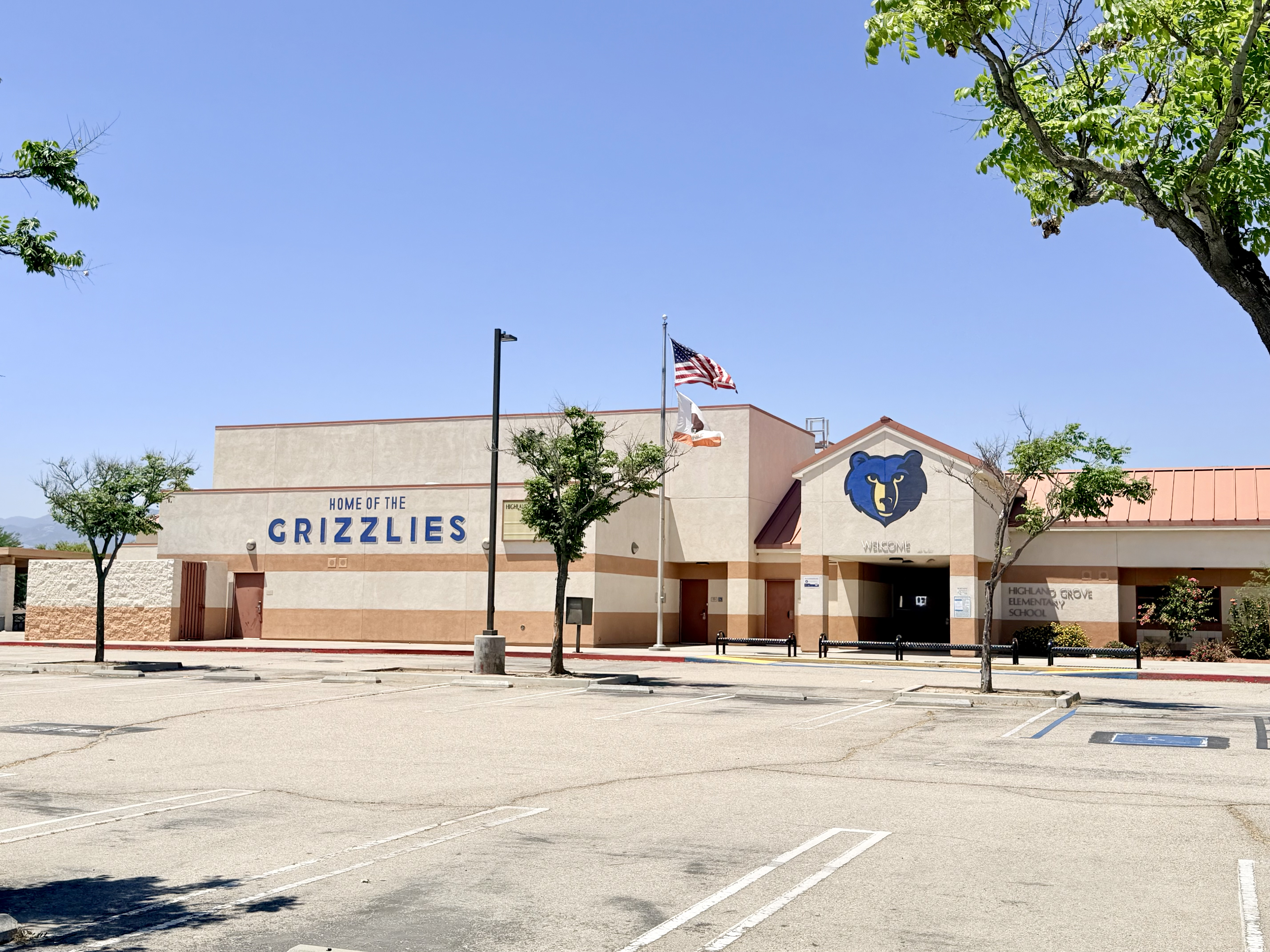

Location
- 7700 Orange Street; Highland, California 92346

Information
- Type: Public (U.S.)
- Founded: 2005; 21 years ago
- Principal: Kristi Castro
- Grades: Pre-kindergarten through 5th
- Campus: suburban
- Colors: Blue and Gold
- Team name: Grizzly Bear
- Website: highlandgrove.redlandsusd.net

== Middle schools (junior high) ==
Cope Middle School
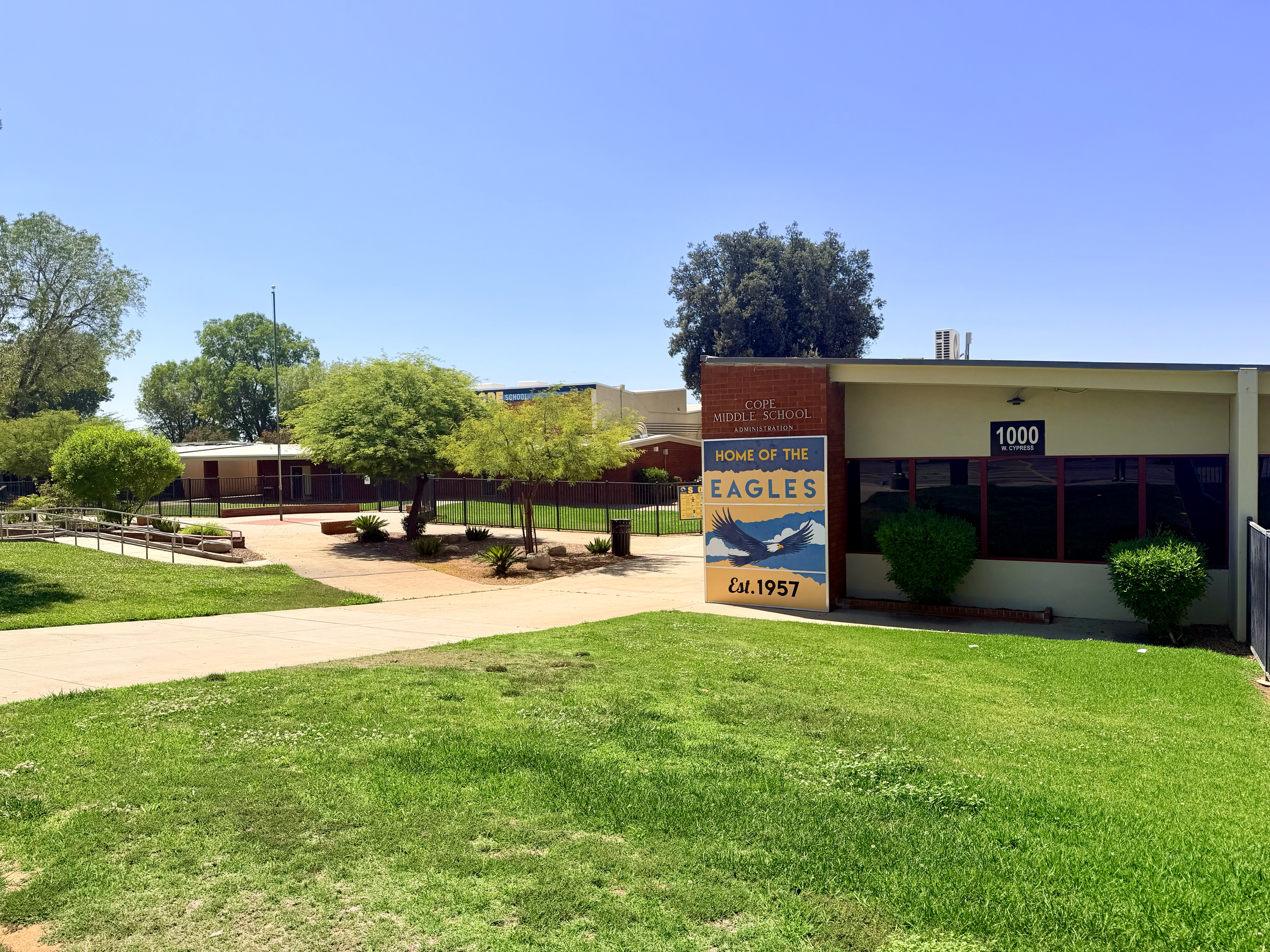

Location
- 1000 W. Cypress Avenue; Redlands, California 92373

Information
- Type: Public (U.S.)
- Established: 1957; 69 years ago
- Principal: Wendy Caress
- Grades: 6th grade through 8th
- Campus: suburban
- Colors: Gold and White
- Team name: The Eagles
- Newspaper: The Talon
- Website: cope.redlandsusd.net

The Grove Farm School

Location
- 11126 Iowa Street; Redlands, California 92373

Information
- Type: Public/charter (U.S.)
- Established: 2003; 23 years ago
- Principal: Michelle Sweezey
- Grades: 7th grade through 9th
- Campus: suburban
- Colors: Green and Silver and Black
- Team name: The Ravens
- Website: www.thegroveschool.org

Clement Middle School
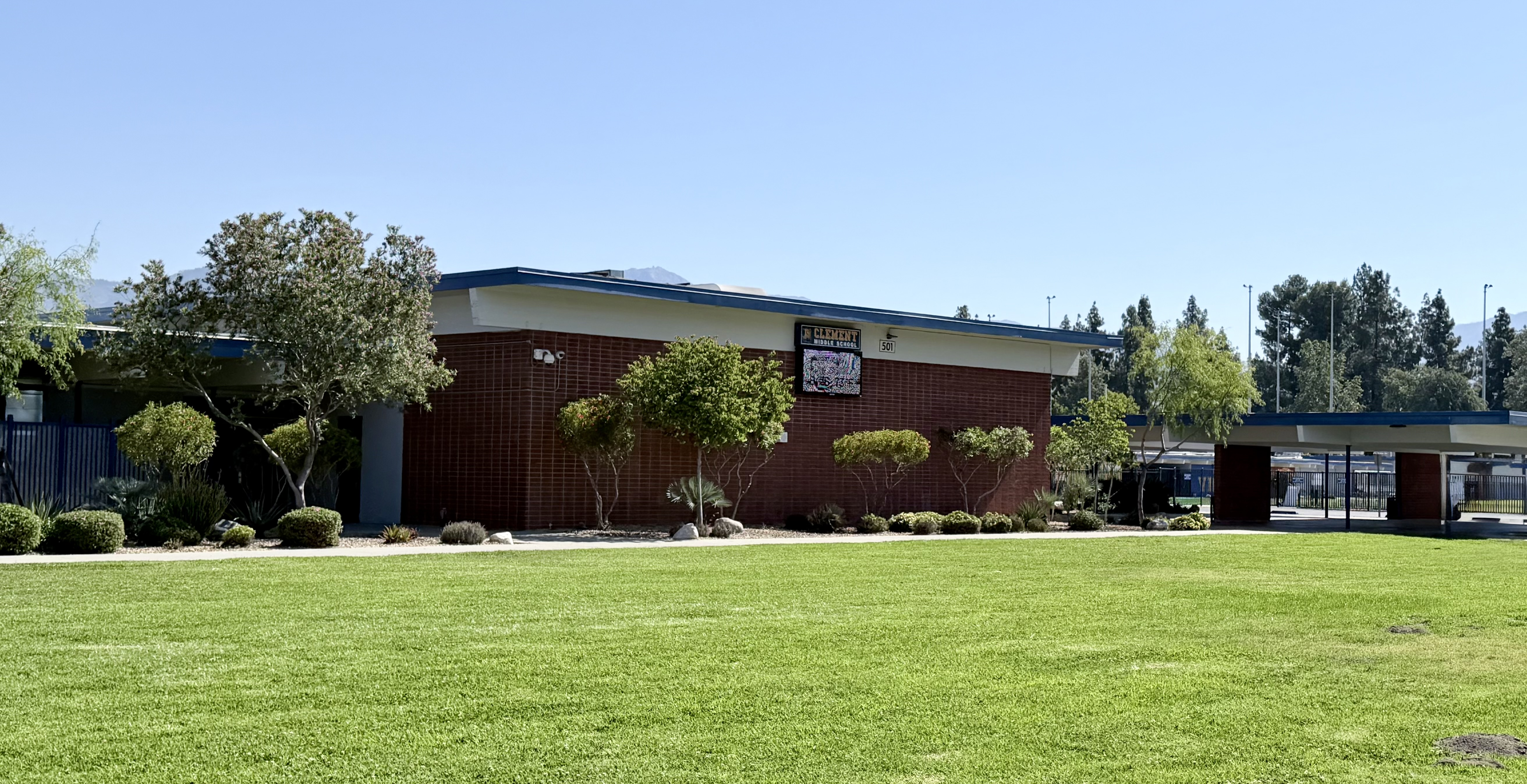

Location
- 501 E. Pennsylvania Ave. Redlands, California 92374

Information
- Type: Public (U.S.)
- Established: 1964; 62 years ago (RHS freshman campus between 1994 & 1997)
- Principal: Natalie Johnson
- Grades: 6th grade through 8th
- Campus: suburban
- Colors: Blue and Yellow
- Team name: The Vikings
- Newspaper: The Raven
- Website: clement.redlandsusd.net

Beattie Middle School
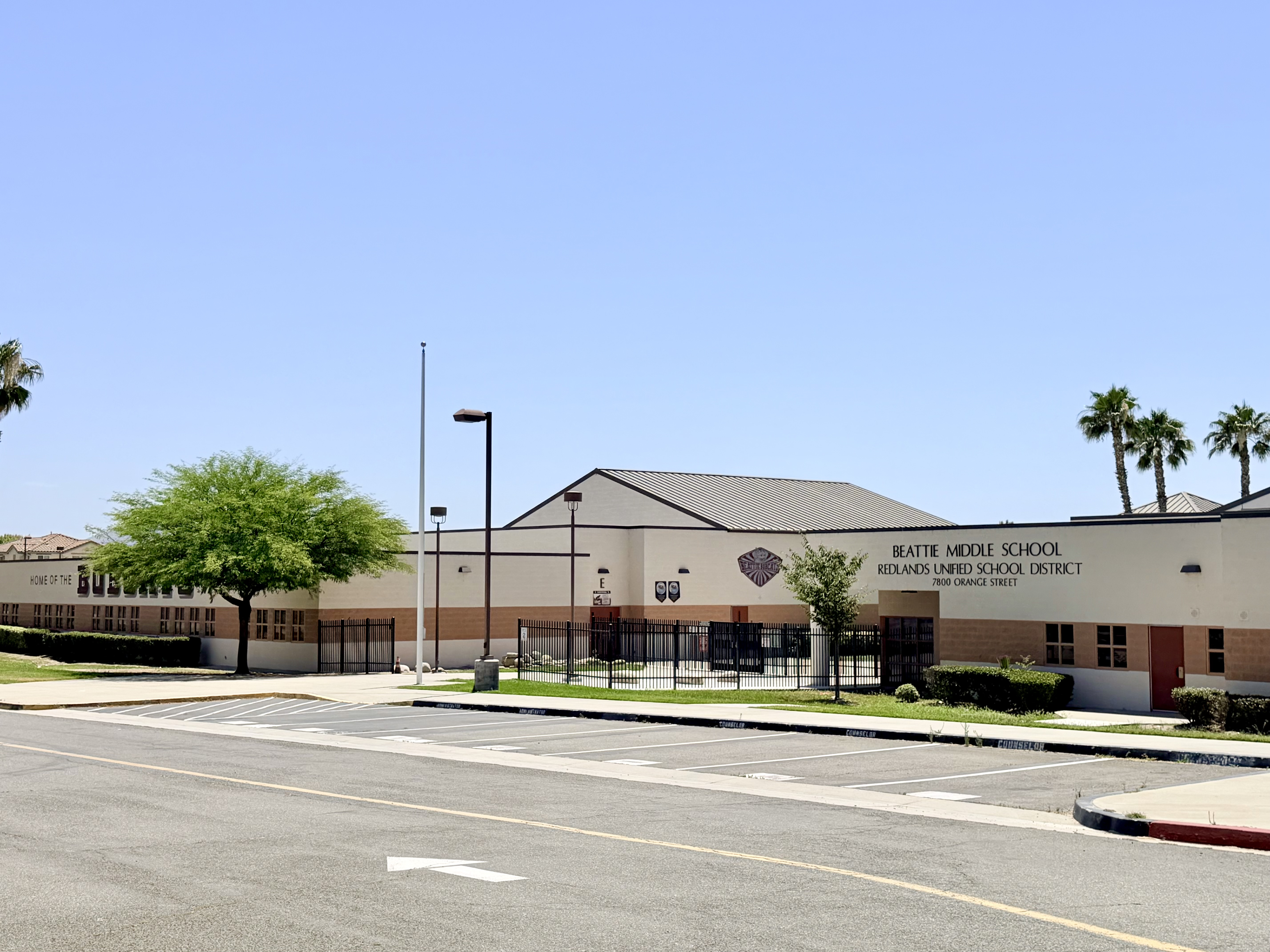

Location
- 7800 Orange Street; Highland, California 92346

Information
- Type: Public (U.S.)
- Established: 2005; 21 years ago
- Principal: J.J. Martinez
- Grades: 6th grade through 8th
- Campus: suburban
- Colors: Maroon and White
- Team name: The Bobcats
- Newspaper: Bobcat News
- Website: beattie.redlandsusd.net

Moore Middle School
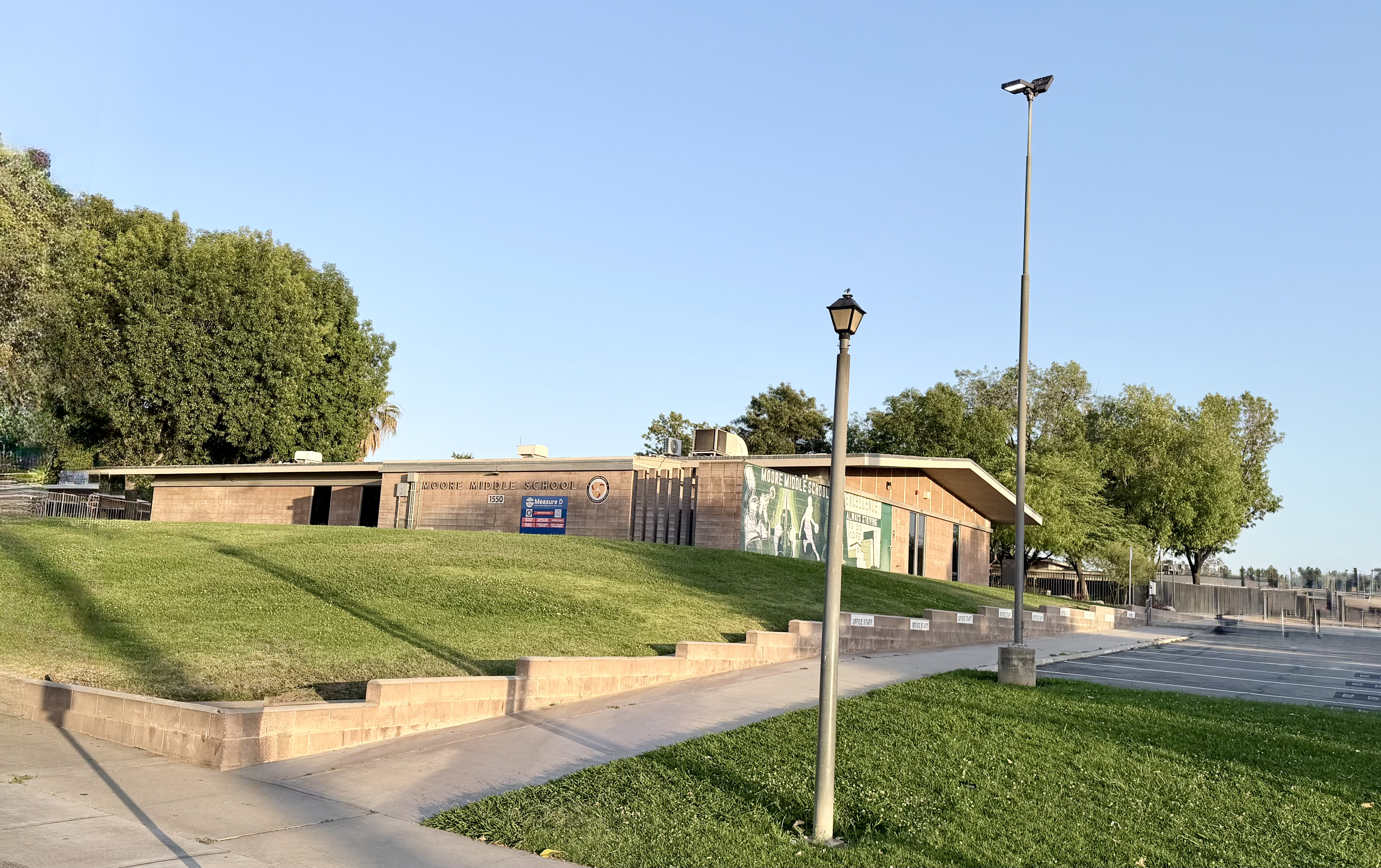

Location
- 1550 Highland Avenue; Redlands, California 92374

Information
- Type: Public (U.S.)
- Established: 1966; 60 years ago
- Principal: Jennie Dyerly
- Grades: 6th grade through 8th
- Campus: suburban
- Colors: Green and White
- Team name: The Monarchs (Lions)
- Newspaper: Moore Media
- Website: moore.redlandsusd.net

== High schools ==
The three comprehensive high schools, commonly known by their acronyms are: RHS, REV and CVHS. Each play in the California Division II Interscholastic sports league, Citrus Belt League.

Redlands High School
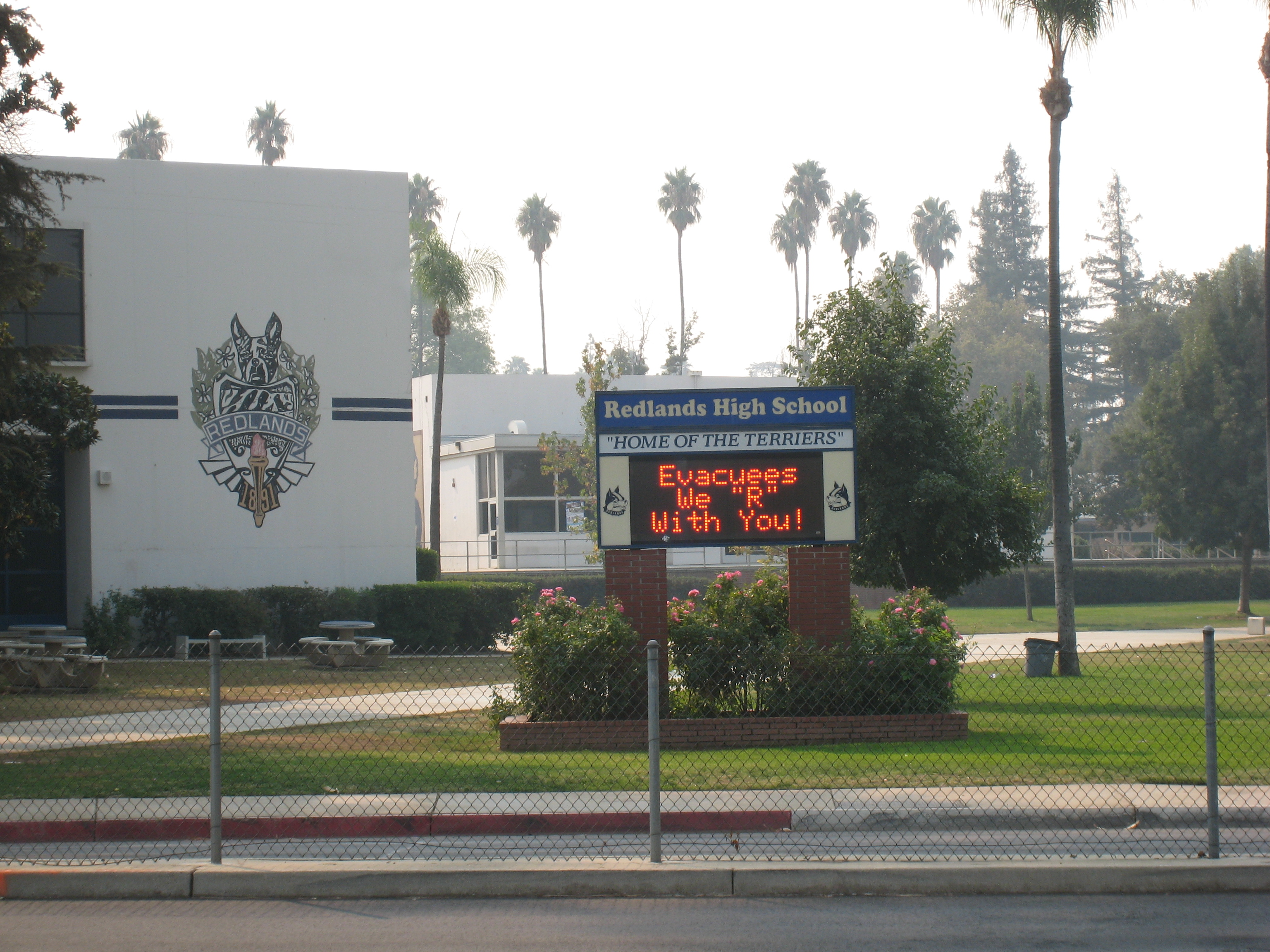

Location
- 840 East Citrus Avenue; Redlands, California 92373

Information
- School type: Public, Secondary
- Established: October 1, 1891; 135 years ago
- Principal: Wes Cullen
- Grades: 9th grade through 12th
- Campus: downtown
- Colors: Blue and White
- Nickname: RHS
- Team name: Terriers
- Newspaper: Hobachi
- Yearbook: Makio
- Website: rhs.redlandsusd.net

Orangewood Continuation High School
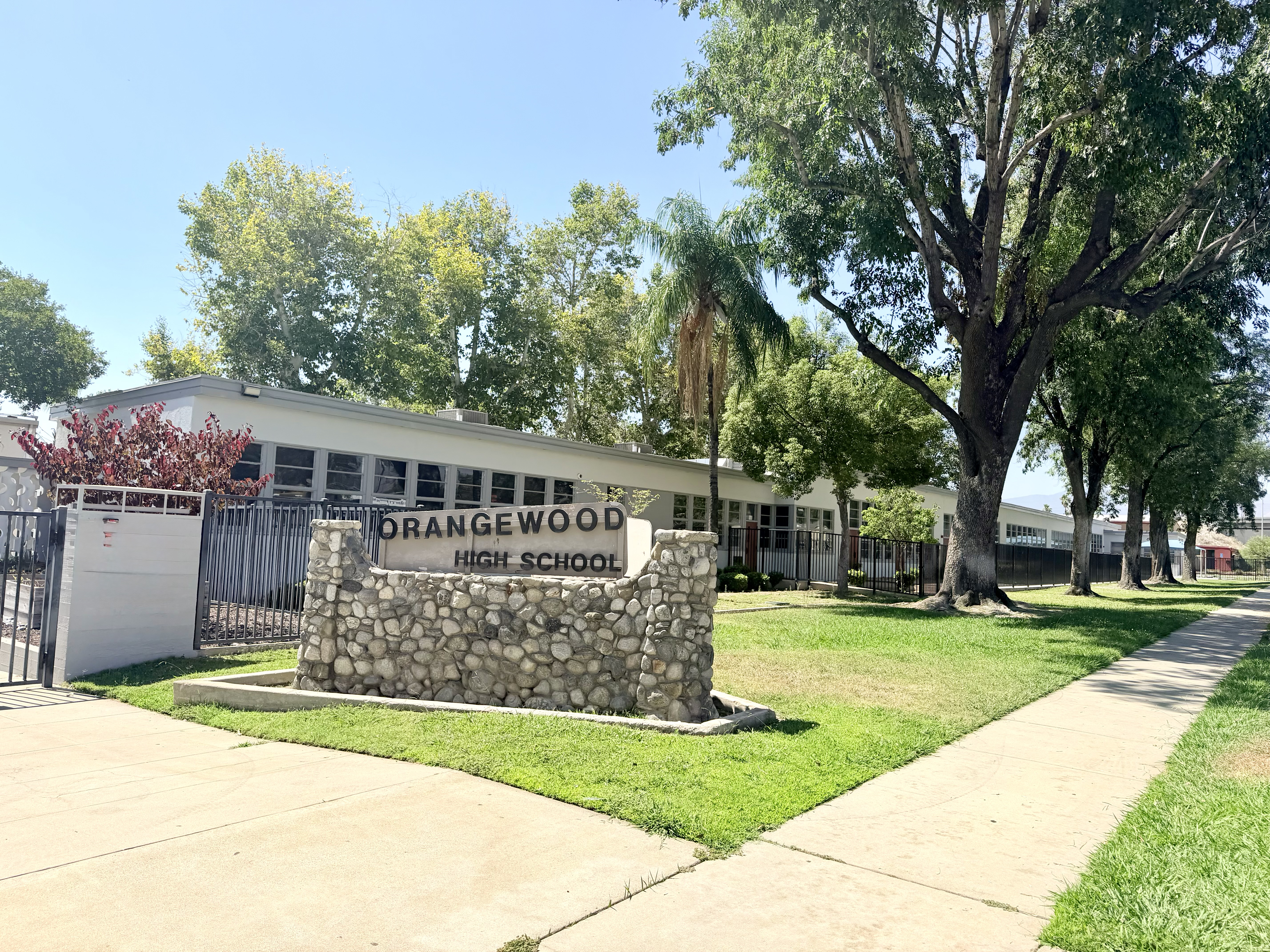

Location
- 515 Texas Street; Redlands, California 92374

Information
- School type: Public, Secondary
- Established: September 5, 1966; 60 years ago
- Principal: Carli Norris
- Campus: downtown
- Colors: Green and black
- Team name: Dragons
- Newspaper: Ethic News
- Yearbook: The OHS
- Website: orangewood.redlandsusd.net

Redlands East Valley High School
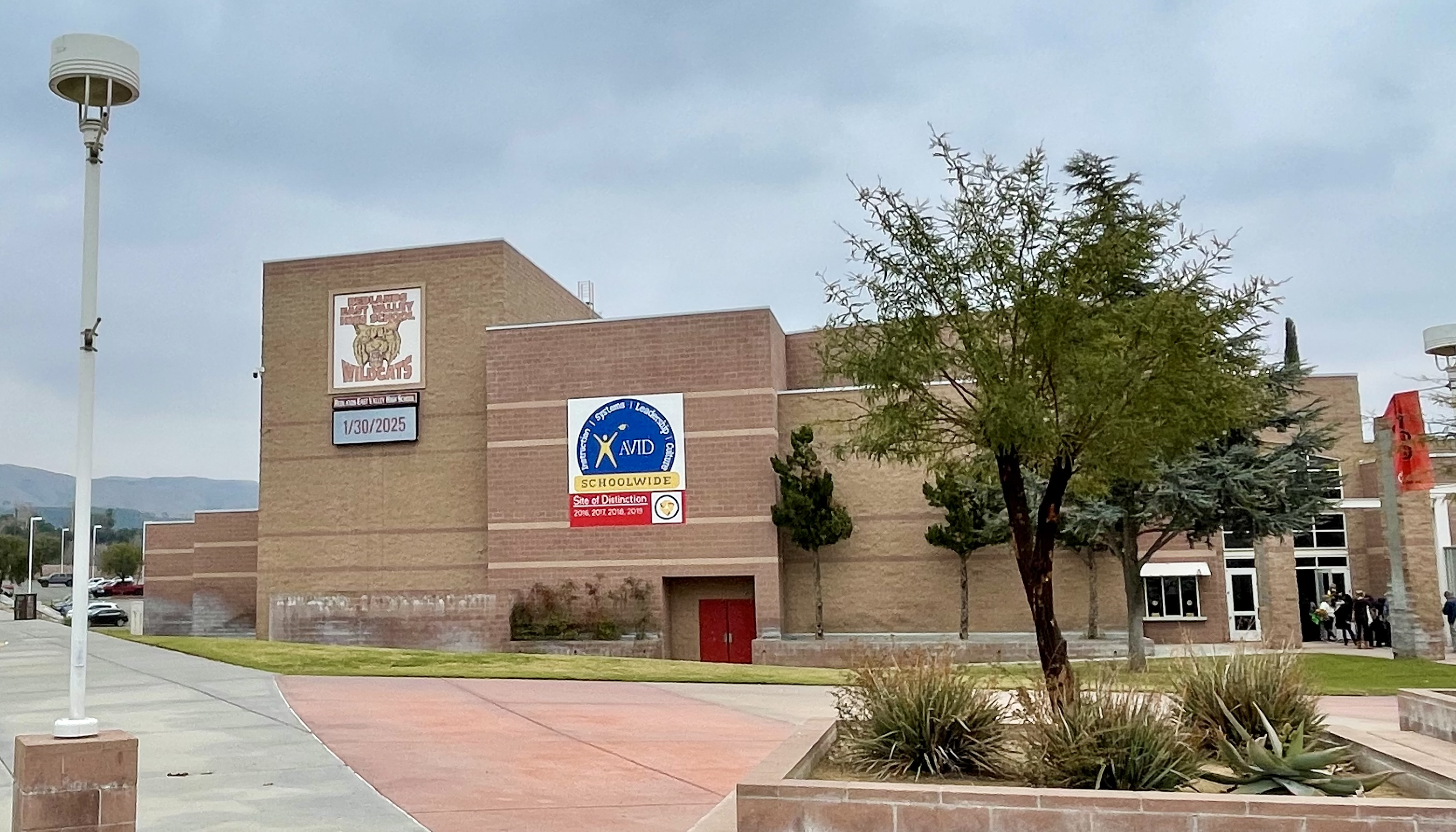

Location
- 31000 East Colton Avenue; Redlands, California 92374

Information
- School type: Public, Secondary
- Established: September 9, 1997; 29 years ago
- Principal: Shana Kamper
- Grades: 9th grade through 12th
- Campus: suburban
- Colors: Red, white and black
- Nickname: REV
- Team name: Wildcats
- Newspaper: Ethic News
- Yearbook: Odyssey
- Website: rev.redlandsusd.net

The Grove High School

Location
- 200 Nevada Street; Redlands, California 92373

Information
- School type: Public/charter (U.S.)
- Established: 1999; 27 years ago
- Principal: Ben Moudry
- Grades: 10th grade through 12th
- Campus: suburban
- Colors: Green and Silver and Black
- Team name: The Ravens
- Website: www.thegroveschool.org

Citrus Valley High School
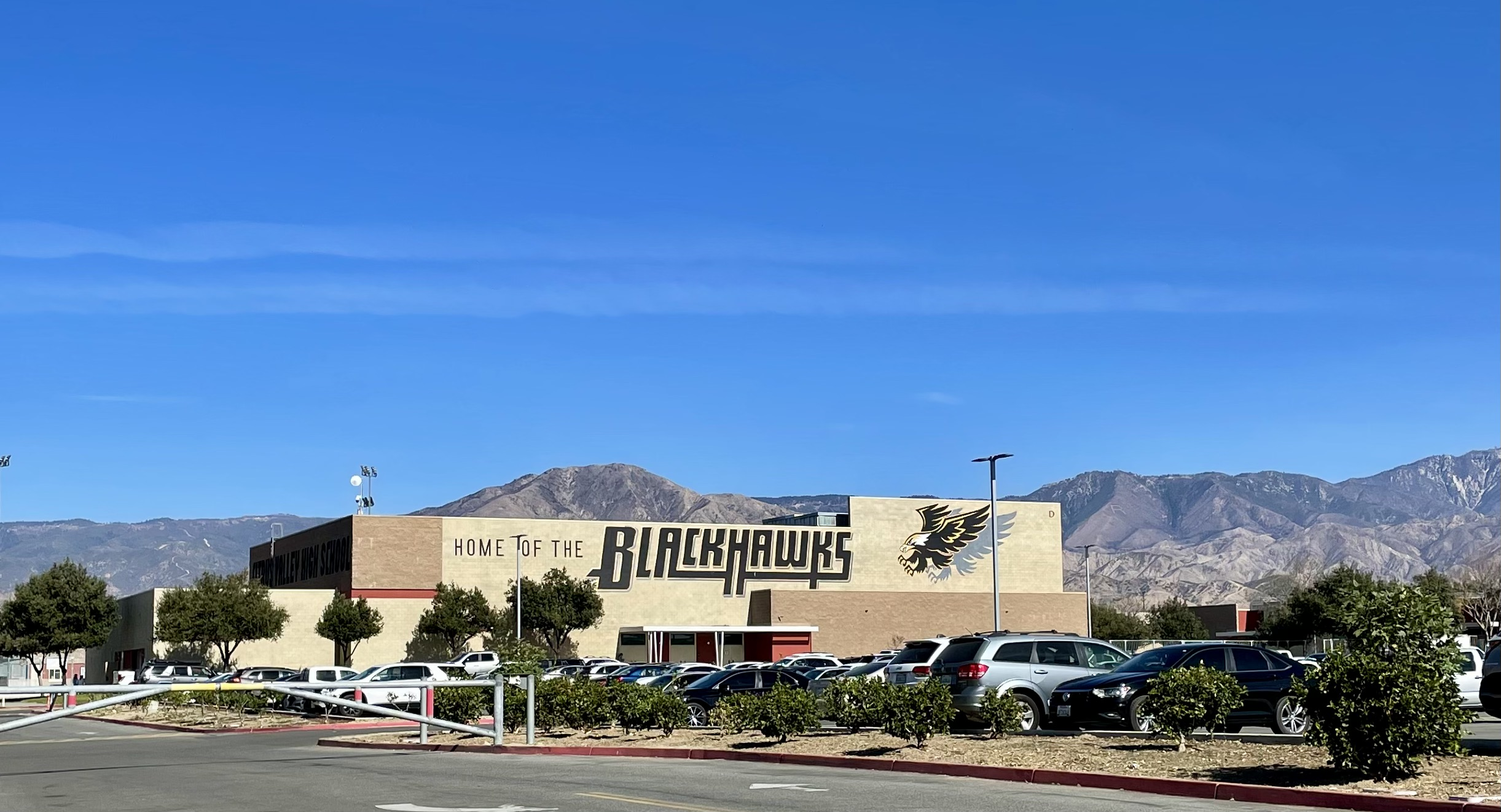

Location
- 800 West Pioneer Avenue; Redlands, California 92374

Information
- School type: Public, Secondary
- Established: August 12, 2009; 17 years ago
- Principal: Maisie McCue
- Grades: 9th grade through 12th
- Campus: suburban
- Colors: Gold and black
- Nickname: Citrus
- Team name: Blackhawks
- Newspaper: Bird Box
- Yearbook: no name
- Website: cvhs.redlandsusd.net

== Achievements ==
- The district has achieved multiple awards, including the National PTA Parent Involvement School's of Excellence award, a Model Continuation High School Award for Orangewood High School, a Title 1 Academic Achievement Award, California Achieving School's Award Program, a Golden Bell Award, a National Blue Ribbon Schools award, a California Pivotal Practice District Award and thruout the years, multiple school have achieved California Distinguished Schools awards. For example, in 2025, eleven schools and the district received Educational Results Partnership - California Distinguished Schools Honor Roll, a statewide achievement.
- RUSD has produced elite professional athletes, including soccer star Landon Donovan, NFL players Jaelan Phillips, Brian DeRoo, Greg Horton, Patrick Johnson, Jim Weatherwax, Jakobie Keeney-James, Brian Billick and Kylie Fitts. MLB pitchers Matt Andriese, Julio Cruz, Ed Vande Berg, and Tommy Hanson, as well as Olympic bronze medalist Robin Backhaus. Recently, REVHS placed third in state-level tennis, and athletes like Katie Hornung reached the 2025 cross country state finals. The boys water polo team posted a 24-9 season under standout players and captains like Nico Perna in 2022, who made the US National Water Polo Team.

== Controversy ==
- Bryn Mawr Elementary school was designated as "the Mexican school" in 1911 for Spanish speaking children of citrus workers. The school was located on the southeast corner of Mayberry Street and Whittier Avenue. Efforts by PTA member parent Rafaela Landeros Rey, she challenged the segregation at RUSD. By 1942, she was able to change the segregation policy. RUSD self de-segregated in 1942, years before state law banned the practice in passing California Assembly Bill 1375 (The Anderson Bill) and the United States Court of Appeals for the Ninth Circuit issuing a ruling in Mendez v. Westminster in 1947. When RUSD integrated, all children went to Mission Elementary School and Bryn Mawr Elementary was closed by 1947. A new Bryn Mawr Elementary school would later re-open three blocks south on Whittier Avenue in Loma Linda, California in 1993.
- The district has had a large number of child molestation criminal and civil abuse cases. Twenty five teachers and staff have been accused by over fifty students since 1999. Following an investigation in the early 2020's, the district entered into a stipulated judgment in 2024 with the California Department of Justice, placing RUSD under five years of monitoring. To date, the district has paid out over $50 million in damages to affected students and families. RUSD abuse cases gained nationwide attention, including a high-profile CBS News report named "Pledge of Silence" that aired nationally.
- Current board member Candy Olsen was accused of being antisemitic and racist in 2025 by local parent organizations. 1,500 complaints were received at a school board meeting about Olsens post and likes on social media. Olsen stated her social media was taken out of context. Since elected, Olsen has followed the second Trump administrations "MAGA agenda" of banning school library books, certain flags and curriculum she deemed as "Critical Race Theory". The project 2025 debate garnered nationwide attention.
- Local folklore about a ghost haunting at Mariposa Elementary School has trespassers occasionally entering school grounds after hours. As the Urban legend has it, a young school boy named Billy was struck by a bus and killed while riding his bicycle in front of the school in the 1950s. The school district states the story is false and never happened.
