= Redlands East Valley High School =

Location
- 31000 East Colton Avenue; Redlands, California, 92374; United States; 34.0613°N 117.1288°W

Information
- Type: Senior High School
- Established: September 9, 1997
- School district: Redlands Unified School District
- Principal: Shana Kamper
- Teaching staff: 91.77 (FTE)
- Grades: 9th-12th
- Enrollment: 1,866 (2023-2024)
- Student to teacher ratio: 20.33
- Colors: Red, white and black
- Nickname: Wildcats
- Rival: Redlands High School
- Website: rev.redlandsusd.net

Redlands East Valley High School (REVHS) is a public English medium co-educational high school in Redlands, California, United States, near the San Bernardino Mountains. The school opened in the 1997–1998 school year as part of the Redlands Unified School District.

== Description ==
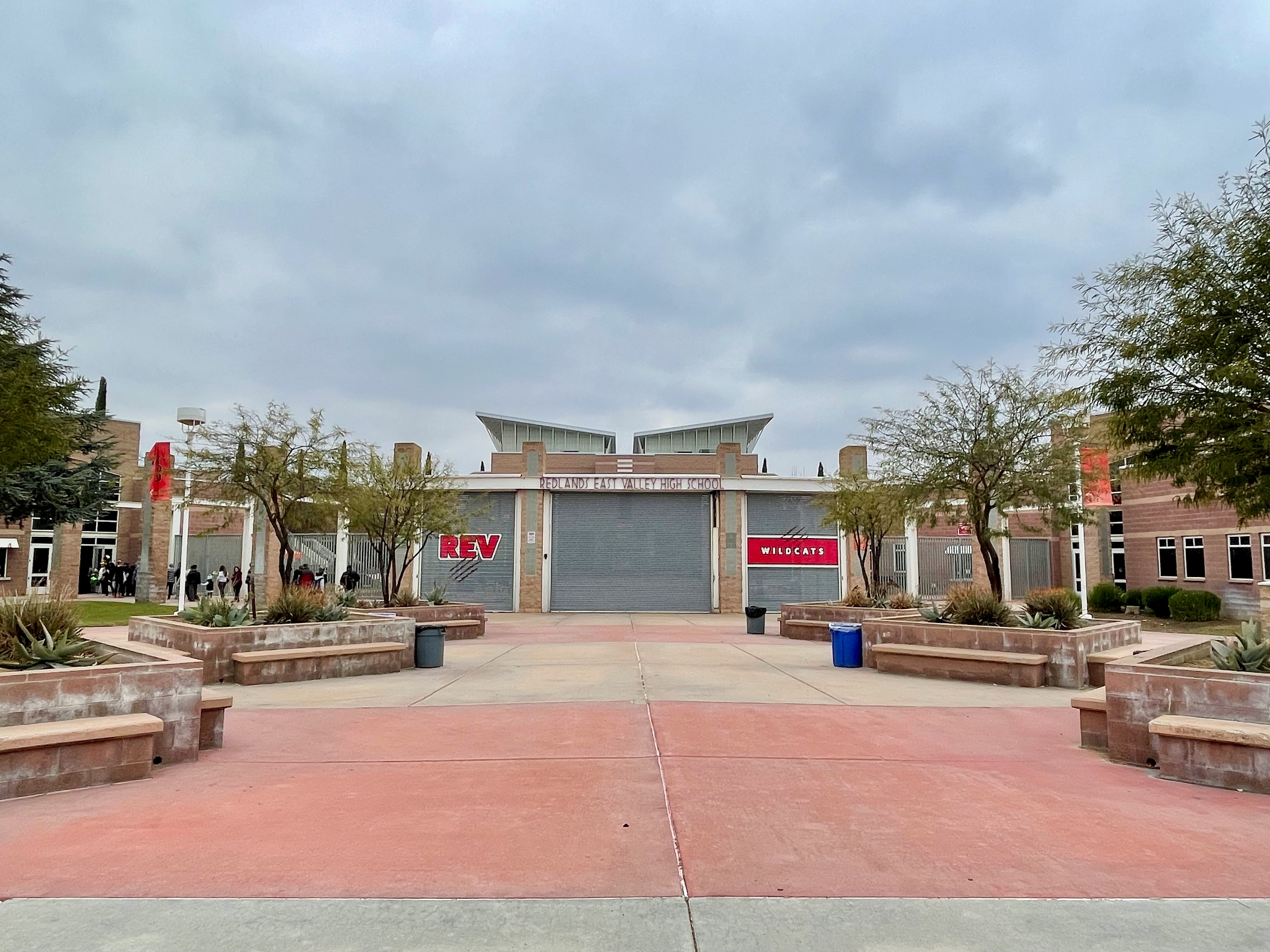
Main gate in 2025

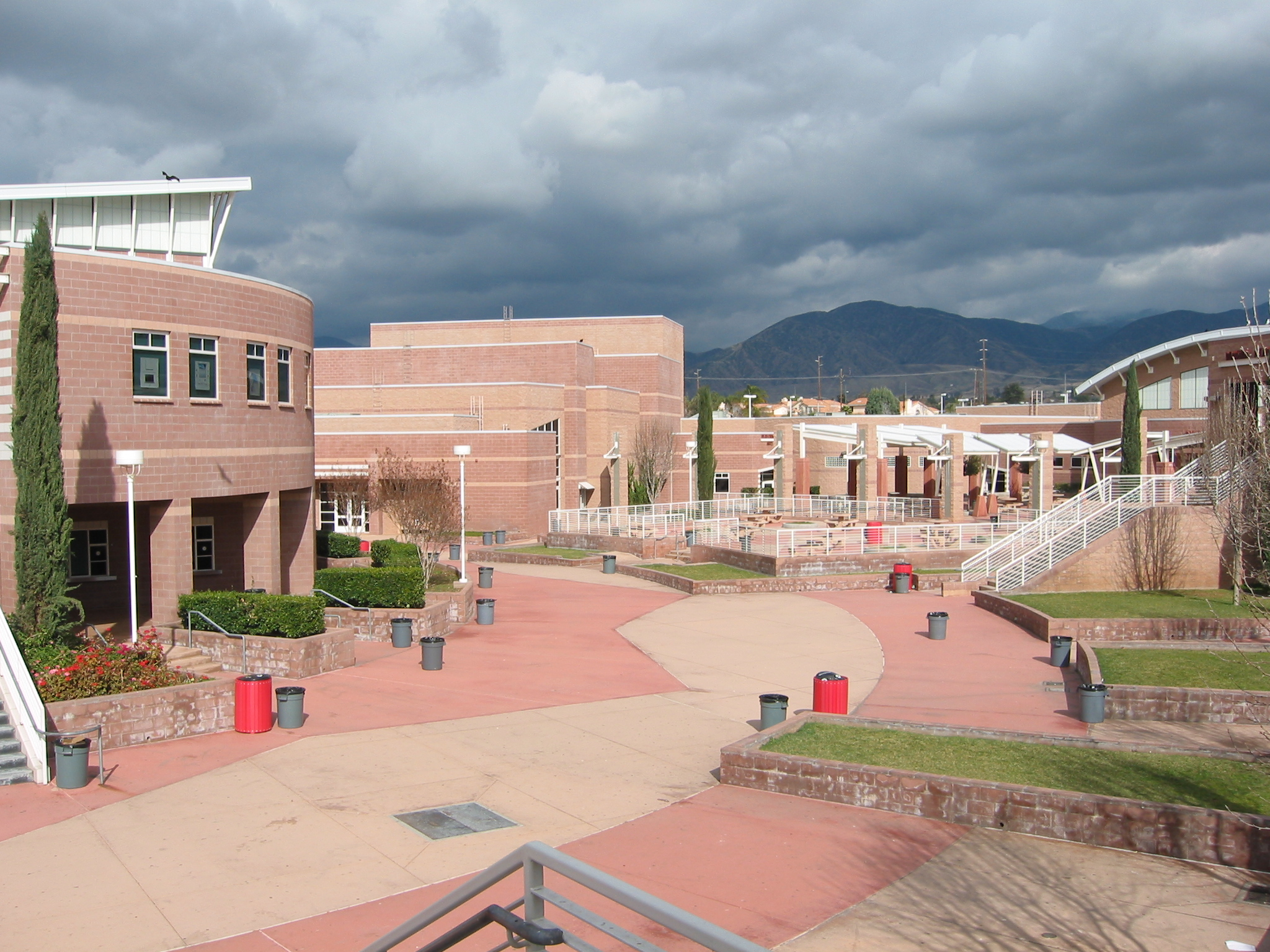
A view of the campus facing northeast in 2006.

Redlands East Valley is a 264,000-square-foot (24,500 m^{2}) comprehensive high school located on a 57-acre (230,000 m^{2}) sloping site, designed to house 2,500 students. An element in the design was a focus on the media center and its application of technology. The majority of the building exteriors are built with concrete masonry, exposed structural steel, glass, and metal roofs. The school colors and mascot were chosen to contrast cross-town rival Redlands High School, an example being how Redlands East Valley has a Wildcat and Redlands High has a Terrier.

The school cost US$35,000,000 (41 million 1995) to build and was completed in September 1997. The roof of the Media Center Library was designed to look like an opened book. The performing arts building was designed to look like a piano, complete with black and white tiles on the floor in the piano lab. The Performing Arts Theater is named in honor of Harry Blackstone Jr., a stage magician who lived in Redlands. The school offers the Advanced Placement program.

== Sports ==
=== Football ===
The Redlands East Valley Wildcats play in the Citrus Belt League. Under then head coach Kurt Bruich, the football team has at one point been positioned #2 in the state and #17 in the nation, and has gone to state championship as well. With REV's victory over the Citrus Hill Hawks on November 28, 2014, the school became the first in the district since 1979 to reach the CIF finals. On December 5, 2014, Redlands East Valley football won their first CIF championship and two weeks after, the school won their first state championship, defeating Clayton Valley Charter High School in the Division II championship.

=== Wrestling ===
The REV wrestling team was the first boys team in school history to win a CIF title as well as the first team to ever win an individual state title. In 2010 the boys wrestling team became REV's first boys CIF champions. In 2011 Redlands East Valley Wrestler Chris Mecate became the school's first ever individual CIF state champion.

== Notable alumni ==
- Matt Andriese, baseball player
- Landon Donovan, soccer player
- Tyler Chatwood, baseball player
- Kylie Fitts, American football player
- Ronnie Fouch, American college football player
- Tommy Hanson, baseball player
- Jaelan Phillips, American football player
- Chris Polk, American football player
- Lil Xan, American rapper (dropped out)
- Gary Walker (defensive back), American football player
