= Dick Bruich =

American football coach

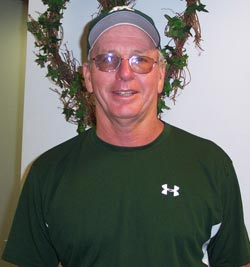
- Born: 1947 (age 78–79); Kearney, Nebraska
- Spouse: Cathy Cendejas (1968–present)

Richard Bruich is an American retired high school football coach. He led two different Southern California high school football programs to championships. His overall prep head coaching record is 292–84–4.

== Personal life ==
Bruich was born in Kearney, Nebraska in 1947 to Anton and Rita Bruich. The family moved to Pico Rivera, California in 1959. Bruich attended and played football for Cantwell High School, graduating in 1965. In 1968 he married Cathy Cendejas. Married for over 50 years, the couple has raised three children, Kristen, Kyle, and Kurt, all of whom have gone on to become educators. Kurt is also a successful head football coach at Citrus Valley High School in Redlands, California.

== Early coaching career ==
In 1966, while attending college at Los Angeles State University, he took an assistant coaching job at his alma mater, Cantwell High School. He subsequently moved on to another assistant coaching job at Pius X High School, and then in 1969 he joined the staff at St. Paul High School in Santa Fe Springs, California, where he was named the defensive coordinator. During his tenure, the team won the CIF and state championship in 1972 under head coach Marijon Ancich.

== Fontana High School ==
In 1975 Bruich joined the staff at Fontana High School as defensive coordinator and assistant head coach, under head coach John Tyree. The Steelers reached the CIF Division 4A title game in 1976, but lost. In 1977 Bruich succeeded Tyree as head coach of the Fontana High School football program. During his 22-year tenure Fontana won the 1987 National Championship, two state championships, two CIF championships, one CIF runner-up, four CIF semi-final appearances, twelve Citrus League titles, and twenty-two consecutive playoff berths.

== Kaiser High School ==
In 1999, the Fontana Unified School District opened Henry J. Kaiser High School. Bruich moved to the new school and began building a team. Before retiring in 2009, he led Kaiser to a state championship, two CIF championships, one CIF runner-up, two CIF semi-final appearances, eight Sunkist League titles, and eight consecutive playoff berths.

== Championships ==
20 league championships in football (4 CIF and 3 State) and one national championship.

== Notable players ==
Reuben Henderson, defensive back, Chicago Bears (1981–82) and San Diego Chargers (1983–84)

Lonyae Miller, running back, Dallas Cowboys (2009–2013)

R.J. Soward, receiver, Jacksonville Jaguars (2000), Toronto Argonauts (CFL) (2004–06)

Jason Shirley, offensive lineman, Cincinnati Bengals (2008–2012)

David Carter, defensive lineman, Arizona Cardinals (2011–2015)

Chris Carter, linebacker, Pittsburgh Steelers (2011–2017)

== Coaching awards ==
- Coach of the Year CIF SS in 1987, 1989, 2002 and 2003;
- California State Coach of the Year in 1989;
- Coach of the Year, San Bernardino Sun in 1979, 1984, 1987, 1988, and 1992;
- Coach of the Decade, San Bernardino Sun in 2000;
- Coach of the Year, Inland Valley Daily Bulletin in 1979, 1984, 1987, 1989, and 2002;
- Coach of the Year, Riverside Press Enterprise in 1989 and 2002;

== Halls of Fame ==
- Inland Valley Classic,
- California Coaches Association,
- Southern California Interscholastic Football Coaches Association,
- National High School Athletic Coaches Association,
- National Football Foundation;
- CIF Southern Section

== Community recognition ==
- City of Fontana Wall of Fame
- February 18, 2003 was proclaimed "Dick Bruich Day" in the City of Fontana.
