= Marijon Ancich =

American football coach (1937–2018)

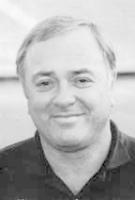

Biographical details
- Born: 1937; Yugoslavia
- Died: December 8, 2018; Los Angeles County, California, U.S.
- Education: Cal Poly (1961); Azusa Pacific (1980)

Playing career
- 1958–1961: Cal Poly
- Positions: Fullback, defensive back, linebacker

Coaching career (HC unless noted)
- 1960: St. Paul HS (assistant)
- 1961–1981: St. Paul HS (CA)
- 1982: Northern Arizona (OC)
- 1983: Cerritos College (DC)
- 1984–1992: Tustin HS (CA)
- 1993–2005: St. Paul HS (CA)
- 2006-2007: Cerritos (DC)
- 2008: Villa Park HS (CA) (assistant)
- 2009–2012: St. Paul HS (CA)

Head coaching record
- Overall: 360–141–10

Accomplishments and honors

Championships
- 1 national (1972); 2 California: (1968, 1972); 3 CIF-SS (1968, 1972, 1981)

Awards
- National Sports News Service National High School Football Coach of the Year (1981); Los Angeles Times Orange County Coach of the Year (1990); National High School Hall of Fame (1999); NFL/KABC High School Coach of the Year Award (2000); Cal Poly SLO Hall of Fame (2004); San Pedro Sports Walk of Fame Trani Award (2004); American Red Cross Hometown Heroes Meaningful Mentor (Rio Hondo chapter, 2012)

Marijon Ancich (1937 – December 8, 2018) was an American football coach. Known as the "John Wooden of (American) high school coaches" and often called the Dean of high school coaches, he is the second-winningest high school football coach in California history with a record of 360–141–10, behind Bob Ladouceur of De La Salle High School in Concord, California with 399 wins. In his long career, Ancich's teams won three California Interscholastic Federation (CIF) titles, two California state titles and 19 league championships.

== Personal life ==
Born in Yugoslavia, Marijon Ancich and his family fled to the United States during World War II. Initially arriving in New York City, the Ancich family settled in Southern California seven years later. He attended San Pedro High School, graduating in 1955. He then attended Cal Poly, San Luis Obispo and was a four-year letterman in football and a two-year letterman in track. In football, he played fullback, linebacker, and defensive back, and was a two-time All-CCAA selection. Ancich and his wife Jacquie have seven children.

In addition to coaching, Ancich was a longshoreman for 49 years. The coaches who worked for him were told that their free time was between midnight and 6:00 am and that any normal human did not need more than a few hours of sleep each night thereby earning the nickname of "Red-Eye." Players often referred to him as just "The Eye" because he seemed to know what any given player was doing on any given play. He always gave credit to the parents, players, and fellow coaches for his accomplishments.

In late 2000, Ancich summed up his objective for every player: "To give the young man the opportunity to develop his courage, his loyalty, his poise, the proper weighing of values and the proper control of his emotions in adversity, and in accomplishment."

== Coaching career ==
=== St. Paul High School ===
"Coach A" is carried on the shoulders of his players following St. Paul's victory in the 1972 CIF Southern Section 4-A Division Championship.

After college, Ancich began his coaching career in 1960 as a varsity football assistant at St. Paul High School in Santa Fe Springs, California. After being elevated to head coach just a year later, he began an association with the St. Paul football program that would ultimately span across six decades. From 1961 to 1981, Ancich led the Swordsmen to a remarkable level of gridiron success, earning 10 outright Angelus League titles (while sharing in three more) and qualifying for the playoffs 16 times, including 15 straight appearances from 1967 through 1981. St. Paul shared the CIF Southern Section's 4-A Division title with El Rancho in 1968, then defeated Western to win it outright in 1972. The Swordsmen finished as runners-up in 1975 and 1977 before Ancich clinched his third and final CIF championship in 1981 by defeating Colton High School for the Big-Five Conference title to complete a 14-0 season. Ancich recorded 186 wins, 38 losses, and six ties over 21 seasons, including a 26-13-1 record in the postseason.

=== Northern Arizona University ===
Ancich resigned as head football coach at St. Paul to take on the role of offensive coordinator under new Lumberjacks head coach Joe Harper. Northern Arizona went 4-7 in the 1982 season, after which Ancich departed the program.

=== Cerritos College ===
Returning to Southern California, Ancich joined the staff of head coach Frank Mazzotta at Cerritos College, this time as defensive coordinator. In 1983, the Falcons defeated Saddleback College 34-17 in the Orange County Pony Bowl to finish with a 9-2 record and a No. 2 national ranking.

=== Tustin High School ===
From 1984 to 1992, Ancich was varsity football head coach at Tustin High School, a program that had won only three games in the previous two seasons before his arrival. Under Ancich, the Tillers became a contender, earning five CIF Southern Section playoff appearances and three Sea View League titles. Tustin reached the CIF-SS Division VI championship game for two consecutive seasons (1990 and 1991), losing both times. In nine seasons as Tillers head coach, Ancich compiled a record of 65 wins, 37 losses, and two ties.

=== St. Paul High School (second stint) ===
In 1993, Ancich was asked to return to St. Paul High School as head coach of the varsity football program. Over the next 13 seasons, he helped lead the Swordsmen to an overall record of 93 victories, 52 losses, and two ties. His best season came in 1998 when St. Paul reached the CIF-SS Division III championship game where the Swordsmen lost 17-14 to the Indians of Hart High School. When Ancich stepped down following the 2005 season, he had become California's all-time winningest football coach with a combined record of 344-127-10.

=== Cerritos College (second stint) ===
Ancich returned to Cerritos to again serve as defensive coordinator under Mazzotta. In two seasons, the Falcons were 7-12 overall.

=== Villa Park High School ===
Ancich spent one season as an assistant coach under his son Dusan Ancich, then in his first year as head coach of Villa Park High School in Orange County. The Spartans went 4-6 in 2008.

=== St. Paul High School (third stint) ===
Ancich returned one more time to the St. Paul football program as varsity head coach in 2009. In three seasons, Ancich's teams compiled a record of 16-14 but did not advance to the postseason during this period. Stepping down as Swordsmen head coach for the third and final time following the 2011 season, Ancich compiled a record of 295-104-8 at St. Paul over 37 total seasons.

=== Controversies ===
In 1974, a trio of St. Paul assistant coaches were found to be illegally scouting a football practice at Pioneer High School in Whittier. Ancich, who had no knowledge of his staff's activity and did not authorize it, suspended all three assistants immediately. The teams faced off against each other in the first round of the 4-A Division playoffs with St. Paul winning on the field 44-8. But Pioneer launched a successful protest with the CIF Southern Section office and the Swordsmen were forced to forfeit the game, ending their season with a 7-2-1 record.

In 2010, Coach Ancich and other members of his staff were placed on an administrative leave after a hazing scandal that allegedly victimized several players at St. Paul High School.

On August 19, 2010, almost the entire football coaching staff at St. Paul, including Ancich, were suspended by the school for more than a week while it and the Archdiocese of Los Angeles investigated a hazing incident.

The team had been coached in the interim by offensive coordinator Visko Ancich – Marijon's son – and defensive backs coach Rich Avina Jr., who were among those originally suspended but cleared and reinstated. Suspensions for the rest of the coaches lasted eight days while the investigation was going on.

The incident took place on Aug. 14 in the locker room. According to a letter from principal Kate Aceves, Marijon and Visko Ancich, Avina, Lou Cabral, Oliver Cepeida, Rich Estrella and Anthony Wilson were "not found culpable of any knowledge of the incident."

One coach was not reinstated, and it was reported that it was believed to be Juan Gonzalez, who had coached freshmen for four seasons and was promoted to varsity for 2010. Aceves said that one coach's contract was not renewed "because of a personnel issue." She did confirm that an incident took place, but didn't expand, other than to say the majority of the football team "had some sort of involvement whether as a witness or participant."

=== Championship games ===
1968
St. Paul faced El Rancho in the CIF Southern Section 4-A Division final played at the Los Angeles Memorial Coliseum. The Swordsmen under Ancich held the heavily-favored Dons to a 20–20 tie, and as CIF rules at the time did not permit an overtime period, El Rancho and St. Paul went into the record books as 4-A Division and state co-champions.
1972
St. Paul, which had lost to Bishop Amat 19–6 in a hotly contested Angelus League game in 1971, came back in 1972 to return the favor, winning the league title and going all the way back to the CIF-SS 4-A title game, where they faced undefeated Western. The top-ranked Swordsmen beat the Pioneers 29–24 at the Coliseum for Ancich's first undisputed CIF state championship.
1975
St. Paul returned to the 4-A Division title game at the Coliseum in 1975 - its third title-game appearance in eight years - but the Swordsmen lost a 14-13 heartbreaker to Loyola on a missed extra-point late in the fourth quarter.
1977
St. Paul survives a sudden death tiebreaker against South Hills in the quarterfinal round en route to the Big-Five Conference finals against Los Altos at Anaheim Stadium where the Swordsmen came up short versus the Conquerors 15–22.
1981
The Swordsmen won the Big-Five Conference title in 1981 with a 30–9 victory over Colton in front of 29,728 fans at Anaheim Stadium and finished the season with a 14–0 record.
1990
Ancich gets Tustin High School into the championship game for Division VI, bringing in a record of 13–0. This is the first time since 1933 that the Tillers have reached a CIF Southern Section final. They lost to Sunny Hills 7–3 in front of 11,000 at Orange Coast College. An unprecedented seven St. Paul players receive First Team All-CIF honors.
1991
The Tillers reach the Division VI championship game for the second straight year, despite returning only two starters from the previous season. They lose again, this time 27-7 to the Valencia Tigers.
1998
In the Division III championship game, Hart High School intercepted a pass on their own 5-yard line with 21 seconds left to preserve a 17–14 victory against St. Paul. Hart was led by eventual Cal and NFL quarterback Kyle Boller.

=== Final Game ===
On Saturday, June 23, 2012, Coach Marijon Ancich was at the helm for his last football game as a coach representing St. Paul High School. Ancich was chosen to coach in the 2nd annual Arizona vs. Southern California All-Star Game in Surprise, Arizona.

==The Coaches' Coach==

Many of Ancich's former players and assistants have become coaches or head coaches, from high school football to College to the National Football League, including Jeff Veeder, Kurt Westling of Aliso Niguel High School in Aliso Viejo, Dick Bruich of Fontana Kaiser High School, Frank Mazzotta of La Habra High School, Robert Oviedo of Wilson High School in Hacienda Heights, Anthony Wilson of John Glenn High School in Norwalk, Pat Degnan of Quartz Hill High School, Dusan Ancich (son) of Villa Park High School, Visko Ancich (son) of Whittier High School, Richard Smith of the NFL Houston Texans, Tim Lins of Moorpark High School, and former Cal State Northridge and Temescal Canyon High School coach Bob Burt along with Mike LaneveChicago Christian High School highlighted with being named Coach Of the Year by The Daily Southtown News, 1997/ . A "Family Tree" printed in the St. Paul program lists 116 coaches who either played or coached for Ancich.

== Personal life and death ==
Marijon Ancich suffered a stroke on November 29, 2018, and was transferred to hospice care. He died on December 8, 2018.
