= Paul Carr (American football) =

American football player (1931–2006)

No. 57
- Positions: Linebacker, defensive back

Personal information
- Born: September 4, 1931; El Monte, California, U.S.
- Died: February 18, 2006 (aged 74); Onalaska, Texas, U.S.
- Listed height: 6 ft 0 in (1.83 m)
- Listed weight: 205 lb (93 kg)

Career information
- High school: Citrus (Fontana, California)
- College: Houston
- NFL draft: 1953: 7th round, 83rd overall pick

Career history
- San Francisco 49ers (1955–1957)

Career NFL statistics
- Interceptions: 3
- Stats at Pro Football Reference

Paul Howard Carr (September 4, 1931 - February 18, 2006) was an American professional football player who played in the National Football League (NFL) for the San Francisco 49ers from 1955 to 1957 for a total of 30 career games.
