= Live Oak Elementary =

Live Oak Elementary may refer to one of the following elementary schools:

- Live Oak Elementary (Fontana), located in Fontana, California
- Live Oak Elementary (Watson), located in Watson, Louisiana
