= Nick Barnett =

American football player (born 1981)

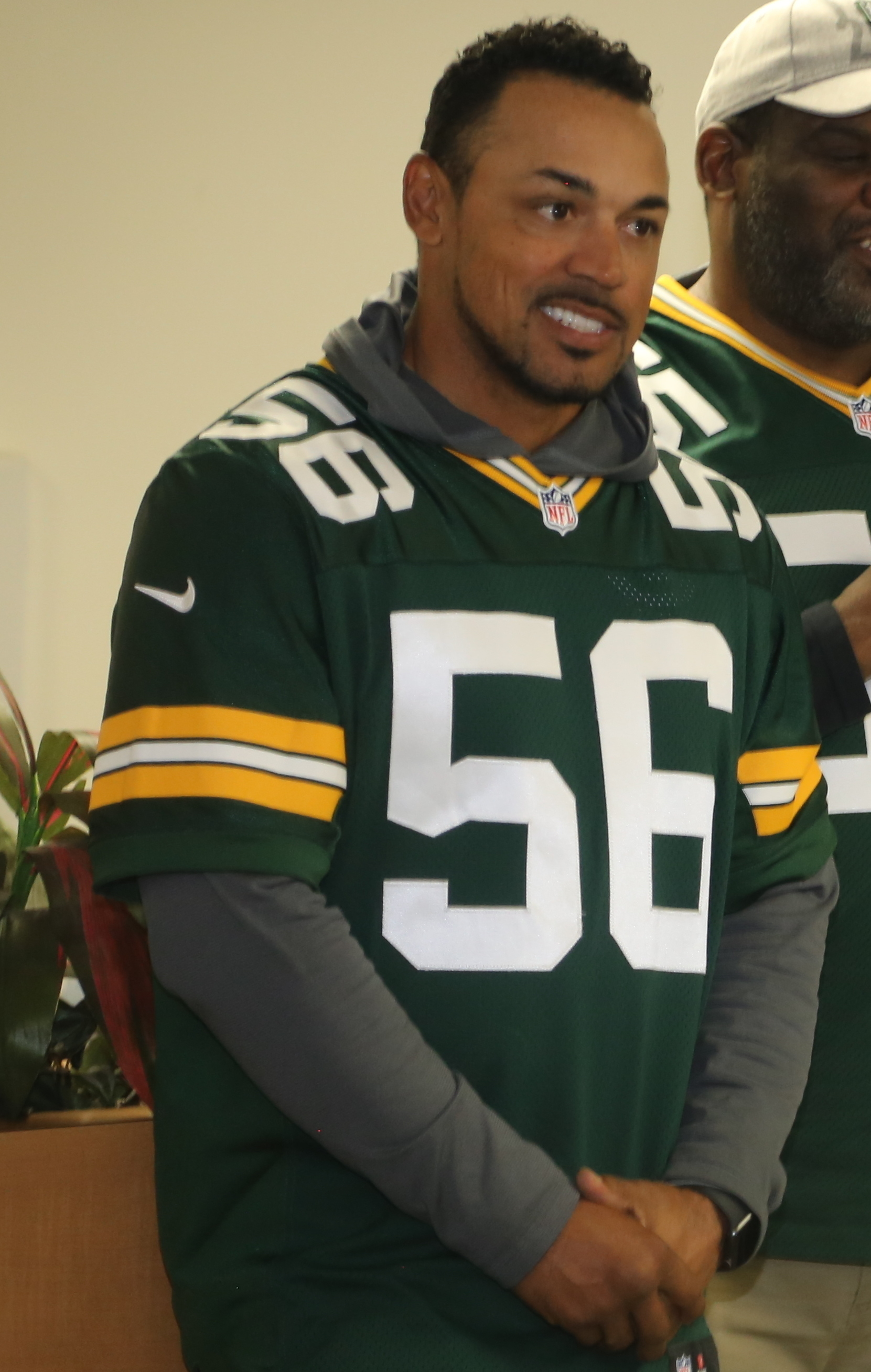
- Barnett at Fort McCoy, Wisconsin in 2019

No. 56, 50, 55
- Position: Linebacker

Personal information
- Born: May 27, 1981 (age 45); Fontana, California, U.S.
- Listed height: 6 ft 2 in (1.88 m)
- Listed weight: 228 lb (103 kg)

Career information
- High school: Miller (Fontana)
- College: Oregon State
- NFL draft: 2003: 1st round, 29th overall pick

Career history
- Green Bay Packers (2003–2010); Buffalo Bills (2011–2012); Washington Redskins (2013)

Awards and highlights
- Super Bowl champion (XLV); Second-team All-Pro (2007); PFWA All-Rookie Team (2003); First-team All-Pac-10 (2002)

Career NFL statistics
- Total tackles: 1,041
- Sacks: 20.5
- Forced fumbles: 6
- Fumble recoveries: 7
- Interceptions: 12
- Defensive touchdowns: 2
- Stats at Pro Football Reference

Nicholas Alexander Barnett (born May 27, 1981) is an American former professional football player who was a linebacker in the National Football League (NFL). He played college football for the Oregon State Beavers, and was selected by the Green Bay Packers in the first round of the 2003 NFL draft. He played professionally for the Packers, Buffalo Bills and Washington Redskins. Sidelined by an injury, he was unable to play with the Packers during their Super Bowl XLV win against the Pittsburgh Steelers.

== Early life ==
Barnett was born in Barstow, California and attended Fontana A.B. Miller High School in Fontana, California.

== College career ==
Barnett attended Oregon State University, where he was a four-year letter winner for the Oregon State Beavers football team (1999–2002), starting the last three seasons at strong side linebacker. As a senior, Barnett was a first-team All-Pacific-10 Conference selection. He led the conference in tackles with 121 (62 solo). Barnett registered his single game best against the University of California in 2001 with 18 tackles (11 solo).

He majored in Business Administration and Communications.

=== College statistics ===
Year	Team	GP	GS	TK	SO	AS	FR	FC	INT	TFL	PBU	SCK	PRES
1999	Oregon State Beavers	12	0	11	6	5	0-0	0	0-0	0-0	0	0.0-0	0
2000	Oregon State Beavers	12	5	44	34	10	2–9	0	0-0	3–4	1	0.0-0	0
2001	Oregon State Beavers	11	11	73	41	32	0-0	1	1–0	6-20	4	2.0-11	5
2002	Oregon State Beavers	13	13	121	62	59	0-0	2	0-0	21–72	7	6.0-43	1
Total		48	29	249	143	106	2–9	3	1–0	30–96	12	8.0-54	6

== Professional career ==
Pre-draft measurables
Height	Weight	Arm length	Hand span	40-yard dash	10-yard split	20-yard split	20-yard shuttle	Three-cone drill	Vertical jump	Broad jump	Bench press
6 ft 1 5/8 in (1.87 m)	236 lb (107 kg)	32 1/4 in (0.82 m)	9 1/2 in (0.24 m)	4.69 s	1.65 s	2.75 s	4.08 s	7.00 s	34.5 in (0.88 m)	10 ft 3 in (3.12 m)	32 reps
All values from NFL Combine

=== Green Bay Packers ===
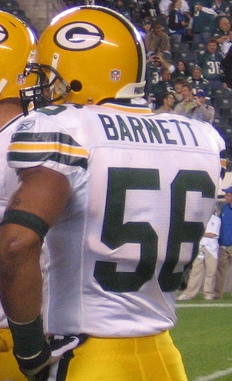
Barnett with the Packers in 2006

The Green Bay Packers selected Barnett in the first round (29th overall) of the 2003 NFL draft. Barnett was the third linebacker drafted in 2003, behind Terrell Suggs (10th overall) and Calvin Pace (18th overall).

On July 19, 2003, the Packers signed Barnett to five-year, $6 million contract that includes a signing bonus of $3.21 million. Barnett entered training camp as the 'de facto' starting middle linebacker, replacing Hardy Nickerson. Head coach Mike Sherman named Barnett the starting middle linebacker to begin his rookie season. He started alongside outside linebackers Hannibal Navies and Na'il Diggs.

He made his professional regular season debut and first career start during the Green Bay Packers' season-opener against the Minnesota Vikings and made five combined tackles (one solo) during their 30–25 loss. On September 14, 2003, Barnett collected a season-high 14 combined tackles (12 solo), deflected one pass, and made his first career interception during a 31–6 victory against the Detroit Lions in Week 2. Barnett intercepted a pass by Lions' quarterback Joey Harrington, that was originally intended for tight end Mikhael Ricks, and returned it for a 13-yard gain during the fourth quarter. In Week 4, he made four combined tackles (three solo) and made his first career sack on Bears' quarterback Kordell Stewart for a five-yard loss during the first quarter of a 38–23 victory at the Chicago Bears. Barnett was inactive for the Packers' Week 13 loss at the Detroit Lions after sustaining an ankle injury during a 20–10 win against the San Francisco 49ers the previous week. He finished his rookie season in 2003 with 112 combined tackle (86 solo), three pass deflections, three interceptions, and two sacks in 15 games and 15 starts.

The Packers finished first in the NFC North with a 10–6 record in 2003. On January 4, 2004, Barnett started in his first career playoff game and made six combined tackles (three solo) during a 33–27 overtime victory against the Seattle Seahawks during the NFC Wildcard Game. The following week, he made five solo tackles and defended two passes as the Packers lost 20–17 at the Philadelphia Eagles during the NFC Divisional Round and were eliminated from the playoffs.

On April 10, 2007, Barnett signed a six-year contract extension worth $34.85 million.

Barnett missed the second half of the 2008 season after suffering a torn knee ligament during November 9's game against the Minnesota Vikings.

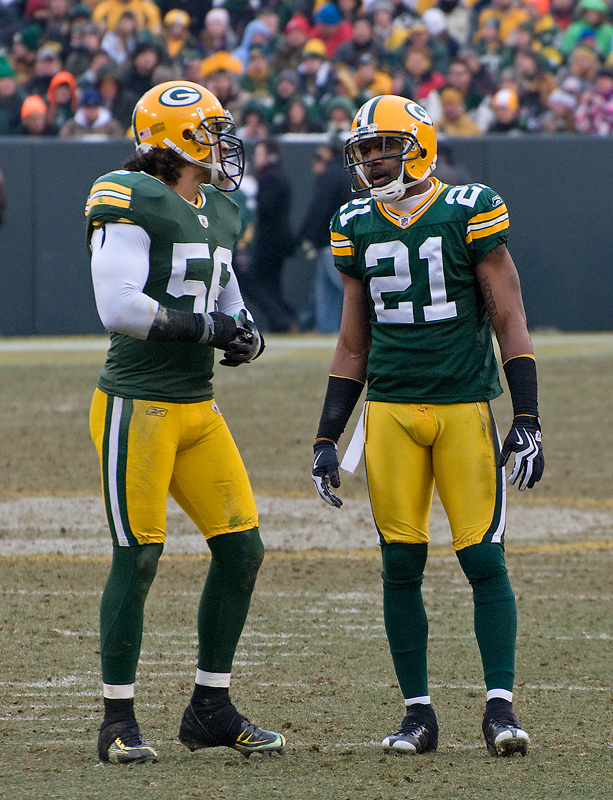
Nick Barnett and Charles Woodson at Lambeau Field.

Barnett suffered a season-ending wrist injury in a Week 4 matchup vs. the Detroit Lions. He was put on injured reserve on October 7, 2010. It was the second time in three seasons that Barnett ended his season on injured reserve. As of 2018 Barnett is third in all-time tackles for the Green Bay Packers. Barnett was released on July 28, after Green Bay was unable to find a trade.

=== Buffalo Bills ===
Barnett signed a three-year, $12 million deal with the Buffalo Bills on July 31, 2011. On February 11, 2013, the Bills announced that Barnett would be released from his contract along with safety George Wilson.

=== Washington Redskins ===
On July 31, 2013, Barnett agreed to a one-year deal with the Washington Redskins. He switched from the outside to inside linebacker position for the Redskins' defensive scheme. On December 24, he was placed on injured reserve after suffering a MCL sprain in the Week 16 game against the Dallas Cowboys.

=== Professional statistics ===
Year	Team	G	TTkl	Solo	Ast	Sacks	Int	Yds	Avg	Lg	TD	Pass Def	FF	FR
2003	Green Bay Packers	15	112	86	26	2	3	21	7	14	0	3	0	1
2004	Green Bay Packers	16	123	92	31	3	1	16	16	16	0	5	0	1
2005	Green Bay Packers	16	138	91	47	1	1	95	95	95	1	1	1	3
2006	Green Bay Packers	15	105	62	43	2	2	3	1.5	3	0	7	0	1
2007	Green Bay Packers	16	131	102	29	3.5	2	40	20	38	0	4	0	1
2008	Green Bay Packers	9	49	41	8	0	0	0	0	0	0	2	1	0
2009	Green Bay Packers	16	105	82	23	4	0	0	0	0	0	7	0	0
2010	Green Bay Packers	4	24	19	5	0	0	0	0	0	0	1	0	0
2011	Buffalo Bills	16	130	78	52	3	3	80	27	33	1	5	1	0
2012	Buffalo Bills	16	112	72	40	2	0	0	0	0	0	1	3	0
2013	Washington Redskins	14	12	7	5	0	0	0	0	0	0	0	0	0
Total		137	1041	732	309	20.5	12	255	21	95	2	35	3	7

== Personal life ==
Barnett married his wife Amanda (nee: Langston) at Lambeau Field in 2008.

== Coaching career ==
Barnett became the head coach at Del Norte High School in San Diego, California, in 2023. In his first season there, the team won the Division II CIF San Diego Section championship off of an 11-2 record. It was the first football championship in school history.

Barnett and his wife, Amanda, co-founded Praxis Elite Sports Academy, a private middle school for student-athletes in San Diego.
