= Malik Flowers =

American football player (born 1999)

Profile
- Position: Wide receiver

Personal information
- Born: June 23, 1999 (age 27); Fontana, California, U.S.
- Listed height: 5 ft 11 in (1.80 m)
- Listed weight: 200 lb (91 kg)

Career information
- High school: A. B. Miller (Fontana, California)
- College: Montana (2017–2022)
- NFL draft: 2023: undrafted

Career history
- New Orleans Saints (2023)*; Seattle Seahawks (2023)*; Edmonton Elks (2023); Las Vegas Raiders (2023)*; Edmonton Elks (2024)
- * Offseason or practice squad member only

Awards and highlights
- First-team All-Big Sky (2021); Second-team All-Big Sky (2022); Third-team All-Big Sky (2018)

Career CFL statistics
- Receptions: 3
- Targets: 8
- Receiving yards: 33
- Receiving touchdowns: 0
- Stats at CFL.ca
- Stats at Pro Football Reference

Malik Flowers (born June 23, 1999) is an American football wide receiver. He played college football at Montana.

== Early life ==
Flowers grew up in Fontana, California and attended A. B. Miller High School. He committed to play college football at FCS Montana over offers from FBS programs Cincinnati and Colorado State.

== College career ==
Flowers was a member of the Montana Grizzlies for five seasons and redshirted his true freshman year.

During the 2018 season, he played in 11 games and was named on the Phil Steele Magazine's second-team Freshman All-American, the Third-team All Big Sky and the Co-recipient of the Hauck Family Special Teams Players of the Year Award. He finished the season with 607 kick return yards and one touchdown on 22 attempts.

During the 2019 season, he played in and started all 14 games as the team's returner and was named on the Phil Steele Magazine second-team All-American, the HERO Sports first-team sophomore All-American, the ROOT Sports Big Sky Special Teams Player of the Week after his Week 4 game performance against Monmouth, the Phil Steele Magazine Preseason third-team All-Big Sky and he set the new program record with 882 kick return yards.

During the 2020 season, he played in both two games and was named on the College Football America's 2020 FCS Starting Lineup. He finished the season with 70 kick return yards on two attempts.

During the 2021 season, he played in 12 games and was named the Hauck Family Special Teams Player of the Year, the HERO Sports and Phil Steele Second-Team All-America kick returner, the STATS FCS Third-Team All-America kick returner, the First Team All-Big Sky kick returner, on the Preseason All-Big Sky, on the Phil Steele 1st-team Preseason All-America, on the Phil Steele 1st-team Preseason All-Big Sky, the Athlon Sports Preseason All-America, the HERO Sports Preseason All-American team and on the HERO Sports Preseason All-Big Sky. He finished the season with 488 kick return yards and two touchdowns on 16 attempts.

During the 2022 season, he played in all 13 games and set the NCAA record for having seven kick return touchdowns, earned the second-team FCS All-America honors from Stats Perform and Phil Steele Magazine and was named on the second-team All Big Sky. He finished the season with 615 kick return yards and two touchdowns on 20 attempts.

== Professional career ==
Pre-draft measurables
Height	Weight	Arm length	Hand span	Wingspan	40-yard dash	10-yard split	20-yard split	20-yard shuttle	Three-cone drill	Vertical jump	Broad jump	Bench press
5 ft 11 3/8 in (1.81 m)	193 lb (88 kg)	32 3/8 in (0.82 m)	8 1/4 in (0.21 m)	6 ft 3 1/4 in (1.91 m)	4.52 s	1.58 s	2.60 s	4.38 s	7.13 s	34.0 in (0.86 m)	10 ft 0 in (3.05 m)	12 reps
All values from NFL Combine/Pro Day

=== New Orleans Saints ===
Flowers was signed by the New Orleans Saints as an undrafted free agent on May 2, 2023. He was released by New Orleans on June 15.

=== Seattle Seahawks ===
Flowers was signed by the Seattle Seahawks on August 22, 2023. He was waived by the Seahawks as part of preliminary roster cuts on August 27.

=== Edmonton Elks ===
On September 18, 2023, Flowers was signed to the Edmonton Elks of the Canadian Football League. He was released by the Elks on October 10.

=== Las Vegas Raiders ===
On October 11, 2023, Flowers was signed to the Las Vegas Raiders' practice squad. He was released by the Raiders on October 17.

=== Edmonton Elks (second stint) ===
On February 1, 2024, Flowers was re-signed to the Edmonton Elks. After playing in the first two games of the Elks' season in June, Flowers was released on July 7.
