= Eric Birch High School =

- Barons

Location
- 7930 Locust Ave. Fontana, California 92336; United States

Information
- Type: Public school
- Established: September 1994
- School district: Fontana Unified School District
- Principal: Mike Bunten
- Teaching staff: 19.77 (FTE)
- Student to teacher ratio: 14.77
- Color
- Mascot: Baron
- Website: birch.fusd.net

Eric Birch High School is located at 7930 Locust Avenue in Fontana, California. It has been open since September 1994. The current principal is Mike Bunten.
