= Josh Shirley =

American football player (born 1992)

No. 91, 46
- Position: Linebacker

Personal information
- Born: January 4, 1992 (age 34); Fontana, California, U.S.
- Listed height: 6 ft 1 in (1.85 m)
- Listed weight: 240 lb (109 kg)

Career information
- High school: Henry J. Kaiser (Fontana)
- College: Washington (2010–2013); UNLV (2014)
- NFL draft: 2015: undrafted

Career history
- Oakland Raiders (2015)*; Tampa Bay Buccaneers (2015); Oakland Raiders (2015)*; Seattle Seahawks (2016)*; Chicago Bears (2016); BC Lions (2017–2021)
- * Offseason or practice squad member only

Career NFL statistics
- Total tackles: 2
- Stats at Pro Football Reference
- Stats at CFL.ca

Joshua Christian Shirley (born January 4, 1992) is an American former professional football player who was a linebacker in the National Football League (NFL) and Canadian Football League (CFL). He played college football for the Washington Huskies before transferring to the UNLV Rebels.

== Professional career ==
=== Oakland Raiders (first stint) ===
Shirley was with the Oakland Raiders' practice squad for two weeks.

=== Tampa Bay Buccaneers ===
Shirley was signed to the Tampa Bay Buccaneers practice squad on October 6, 2015. He was promoted to the active roster on October 31, 2015. The team waived tackle Reid Fragel to make room for Shirley. On December 15, 2015, Shirley was released from the Buccaneers.

=== Oakland Raiders (second stint) ===
On December 17, 2015, it was announced Shirley would again be joining the Oakland Raiders practice squad.

=== Seattle Seahawks ===
On January 20, 2016, Shirley signed a futures contract with the Seattle Seahawks. On May 4, 2016, the Seahawks waived Shirley. On August 30, 2016, he was placed on injured reserve but was released on September 5, 2016.

=== Chicago Bears ===
On December 14, 2016 Shirley was signed to the Bears' practice squad. He was promoted to the active roster on December 31, 2016. He was released by the Bears on January 9, 2017.
