= Fontana High School =

Public secondary school in Fontana, California, United States

Coordinates: 34.1000°N 117.4667°W

Location
- 9453 Citrus Ave; Fontana, California 92335; United States

Information
- Type: Public school
- Motto: Steeler Pride
- Established: September 1952
- School district: Fontana Unified School District
- Principal: Joseph Malatesta
- Staff: 117.08 (FTE)
- Enrollment: 2,455 (2023–2024)
- Student to teacher ratio: 20.97
- Colors: Maroon and white
- Athletics conference: CIF Southern Section; Sunkist League
- Mascot: Steelers
- Website: fohi.fusd.net

Fontana High School (FOHI) is a secondary public school in Fontana, California in the Fontana Unified School District. Fontana High serves grades 9 through 12.

== History ==
A product of the Southern California post war boom, Fontana High (referred to locally as "FoHi") was completed in September 1952. The school was needed to serve the children of thousands of blue collar families from across the country who came to work at the Kaiser Steel plant – built just outside Fontana in the 1940s – and at the time the only steel production plant of its kind west of the Mississippi.

=== 2006 riot ===
In 2006, a fight between two students erupted into a riot of over 500 students at a school pep rally. Police fired bean bags and rubber pellets to scatter the crowd of students. The Fontana Police Department required assistance from other local law enforcement agencies (including the California Highway Patrol) after students threw rocks at responding officers, but the situation was ultimately resolved in under two hours. Six students were placed under arrest and thirty-four other students were suspended by the school district. There was no significant property damage or injuries, though a teacher was accidentally struck by a police bean bag round.

The high school used to be part of the Chaffey Joint Union High School District prior to 1955

== Demographics ==
Ethnic breakdown of the 4,073 students enrolled as of the 2007–2008 school year was:

85.8% Hispanic
6.9% White
4.8% African American
1% Asian
0.4% Other

== Football ==
Under coach Dick Bruich, the 1987 team was ranked the best in the nation. The Steeler football team was almost as well known for the traveling "rowdy" fanbase, which followed the team en masse throughout the season and into the playoffs. At home games, much of the town shut down as more than 8,000 maroon and white clad fans filled Steeler Stadium for matches with rival schools like Redlands, Pacific Eisenhower and Colton.

By the 1990s, the glory days for the team had faded. An economic downturn (the Kaiser Steel plant had shut down in 1983) and a continued population boom led to demographic shifts and classroom overcrowding. The addition of new high schools split the talent base and the team had a prolonged string of losing seasons.

== Notable alumni ==
- Travis Barker – known for snare drum in drumline and drummer for band Blink-182, Transplants, Box Car Racer, and +44
- Corey Benjamin – former NBA player, 1998 1st round draft pick of Chicago Bulls
- Greg Colbrunn – 13-year Major League Baseball player; member of 2001 World Series champion Arizona Diamondbacks, batting coach for 2013 World Series champion Boston Red Sox
- Sammy Hagar – attended Fontana; singer and former member of Van Halen
- Alan Harper – professional football player
- Reuben Henderson – 4-year NFL player, Chicago Bears and San Diego Chargers
- Pedro Nava – former California State Assemblyman from Santa Barbara, California. 2010 candidate for Attorney General
- Ante Razov – professional soccer player in MLS
- Sean Rooks – 12-year NBA player and former professional basketball coach
- Daryl Sconiers – professional baseball player
- R. Jay Soward – former USC Trojans football star and NFL first-round draft pick
- Jonathan Suárez – professional soccer player for Pumas Tabasco
- Robyn Leigh Tanguay – molecular toxicologist, Oregon State University
