= Jamaal Williams =

American football player (born 1995)

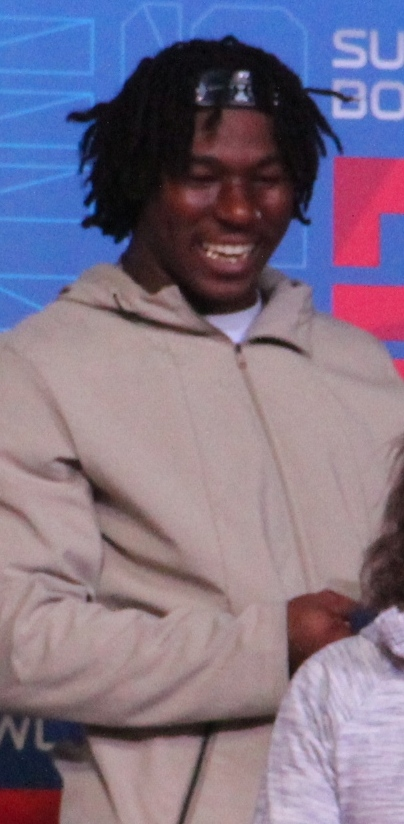
- Williams in 2019

Profile
- Position: Running back

Personal information
- Born: April 3, 1995 (age 31); Rialto, California, U.S.
- Listed height: 6 ft 0 in (1.83 m)
- Listed weight: 224 lb (102 kg)

Career information
- High school: Summit (Fontana, California)
- College: BYU (2012–2016)
- NFL draft: 2017: 4th round, 134th overall pick

Career history
- Green Bay Packers (2017–2020); Detroit Lions (2021–2022); New Orleans Saints (2023–2024)

Awards and highlights
- NFL rushing touchdowns leader (2022)

Career NFL statistics as of 2024
- Rushing yards: 4,122
- Rushing average: 3.9
- Rushing touchdowns: 32
- Receptions: 187
- Receiving yards: 1,310
- Receiving touchdowns: 8
- Stats at Pro Football Reference

Jamaal Malik Williams (born April 3, 1995) is an American professional football running back. He played college football for the BYU Cougars and was selected by the Green Bay Packers in the fourth round of the 2017 NFL draft.

== Early life ==
Williams attended Summit High School in Fontana, California where he played high school football for the Sky Hawks. A 3-star recruit, he committed to Brigham Young University (BYU) to play college football over an offer from Boise State.

== College career ==
Williams played at BYU from 2012 to 2016. On August 30, 2012, Williams made his collegiate debut with 15 rushing yards in the win over Washington State. On September 15, against Utah, he had his first collegiate rushing touchdown. On September 28, against Hawaii, he had 155 rushing yards and two rushing touchdowns. On October 13, against Oregon State, he added two more rushing touchdowns. On October 27, against Georgia Tech, he had 107 rushing yards, three rushing touchdowns, and three receptions for 54 yards and a touchdown. On November 10, against Idaho, he had 104 rushing yards and two rushing touchdowns. Overall, he finished the 2012 season with 775 rushing yards, 12 rushing touchdowns, 27 receptions, 315 receiving yards, and one receiving touchdown.

On August 31, 2013, in the season opener against Virginia, Williams had 144 rushing yards and 25 receiving yards. In the next game against Texas, he had 182 rushing yards in the victory. On October 25, against Boise State, he had 107 rushing yards and 24 receiving yards. On November 16, against the Idaho State Bengals, he had 131 rushing yards and three rushing touchdowns. On November 30, against Nevada, he had 219 rushing yards and a rushing touchdown. Overall, in the 2013 season, he finished with 1,233 rushing yards, seven rushing touchdowns, 18 receptions, and 125 receiving yards.

On September 6, 2014, against Texas, Williams had 89 rushing yards and twelve receiving yards in the victory. Five days later, against Houston, he had 139 rushing yards and two rushing touchdowns. On October 3, against Utah State, he had 102 rushing yards. He later suffered a knee injury and was sidelined for the remainder of the 2014 season. In his shortened season, he had 518 rushing yards, four rushing touchdowns, eight receptions, and 47 receiving yards.

Williams did not play in 2015 after withdrawing from the school, and redshirted.

Williams started his final collegiate season in 2016 with 163 rushing yards against Arizona. On September 24, against West Virginia, he had 169 rushing yards and two rushing touchdowns. On September 30, he rushed for a school-record 286 yards and five touchdowns on 29 carries during a 55–53 win over Toledo. In the next game, against Michigan State, he had 163 rushing yards and two rushing touchdowns. In his final college game, he was named the MVP of the 2016 Poinsettia Bowl after rushing for 210 yards and a touchdown against Wyoming. That red-shirt senior season, he had 1,375 yards on 234 carries for 12 touchdowns. During his career, he rushed for a school-record 3,901 yards on 726 carries with 35 touchdowns.

== Professional career ==
Pre-draft measurables
Height	Weight	Arm length	Hand span	40-yard dash	10-yard split	20-yard split	20-yard shuttle	Three-cone drill	Vertical jump	Broad jump	Bench press	Wonderlic
6 ft 0 3/8 in (1.84 m)	212 lb (96 kg)	31 1/4 in (0.79 m)	10 in (0.25 m)	4.53 s	1.61 s	2.62 s	4.26 s	7.12 s	33.0 in (0.84 m)	10 ft 3 in (3.12 m)	18 reps	20
All values are from NFL Combine/Pro Day

=== Green Bay Packers ===
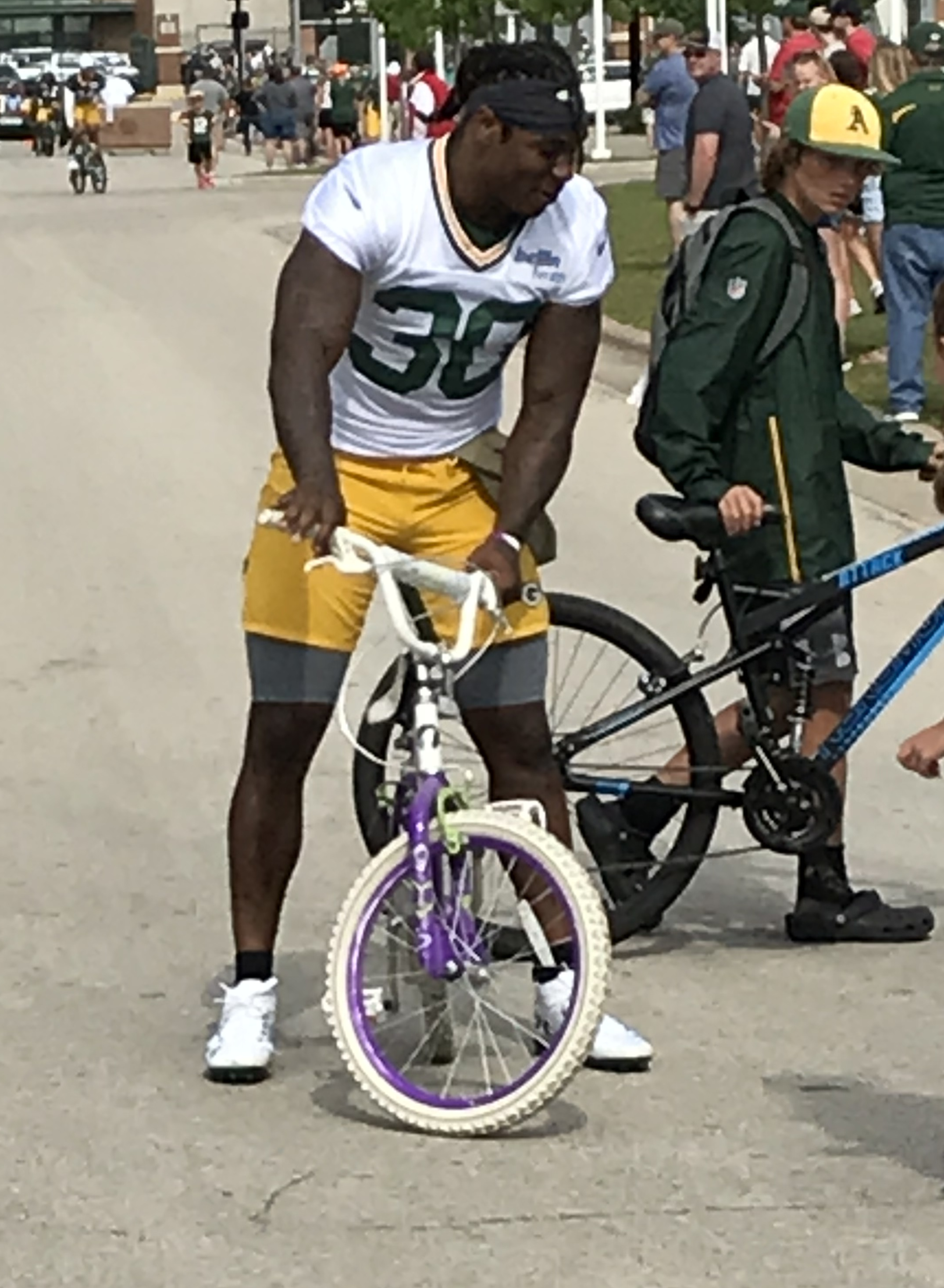
Williams with the Packers in 2019

Williams was drafted by the Green Bay Packers in the fourth round with the 134th overall pick in the 2017 NFL draft. He was the 13th running back selected in that year's draft. He was signed to his rookie contract on June 1, 2017. On September 10, 2017, in his NFL debut, Williams had two rushes for nine yards in a 17–9 victory over the Seattle Seahawks. In Week 9, against the Detroit Lions, he scored his first career rushing touchdown. On December 3, against the Tampa Bay Buccaneers, he had 113 rushing yards and a rushing touchdown. Overall, he finished his rookie season with 556 rushing yards, four rushing touchdowns, 25 receptions, 262 receiving yards, and two receiving touchdowns.

In the 2018 season, Williams recorded 464 rushing yards, three rushing touchdowns, and 27 receptions for 210 receiving yards.

During a Week 4 loss to the Philadelphia Eagles on September 26, 2019, Williams suffered a concussion during an illegal helmet-to-helmet hit by Eagles defensive end Derek Barnett. Williams lay motionless on the turf for several minutes before medical staff wheeled him off the field on a gurney; he was immediately transported to a local hospital for evaluation, but was released from the hospital the next day. In the following week's game against the Lions, Williams rushed 14 times for 104 yards and caught four passes for 32 yards and a touchdown in the 23–22 win. In Week 8 against the Kansas City Chiefs, Williams rushed seven times for 22 yards and a touchdown and caught three passes for 14 yards and a touchdown in the 31–24 win. Overall, he recorded 460 rushing yards and one rushing touchdown to go along with 39 receptions for 253 receiving yards and five receiving touchdowns.

Williams was placed on the reserve/COVID-19 list by the team on November 3, 2020, and activated six days later. Williams finished the 2020 season with 119 carries for 505 rushing yards and four rushing touchdowns to go along with 31 receptions for 236 receiving yards and one receiving touchdown.

=== Detroit Lions ===
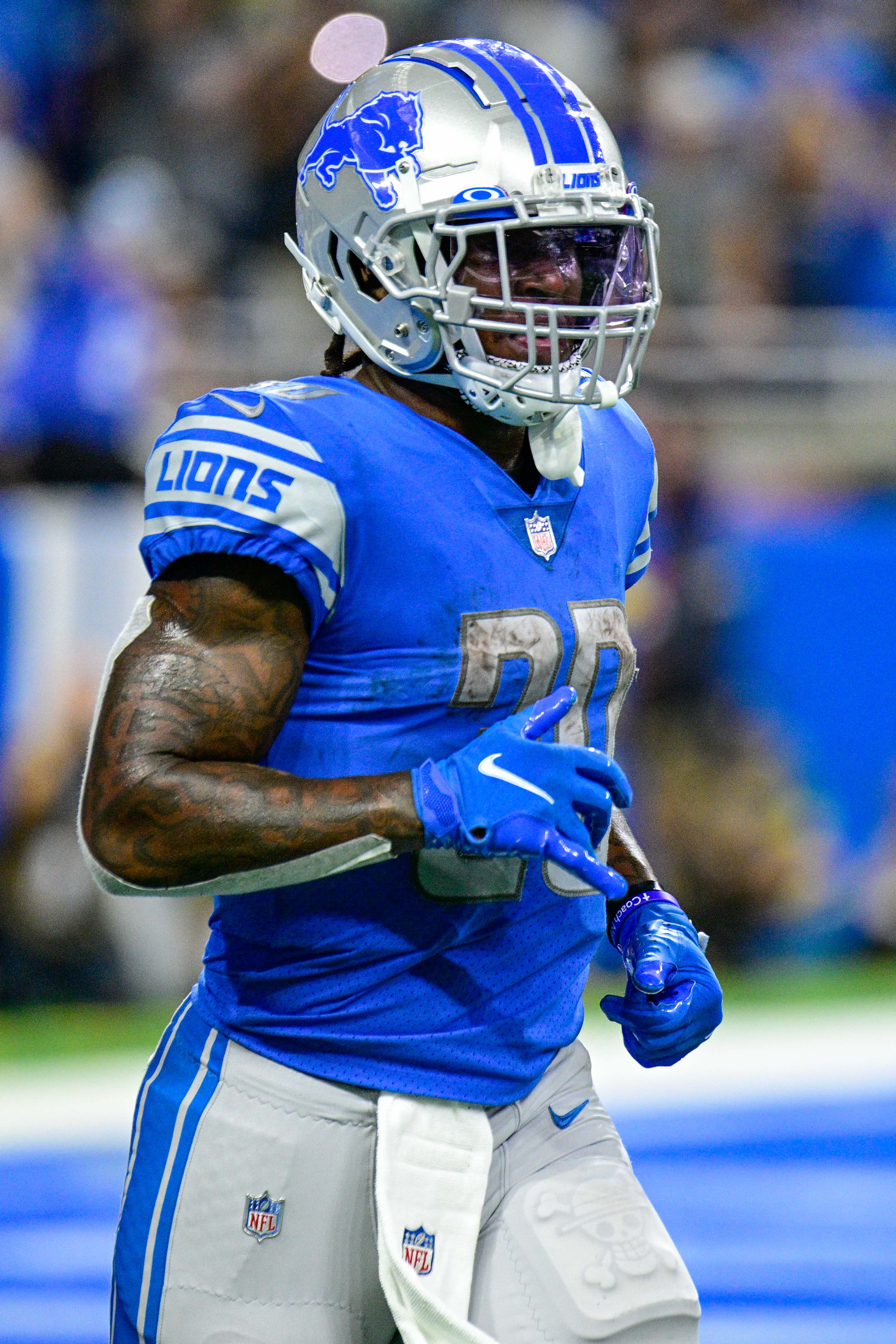
Williams with the Lions in 2022

On March 19, 2021, Williams signed a two-year contract with the Lions. In the Lions' 2021 regular season opener, he had 110 scrimmage yards in the 41–33 loss to the San Francisco 49ers. On November 25, 2021, Williams carried the ball for the 585th time in his career, breaking the NFL record previously held by Phillip Lindsay for the most carries without ever fumbling. Williams finished the 2021 season with 153 carries for 601 rushing yards and three rushing touchdowns to go along with 26 receptions for 157 receiving yards.

In the Lions' first four games to start the 2022 season, Williams recorded two rushing touchdowns in three of the games. In Week 11, against the New York Giants, he had three rushing touchdowns in the 31–18 victory. In Week 17, against the Chicago Bears, he had 22 carries for 144 rushing yards and one rushing touchdown in the 41–10 victory. With two rushing touchdowns in the final game of the regular season against the Green Bay Packers in Week 18, Williams set the Lions' single-season touchdown record with 17, surpassing the previous record of 16 set by Barry Sanders in 1991. He finished the year with career-highs in yards (1,066), touchdowns (17) and carries (262) while playing in all 17 games for the Lions.

=== New Orleans Saints ===
On March 17, 2023, Williams signed a three-year contract with the New Orleans Saints. He suffered a hamstring injury in Week 2 and was placed on injured reserve on September 23, 2023. He was activated on October 19. Williams failed to record a rushing touchdown during the 2023 season until the Saints' final offensive play against the Atlanta Falcons in Week 18. While Saints head coach Dennis Allen called for a quarterback kneel to exhaust the final minute of the game, quarterback Jameis Winston instead handed the ball to Williams who scored a one-yard touchdown.

In the 2024 season, Williams had 48 carries for 164 yards and one touchdown.

On March 4, 2025, the Saints released Williams after two seasons.

== Career statistics ==
=== NFL ===
Legend
	Led the league
**Bold**	Career-high

==== Regular season ====
Year	Team	Games		Rushing					Receiving					Fumbles	
Year	Team	GP	GS	Att	Yds	Avg	Lng	TD	Rec	Yds	Avg	Lng	TD	Fum	Lost
2017	GB	16	7	153	556	3.6	25	4	25	**262**	**10.5**	**54**	2	0	0
2018	GB	16	8	121	464	3.8	20	3	27	210	7.8	26	0	0	0
2019	GB	14	2	107	460	**4.3**	45	1	**39**	253	6.5	17	**5**	0	0
2020	GB	14	3	119	505	4.2	25	2	31	236	7.6	29	1	0	0
2021	DET	13	**11**	153	601	3.9	20	3	26	157	6.0	15	0	1	0
2022	DET	**17**	9	**262**	**1,066**	4.1	**58**	**17**	12	73	6.1	17	0	**3**	**2**
2023	NO	13	4	106	306	2.9	17	1	18	62	3.4	12	0	1	0
2024	NO	14	1	48	164	3.4	13	1	9	57	6.3	13	0	0	0
Total		117	45	1,069	4,122	3.9	58	32	187	1,310	6.8	54	8	5	2

==== Postseason ====
Year	Team	Games		Rushing					Receiving					Fumbles	
Year	Team	GP	GS	Att	Yds	Avg	Lng	TD	Rec	Yds	Avg	Lng	TD	Fum	Lost
2019	GB	**2**	0	4	9	2.3	4	0	3	10	3.3	9	0	0	0
2020	GB	**2**	**1**	**19**	**88**	**4.6**	**12**	0	**4**	**22**	**5.5**	**11**	0	0	0
Total		4	1	23	97	4.2	12	0	7	32	4.6	11	0	0	0

=== College ===
Year	Team	GP	Rushing				Receiving			
Year	Team	GP	Att	Yds	Avg	TD	Rec	Yds	Avg	TD
2012	BYU	**13**	166	775	4.7	**12**	**27**	**315**	**11.7**	**1**
2013	BYU	12	217	1,233	5.7	7	18	125	6.9	0
2014	BYU	8	109	518	4.8	4	8	47	5.9	0
2015	BYU	0	Redshirt							
2016	BYU	10	**234**	**1,375**	**5.9**	**12**	7	80	11.4	0
Career		43	726	3,901	5.4	35	60	567	9.5	1

== Career highlights ==
- NFL rushing touchdowns leader (2022)
- 2x FedEx Ground Player of the Week – Week 11, 2022 Week 17, 2022
- Ranked No. 95 in the Top 100 Players of 2023
- Lions record most rushing touchdowns in a single season: 17
- Lions record most rushing touchdowns in the first 10 games of the regular season: 12 (November 20, 2022)

== Personal life ==
Williams has a daughter. He is a self-described "nerd" for anime, video games, and cosplay. He particularly prefers One Punch Man, Dragon Ball Z, and Naruto. After a game on January 1, 2023, Williams wore a Naruto headband and shirt while giving interviews to reporters, and said that he wanted to go home to play Pokémon Scarlet. During the Sunday Night Football game against the Packers on January 8, 2023, Williams wore a different Naruto headband and introduced himself as "First Swagg Kazekage, leader of the hidden village of the den", a reference to the anime, drawing immediate reactions on social media.
