= Jurupa Hills High School =

Location
- 10700 Oleander Ave; Fontana, California 92337; United States; 34.05944°N 117.45013°W

Information
- Type: Public school
- Established: August 9, 2010
- School district: Fontana Unified School District
- Principal: Antonio Viramontes
- Faculty: 87.08 (FTE)
- Student to teacher ratio: 19.95
- Color
- Mascot: Spartan
- Website: jhills.fusd.net

Jurupa Hills High School is a public high school in Fontana, California. It has been open since August 9, 2010

== See also ==
- List of Riverside County, California, placename etymologies#Jurupa
