= Summit High School (Fontana, California) =

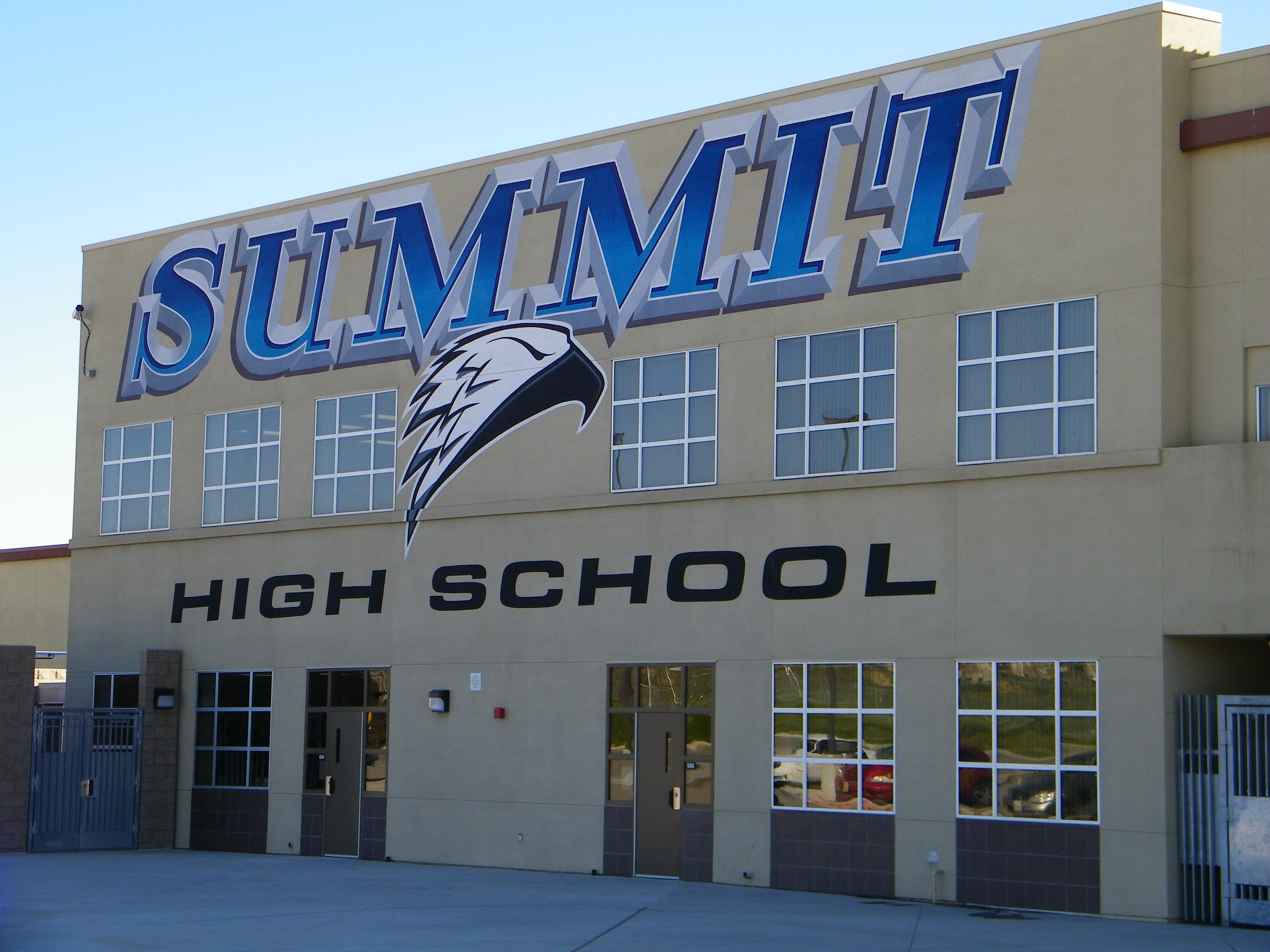

Location
- 15551 Summit Ave; Fontana, California; United States

Information
- Type: State school
- Established: September 5, 2006
- School district: Fontana Unified School District
- Principal: John Richmond
- Teaching staff: 109.53 (FTE)
- Enrollment: 2,626 (2023–2024)
- Student to teacher ratio: 23.98
- Colors: Blue; Silver; White
- Athletics conference: CIF Southern Section; Sunkist League
- Mascot: Sky Hawk
- Website: summithigh.fusd.net

Summit High School in Fontana, California, is one of five comprehensive high schools in the Fontana Unified School District. It is located at 15551 Summit Avenue. The Summit Branch Public Library is located on the school campus. The school was opened on September 5, 2006.

== Demographics ==
In 2013, enrollment was 2,554 students from diversified backgrounds: 70.7% Hispanic or Latino, 13.5% African American, 8.3% White, 4.2% Filipino, 2.2% Asian, 0.2% American Indian, 0.2% Pacific Islander and 0.7% other ethnic backgrounds.

== School motto ==
The school mission statement is "We Can't Spell Summit Without U!"

== American football team ==
Summit High School is known for its American football program, which has found success in the Sunkist League. In the 2011–12 season, Summit won the CIF-SS championship and was ranked 37th in the state of California.

== Notable alumni ==
- Jillian Alleyne, basketball player
- Jamaal Williams, NFL, Football
- Donte Deayon, Ex-NFL Player, Co-Owner GoodEats& Bakers
- Jalin Turner, Professional UFC Fighter
