= Robyn Leigh Tanguay =

American researcher, academic and educator

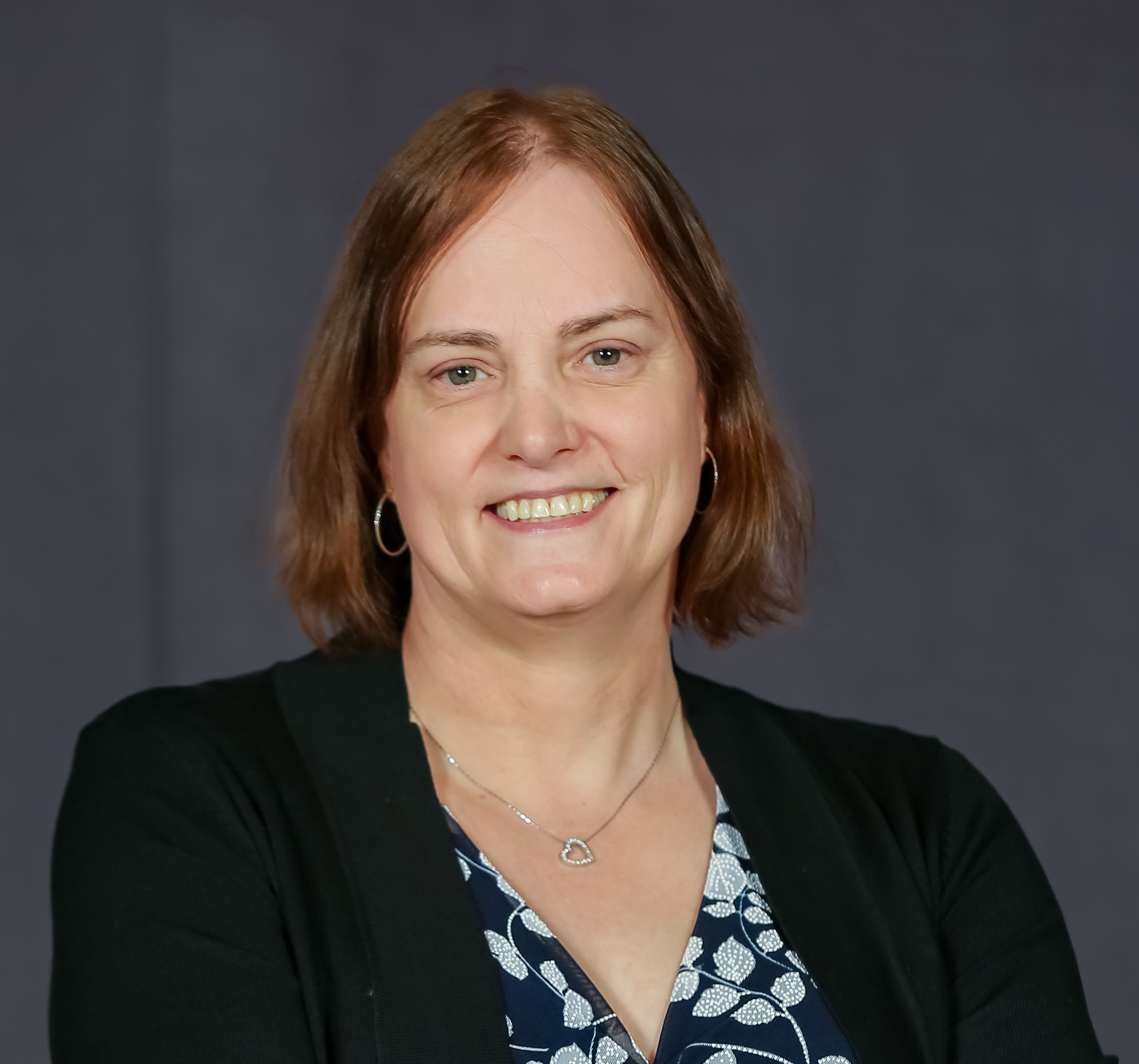
- Born: Robert Tanguay; 1966 (age 59–60); Menominee, Michigan

Academic background
- Education: California State University; University of California, Riverside
- Doctoral advisor: Daniel R. Gallie
- Other advisor: Richard E. Peterson

Academic work
- Institutions: Oregon State University

Robyn Leigh Tanguay (born Robert Tanguay) is an American researcher, academic and educator. She is a distinguished professor in the department of environmental and molecular toxicology at Oregon State University. She is the director of Superfund Research Program, the director of Pacific Northwest Center for Translational Environmental Health Research and the director of Sinnhuber Aquatic Research Laboratory at OSU.

At OSU, she leads the eponymous Tanguay Lab, where she applies systems toxicology principles using the zebrafish (Danio rerio) to discover the chemicals in the environment that can interact with expressed genomes to produce diseases and other dysfunctions. Her central hypothesis is that intrinsic chemical structures dictate biological activity. The shape of chemicals permit interactions with distinct biological targets to alter normal biological activity. She uses chemical structural information; coupled with the biological responses they produce in zebrafish, as anchors to screen for potentially hazardous chemicals and to discover new biology.

== Education ==
Tanguay was born in 1966 in Menominee, Michigan. After finishing the 11th grade, Tanguay moved, to Fontana, California where she graduated from Fontana High School. Tanguay received a Bachelor of Arts in biology in 1988 from California State University, San Bernardino. She received technical research training in the department of molecular biology at the City of Hope National Medical Center and the Beckman Research Institute in Duarte, California in the laboratory of Arthur Riggs. She then joined University of California, Riverside, where she received a Ph.D in biochemistry in 1995 under the guidance of Daniel R Gallie. She completed her Postdoctoral training with Richard E. Peterson at the University of Wisconsin, Madison.

== Career ==
In 1999, Tanguay joined University of Colorado as an assistant professor of molecular toxicology. She left the University of Colorado in 2003 to join Oregon State University as an associate professor of molecular toxicology and to direct the Sinnhuber Aquatic Research Laboratory, becoming full professor in 2010. She directs of the National Institute of Environmental Health Sciences and is the current Oregon State University Superfund Research Center and formerly the Pacific Northwest Center for Translational Environmental Health Research. In 2011, she became the youngest distinguished professor to date at Oregon State University.

In 2006, Tanguay joined Wenzhou Medical College in China as an Adjunct Faculty Member (2006-2008). Tanguay has served on many academic, commercial and federal advisory boards. She served as the Vice President of Northwest Association of Toxicologists in 2006 and later served as the President of the association in 2007. In 2016, she served as the president of Society of Toxicology Nanotoxicology Specialty Section. She has been the associate editor of Toxicology Reports since 2013, Toxicological Sciences since 2014, and Nanomaterials since 2015.

=== Research ===
Tanguay applies systems toxicology principles using the zebrafish to discover the chemicals in the environment that can interact with expressed genomes to produce diseases and other dysfunctions. Her central hypothesis is that intrinsic chemical structures dictate biological activity. The shape of chemicals permit interactions with distinct biological targets to alter normal biological activity. She uses chemical structural information; coupled with the biological responses they produce in zebrafish, as anchors to screen for potentially hazardous chemicals and to discover new biology.

Tanguay's lab has worked to increase the use of zebrafish for green chemistry and green nano. Her lab has also develops instrument, protocol and software to incorporate the use of zebrafish into the high throughput environment.

Tanguay's lab has also conducted research on tissue regeneration. Their research is focused on discovering molecular pathways that prevent or promote tissue regeneration in vertebrates.

== Personal life ==
Born as Robert Tanguay, Tanguay felt that she could connect more with women and that there was something amiss with her identity since childhood. She struggled to understand what was wrong. In her teen years, she understood that she was transgender, but kept this fact hidden, growing increasingly lonely. After she was married and had a daughter, she began meeting other trans people, which gave her the courage to share her experiences with other people. She began living as a woman privately while maintaining a male persona in her professional life. In 2019, she publicly transitioned, changing her name to Robyn.

== Awards and honors ==
- 2012 – PANWAT Achievement Award
- 2018 – Outstanding Alumni Award Cal State University San Bernardino
- 2018 – Roy G. Arnold/Agricultural Research Foundation Leadership Award, College of Agriculture Sciences
- 2019 – Agricultural Research Foundation Distinguished Faculty Award
- 2020 – Society of Toxicology Reproductive and Developmental Toxicology Scientific Achievement Award
- 2021 – Oregon State University Excellence in Postdoctoral Mentoring Award
- 2023 – Society of Toxicology Toxicologist Mentoring Award
- 2023 – Fellow - Hagler Institute for Advanced Study at Texas A&M University
- 2025 – Society of Toxicology Leading Edge in Basic Science Award
