= Lonyae Miller =

American football player (born 1988)

No. 35, 36
- Position: Running back

Personal information
- Born: April 29, 1988 (age 38); Los Angeles, California, U.S.
- Listed height: 6 ft 0 in (1.83 m)
- Listed weight: 232 lb (105 kg)

Career information
- High school: Henry J. Kaiser (Fontana, California)
- College: Fresno State (2006–2009)
- NFL draft: 2010: undrafted

Career history
- Dallas Cowboys (2010); Oakland Raiders (2011–2012)*; Seattle Seahawks (2012)*; Baltimore Ravens (2012–2013)*
- * Offseason or practice squad member only

Awards and highlights
- Super Bowl champion (XLVII); Humanitarian Bowl champion (2007)
- Stats at Pro Football Reference

Lonyae Durell Miller Jr. (born April 29, 1988) is an American former professional football player who was a running back in the National Football League for the Dallas Cowboys, Oakland Raiders, Seattle Seahawks and Baltimore Ravens. He played college football for the Fresno State Bulldogs.

== Early life ==
Miller was born in Los Angeles, California and grew up in Fontana, located in neighboring San Bernardino County. He graduated from Henry J. Kaiser High School of Fontana in 2006.

As a senior, he rushed for 2,567 yards (fourth in the state) on 277 carries, had a 9.27-yard per carry average and scored 34 touchdowns. He rushed for more than 100 yards in every game and had seven contests of 200 or more yards. He had 277 rushing yards and four touchdowns against Coachella Valley High School. He also played defensive back, registering 19 tackles (16 solo) and 2 interceptions. He received third-team All-state, All-CIF Southern Section and Sunkist League Offensive MVP honors.

He competed in track & field as a sprinter, recording personal-best times of 10.7 seconds in the 100 meters and 21.9 seconds in the 200 meters.

College recruiting
Name	Hometown	School	Height	Weight	40^{‡}	Commit date
Lonyae Miller; RB	Fontana, California	Henry J. Kaiser HS	5 ft 11 in (1.80 m)	198 lb (90 kg)	4.53	Dec 18, 2005
Lonyae Miller; RB	Recruit ratings: Scout: Rivals: (72)					
Overall recruit ranking: Scout: 92 (school) Rivals: 38 (RB); 63 (CA); 75 (school)
‡ Refers to 40-yard dash; Note: In many cases, Scout, Rivals, 247Sports, On3, and ESPN may conflict in their listings of height, weight and 40 time.; In these cases, the average was taken. ESPN grades are on a 100-point scale.; Sources: "2006 Fresno St. Football Commitment List". Rivals.; "2006 Fresno State College Football Team Recruiting Prospects". Scout.; "Fresno State Bulldogs 2006 Player Commits". ESPN.; "Scout.com Team Recruiting Rankings". Scout.; "2006 Team Ranking". Rivals.com.

== College career ==
Miller accepted a football scholarship from Fresno State University. As a true freshman, he appeared in 10 games and was the backup behind running back Dwayne Wright, tallying 288 rushing yards (second on the team) on 54 carries with 2 touchdowns. He led the team with 16 carries for 113 yards and a touchdown against Hawaii.

As a sophomore, he started 8 out of 10 games and was third on the team behind true freshman Ryan Mathews, with 624 yards on 132 carries and scored 7 touchdowns.

As a junior, even though Mathews missed time with a knee injury, Miller was also limited with injuries and missed the game against Louisiana Tech University. Anthony Harding ended up taking over as the rushing leader of the team. Miller rushed for 844 yards (second on the team) on 120 carries (6.8-yard avg.) and scored 7 touchdowns. Among his highlights were 161 rushing yards (including a 90-yard run) with two touchdowns against Hawaii and 181 rushing yards, including an 80-yard touchdown against Idaho.

As a senior, he remained a backup and his production dropped as Mathews led the nation in rushing with an average of 150.67 yards per contest in 12 games. Miller also fell behind freshman Robbie Rouse, posting 367 rushing yards (third on the team) on 68 carries (5.2 yards avg.), with 9 receptions for 38 yards. He finished his college career with 45 games, 2,062 rushing yards on 374 carries and 20 touchdowns in his four seasons. He also made 14 receptions for 91 yards.

== Professional career ==
=== 2010 NFL Combine ===
Pre-draft measurables
Height	Weight	Arm length	Hand span	40-yard dash	10-yard split	20-yard split	20-yard shuttle	Three-cone drill	Vertical jump	Broad jump	Bench press
5 ft 11 in (1.80 m)	221 lb (100 kg)	30 3/4	8 7/8	4.53 s	1.55 s	2.60 s	4.54 s	7.20 s	36.5 in (0.93 m)	10 ft 0 in (3.05 m)	26 reps
All values from the NFL Scouting Combine.

=== Dallas Cowboys ===
Miller was signed as an undrafted free agent by the Dallas Cowboys after the 2010 NFL draft on April 30. He was waived on September 4, but was signed to the practice squad a day later. After Marion Barber suffered a calf injury, he was promoted to the active roster on December 3, to be the team's third-string running back and play on special teams. In 2011, he was passed on the depth chart by running back Phillip Tanner and was released on September 3.

=== Oakland Raiders ===
On December 7, 2011, he was signed by the Oakland Raiders to their practice squad. He was released on August 31, 2012.

=== Seattle Seahawks ===
On September 27, 2012, he was signed by the Seattle Seahawks to the practice squad. He was cut on October 2.

=== Baltimore Ravens ===
On December 18, 2012, he was signed by the Baltimore Ravens to the practice squad. He was considered part of the roster when the team won Super Bowl XLVII. He was released on May 3, 2013.

== Personal life ==
Miller's father (Lonyae Miller Sr.), was a special education teacher in the Fontana Unified School District.

Lonyae Miller is now the head football coach for Ontario Christian High School

He is also the weights coach there at Ontario Christian High School.
