= A. B. Miller High School =

Public high school in Fontana, California

Location
- 6821 Oleander Ave; Fontana, California 92336; United States; 34°07′46″N 117°26′53″W

Information
- Type: Public school
- Established: October 1991
- School district: Fontana Unified School District
- Principal: Barbara Kelley
- Teaching staff: 96.65 (FTE)
- Enrollment: 1,950 (2024–2025)
- Student to teacher ratio: 20.18
- Colors: Red and black
- Mascot: Rebels
- Information: Area total: 0.0778 square miles
- Website: abmiller.fusd.net

A. B. Miller High School is one of five high schools in the Fontana Unified School District that services students in the Fontana area of California, United States.

== History ==
A.B. Miller High School is named after Azariel Blanchard Miller, who is credited as the founder of the city of Fontana. In 1905, he brought 200 head of horse, mules, plows, scrapers and tents into the area and began transforming 17,000 acres of sand, sage brush and rock into a great citrus fruit, poultry and livestock farm.

As of June 2020, Principal Dustin Saxton announced that the school would be removing all instances of the Rebel mascot and mentions of Rebel Nation.

== Academic performance ==
In March 2010, A. B. Miller High School was placed on a list of the lowest performing high schools in the state. A transformation model was put in place in the school, which called for the replacement of the principal and rewarding teachers based on student performance. The principal was not replaced at that time, however, due to having been on the job less than two years.

== Notable alumni ==
- Abe Alvarez, former professional baseball pitcher with Palfinger Reggio Emilia of Italy's Serie A1
- Nick Barnett, NFL player for Green Bay Packers and Washington Redskins
- Jesse Chavez, Major League Baseball player for Los Angeles Angels, Los Angeles Dodgers, Oakland Athletics
- Malik Flowers, professional football player
- Bobby Green, 2-time All-American wrestler; professional mixed martial artist for UFC
- Alan Harper, pro football player, Arena Bowl champion
- Alexis Serna, Canadian Football League player
