= Alan Harper (American football) =

American football player (born 1979)

No. 98
- Position: Defensive tackle

Personal information
- Born: September 6, 1979 (age 47); Fontana, California, U.S.
- Listed height: 6 ft 1 in (1.85 m)
- Listed weight: 285 lb (129 kg)

Career information
- High school: Fontana
- College: Fresno State
- NFL draft: 2002: 4th round, 121st overall pick

Career history
- New York Jets (2002–2004); → Scottish Claymores (2004); San Jose SaberCats (2006–2008); Hamilton Tiger-Cats (2009)*; BC Lions (2009)*; Arizona Rattlers (2010)
- * Offseason or practice squad member only

Awards and highlights
- ArenaBowl champion (2007); All-NFL Europe (2004); Second-team All-American (2001); WAC Defensive Player of the Year (2001); 3× First-team All-WAC (1999–2001)
- Stats at Pro Football Reference
- Stats at ArenaFan.com

Alan Stephen Harper (born September 6, 1979) is an American former professional football player who was a defensive tackle for one season with the New York Jets of the National Football League (NFL). He played college football for the Fresno State Bulldogs and was selected by the Jets in the fourth round of the 2002 NFL draft.

== Early life ==
Harper played high school football at Fontana High School in Fontana, California, and graduated in 1997. He earned first-team All-Citrus Belt League and All-Inland Valley honors his senior year in 1996. He recorded 63 unassisted tackles, 24 assisted tackles, eight sacks and three pass deflections while the team went 11–1–1 in 1996. Harper attended A. B. Miller High School in Fontana his sophomore and junior years, garnering All-San Andreas League accolades twice.

== College career ==
Harper played for the Fresno State Bulldogs from 1998 to 2001. He sat out the 1997 season while fulfilling academic requirements. He earned first-team All-WAC honors in 1999, 2000 and 2001. Harper was Fresno State's nominee for WAC Defensive Player of the Year in 1999 and won the award in 2001. He was also named a second-team All-American by The Sporting News his senior season in 2001.

== Professional career ==
Harper was selected by the New York Jets in the fourth round with the 121st pick in the 2002 NFL draft and signed with the team on July 24, 2002. He was released by the Jets on October 15, 2003, and signed to the team's practice squad on October 16, 2003. He was promoted to the active roster on December 17, 2003. Harper was allocated to NFL Europe on February 9, 2004, where he played for the Scottish Claymores. He was named to the All-NFL Europe Team for his play during the 2004 season. He was released by the Jets on September 5 and signed to the team's practice squad on September 6, 2004. Harper was promoted to the active roster on September 27, 2004. He played in eleven games for the Jets during the 2004 season. He was released by the Jets on August 31, 2005.

Harper was signed by the San Jose SaberCats of the Arena Football League (AFL) on December 19, 2005. He played for the team from 2006 to 2008.

Harper signed with the Hamilton Tiger-Cats of the Canadian Football League (CFL) on February 11, 2009. He was released during final roster cuts on June 25, 2009. He was signed to the practice roster of the CFL's BC Lions on November 18, 2009.

Harper signed with the Arizona Rattlers of the AFL on June 30, 2010, and played for the team during the 2010 season.
