= Donte Deayon =

American football player (born 1994)

Dont'e Deayon
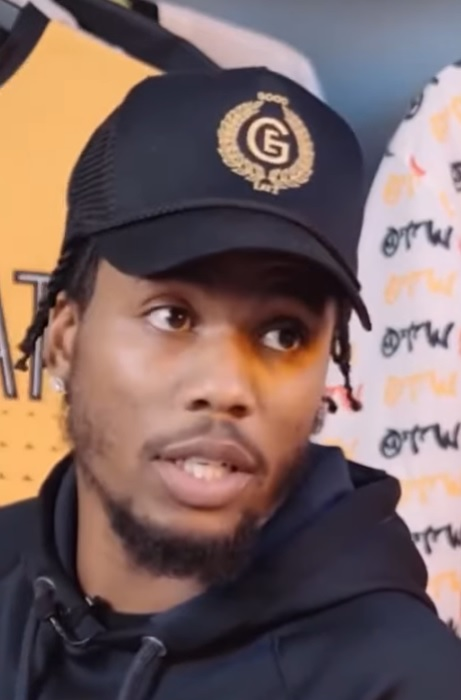
- Deayon in 2021

No. 38, 27, 21
- Position: Cornerback

Personal information
- Born: January 28, 1994 (age 32); Rialto, California, U.S.
- Listed height: 5 ft 9 in (1.75 m)
- Listed weight: 159 lb (72 kg)

Career information
- High school: Summit (Fontana, California)
- College: Boise State
- NFL draft: 2016: undrafted

Career history
- New York Giants (2016–2018); Los Angeles Rams (2018–2021)

Awards and highlights
- Super Bowl champion (LVI); Second-team All-MWC (2014)

Career NFL statistics
- Total tackles: 48
- Fumble recoveries: 1
- Pass deflections: 5
- Stats at Pro Football Reference

Donte Deayon (born January 28, 1994) is an American former professional football player who was a cornerback in the National Football League (NFL). He played college football for the Boise State Broncos, and was signed by the New York Giants as an undrafted free agent in 2016 before signing with the Los Angeles Rams in 2018.

== College career ==
Deayon played college football for the Boise State Broncos, as a 150-pound cornerback. He was named to the All-Mountain West Second-team for three straight seasons.

== Professional career ==
Pre-draft measurables
Height	Weight	Arm length	Hand span	40-yard dash	10-yard split	20-yard split	20-yard shuttle	Three-cone drill	Vertical jump	Broad jump	Bench press
5 ft 8 7/8 in (1.75 m)	158 lb (72 kg)	29 3/8 in (0.75 m)	8 1/2 in (0.22 m)	4.57 s	1.61 s	2.64 s	4.20 s	6.78 s	37.5 in (0.95 m)	10 ft 7 in (3.23 m)	12 reps
All values from Pro Day

=== New York Giants ===
Deayon signed with the New York Giants as an undrafted free agent on May 6, 2016. He was waived on September 3, 2016, and was signed to the practice squad the next day. He was released on October 13, 2016. He signed a reserve/future contract with the Giants on January 9, 2017.

On September 2, 2017, Deayon was waived by the Giants and was signed to the practice squad the next day. He was promoted to the active roster on October 12, 2017. He was placed on injured reserve on November 27, 2017, after suffering a fractured forearm.

On October 16, 2018, Deayon was waived by the Giants to make room for wide receiver Bennie Fowler.

=== Los Angeles Rams ===
On December 12, 2018, Deayon was signed to the Los Angeles Rams practice squad.

Deayon signed a reserve/future contract with the Rams on February 6, 2019. He was waived during final roster cuts on August 31, 2019, but was re-signed the next day to the Rams' practice squad. He was promoted to the active roster on November 13, 2019.

On March 30, 2020, Deayon was re-signed to a one-year contract. He was featured on Hard Knocks that year. On September 5, 2020, Deayon was released from the Rams and signed to the practice squad the next day. He was placed on the practice squad/injured list on October 28, and restored back to the practice squad on November 25. He was elevated to the active roster on January 15, 2021, for the team's divisional playoff game against the Green Bay Packers, and reverted to the practice squad after the game. On January 18, 2021, Deayon signed a reserve/futures contract with the Rams.

On August 31, 2021, Deayon was waived by the Rams and re-signed to the practice squad the next day. He was promoted to the active roster on October 19, 2021. Deayon won Super Bowl LVI when the Rams defeated the Cincinnati Bengals.

=== Retirement ===
On March 2, 2023, Deayon officially announced his retirement via Instagram.
