= David Carter (defensive lineman) =

American football player (born 1987)

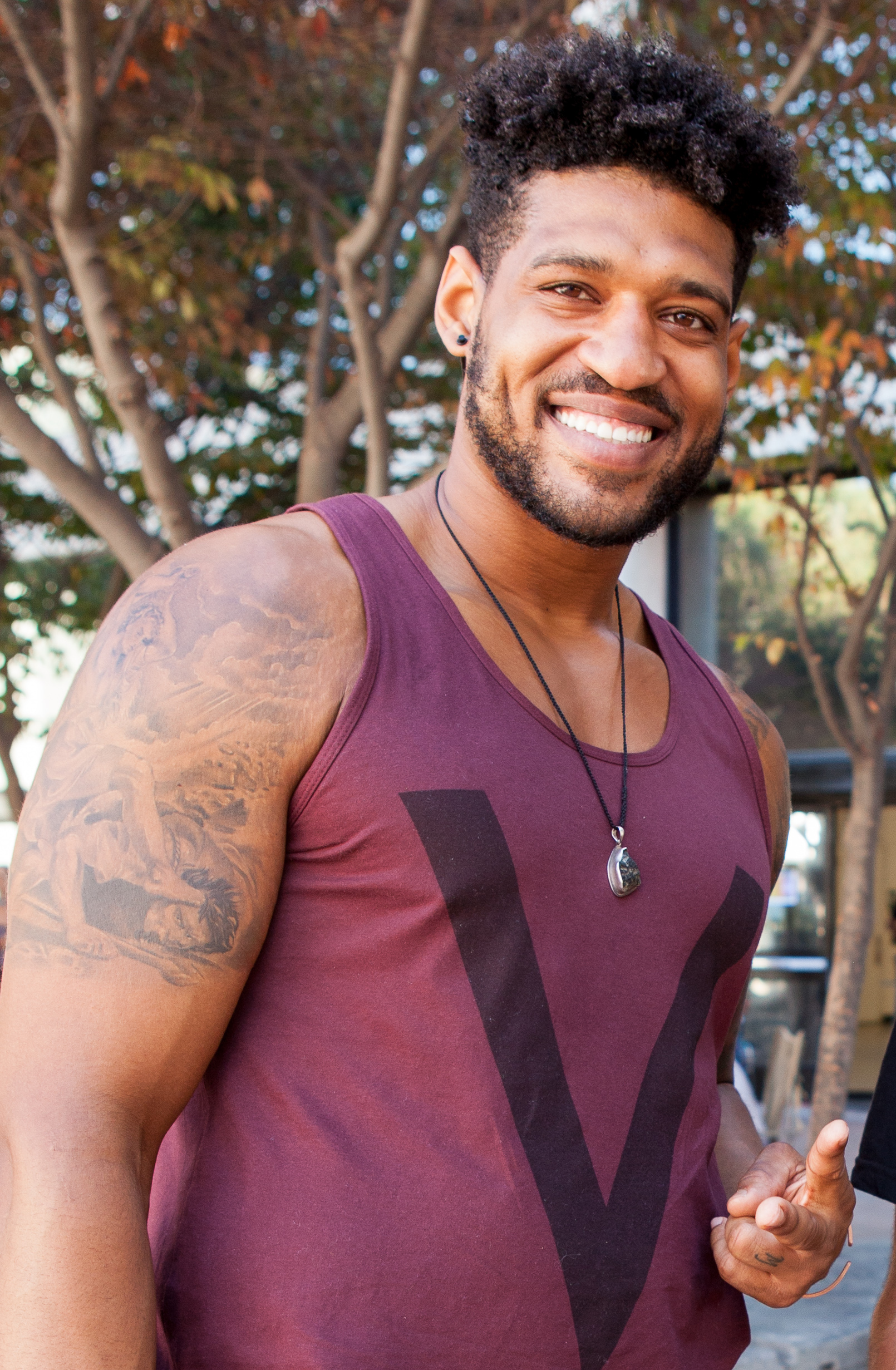
- Carter at a vegan festival in Oakland, 2016

No. 79, 92
- Position: Defensive end

Personal information
- Born: December 10, 1987 (age 38); Los Angeles, California, U.S.
- Listed height: 6 ft 4 in (1.93 m)
- Listed weight: 300 lb (136 kg)

Career information
- High school: Henry J. Kaiser (Fontana, California)
- College: UCLA (2006–2010)
- NFL draft: 2011: 6th round, 184th overall pick

Career history
- Arizona Cardinals (2011–2012); Dallas Cowboys (2013); Oakland Raiders (2014)*; Jacksonville Jaguars (2014)*; Chicago Bears (2015)*
- * Offseason or practice squad member only

Career NFL statistics
- Total tackles: 30
- Sacks: 1.0
- Forced fumbles: 1
- Stats at Pro Football Reference

David H. Carter Jr. (born December 10, 1987) is an American former professional football player who was a defensive end in the National Football League (NFL) for the Arizona Cardinals and Dallas Cowboys. He was selected by the Arizona Cardinals in the sixth round of the 2011 NFL draft. He played college football for the UCLA Bruins.

== Early life ==
Carter attended Henry J. Kaiser High School in Fontana, California. In his senior season, he registered 69 tackles, 7 sacks and 9 pass deflections in 13 games. He was later named for the first-team All-San Bernardino County by the Riverside Press-Enterprise. He was also an All-League selection as a defensive end, and as team captain, lead them to a 10-3 record as a senior. Carter also lettered in Track And Field and was a member of the schools debate team.

== College career ==
Carter played just three games over his first two years at the University of California, Los Angeles, before appearing in all 12 games in the 2008 season. Carter was a co-defensive winner of the Bruins' Captain Don Brown Memorial Award for Most Improved Player in 2009. In his senior season, he recorded 41 Total Tackles while collecting 3.5 sacks for the Bruins which propelled him to win the UCLA Kenneth S. Washington Award for Outstanding Senior.

== Professional career ==
Pre-draft measurables
Height	Weight	40-yard dash	10-yard split	20-yard split	20-yard shuttle	Three-cone drill	Vertical jump	Broad jump	Bench press
6 ft 4 1/2 in (1.94 m)	297 lb (135 kg)	5.02 s	1.75 s	2.80 s	4.69 s	7.63 s	28.5 in (0.72 m)	9 ft 3 in (2.82 m)	25 reps
All values from Pro Day

Carter was selected by the Arizona Cardinals in the sixth round of the 2011 NFL draft. He spent two seasons with the Cardinals, starting just four games and totaling one sack and 17 total tackles.

On September 16, 2013, Carter signed with the Dallas Cowboys, to provide depth because of multiple injuries on the defensive line. He was declared inactive in the third game of the season and played in the next three games. He was released on October 14.

Carter was signed by the Jacksonville Jaguars on August 2, 2014. The Jaguars released Carter on August 24, 2014.

The Chicago Bears signed Carter to a one-year contract on July 28, 2015. On September 5, 2015, he was released by the Bears.

He finished his professional career with 35 games (4 starts), 30 tackles (4 for loss), one sack, one forced fumble and three pass breakups.

== Advocacy ==
Carter is a vegan activist. He became vegan in 2014 after watching the documentary Forks Over Knives. He advocates for veganism – mainly from a health point of view, but also for animal rights – at speaking engagements and on his website. He and his wife Paige Carter are on the staff of Vegan Outreach.

== See also ==
- List of vegans
