= Reuben Henderson =

American football player (born 1958)

No. 20
- Position: Cornerback

Personal information
- Born: October 3, 1958 (age 68); Santa Monica, California, U.S.
- Listed height: 6 ft 1 in (1.85 m)
- Listed weight: 196 lb (89 kg)

Career information
- High school: Fontana (Fontana, California)
- College: Oklahoma State; San Diego State
- NFL draft: 1981: 6th round, 150th overall pick

Career history
- Chicago Bears (1981–1982); San Diego Chargers (1983–1984)

Career NFL statistics
- Interceptions: 4
- Fumble recoveries: 1
- Sacks: 1
- Stats at Pro Football Reference

Reuben Stanley Henderson, D.O. (born October 3, 1958) is an American former professional football player who played cornerback for four seasons for the Chicago Bears and the San Diego Chargers of the National Football League (NFL). He played college football for the Oklahoma St. Cowboys and San Diego State Aztecs. After his football career, Henderson became a practicing physician, specializing in physiatry.

== Early life ==
Reuben Henderson was born in Santa Monica, California. He attended Fontana High School in Fontana, California, graduating in 1976. He then attended Oklahoma State University and San Diego State University.

== Football ==
After a standout career at Fontana High School, culminating in a CIF championship game in 1976, Henderson then joined the football program at Oklahoma State University. He later finished his college football career at San Diego State University. Henderson was selected 150th overall by the Chicago Bears in the 6th round in 1981. He played two years in Chicago, before being traded to the San Diego Chargers. After two years with the Chargers, Henderson retired from professional football.

== After football ==
After his professional football career ended in 1984, Henderson enrolled in medical school at Michigan State University College of Osteopathic Medicine, where he graduated "best clinical student" in the class of 1993 with a Doctor of Osteopathic Medicine degree. He completed a physical medicine and rehabilitation (PM&R) residency in the University of Michigan Health System. He currently operates a PM&R private practice in Lansing, Michigan.
