= Henry J. Kaiser High School (California) =

Coordinates: 34°03′03″N 117°29′36″W

Location
- 11155 Almond Ave; Fontana, California; United States

Information
- Type: Public school
- Motto: Together We Build
- Established: September 1998
- School district: Fontana Unified School District
- Principal: Monica Young
- Teaching staff: 89.79 (FTE)
- Enrollment: 1,794 (2023–2024)
- Student to teacher ratio: 19.98
- Color
- Athletics conference: CIF Southern Section; Sunkist League
- Mascot: Cat (Spots)
- Website: https://www.fusd.net/kaiser

Henry J. Kaiser High School is a small to medium-sized high school located at 11155 Almond Avenue in Fontana, California. Kaiser High is one of five comprehensive high schools within Fontana Unified School District. The school is named after renowned American industrialist Henry J. Kaiser, who founded the famous Kaiser Steel Mill, which helped to revolutionize the city of Fontana.

The school was established in 1998. As of 2025, the principal is Monica Young. Kaiser High School has been experimenting recently with small learning communities.

== Enrollment and demographics ==
As of the 2023–2024 school year, the school had an enrollment of 1,794 students. The gender distribution was 50.10% female, 49.80% male, and 0.5% nonbinary or gender-nonconforming. Grade 9 had 397 students, grade 10 had 459 students, grade 11 had 476 students, and grade 12 had 462 students.

For ethnicity, the student population was composed of 88.2% Hispanic or Latino, 4.7% Black or African American, 3.2% White, 1.7% Asian, 1.3% Filipino, 0.8% identifying as two or more races, and 0.1% Native Hawaiian or Pacific Islander.

Additionally, 17.0% of students were English Language Learners, 13.1% were classified as students with disabilities, and 83.4% were identified as socioeconomically disadvantaged. The population included 0.8% experiencing homelessness, 0.3% in foster care, and 0% of students being military-connected.

== Athletics ==
=== Football ===
Kaiser High School is known for its successful football program under coach Dick Bruich. Under his supervision, he led Kaiser Football to one state championship, two CIF championships, one CIF runner-up award, two CIF semi-final appearances, eight Sunkist League titles, and eight consecutive playoff berths, before retiring in 2009.

In 2006 Lonyae Miller transferred to Kaiser from Rialto high school and he was a standout on the football team, chosen as All-CIF Southern Section at running back and named the Sunkist League Offensive MVP. Miller later attended Fresno State and is now a professional player in the NFL.

As of 2014 the football team were back-to-back Sunkist League champions. In 2012, the Kaiser Football team made it to the SS-CIF championship, where they defeated Rancho Verde to claim the 2012 CIF Central Division Championship Title.

== Student activities ==
=== Catamount Pride Marching Band & Color Guard ===
Kaiser High School is home to the Catamount Pride Marching Band and Color Guard. In 2008, and most recently 2014, the band won the sweepstakes at the Azusa Golden Days Parade. They've also won sweepstakes in the Riverside King Band Review, 2nd place in the Chino Band Review, 10,000 dollars at the LA County Fair, sweepstakes and music award in the Ganesha Band Review, and 1st place in the Arcadia Band Review.

The Kaiser Catamount Pride Marching Band hosted the first annual Kaiser Band Review September 26, 2009.

In 2019, the band participated in the 2019 Rose Parade with Grand Marshal Chaka Khan in the opening show.

=== Kaiser Artistic and Theatrical Society ===
Kaiser Artistic and Theatrical Society, known as "K.A.T.S. Productions", is the name of the drama club at Henry J. Kaiser High. The club is responsible for producing the school theatrical productions each year. In addition, the club engages in other theatrical activities, like improvisational workshops and field trips to see professional productions. The club includes an active troupe of the International Thespian Society, number 6721.

== Awards ==
- Inland Empire Team of the Decade for football (Sunkist league champions 2001–2011)
- 1st Place at SCSBOA 2005 La Palma Days Band Review
- 1st Place at SCSBOA Arcadia Festival Of Bands (2008, 2009)
- 1st Place at SCSBOA 2009 Ganesha Band Review
- 1st Place at SCSBOA Azusa Golden Days (2010, 2012, 2013) & Riverside King Band Review (2010 & 2012)
- 1st Place at SCSBOA 41st Annual Chino Invitational Band Review

== Notable alumni ==
- Tyler Allgeier (Class of 2018), football player NFL, Atlanta Falcons
- Chris Carter (Class of 2007), former football player NFL, Pittsburgh Steelers
- David Carter (Class of 2006), former football player NFL, Arizona Cardinals
- Lonyae Miller (Class of 2006), former football player, NFL, Dallas Cowboys
- Jason Shirley (Class of 2003), former football player NFL, Cincinnati Bengals
- Josh Shirley (Class of 2010), former football player NFL, Tampa Bay Buccaneers
- Nacho Alvarez Jr. (Class of 2021), baseball player, MLB, Atlanta Braves
