= Citrus High School (Fontana, California) =

Continuation school in Fontana, California, United States

Location
- 10760 Cypress Avenue; Fontana, California 92337; United States

Information
- Type: Continuation
- Established: August 8, 2011
- School district: Fontana Unified School District
- Principal: Mike Bunten
- Staff: 23.21 (FTE)
- Student to teacher ratio: 16.89
- Colors: Cyan, Black and Brown
- Mascot: Jaguar
- Website: https://www.fusd.net/CitrusHigh

Citrus High School is located at 10760 Cypress Avenue in Fontana, California. It has been open since August 8, 2011.
