= St. Paul High School (Santa Fe Springs, California) =

Private, college-prep school in Santa Fe Springs, California, United States

Saint Paul High School
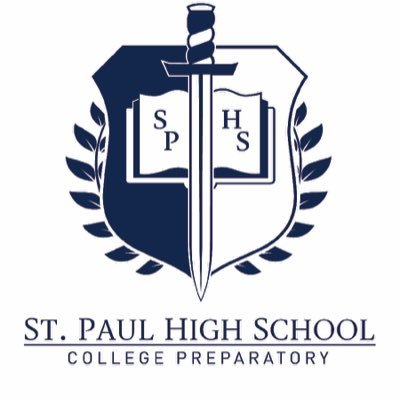
- Crest of St. Paul High School

Location
- 9635 Greenleaf Avenue; Santa Fe Springs, (Los Angeles County), California 90670; United States; 33°57′5″N 118°3′9″W

Information
- Type: Private, College-prep
- Motto: "Now No Longer I, But Christ Lives In Me"
- Religious affiliation: Roman Catholic
- Patron saint: St. Paul the Apostle
- Established: 1956
- Founder: Cardinal McIntyre
- Authority: Archdiocese of Los Angeles
- Dean: Gregory Dixon
- Principal: Robert Miller
- Chaplain: Fr. Marco Reyes
- Grades: 9-12
- Gender: Coeducational
- Enrollment: <450 (2020)
- Campus size: small
- Colors: Navy Blue and White
- Fight song: "Hail to the Swordsmen"
- Athletics conference: Camino Real League, Del Rey League, Santa Fe League
- Sports: Football, Basketball (boys and girls), Baseball, Softball, Cross Country (boys and girls), Volleyball (boys and girls), Soccer (boys and girls), Track and Field (boys and girls) Golf (boys and girls)
- Mascot: Swordsmen and Lady Swordsmen
- Team name: Swordsmen and Lady Swordsmen
- Accreditation: Western Association of Schools and Colleges
- Newspaper: "The Two-Edged Sword"
- Yearbook: Lumen
- Tuition: $12,500
- Athletic Director: Mary Anderson
- Website: www.stpaulhs.org

St. Paul High School is a private, Catholic, co-educational high school serving the Gateway Cities of Los Angeles County owned and operated by the Roman Catholic Archdiocese of Los Angeles, and was founded in 1956. The campus is located in Santa Fe Springs approximately 14 miles (23 km) east of downtown Los Angeles. It was named after St. Paul the Apostle.

== History ==
St. Paul began in the fall of 1956 during a decade in which Cardinal James Francis McIntyre opened an astonishing 24 Catholic high schools. It was known then as Santa Fe Catholic High School, located in two classrooms at St. Marianne School in Pico Rivera, with 100 freshmen from the surrounding Whittier area parishes. The staff consisted of: School Sister of Notre Dame Michael Marie (principal), Franciscan Brother Martin, and Dominican Sister Siena. It is said that a Disney came to the school and told a student to build his dreams up. In 1989 George Lopez also came to the school to give a speech to a class.

In 1957, the school name was changed to St. Paul to avoid confusion with the recently opened local public high school named Santa Fe. In January 1958, St. Paul High School moved to its present location on Greenleaf Avenue with a student body of 325 freshmen and sophomores. The first class graduated in May 1960.

Since its beginning, St. Paul has been staffed by members of the Order of St. Francis, clergy from the Archdiocese of Los Angeles and, at various times, members of eight different religious congregations. For the past 50 years, there have always been at least one Franciscan Brother on the faculty. The majority of the teaching faculty is made up of lay men and women. Today St. Paul High School has an enrollment of less than 450 students.

== Football ==
The longtime head football coach of the St. Paul Swordsmen was Marijon Ancich. In 1959, after college, Ancich started as an assistant coach. After being named head coach two years later, he went on to coach from 1961 to 1981 and again from 1993 to 2005, before returning for a third stint in 2009. He is the second winningest high school football coach in California history with a record of 344-123-4, as of the 2008 high school football season. In his long career, Ancich's teams won three CIF titles ('68,'72,'81), two California State titles and 19 league championships.

== Former Principal Lori Barr ==
On 29 June 2012, former St. Paul Principal Lori Barr was sentenced to 180 days in Los Angeles County jail for charging more than $64,000 on her school-issued American Express charge card. Barr served as principal from July 2008 to May 2010. Barr was accused of using the school's card for her own personal expenses including hotel stays, meals, personal travel and salon visits. Barr pleaded no contest to the charges and has since repaid the debt.

== Notable alumni ==
- Marcell Allmond, NFL player
- Bill Bain, NFL player
- Eileen Davidson, actress
- Mike Gallego, MLB player
- Ed Luther, NFL player
- Christy Nkanu, CFL player
- Jamie Quirk, MLB player
- Andy Rincon, MLB player
- Andy Stankiewicz, MLB player
- Scott Tinley, two-time winner Ironman triathlon World Championship
- Matt Willig, NFL player and actor

== Notes and references ==
Robert Younger
