= Fontana Unified School District =

School district in California

Address
- 9680 Citrus Avenue Fontana, San Bernardino, California; United States

District information
- Type: Public
- Grades: K through 12
- Superintendent: Miki R. Inbody
- NCES District ID: 0613920

Students and staff
- Students: 35,461 (2020–2021)
- Teachers: 1,704.3 (FTE)
- Staff: 1,927.04 (FTE)
- Student–teacher ratio: 20.81:1

Other information
- Website: www.fusd.net

Fontana Unified School District is located in and serves most of the city of Fontana, California, United States, a community in San Bernardino County about 50 miles east of Los Angeles. The district contains 45 schools, which serve students from K-12 to adult education. It was established in the 1920s and unified in 1956.

The district includes most of Fontana and a portion of Rialto.

== Schools ==
=== High School ===
- A.B. Miller High School
- Fontana High School
- Henry J. Kaiser High School
- Jurupa Hills High School
- Summit High School

=== 7-12 ===
- Oak Grove Preparatory Academy

=== Middle School ===
- Alder Middle School
- Almeria Middle School
- Fontana Middle School
- Harry S. Truman Middle School
- Sequoia Middle School
- Southridge Tech Middle School
- Wayne Ruble Middle School

=== Elementary School ===
- Almond Elementary School
- Beech Avenue Elementary School
- Canyon Crest Elementary School
- Chaparral Academy of Technology
- Citrus Elementary School
- Cypress Elementary School
- Date Elementary School
- Dolores Huerta International Academy
- Dorothy Grant Innovations Academy
- Hemlock Elementary School
- Juniper Elementary School
- Kathy Binks Elementary School
- Live Oak Elementary School
- Locust Elementary School
- Mango Elementary School
- Maple Elementary School
- North Tamarind Elementary School
- Oak Park Elementary School
- O'Day Short Elementary School
- Oleander Elementary School
- Palmetto Elementary School
- Poplar Elementary School
- Redwood Elementary School
- Shadow Hills Elementary School
- Sierra Lakes Elementary School
- South Tamarind Elementary School
- Ted J. Porter Elementary School
- Tokay Elementary School
- Virginia Primrose Elementary School
- West Randall Elementary School

== Board of education ==
Board of Education provides direction for operating the District through actions taken at its meetings. Board members, as a body, develop the policies by which the educational programs and other business of the District are carried out. They may not act individually in the name of the Board; action may be taken only when the Board is gathered in a formal meeting with a majority of the members present

Members:

Marcelino "Mars" Serna - Board President

Adam Perez - Board Vice President

Mary Sandoval - Board Member

Jennifer Quezada - Board Member

Joe Armendarez - Board Member

=== Elementary schools ===
- Almond Elementary School - https://www.fusd.net/almond
- Beech Avenue Elementary School
- Kathy Binks Elementary School
- Canyon Crest Elementary School
- Chaparral Elementary School
- Citrus Elementary School
- Cypress Elementary School
- Date Elementary School
- Dolores Huerta International Academy
- Dorothy Grant Elementary School
- Hemlock Elementary School
- Juniper Elementary School
- Live Oak Elementary School
- Locust Elementary School
- Mango Elementary School
- Maple Elementary School
- North Tamarind Elementary School
- Oak Park Elementary School
- Oleander Elementary School
- Palmetto Elementary School
- Poplar Elementary School
- Ted Porter Elementary School
- Primrose Elementary School
- Randall Pepper Elementary School
- Redwood Elementary School
- Shadow Hills Elementary School
- Sierra Lakes Elementary School
- South Tamarind Elementary School
- Tokay Elementary School
- Virginia Primrose Elementary School
- West Randall Elementary School

=== Middle schools ===
- Alder Middle School
- Almeria Middle School
- Fontana Middle School
- Wayne Ruble Middle School
- Sequoia Middle School
- Southridge Middle School
- Harry S Truman Middle School

=== High schools ===
- Fontana A. B. Miller High School
- Citrus High School.
- Eric Birch High School.
- Fontana High School
- Henry J. Kaiser High School
- Jurupa Hills High School.
- Summit High School

=== Charter schools ===
- ASA Fontana

=== Adult Schools ===
- Fontana Adult School
